= Handel (Antwerp premetro station) =

Premetro station in Antwerp, Belgium

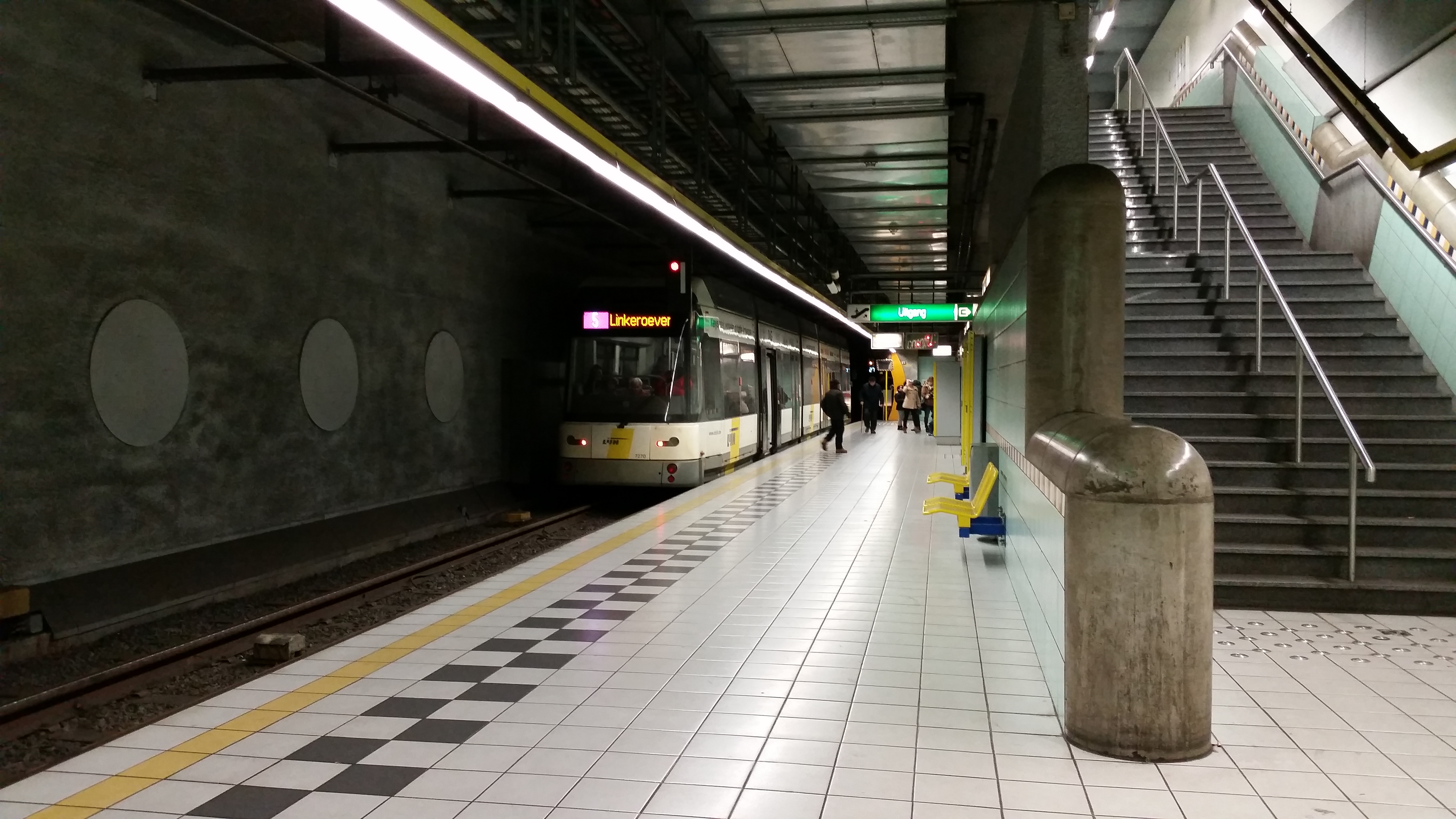

General information
- Coordinates: 51°13′27″N 4°25′55″E
- Owner: De Lijn
- Tracks: 2

Construction
- Structure type: Underground
- Platform levels: 2

History
- Opened: 1 April 1996

Services
| Preceding station | Antwerp tram | Following station |
|---|---|---|
| Schijnpoort towards P+R Merksem | Tram route 2 | Elisabeth towards Hoboken |
| Elisabeth towards P+R Melsele | Tram route 3 | Schijnpoort towards P+R Merksem |
| Elisabeth towards P+R Linkeroever | Tram route 5 | Schijnpoort towards Wijnegem |
| Schijnpoort towards P+R Luchtbal | Tram route 6 | Elisabeth towards P+R Olympiade |
Location
- Location within the Antwerp premetro network

Handel premetro station is an Antwerp premetro station. Located under the intersection of the Handelsstraat with the Lange Stuivenbergstraat, it is served by lines 2, 3, 5 and 6.

Handel premetro station is the smallest premetro station in Antwerp. It is completely decorated with the colors of transport company De Lijn. The -1 level has a small ticket hall with access to the platforms; there is only one exit. The -2 level has a 60-meter platform for trains going toward Elisabeth station, the -3 level has the platform for trains going toward premetro Schijnpoort station.

In 1996, only line 3 served this premetro station. In 2006 line 5 was added, in 2007, line 6 was added and in 2012, line 2 was connected.

== See also ==
- Trams in Antwerp
