= Elisabeth (Antwerp premetro station) =

Premetro station in Antwerp, Belgium

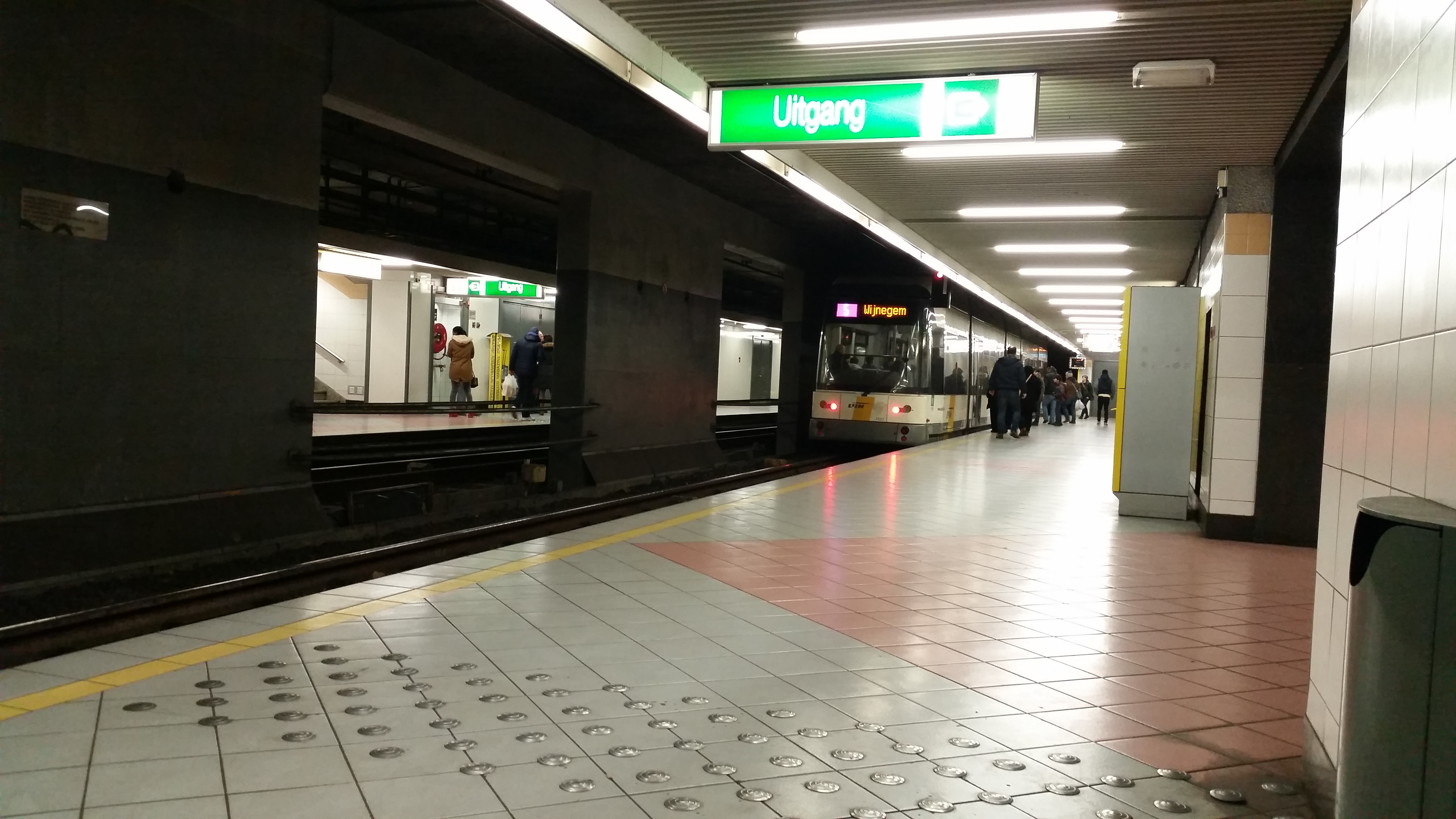

General information
- Coordinates: 51°13′22″N 4°25′27″E
- Owner: De Lijn
- Tracks: 2

Construction
- Structure type: Underground
- Platform levels: 1

History
- Opened: 1 April 1996

Services
Preceding station	Antwerp tram	Following station
Handel towards P+R Merksem	Tram route 2	Astrid towards Hoboken
Astrid towards P+R Melsele	Tram route 3	Handel towards P+R Merksem
Astrid towards P+R Linkeroever	Tram route 5	Handel towards Wijnegem
Handel towards P+R Luchtbal	Tram route 6	Astrid towards P+R Olympiade
Location
- Location within the Antwerp premetro network

Elisabeth premetro station is a premetro station in Antwerp, Belgium. Located under the intersection of the Sint-Elisabethstraat with the Greinstraat and the Delinstraat, it is served by lines 2, 3, 5 and 6.

Elisabeth premetro station has only one entrance that leads to level -1. The ticket hall is on level -1, while on level -2 are both platforms, each 60 meters, in front of each other.

In 1996 only line 3 served this premetro station. Line 5 was added in 2006; line 6, in 2007; and line 2, in 2012.

== See also ==
- Trams in Antwerp
