= Sport (Antwerp premetro station) =

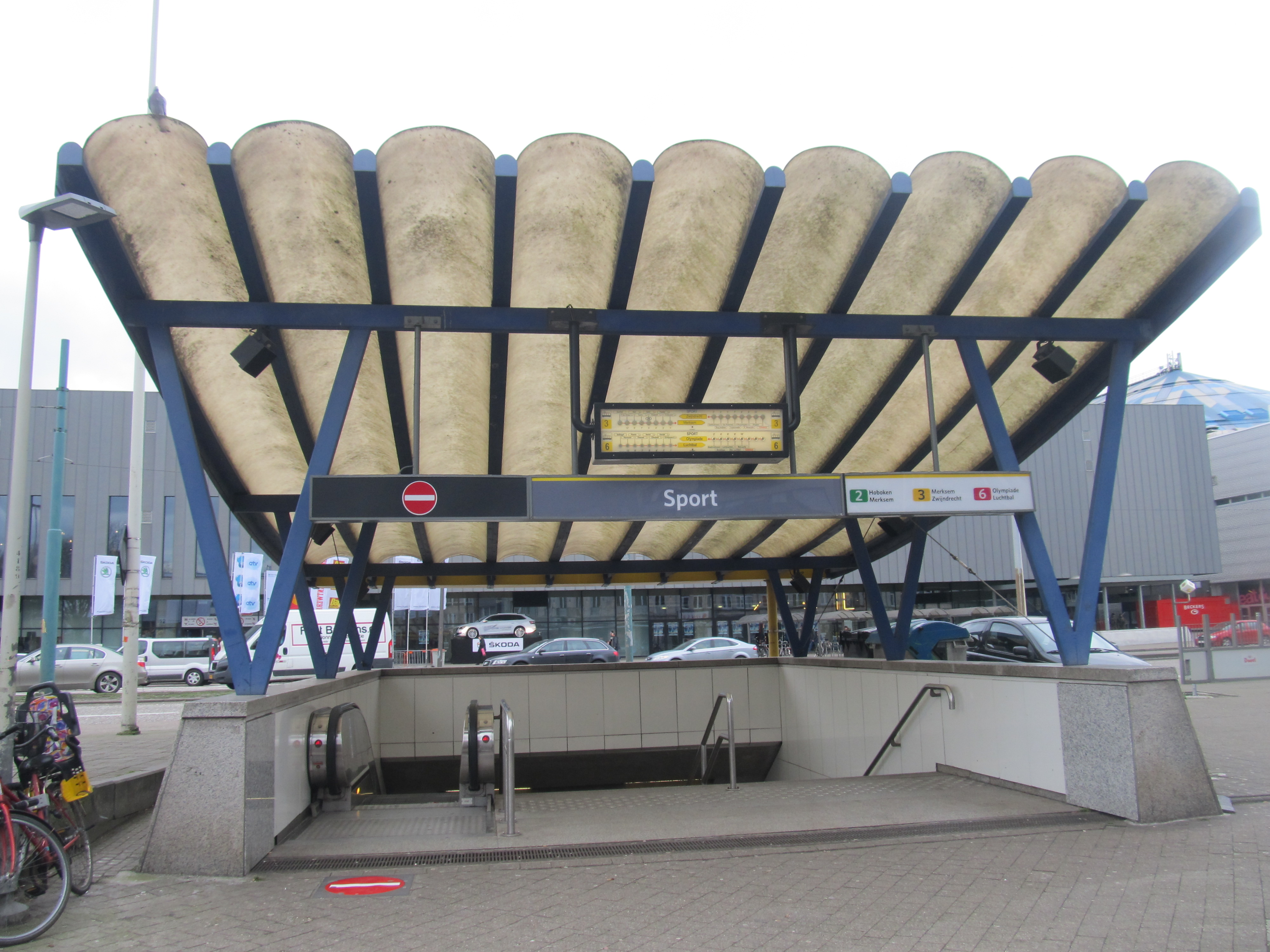

General information
- Location: Belgium
- Coordinates: 51°13′49″N 04°26′34″E
- Operator: De Lijn

Construction
- Structure type: underground
- Platform levels: 3

History
- Opened: 1 April 1996

Services
| Preceding station | Antwerp tram | Following station |
|---|---|---|
| Gasthuishoeve towards P+R Merksem | Tram route 2 | Schijnpoort towards Hoboken |
| Schijnpoort towards P+R Melsele | Tram route 3 | Gasthuishoeve towards P+R Merksem |
| Gasthuishoeve towards P+R Luchtbal | Tram route 6 | Schijnpoort towards P+R Olympiade |
Location
- Location within the Antwerp premetro network

Sport is an underground station in the Antwerp premetro network. The station was opened on April 1, 1996 as the last station on the northern premetro axis. At present, the station is served by tram routes 2, 3 and 6. Tram route 5 also passes through the northern premetro axis, but leaves the premetro tunnel via the Ten Eekhovelei exit between Schijnpoort and Sport. It does not stop at the Sport station, but has a stop called "Sportpaleis" at the Ten Eekhovelei.

== Location ==
Sport station is located in the Antwerp district of Deurne, and lies directly under the M. Gregoireplein. In its direct proximity lies the Sportpaleis and the smaller Lotto Arena event halls. Above the station also lies the terminus of tram route 12.

== Layout ==
In general, Sport station can be considered modern and luxurious, as extra money was spent on the construction of the station. The station lies in a curve in the premetro tunnel, and also contains an underground turning loop. The decoration in the station was designed by Renaat Braem and Jan Willems and consists of a mosaic pattern of mostly white tiles with bright yellow and orange accents. Wooden figures of ice skaters and racing cyclists can also be seen on the walls of the platforms, referring to the function of the Sportpaleis as an important venue for sports competitions. Since 2005, the station has been fitted with clear signboards, indicators for blind passengers, and an elevator.

At the -1 level lies an entrance hall. There are two platforms on the -2 level. One of them is completely finished and is served by trams going toward Schijnpoort and the city centre. The other platform is directly connected to the turning loop next to the station. It is not serviced by any regular line, and has a staircase going directly to the Sportpaleis. On the -3 level lies a third platform, which is used by trams in the opposite direction toward Merksem or Luchtbal.
