= Schijnpoort (Antwerp premetro station) =

Premetro station in Antwerp, Belgium

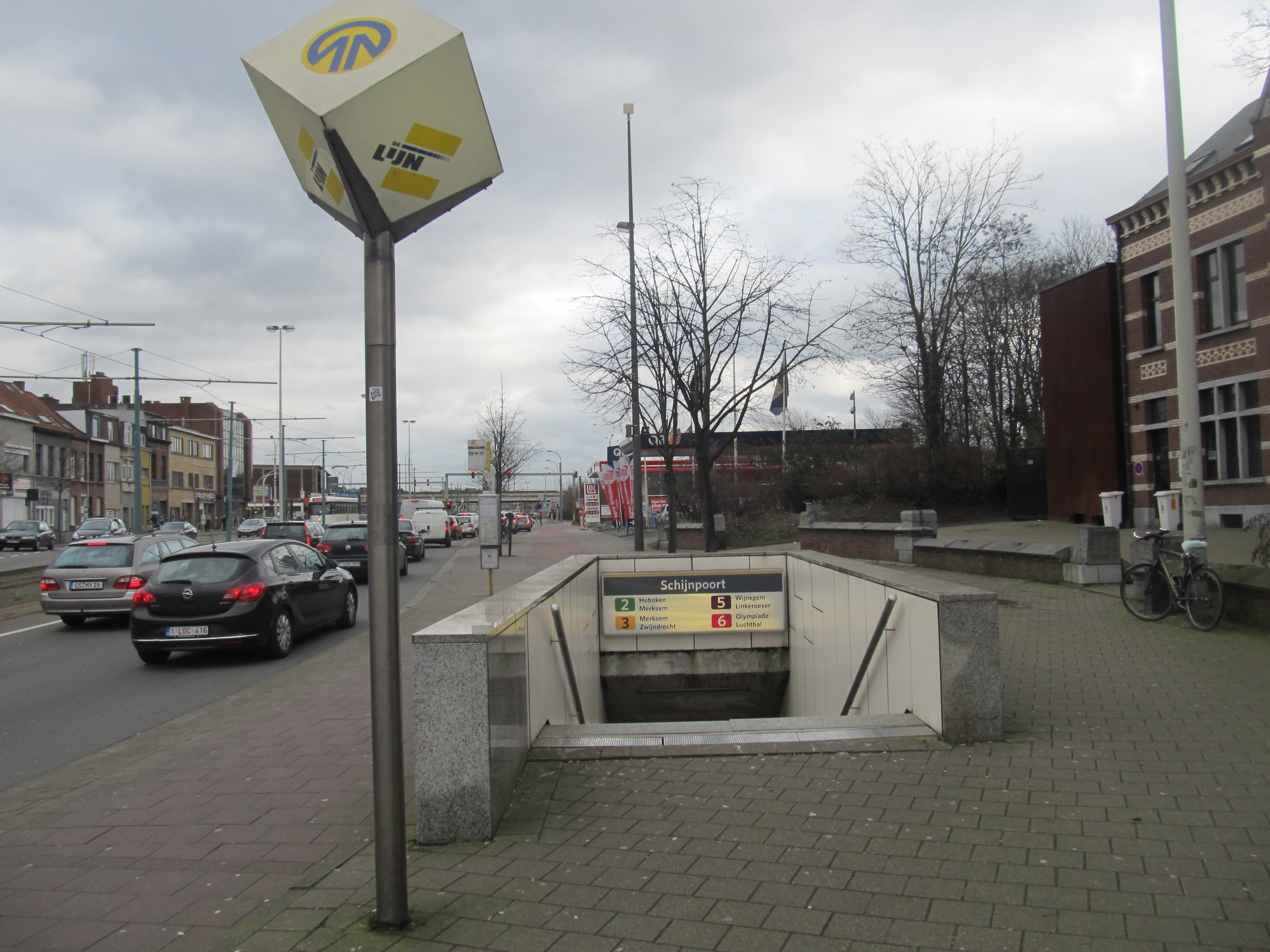

General information
- Location: Belgium
- Coordinates: 51°13′38″N 04°26′20″E
- Operator: De Lijn

Construction
- Structure type: underground
- Platform levels: 2

History
- Opened: 1 April 1996

Services
Preceding station	Antwerp tram	Following station
Sport towards P+R Merksem	Tram route 2	Handel towards Hoboken
Handel towards P+R Melsele	Tram route 3	Sport towards P+R Merksem
Handel towards P+R Linkeroever	Tram route 5	Sportpaleis towards Wijnegem
Sport towards P+R Luchtbal	Tram route 6	Handel towards P+R Olympiade
Location
- Location within the Antwerp premetro network

Schijnpoort is an underground station in the Antwerp premetro network. The station was named after the Schijnpoort gate, part of the Brialmont fortifications, which was demolished in 1970 when constructing the R1 ring road. It was opened in 1996 as part of the northern premetro axis and was originally only served by tram route 3. Currently, it is also serviced by tram route 5 (since 2006), tram route 6 (since 2007) and tram route 2 (since 2012).

== Lay-out ==
The design of the station is characterized by the presence of large colored arrows used as signpost and the circular windows separating the escalators from the platforms.

The -1 level of the station contains an entrance hall which contains ticket offices and has exits on both sides of the Schijnpoortweg. On the -2 level lies the platform toward Handel station, used by trams going toward the city centre. The -3 level contains the northbound platform toward Sport station, serviced by trams going toward Merksem, Luchtbal and Deurne.

Just south of the station also lies the unused premetro tunnel under the Pothoekstraat and Kerkstraat, which now links the northern and eastern premetro tunnels. The tunnel was built in the 1970s and was to be used by tram route 3, but has, as of 2016, not yet been finished due to budgetary issues that arose during construction. It contains the also unfinished premetro stations Stuivenberg and Sint-Willibrordus.

== Location ==
Schijnpoort station is situated directly underneath the Schijnpoortweg, between the R10 "Singel" ring road, and railway line 12. In its vicinity lie the cargo station Antwerpen-Schijnpoort, the Spoor Noord park and the Schijnpoort sewage treatment facility. Since 2015, the Sinksenfoor, Antwerp's largest funfair, is annually held on the Spoor Oost terrain near the station. The fair takes six weeks in the months May and July, and had to move to the terrain from its previous standing place at the Zuiderdokken after complaints from local inhabitants led to a preliminary injunction forcing the organizers to find a different location.
