= Astrid (Antwerp premetro station) =

Light rail station in Antwerp, Belgium

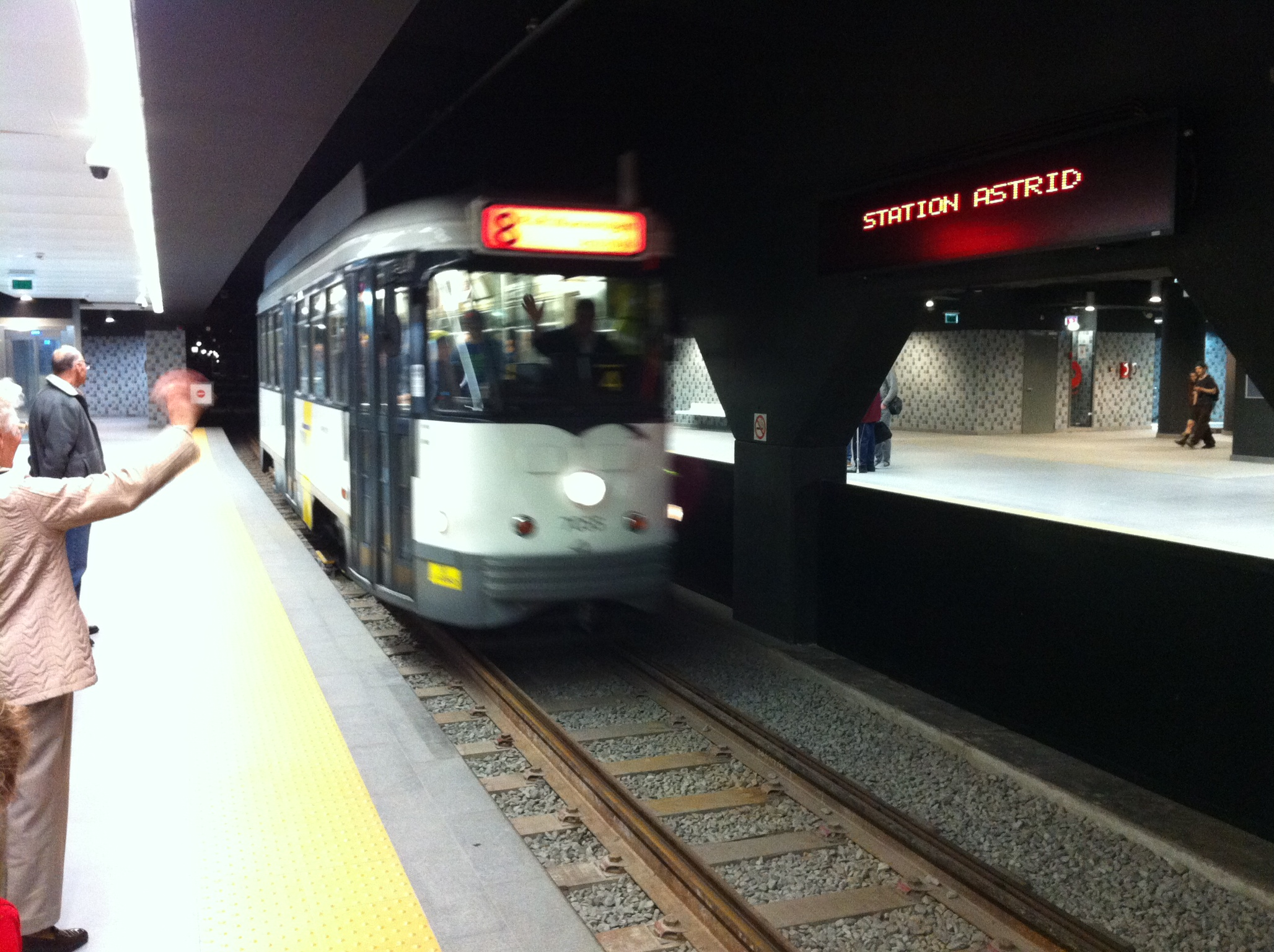

General information
- Location: Belgium
- Coordinates: 51°13′08″N 04°25′17″E
- Operator: De Lijn

Construction
- Structure type: underground
- Platform levels: 3

History
- Opened: 1 April 1996

Services
Preceding station	Antwerp tram	Following station
Elisabeth towards P+R Merksem	Tram route 2	Diamant towards Hoboken
Opera towards P+R Melsele	Tram route 3	Elisabeth towards P+R Merksem
Opera towards P+R Linkeroever	Tram route 5	Elisabeth towards Wijnegem
Elisabeth towards P+R Luchtbal	Tram route 6	Diamant towards P+R Olympiade
Terminus	Tram route 8	Zegel towards P+R Wommelgem
Opera towards P+R Schoonselhof	Tram route 10	Zegel towards Wijnegem
Location
- Location within the Antwerp premetro network

Astrid is a station in the Antwerp premetro network that was opened on April 1, 1996. The station lies directly under the Koningin Astridplein on the Gemeentestraat side. The station is one of the two premetro stations in Antwerp servicing passengers from Antwerp Central Station, the other being Diamant, which lies to the south of Astrid. It is served by tram lines 8 and 10. Line 8 terminate in this station.

== Location ==
Astrid station lies under the northern part of the Astridplein square. Adjacent to the square lie the Radisson Blu hotel and the entrance gate to the Antwerp Chinatown on the northern side, the Koningin Elisabethzaal and Antwerp Zoo on the eastern side and Antwerp Central Station on the southern side. The Rooseveltplaats bus station, serving a large portion of all bus traffic in the city, lies some 200 meters to the west of Astrid station.

== Layout ==
The -1 level of the station contains the entrance hall and two platforms lying in an east–west orientation. The platforms were opened on April 18, 2015, along with the opening of the Reuzenpijp tunnel and the introduction of tram route 8. Since 18 April 2017, route 10 also stops here. Trams coming from Wommelgem (8) and Wijnegem (10) arrive at the northern platform, where passengers can get out. The trams then continue westward toward the Rooseveltplaats underground turning loop, and drive back to Astrid station, allowing departing passengers to enter the tram on the southern platform.

The -2 level contains two more halls, giving access to the -3 and -4 levels and allowing passengers to cross the tracks of the -1 level. The levels -3 and -4 contain two north–south-oriented platforms serviced by routes 2, 3, 5 and 6. The platform on the -3 level is serviced by trams going south to Diamant, or west to Opera, using the central railway triangle under Antwerp Central Station. The -4 level is used by trams going north toward Deurne, Wijnegem, Merksem and Luchtbal.

Since December 2006, station is also connected to the newly built underground car park under the Astridplein. Using a walkway running through the car park, passengers can also reach the Antwerp central station and Diamant premetro station without having to come above ground.

== Extension ==
From its opening in 1996 until the opening of route 8 and the Reuzenpijp tunnel on April 18, 2015, only the platforms on the -3 and -4 levels were in use. The two platforms on the -1 level, built between 1977 and 1981, were hidden behind wooden panels and inaccessible for passengers. In March 2013, works started to refurbish the station in a more modern style, and to open the east–west platforms as a part of the LIVAN-project, which included the opening of the eastern premetro axis. Since April 18, 2015, when the premetro tunnel was officially put into service, the platforms at the -1 level are serviced by route 8.

In June 2017, the opening of the metro entrance at the Leien and the opening of the -3 level of Opera station will allow trams using the eastern premetro tunnel to continue beyond Astrid station towards the Bolivarplaats (route 8) and even Hoboken (route 10).

It is planned that tram route 10, which now uses a detour to join route 8 in the premetro tunnel from the Muggenberg stop, will use its previous route through the centre of Deurne after the opening of the Foorplein branch of the Reuzenpijp in September 2017.
