= Tram route 10 (Antwerp) =

Tram Route 10

Overview
- Locale: Antwerp
- Termini: Wijnegem Fortveld; Hoboken P+R Schoonselhof
- Stations: 32
- Color on map: black text on lime background

Service
- Type: Tram
- System: Antwerp tram network
- Operator(s): De Lijn
- Rolling stock: PCC, HermeLijn, Albatross (Tram)

History
- Opened: 1873

Technical
- Line length: 14.5 km (9 mi)

Tram Route 10 (briefly Tram Route 11) is a tram route in Antwerp and nearby Wijnegem. Tram route 10 entered operation in 1873, making it one of the oldest tram routes still active in Antwerp, next to Tram Route 4 (Antwerp) and Tram Route 7 (Antwerp).

The current/present day route was opened on June 2, 2017 connecting the Astrid Pre-metro station, Antwerp South and P+R Schoonselhof in Hoboken with Wijnegem.

== Trajectory ==
Tram route 10 (since September 16, 2017) begins at Wijnegem Fortveld terminus. From there it runs to Wijnegem Shopping Center, intersecting the R11 (Antwerp's Second Outer Ring), before making its way to Ruggeveld in Deurne. The route then rides through Deurne North town center via the Turnhoutsebaan, then proceeds to enter the premetro tunnel of Antwerp, near the R10 (Antwerp's Inner Ring). The tram, once underground stops at Borgerhout Zegel station, and then continues a non-stop trajectory under the Turnhoutsebaan and Carnotstraat towards Astrid station, nearest to Antwerp Central Station (Station Antwerpen-Centraal). Past Astrid, the tram continues to Opera Station, nearest Antwerp Central Station, then takes an overground route (similar to Tram route 8) towards Antwerp South (Antwerpen Zuid).

From Antwerp South, it then makes its way through Antwerp South over the Orbital Ring of Antwerp, towards its final terminus, Hoboken P+R Schoonselhof. From there it takes an overground turning loop making its way back to Astrid, and back to Wijnegem Fortveld.

== History ==
=== Pre and Post World War I Route (1873–1933) ===
Tram route 11 was one of the original three Antwerp horse tram lines that were constructed in 1873. This was then replaced with the electric tram service on October 31, 1903, connecting the Melkmarkt in the city center and Borgerhout, briefly as tram route 11, before being given the permanent allocation of Tram Line 10. On June 12, 1906, the tram route was extended from the Turnhoutsepoort to the Turnhoutsebaan in Deurne, a total extension of 5 km (3.1 mi). During World War I, the tram route 10 was restricted to the Turnhoutsepoort to the Melkmarkt in Antwerp City Center. These restrictions were lifted and trams would serve Deurne again from August 1, 1915.

=== Pre and Post World War II Route (1933–2012) ===
In 1933, tram route 10 ran between the Melkmarkt in the city center and the Schotensesteenweg in Deurne. During World War II, there were interruptions to this route. In 1979, they had plans to extend tram 10 to Wijnegem to take over the range of the two former NMVB (Dutch: Nationale Maatschappij van Buurtspoorwegen) Tram Lines. This move was completed on April 24, 2012, and therefore the tram line was expanded to serve Wijnegem Fortveld.

=== Previous Modern Day Route (2012–2017) ===
On April 24, 2012, entered the new Tram 10 route from Wijnegem to Melkmarkt in the city center. This route would run Tram 10 from Wijnegem to Deurne Village (Dorp) then overground to Antwerp Central Station and from there to Melkmarkt.

In February 2017, due to work on the bridge over Antwerp's Orbital Ring road (on the Turnhoutsebaan), Tram 10 was diverted and would no longer serve Deurne Village, instead it would serve Deurne South and the Herentalsebaan and therefore make use of the Premetro Network. This diversion (omleidingen) would be maintained until Mid September 2017, after the new route had come into effect.

In June 2017, DeLijn announced that Tram route 10 would be extended. This new route would make use of the new tunnel connecting Wijnegem to Antwerp via the Turnhoutsepoort.

=== Current Route (2017 onwards) ===
As part of the completion of the new tunnel on the Turnhoutsepoort, DeLijn extended the trajectories of both Tram route 8 in Wommelgem and Tram route 10. Tram route 10 would be extended to now connect Wijnegem to P+R Schoonselhof in Hoboken, but for the first few months following this route change, Tram 10 would still follow the diversion via Deurne South.

Since September 16, 2017, Tram route 10 has driven without diversion between Wijnegem and Hoboken P+R Schoonselhof via the new tunnel.

== Future ==
Tram route 10 runs along the unopened pre-metro stations of Floorplein, Drink and Carnot. According to the Master Plan project in Antwerp (2020), the plan is to open all of those premetro stations in the long run. Currently, Opera Station is expected to be re-serviced by all trams starting December 8, 2019.

In the same Master Plan, tram route 10 has plans to be extended towards Schilde. The new bridge over the Albert Canal in Wijnegem would be used for this, however, it is not currently suitable for trams. Therefore, an extension to the aforementioned bridge would need to be completed first.

It was also included that Tram route 24 would be serviced as far out as Hemiksem and later to Schelle. It is now however likely that Tram route 10 would probably be extended to service these places instead.

== Rolling stock ==
Service on the previous tram route 10, was provided by 10 PCC cars between March 1966 and 2012. In April 1975, two axle pre-war trams were also used.

Since its extension to Wijnegem in 2012, Tram route 10 was covered mostly by a mix of PCC cars and HermeLijn (HermeLijn) trams. Since the end of February 2016, most Tram route 10 is served by the new Albatross tram, with PCC cars getting occasional use.

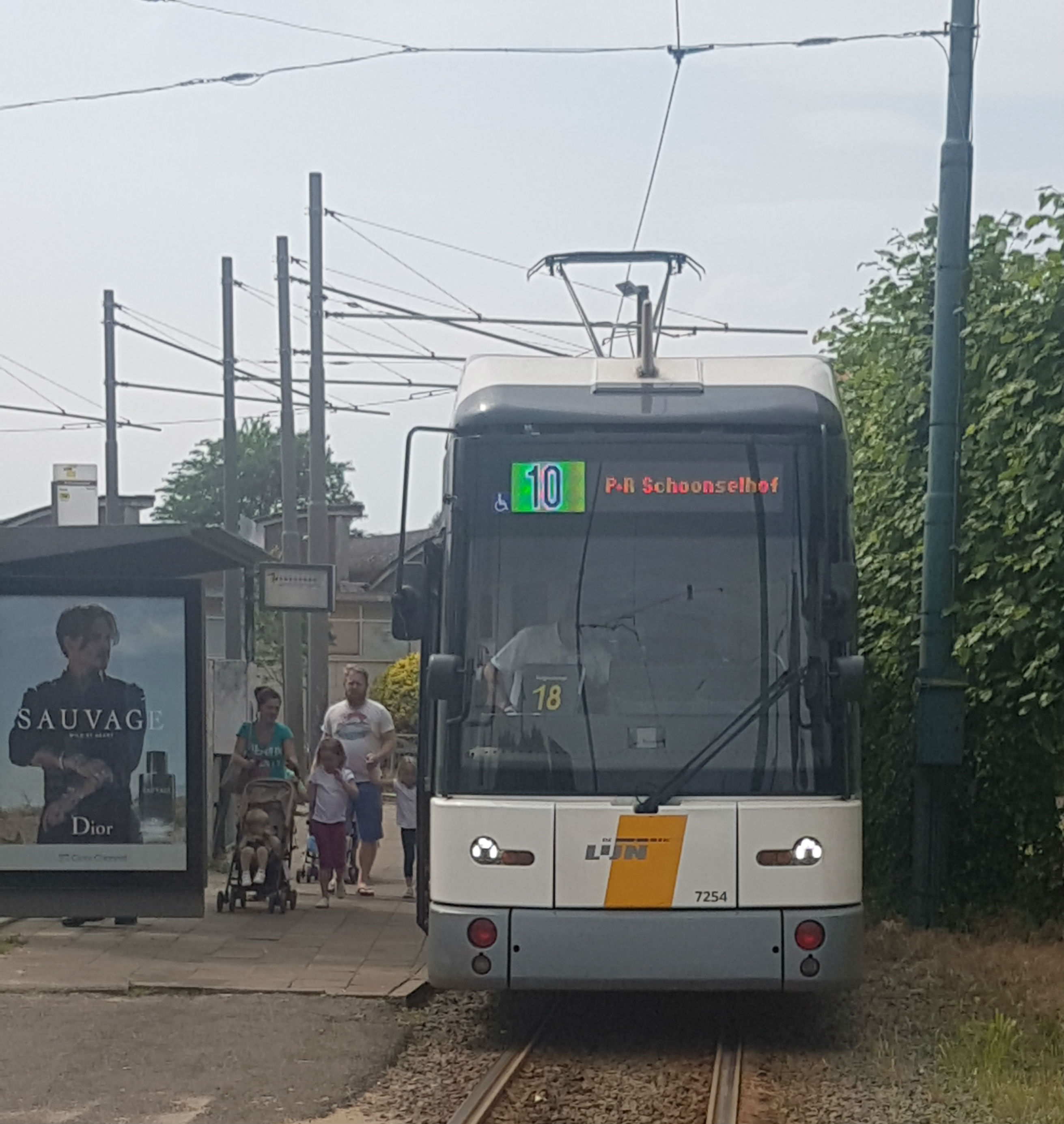
Tram 10 on its first day of Extension to P+R Schoonselhof

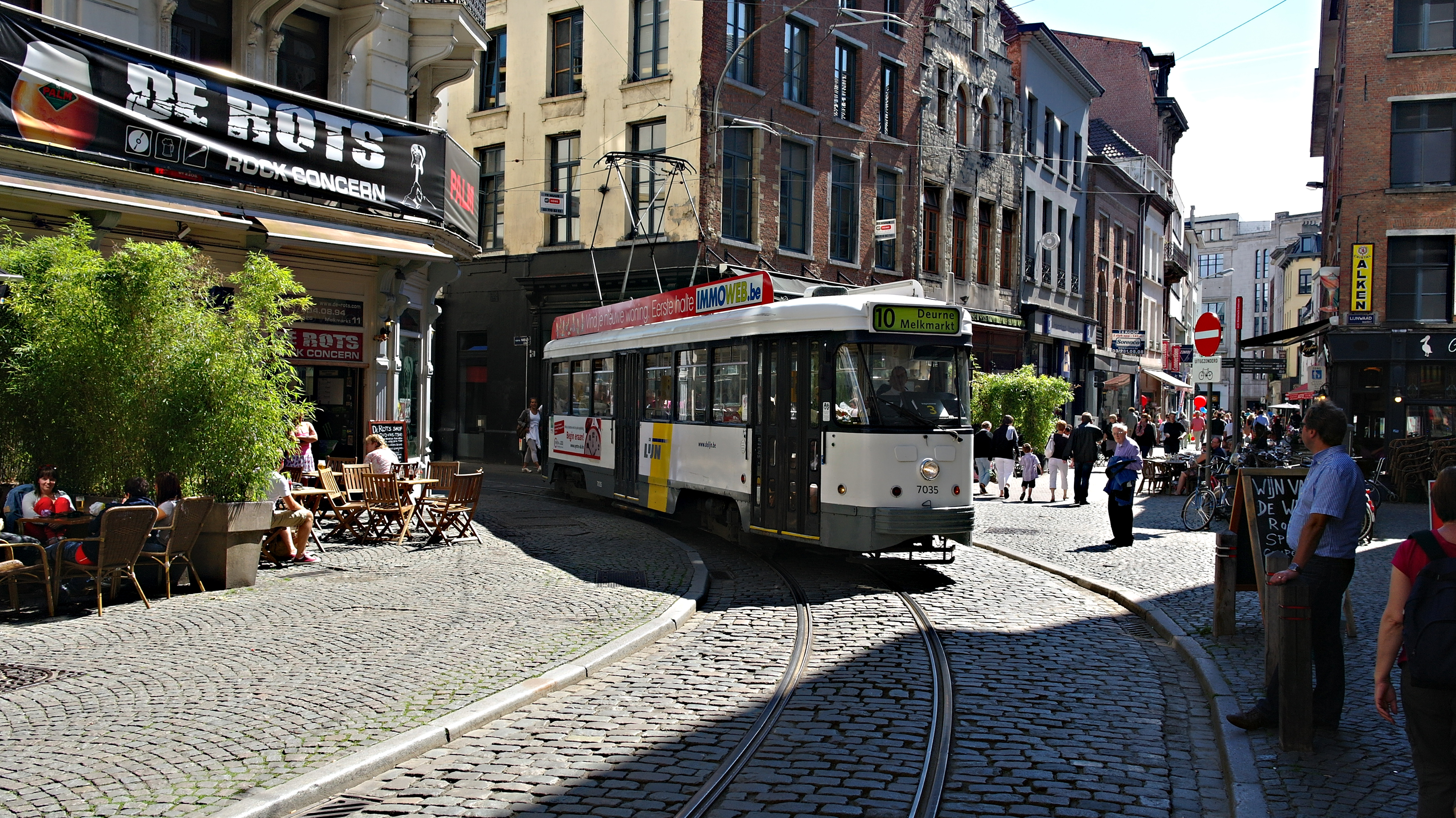
PCC tram in Antwerp (Old Tram 10)

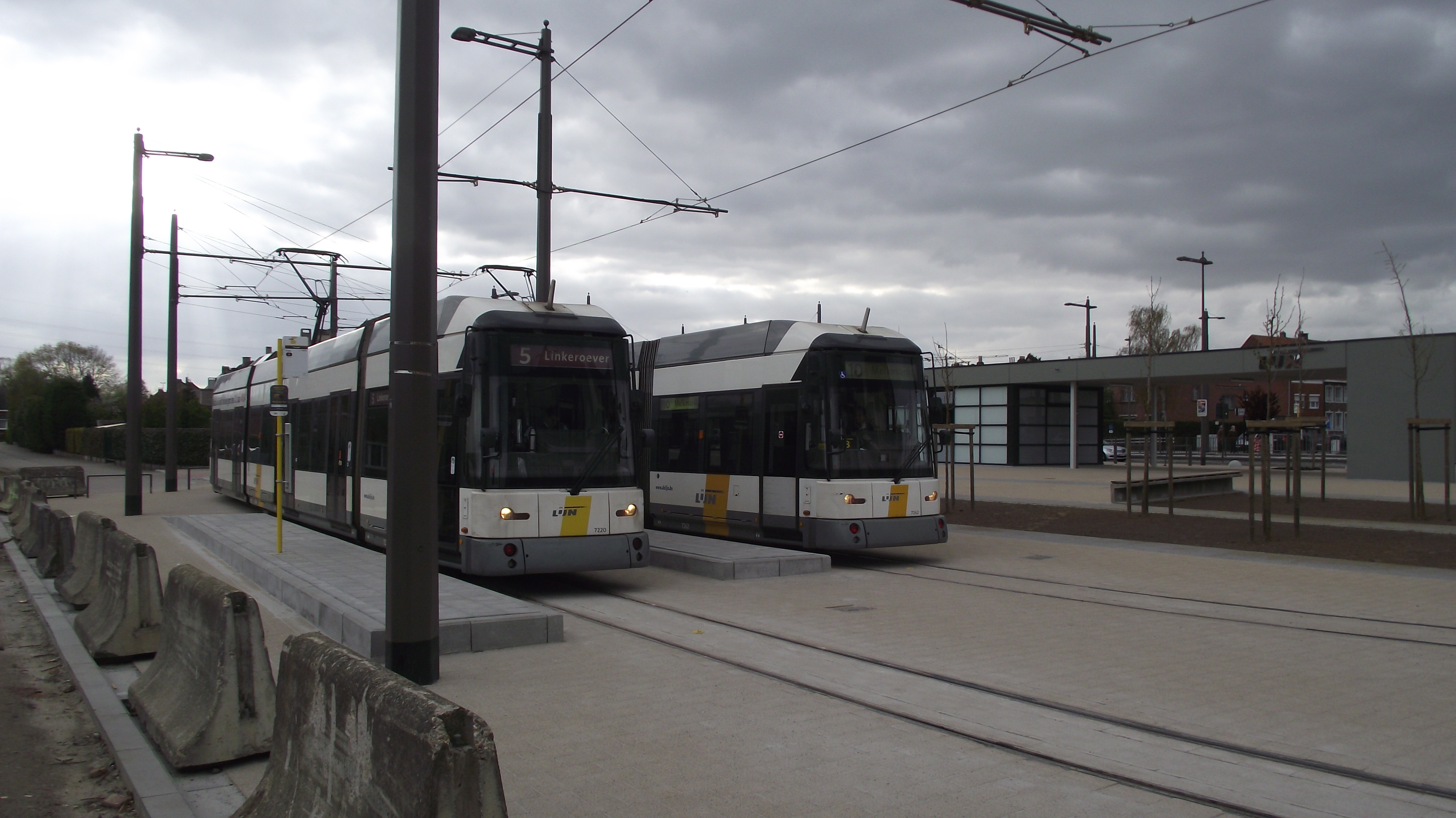
Terminus: Wijnegem Fortveld

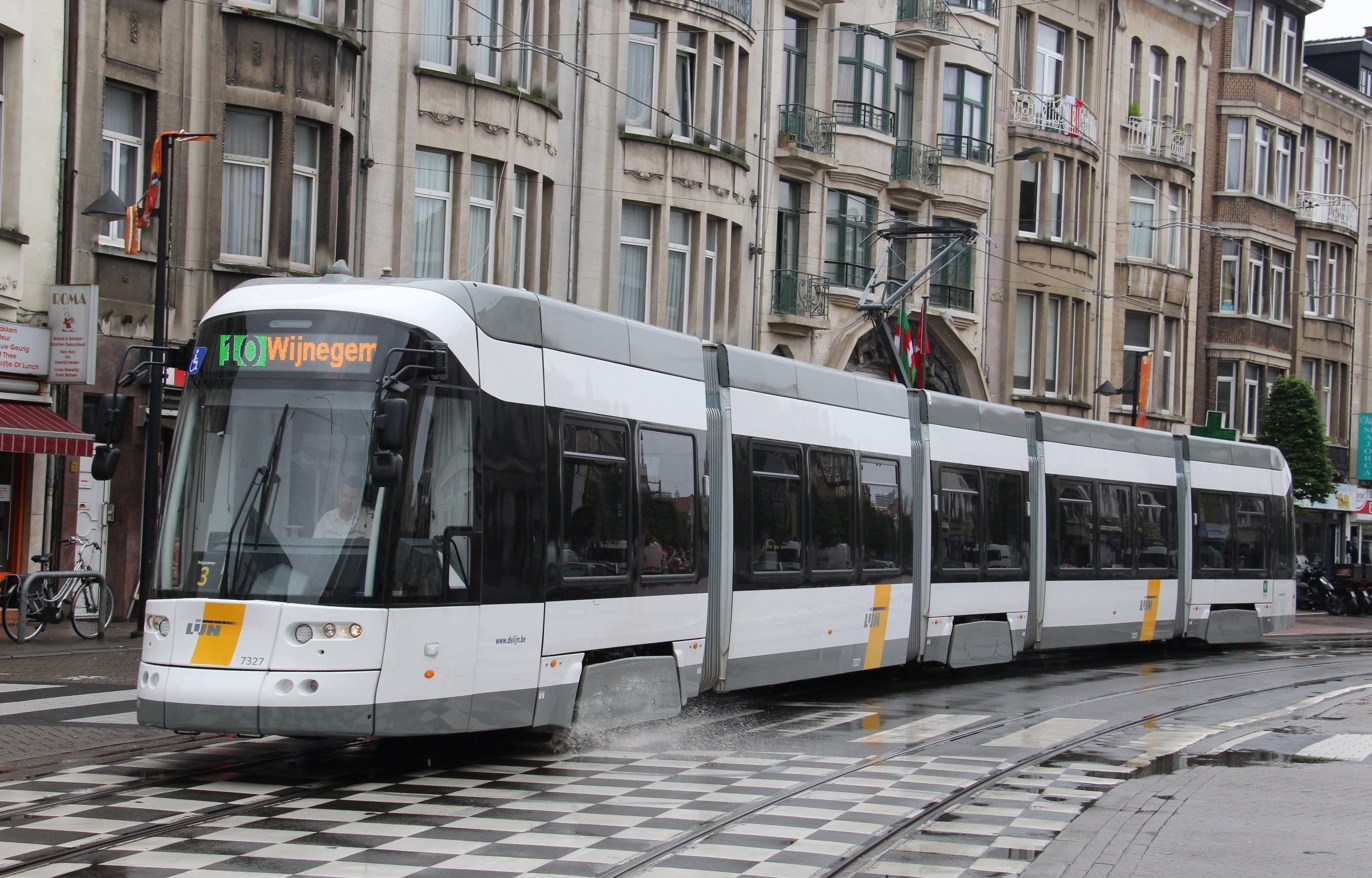
Albatross Tram 10 - In Service since 2016

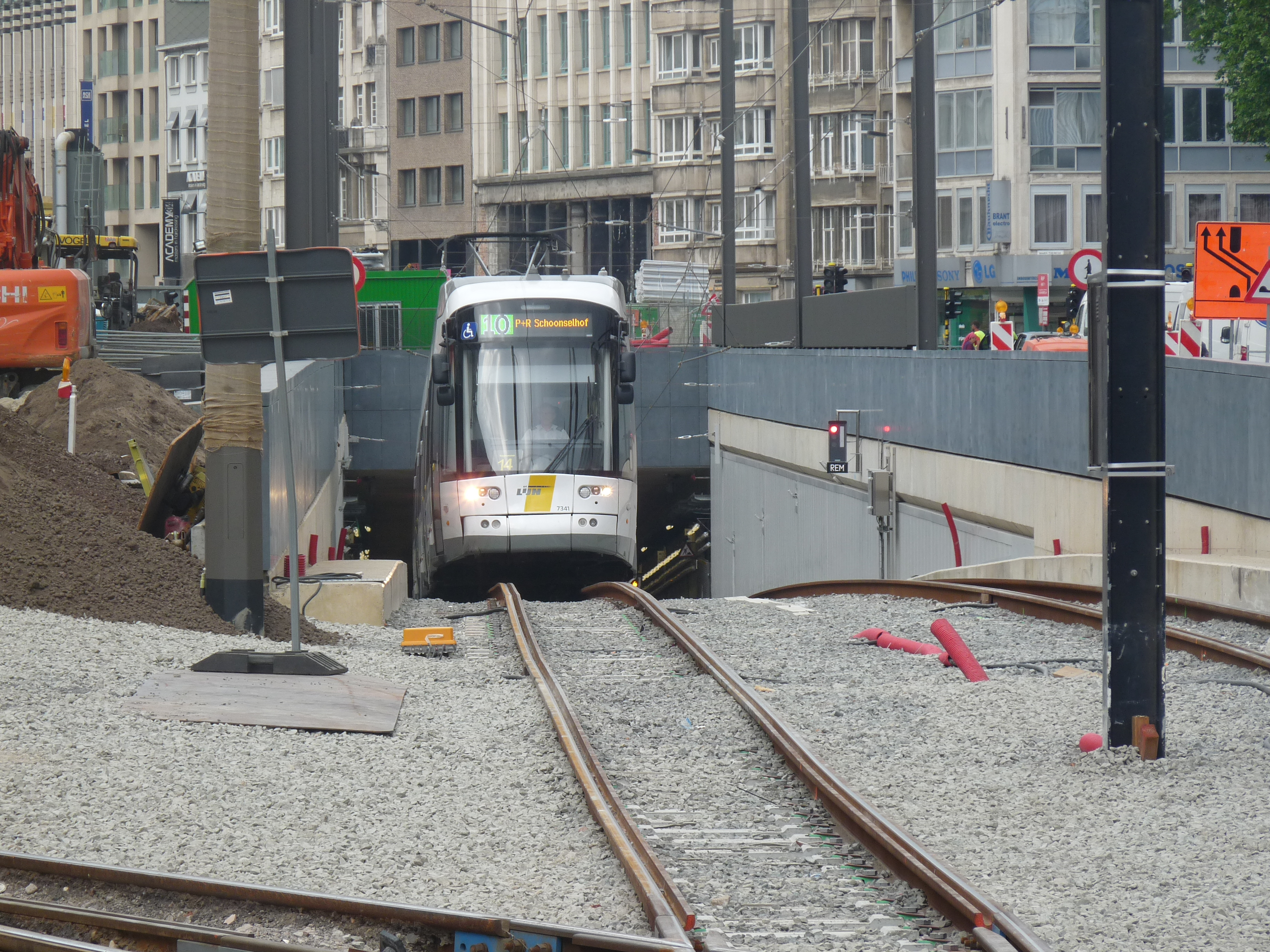
Albatross Tram on the ramp next to Antwerp Stadspark

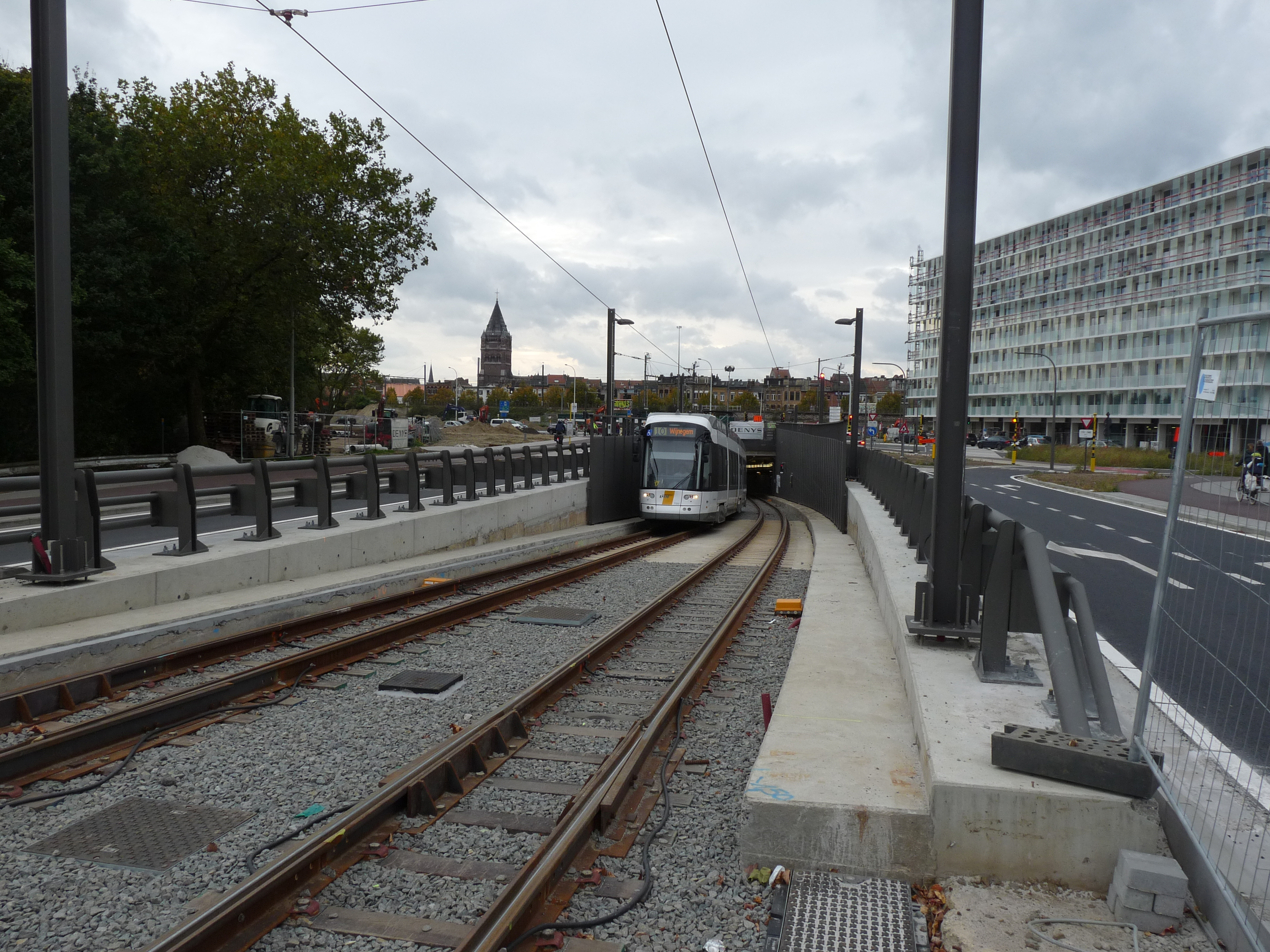
Albatross Tram coming from the Reuzenpijp next to the R10, Antwerp

== See also ==
- List of town tramway systems in Belgium
