= Tram route 3 (Antwerp) =

- Itinerary of tram route 3

Overview
- Locale: Antwerp
- Termini: Melsele P+R; Merksem Fortsesteenweg P+R
- Stations: 27
- Color on map: black text on yellow background

Service
- Type: tram
- System: Antwerp tram network
- Operator(s): De Lijn
- Rolling stock: HermeLijn

History
- Opened: October 9, 1902

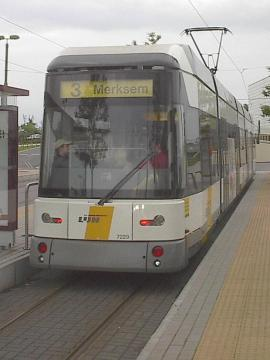
Low floor HermeLijn tram at the terminus of tramline 3 in Antwerp.

The Antwerp premetro tram route 3 is a tram route connecting Merksem with Melsele in the city of Antwerp. The route is operated by the Flemish transport company De Lijn and historically also by its Antwerp predecessor, MIVA (Maatschappij Intercommunaal Vervoer Antwerpen).

== History ==
Tram 3 is one of the oldest tram lines in Antwerp. The original electric tram route 3 was opened on October 9, 1902 on the Groenplaats - Antwerp South station (Zuidstatie) trajectory. A year later, the route was already extended from the Groenplaats to Antwerp Central Station (Middenstatie). In 1904, the route was once again extended, this time from Antwerp Central Station to the (now demolished) Schijnpoort gate in the Seefhoek neighborhood, via the Carnotstraat, Kerkstraat and Pothoekstraat. In 1906, works start on a third extension, from Schijnpoort to Oude Bareel in Merksem via the Bredabaan, and were finished later that year. Trams servicing the whole route until Oude Bareel used a mixed white/yellow rollsign, while those stopping at Schijnpoort used plain yellow signs.

In 1936, the trajectory of route 4 (Hoboken -Groenplaats) is coupled to route 3 at the request of the Antwerp city council, as a means to decongest the Groenplaats. After the Second World War, however, route 4 is restored in its original state, and route 3 once again runs between Antwerp South Station and Oude Bareel, with route 3 bis having its terminal at the Suikerrui near the Grote Markt.

On March 20, 1962, the first PCC cars are introduced on the route. In 1965, due to the construction of the Antwerp Ring road and the demolition of old Antwerp South Station, the route shortened to the nearby Lambermontplaats. In 1968, the old turning loop at the Raoul Grégroireplein is replaced by a new one at the Van Der Delftstraat at the Schijnpoort/Sportpaleis terminus. On October 5, 1970, route 3 is the last tram route in Antwerp to switch to a one-man steering system. At the same time, the tram cars were fitted with an automatic ticketing system. However, some conductors could still be seen on the trams in the following years, as some of the former conductors were unfit for the supplementary training to be employed elsewhere.

In 1972, works begins on the Antwerp premetro with the construction of a central axis between the Groenplaats and Antwerp Central Station. Due to these works, route 3 is shortened to the Grote Markt, where a temporary turning loop has been built. Also, a temporary shuttle tram route between the Groenplaats and Lambermontplaats is put into service during the works. As of 1973, route 3 no longer used its old trajectory over the Schoenmarkt, Meir and Keyserlei between the Groenplaats and Antwerp Central Station, as these streets were inaccessible due to the premetro works. Instead, the route used a more northern trajectory via the Gemeentestraat, Rooseveldtplaats, Lange Nieuwstraat and Kipdorp toward a new terminus at the Melkmarkt. In 1978, after the finishing of the premetro works, the shuttle route between the Lambermontplaats and Groenplaats is added to route 8, and route 3 is shortened to the Groenplaats.

Also, in 1975, works start on the Bredabaan on the construction of a separate tram lane between Oude Bareel and the Frans de l'Arbrelaan. Initially, it was planned that the buses of the NMVB, which operated the regional network, would also use this separate lane, which led to an increased with as the tram lane to offer the buses the necessary space. However, in 1978, the NMVB decided not to use the central tram lane, and to continue to use the old stops on the exterior lane. The bus routes on the Bredabaan would only much later use the tram stops on the central lane.

In 1994, work officially starts to finish the northern premetro axis running between Antwerp Central Station and the Sportpaleis. During the last weekend of March in 1996, traffic on the route is suspended to allow for the construction of the premetro entrance at the Gabriel Theunisbrug over the Albert Canal. On April 1, 1996, the northern premetro axis is officially opened and put into use by tram route 3, which can now use the underground trajectory instead of its original itinerary over the Pothoekstraat and Kerkstraat. From Astrid station near Antwerp Central Station, the route would use the central premetro axis toward the Groenplaats. Because of the construction of the metro tunnel link with Linkeroever some years earlier, the route was at the same time extended to the Linkeroever terminus, where a new platform was built to accommodate the line.

On February 16, 2002, route 3 was extended from Linkeroever to the Zwijndrecht-Melsele border, a 4,3 km trajectory, where a P+R facility was built. On September 1, 2002, the route was once again extended, this time on a 1,6 km trajectory toward the newly built Keizershoek P+R in Merksem.

== Colour ==
This line's colour on maps is black text on a yellow background.

== Route ==
14.5 km (9 mi) (40 min, 22 km/h or 14 mph) via Bredabaan (Merksem) - Frans de l'Arbrelaan - Burgemeester Gabriël Theunisbrug - premetro Northern branch (stations Sport, Schijnpoort, Handel, Elisabeth, Astrid) - premetro Western branch (stations Opera, Meir, Groenplaats, Van Eeden) - Blancefloerlaan - Verbrandendijk - Dorp Oost - (park) - Dorp West - Beversebaan - Park&Ridezone Melsele Kruispunt.

== Rolling stock ==
Most trams on route 3 are of the newer HermeLijn type. The older PCC cars can only sporadically be seen on the route when an event at the Sportpaleis is taking place and extra capacity is needed to transport all the visitors.

== Future ==
During the construction works concerning the elevation of the Gabriel Theunis bridge over the Albert Canal, tram traffic between Merksem and the Sportpaleis will not be possible. The elevation of the bridge to a height of 9.1 m (29 ft 10 in) is necessary to allow bigger ships on the canal, as a part of a general program to increase the share of water transport and lower that of road cargo transport in the congested Antwerp region. Works were originally planned to start in 2014, but due to delays only started in April 2019. Planning is now for the bridge to be delivered in April 2021.

In the distant future, the line might be extended to Beveren (to the west) and Brasschaat (to the north). However, the extension to Brasschaat in particular has been subject to considerable controversy, as fears exist among inhabitants that the town might lose it distinct atmosphere, and become too urbanized after the construction of a tramway. Concrete plans for the extension have been prepared, but, as many citizens and local politicians have ousted themselves against the construction of the tramway, including mayor Jan Jambon, its construction in the near future seems highly unlikely.

== See also ==
- List of town tramway systems in Belgium
