= Antwerp Pre-metro =

Belgian light rail network

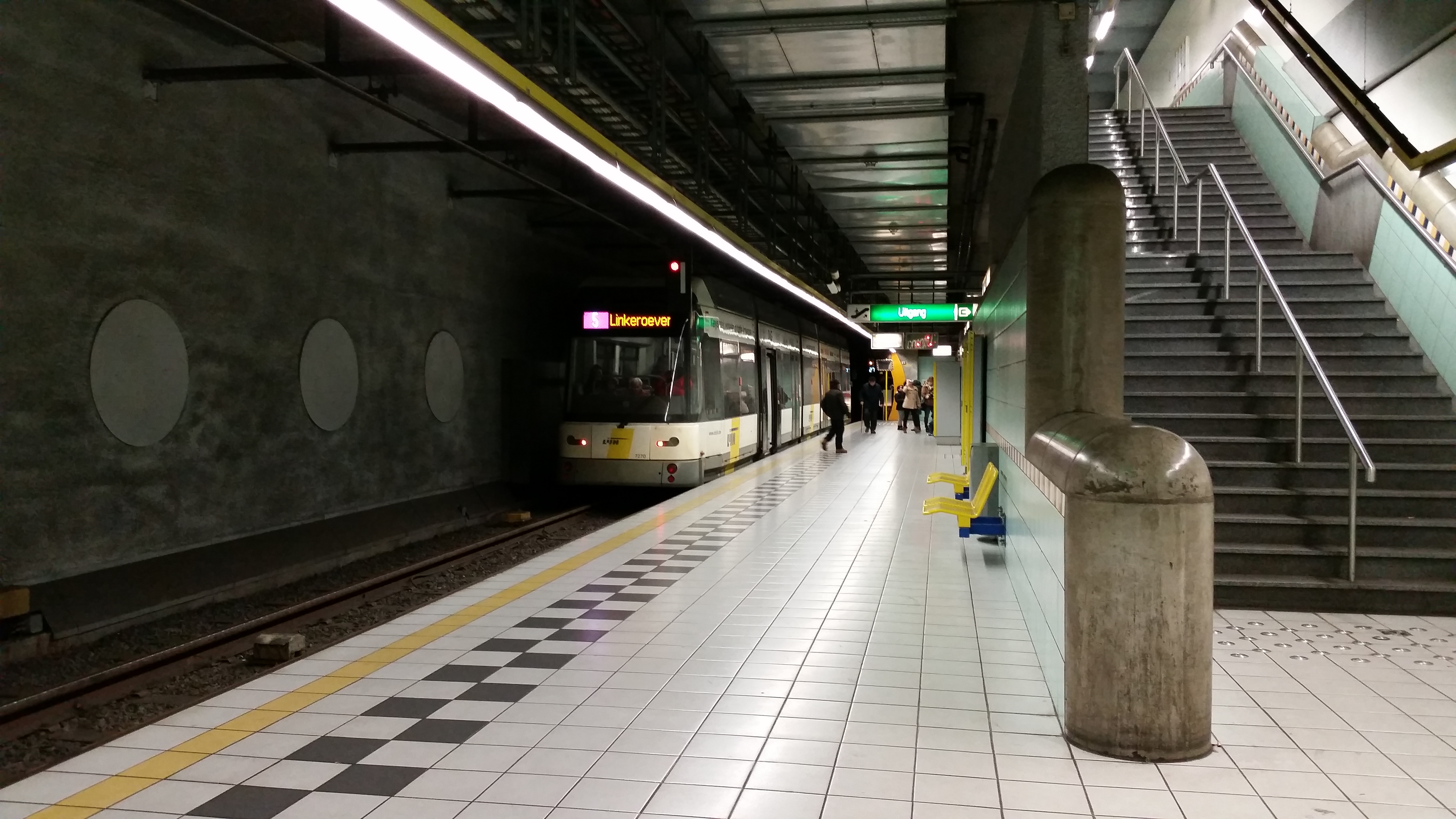
Tram at Handel station.

The Antwerp Premetro is a premetro system consisting of lines 2, 3, 5, 6, 8, 9, 10 and 15 of the Antwerp Tram network. It is a metre gauge system which runs underground in the city centre and further out on surface lines, which are mostly separated from motor vehicle traffic. The network is operated by De Lijn.

== History ==
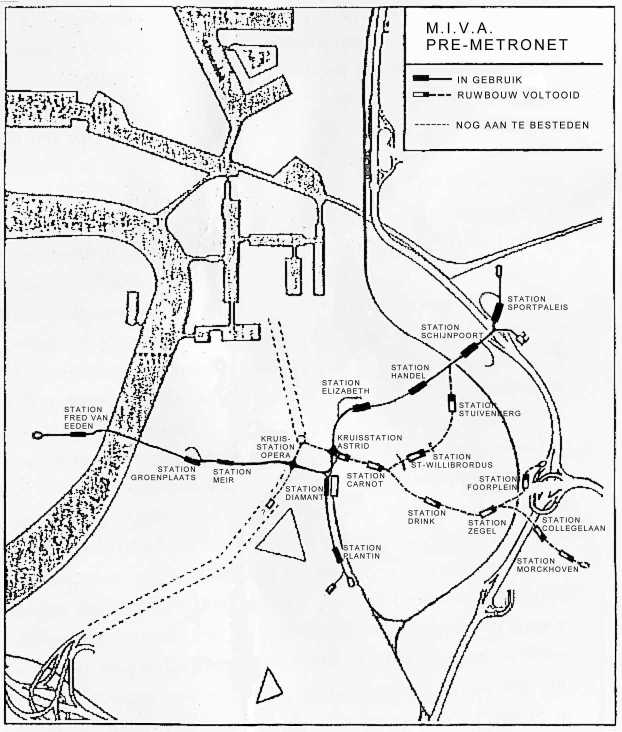
Original plan

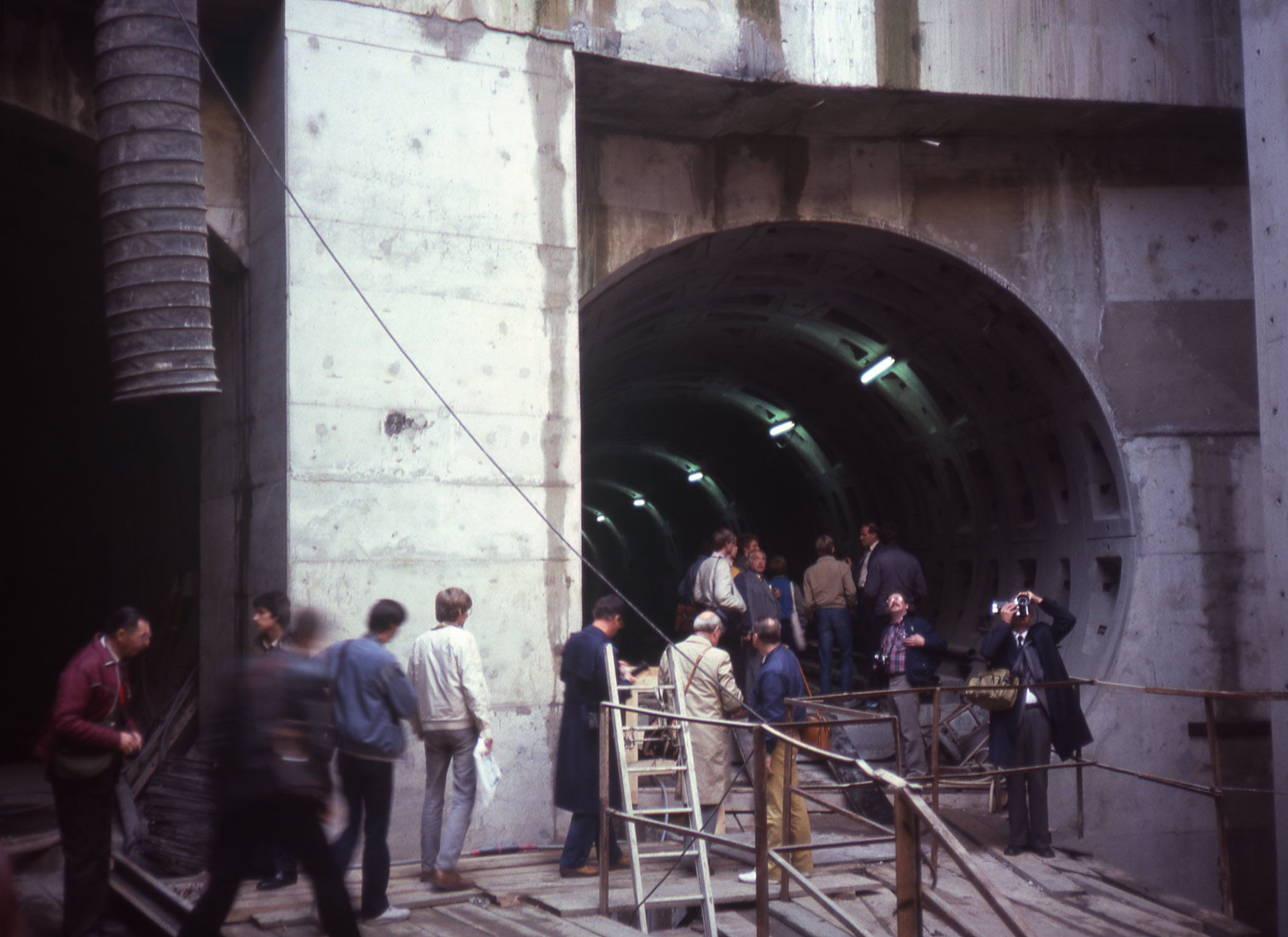
Construction of the premetro tunnels (November 1984)

The network began construction on 5 January 1970 and was originally intended to become a fully underground network similar to the Brussels Metro or German Stadtbahnen (light railways), with a length of 15 km (9.3 mi) and comprising 22 stations. However, due to financial difficulties, the conversion to metro was scrapped and only 19 stations were built, 7 of those still unused.

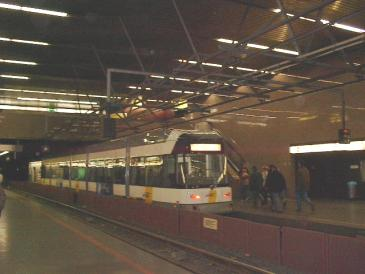
Tram on Line 15 to Mortsel at Meir pre-metro station (September 2005)

The first 1.3 km (0.81 mi) section opened on 25 March 1975 between Opera and Groenplaats, including station Meir. This line was extended to reach Diamant and Plantin in 1980 and Van Eeden (via the Brabotunnel under the river Scheldt) in 1990. A north-eastern branch was opened in 1996, including the stations Sport, Schijnpoort, Handel, Elisabeth and Astrid, connecting to the existing line between Opera and Diamant.

In the original plan a second axis was proposed from the south-western suburbs via Opera and Astrid to the eastern district Deurne. A metro tunnel was built under the Turnhoutsebaan in Borgerhout, as well as some shorter tunnels, as a part of these plans. However, construction stopped in the 1980s due to lack of funds. Although the tunnel itself was largely completed, the stations still had to be decorated and the track still had to be laid. Under the Pegasus plan (approved in 2004) it was decided to finally open this unused premetro tunnel, although, to reduce the costs of the project, it was decided only to open Zegel station. The stations Carnot, Drink, College and Morckhoven were not opened, but fitted to be used as emergency exits. This axis was opened partially in 2015.

A second entrance from Deurne Turnhoutsebaan towards the "Reuzenpijp"-tunnel under Borgerhout was opened in September 2017. Underground station Foorplein remains unused.

A tunnel linking Schijnpoort on the first axis with Carnot on the second one will be opened in 2027.

== Network ==
Network map in 2023

=== Stations ===
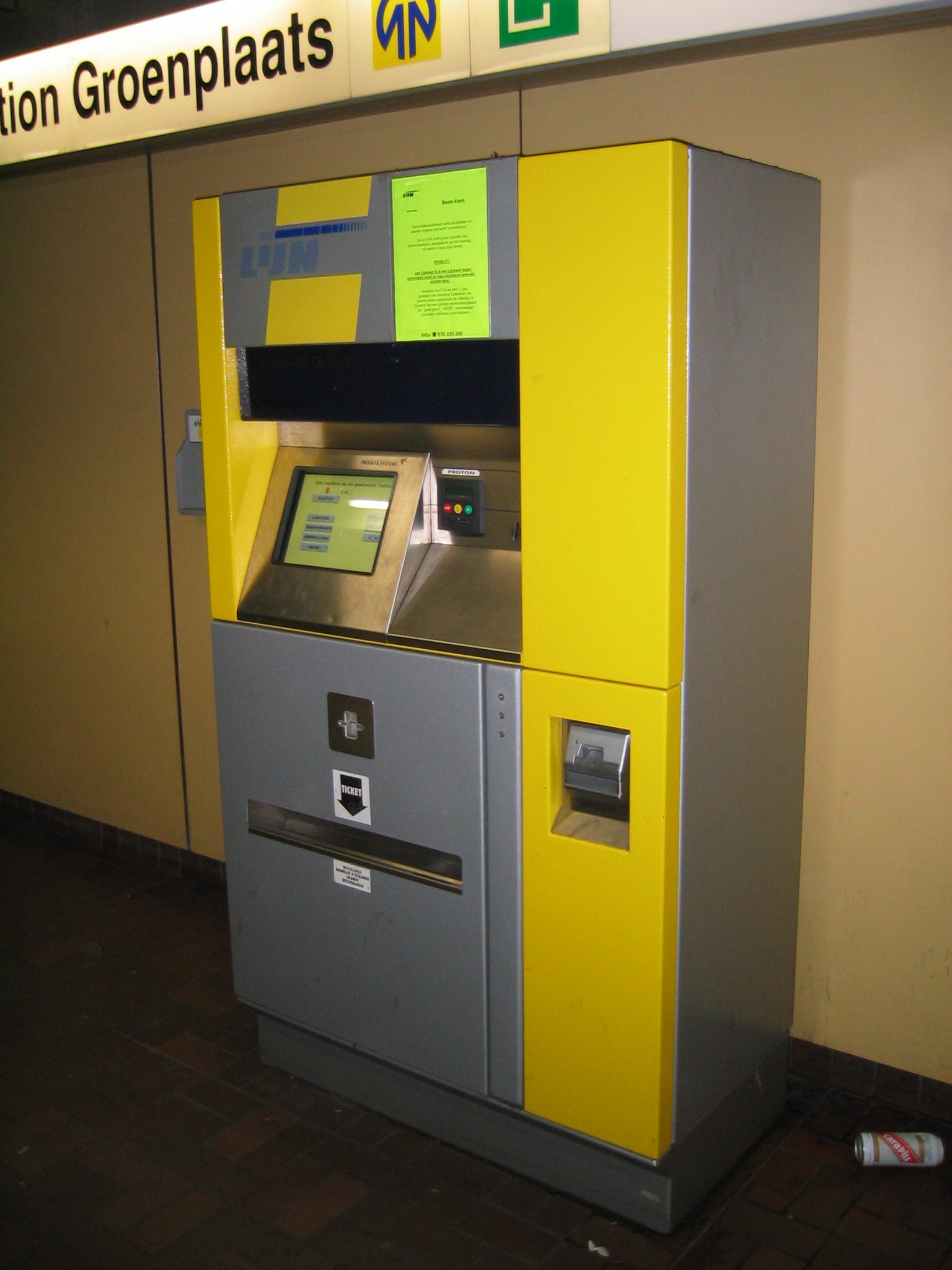
Ticket machine

The network consists of 19 stations, of which 12 are currently in use. Of the remaining 7, 4 are scheduled to be put in service while 3 remain unused in all plans.

- Astrid (partly opened in 1996, fully opened in 2015, connecting with the Central station)
- Diamant (opened in 1980, also connecting with the Central station)
- Elisabeth (opened in 1996)
- Groenplaats (opened in 1975)
- Handel (opened in 1996)
- Meir (opened in 1975)
- Opera (partly opened in 1975, fully opened in 2019)
- Plantin (opened in 1980)
- Schijnpoort (opened in 1996)
- Sport (opened in 1996)
- Van Eeden (the only station on the left bank of the river Scheldt, opened in 1990)
- Zegel (opened in 2015)
- Carnot (not in use)
- Drink (planned open 2026)
- Collegelaan (not in use)
- Morckhoven (planned open 2026)
- Foorplein (not in use)
- Sint-Willibrordus (planned open 2027)
- Stuivenberg (planned open 2027)

The stations Astrid and Opera were originally only partly opened, both having unused platforms inaccessible to travellers. However, the unused platforms on the −1 level in Astrid station were opened on 18 April 2015 as a part of the opening of the eastern premetro axis (the Reuzenpijp). In 2016, works have started on the renovation and extension of Opera station, as part of the Noorderlijn project. The unused platforms were put into use upon completion of the renovation and the construction of a premetro entrance on the Leien just south of the station.

=== Lines ===
- 2: Hoboken – Southern branch of axis 1 – Northern branch of axis 1 – Merksem
- 3: Zwijndrecht – Eastern branch of axis 1 – Northern branch of axis 1 – Merksem
- 5: Linkeroever – Eastern branch of axis 1 – Northern branch of axis 1 – Wijnegem
- 6: Olympiade – Southern branch of axis 1 – Northern branch of axis 1 – Luchtbal
- 8: Wommelgem – axis 2 – Astrid
- 9: Linkeroever – Eastern branch of axis 1 – Southern branch of axis 1 – Eksterlaar
- 10: Wijnegem – axis 2 – Hoboken
- 15: Linkeroever – Eastern branch of axis 1 – Southern branch of axis 1 – Boechout

== Future ==
Underground station Foorplein will probably only remain used as an emergency exit.

In September 2021, 60 million euros in funding was earmarked to open the unused tunnel under Kerk & Pothoekstraats. Two intermediate stations along this route at Stuivenberg and Willibrod are planned. Additionally, two intermediate stations along the Turnhoutsbahn (which currently are bypassed as a quasi-express service on lines 8 & 10) will be opened at Drink and Morckhoven. It has not yet been announced how service will be modified by the new stations/tunnel. The target opening was 2024.

== See also ==
- Trams in Antwerp
- Tram route 3 (Antwerp)
- List of premetro systems
- Lists of rapid transit systems
