= Tram route 8 (Antwerp) =

Overview
- Locale: Antwerp
- Termini: Wommelgem Roundabout P+R; Astrid (Antwerp premetro station)
- Stations: 7
- Color on map: black text on pink background

Service
- Type: tram
- System: Antwerp tram network
- Operator(s): De Lijn
- Rolling stock: PCC (single), HermeLijn

History
- Opened: 8 December 2019

Tram route 8 is a tram route in Antwerp and nearby Wommelgem. The present day route was opened on 8 December 2019 connecting the Astrid premetro station with the Wommelgem Roundabout (Dutch: "Rond punt van Wommelgem") P+R. The route was the first to use the newly opened premetro tunnel under Borgerhout, called the Reuzenpijp, which begins at Astrid station and comes above ground just before the Muggenberg stop. It is promoted as a "fast tram" (sneltram) route, as most stations in the premetro tunnel have not (yet) been opened, allowing a 15-minute connection between the city center and the Wommelgem P+R.

== Trajectory ==
Tram route 8 begins at the Wommelgem Roundabout P+R terminus. From there, it runs westward alongside the E313 to the Ruggeveldlaan. Via the Florent Pauwelslei and Herentalsebaan, the route then joins the older trajectory of tram 24. Past the Muggenberg stop, route 8 enters the recently opened premetro tunnel, while tram 24 uses the older above ground tracks. Underground, tram 8 follows the same trajectory as tram 24 does above ground, but, as most stations on the underground line have not (yet) been opened, it has far fewer stops. The route stops at Zegel station, and then continues on a non-stop trajectory under the Turnhoutsebaan and Carnotstraat towards Astrid station, near Antwerp Centraal station, its end stop.

== History ==
=== Previous route ===
Tram route 8 between 2009 and 2012

Originally tram route 8 ran between the Groenplaats in the city centre and the Eksterlaar terminus in Berchem. On 31 December 31, 1978, the part of route 3 between the Groenplaats and Lambermontplaats to the south was transferred to route 8. The tram 8 continued to run on the Eksterlaar-Lambermontplaats trajectory in the following decades, with an exception in 1988, when, due to construction works in the Lange Leemstraat, the route had to use the premetro tunnel to the Groenplaats for several months.

On 3 May 2007, the tram 8 was extended from the Lambermontplaats to the nearby Bolivarplaats, where the new Antwerp courthouse had recently been built. On 15 May 2009, the line was once again extended, this time from the Eksterlaar terminus to the Herentalsebaan, where it joined the trajectory of route 24 to the Silsburg terminus at the Deurne-Wommelgem border. On May 2, 2012, the line was shortened from the Bolivarplaats to the Groenplaats, due to construction works in the Nationalestraat.

On 1 September 2012, tram route 8 was suspended, and its trajectory was added to tram route 4 (formerly Hoboken-Sint-Pietersvliet). However, due to ongoing construction works at the Nationalestraat, it was temporarily impossible to join the trajectory with the original tram route 4, which was also shortened to the Marnixplaats. On February 9, 2013, the two parts of route 4 were connected to each other via a deviation over the Leien. On March 30, 2013, after the works in the Nationalestraat had finished, tram route 4 was able to start service on its definitive trajectory Hoboken-Silsburg. The colors of route 8, black text on an orange background, were transferred with the closing of the route on September 1 to a new tram route 9, running between the Eksterlaar terminus and Linkeroever P+R using the premetro network.

Works on the eastern premetro tunnel under the Carnotstraat and Turnhoutsebaan started in 1977, and were planned to open a few years later. After five years of tunneling and construction works, structural works on the tunnel and stations were largely finished, however, due to austerity measures imposed in the 1980s by the successive Martens governments, and the transfer of authority to the Flemish government after state reforms, construction on the premetro network was put to a halt. Although the extension of the central premetro axis to Linkeroever, and the construction of the northern premetro axis to the Sportpaleis were finished in the 1990s, no initiative was taken to open the eastern premetro axis until recently.

The creation of route 8 and the opening of the eastern "Reuzenpijp" premetro tunnel were a part of the 2020 mobility masterplan as the LIVAN project.

Originally, also another trajectory was considered in which the new route 8 would follow the trajectory of route 24 all the way to the Silsburg terminus, and would then turn north to the Wommelgem P+R either parallel to, or over the R11 road, in the first case going under the E313/E34 highway in a newly constructed tunnel. However, this plan was not adopted, and finally, it was decided to separate route 8 from route 24 near the AZ Monica hospital, after which route 8 would go north over the Ruggeveldlaan, passing under the E313/E34 using the already present bridge over the Ruggveldlaan. The route then turns east and uses a newly built "tram antenna" toward its destination. Also included in the LIVAN project was the construction of further tram tracks at the Ruggeveldlaan. These tracks, connecting the Herentalsebaan and Turnhoutsebaan, are currently only used by route 10 on its temporary detour through Deurne-Zuid. However, plans exist for the creation of a new north-south tram route making use of the tracks, replacing bus route 19.

The previous route 8 was officially opened on 18 April 2015 between the Astrid premetro station and the newly built Wommelgem P+R. From Astrid, the tram rides further towards Antwerp South Station.

=== Current Day Route (2019) ===
A tweet from DeLijn, on 17 October 2019, stated that Tram route would be changing, as part of the Northern Line (Noorderlijn) project in Antwerp City. Part of this would be the removal of all stops after Antwerp's Astrid Premetro Station.

It would no longer serve any connection to Antwerp South Station, and asks that anyone seeking to travel past Astrid Premetro Station, to take Tram 10 from Astrid Premetro Station to the south of Antwerp.

== Future ==
When the premetro entrance at the Frankrijklei will be finished in June 2017, route 8 will be extended to the Antwerp-South railway station via the Opera premetro station and then, after leaving the premetro, following the same trajectory as the above ground route 24. The trams will stop in Opera station at level -3, using new platforms perpendicular the ones now being used by routes 3,5,9 and 15, after it will be opened in September 2018. Earlier plans included a further extension to the Schoonselhof, but this route will now be included into route 10.

In the far future, route 8 could further be extended from Wommelgem to the Q8-highway station Ranst, however, no concrete plans exist up to this date.

== Rolling stock ==
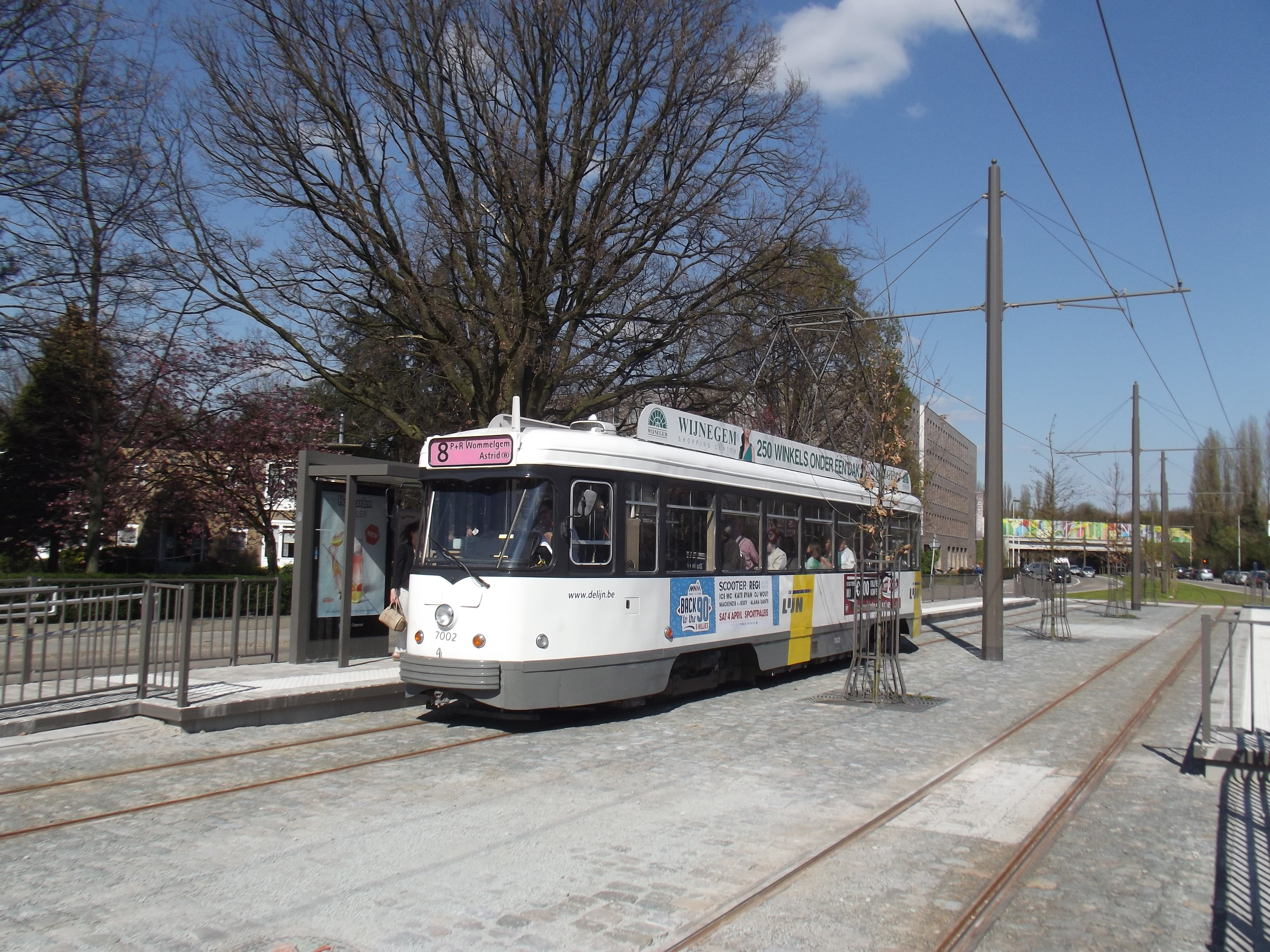
Single PCC car on route 8 at Burgemeester De Boey stop

Service on the previous route 8, suspended in 2012, was provided mainly by coupled PCC cars and HermeLijn trams.

Service on the present day route 8 is mainly provided by single PCC cars. The premetro tunnel between Astrid and Muggenberg is the first tunnel in the premetro network to receive a new security system, and most HermeLIjn trams are currently not yet equipped with this system. Converted HermeLijn trams can sporadically be seen on the route. The new Albatros Bombardier Flexity 2 trams are also equipped with the system, but are at present not used on route 8.
