= Wijnegem Shopping Center =

Coordinates: 51.2219°N 4.4997°E

Wijnegem Shop Eat Enjoy
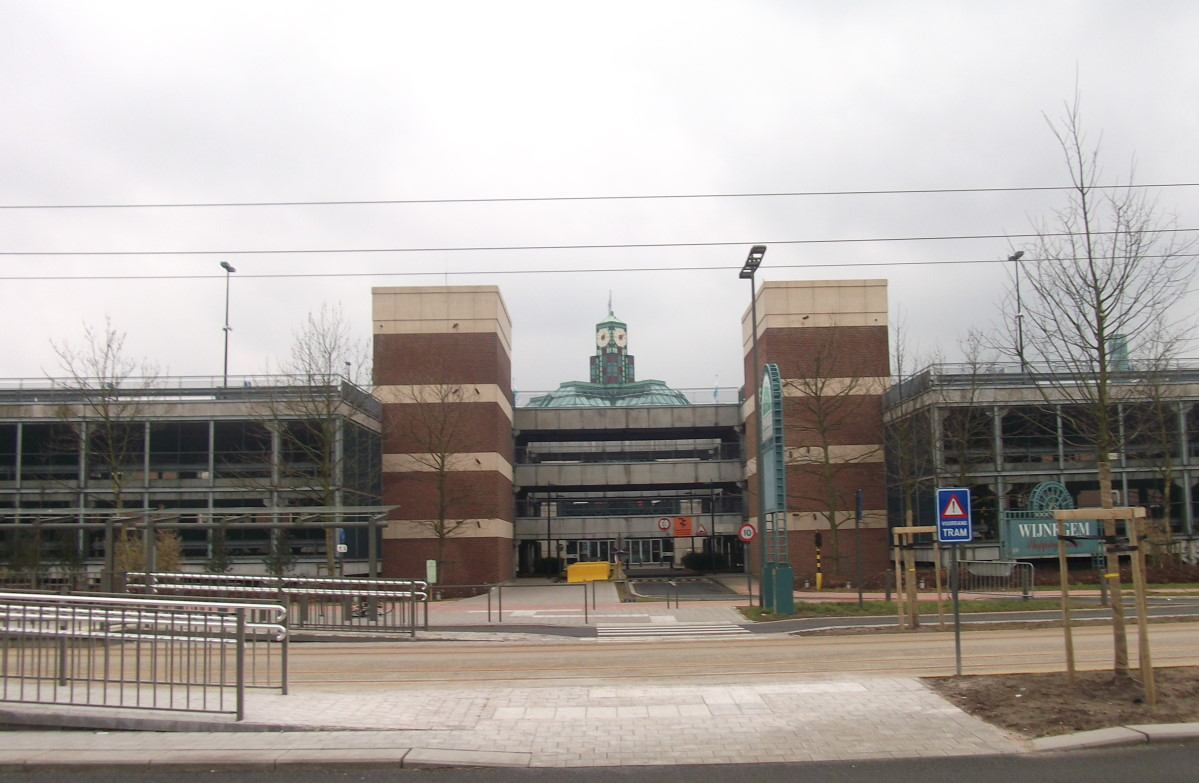
- Wijnegem Shop Eat Enjoy
- Location: Wijnegem, Belgium
- Opened: 1993
- Num. of stores: 250
- Floor area: 61,913 square metres (666,430 sq ft)
- Floors: 4
- Parking: 5000
- Website: Official Website

The Wijnegem Shop Eat Enjoy is a shopping mall in Wijnegem, near Antwerp, Belgium. It features 250 stores and has a gross leasable area of 61,913 square metres (666,430 sq ft), making it the largest shopping mall in Belgium and the Benelux. In 2018, the mall changed its name. The previous name was Wijnegem Shopping Center.

== See also ==
- List of shopping malls in Belgium
