= Antwerp tramway network =

Tram system in Antwerp, Belgium

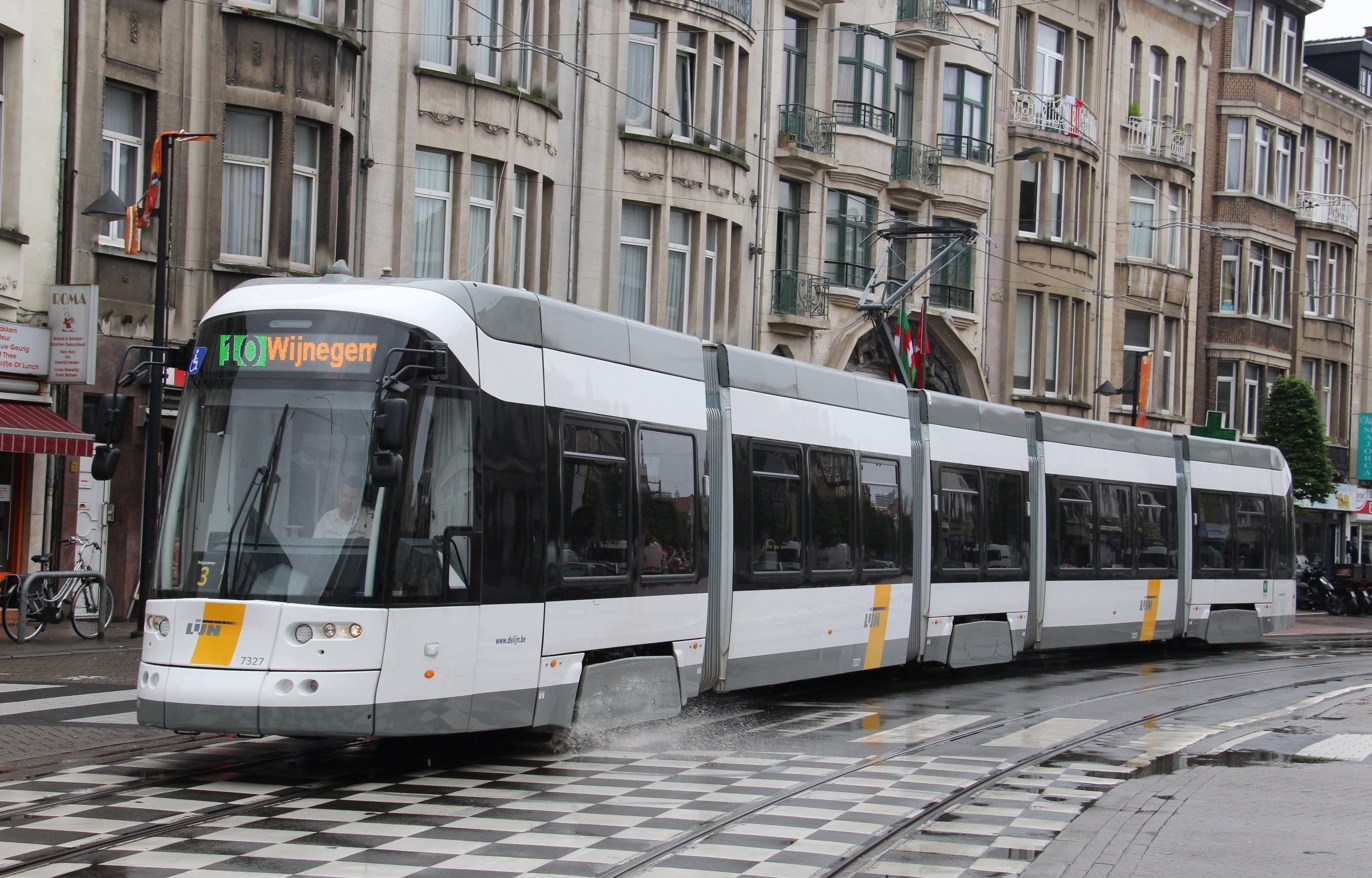
- An Albatros tram in Antwerp, 2016.

Operation
- Locale: Antwerp, Belgium

Statistics
Horsecar era: 1873–ca. 1902
- Status: Converted to electricity
- Operator: Eight separate companies
- Track gauge: 1,435 mm (4 ft 8 1/2 in) standard gauge
- Propulsion system: Horses
Electric tram era: since 1902
- Status: Operational
- Lines: 14
- Operators: Compagnie générale des tramways d'Anvers (CGTA) (1902–1927); Société anonyme des Tramways d'Anvers (1927–1962); Maatschappij voor het Intercommunaal Vervoer te Antwerpen (MIVA) (1963–1991); De Lijn (since 1991)
- Track gauge: 1,000 mm (3 ft 3 3/8 in) metre gauge
- Propulsion system: Electricity
- Electrification: 600 V DC Caternary
- Track length (total): 116.6 km (72.5 mi)
- Website: http://www.delijn.be/en/index.htm De Lijn (in English)

The Antwerp tramway network (Dutch: Het Antwerpse tramnet) is a network of tramways forming part of the public transport system in Antwerp, a city in the Flemish Region of Belgium. The network is operated by the Flemish region's transportation company De Lijn. As of April 2017, it featured fourteen lines, eight of which pass partially underground (known as Antwerp Pre-metro).

== General description ==
The Antwerp tram system features segments with different characteristics, from following along with street traffic to tunnels, which do not differ much from subway rail setup — 1,000 mm (3 ft 3 3/8 in) track gauge and a 600 volts catenary power feed.

The tram network is connected to the Flemish Tram and Bus Museum and heritage rides are regularly organised over the network with historical vehicles.

== Horse trams, and Omnibus ==
Horse-drawn trams were the predecessor of nowadays electric trams. The first mention for the existence of the «American Tram» (fr. Tramway Américain) as the horse tram was referred to, was in correspondence addressed to the citywide proprietors Ed. Paujaurd’hui and A. Edvard on 27 June 1865. However, just six years later (14 March 1871) the city council allowed for the construction of tram lines. The first horse tram line opened in Antwerp on 25 May 1873. It linked the church in Berchem (now a district of Antwerp) with the Meir, an avenue in the city center.

Nine years later, already 9 lines of horse-drawn trams existed in Antwerp. There was also one omnibus route. The public transport of Antwerp was exploited by nine different companies. One of them operated an omnibus, the other eight various horse tram routes.

== Electrification ==
The work permit for electrifying the tram system was granted to CGTA on 12 March 1902, following the application made on 22 November 1901. Along with electrification plans were made to rebuild lines from 1,435 mm (4 ft 8 1/2 in) standard gauge to 1,000 mm (3 ft 3 3/8 in) metre gauge.

The works started on the omnibus route Draakplaats — Grote Markt (now - route № 11). In fact this was the first real tram line on this route, since omnibuses are road transport, rather than rail transport. Therefore, there was no infrastructure before electrifying this line.

On 6 May 1902, following the former omnibus route, tracks were laid from Draakplaats to Nieuwstraat. After that the tracks started to be installed along with the electrification of the horse-drawn line on the boulevard ring (Leien). For a time, out of service omnibusses temporarily replaced horse-drawn cars. On 9 July 1902 horse drawn cars started to move on a former omnibus route segment from Nieuwstraat to Grote Markt.

The first gantry for an electric tram line was installed on 10 June 1902 on the Kunstlei boulevard (now Frankrijklei), between the crossing of De Keyserlei and the Gemeenteplaats (now Franklin Rooseveltplaats). On 13 August 1902 the catenary was connected to the temporary electric power substation, which was erected in a tram depot on Boudewijnstraat. Then the electric tram tests started. The normal operation of an electric tram started on 2 September 1902. First there was a mix of electric trams and horse cars on the line. The horse-drawn trams were later withdrawn from the boulevards of Antwerp.

== Tram lines since 8 December 2019 ==
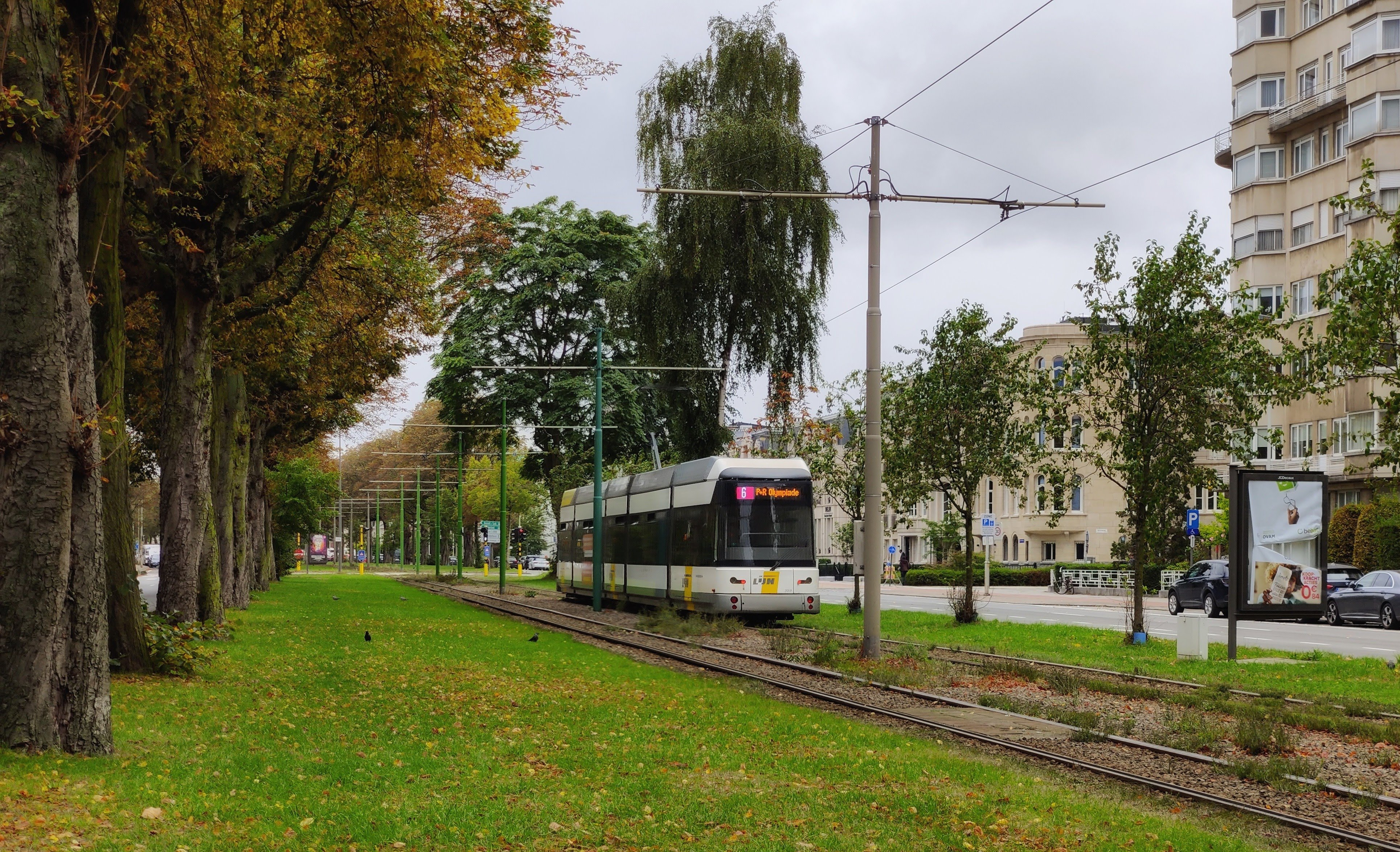
Tram 6 on Jan van Rijswijcklaan towards Olympiade P+R

There are currently many roadworks and changes going on in Antwerp, the tramlines have constant small changes every month, this information may be outdated.

line	route	journey time*	average speed*
1	P+R Luchtbal – Zuid	31 min	0 km/h (0 mph) ?
2	P+R Merksem – Zwaantjes**	47 min	0 km/h (0 mph) ?
A3	P+R Boechout – P+R Merksem	39 min	22 km/h (14 mph)
4	Zwaantjes** – Berchem Station	59 min	0 km/h (0 mph) ?
A9	Fortveld – Berchem Station	39 min	26 km/h (16 mph)
6	P+R Luchtbal – Kruishof	40 min	17 km/h (11 mph)
7	MAS – Gemeenteplein	34 min	17 km/h (11 mph)
8	Astrid - P+R Wommelgem	16 min	24 km/h (15 mph)
A9	Fortveld – Berchem Station***	26 min	0 km/h (0 mph) ?
10	P+R Schoonselhof – Fortveld	48 min	0 km/h (0 mph) ?
11	Melkmarkt –Berchem Station	20 min	0 km/h (0 mph) ?
12	Viséstraat – Centraal Station	14 min	0 km/h (0 mph) ?
15	P+R Merksem – P+R Boechout	43 min	0 km/h (0 mph) ?
24	Havenhuis – Silsburg	37 min	0 km/h (0 mph) ?

**** In works, will go back to Sportpaleis when finished

***** Temporary line, colors may not be correct, will go back to 3/5/9/15 in mid 2027

== Rolling stock ==
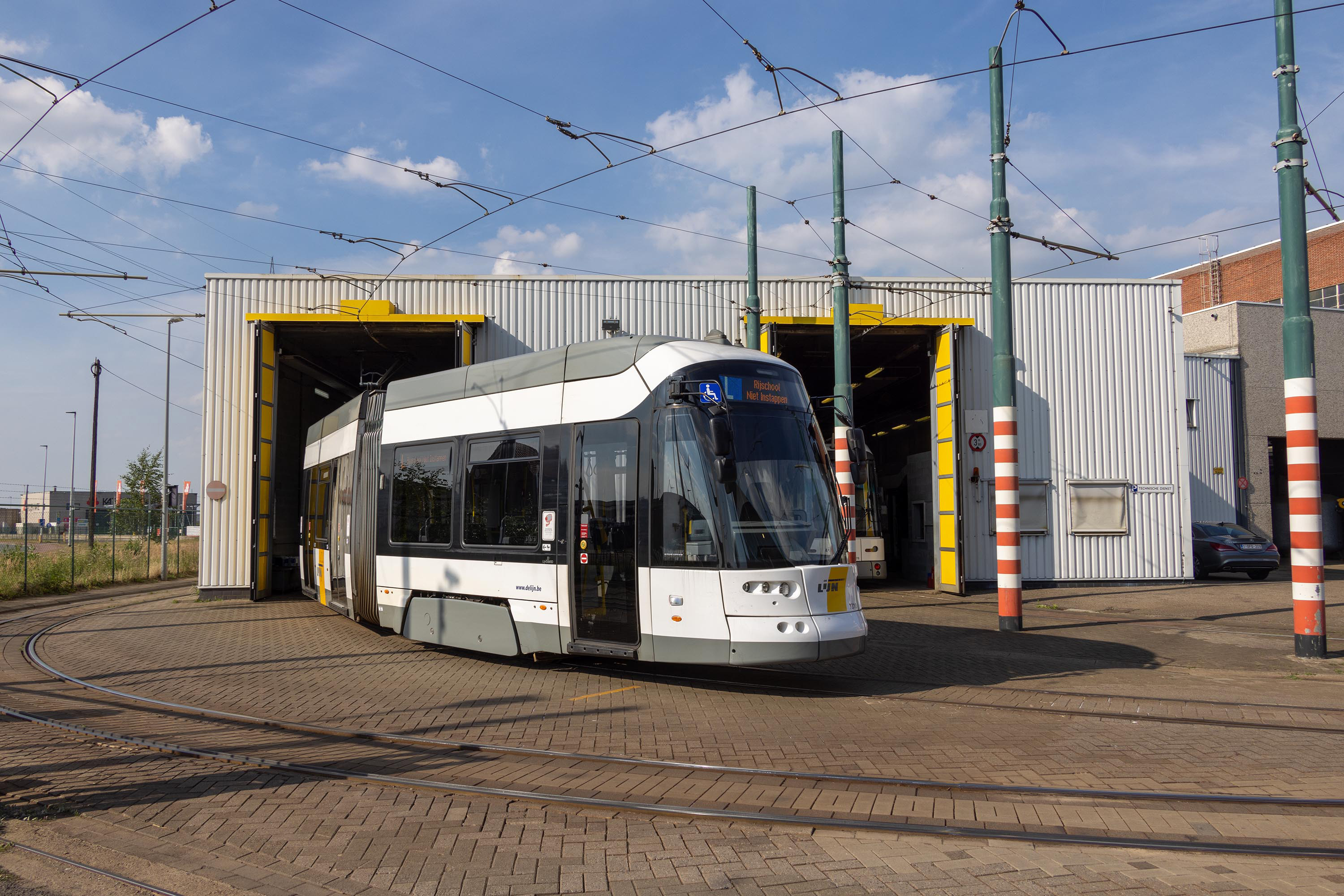
Albatros tram at the Punt Aan De Lijn depot

In August 2012, De Lijn ordered a fleet of Bombardier Flexity 2 trams, including 28 for Antwerp. These would replace many of the older PCC trams, and displace HermeLijn trams onto other routes. In 2022 there is fleet of 62 (so called) Albatros trams in service. There are 24 long (7-section and 43 m long) and 38 short (five-section and 31.8 m long) trams with numbers 7301-7362. Delivery of these vehicles ended in April 2018.

PCC cars are regularly used in coupled pairs. On 6 November 2017, De Lijn started testing so-called "mega-trams" consisting of two Hermelijnen coupled together, on route 3. The resulting trains are 61 metres long and can carry 500 passengers. Their use would increase the capacity of the underground sections of the line where the minimum headway has already reached its limit of 2 minutes. They may be introduced into service at the start of 2018.

In late 2017 new trams of type CAF Urbos 100 were ordered by De Lijn. 58 of them will run in Antwerp, the first one was delivered in November 2021. They got the numbers from 7401 onwards.

== See also ==
- Antwerp Pre-metro
- Flemish Tram and Bus Museum
- List of town tramway systems in Belgium
- Trams in Belgium
