= Tram route 6 (Antwerp) =

- Itinerary of tram route 6

Overview
- Locale: Antwerp
- Termini: Luchtbal Havana P+R; Olympiade P+R
- Stations: 27
- Color on map: white text on dark pink background

Service
- Type: tram
- System: Antwerp tram network
- Operator(s): De Lijn
- Rolling stock: PCC car (single and coupled), HermeLijn

History
- Opened: 27 October 2007

Tram route 6 is a tram route in Antwerp between the Metropolis P+R in the northern Luchtbal suburb and the Olympiade P+R in the southern Kiel neighborhood, using the pre-metro network between stations Sport and Plantin. The route was officially opened on 27 October 2007 and is operated by the Flemish transport company De Lijn.

== Trajectory ==
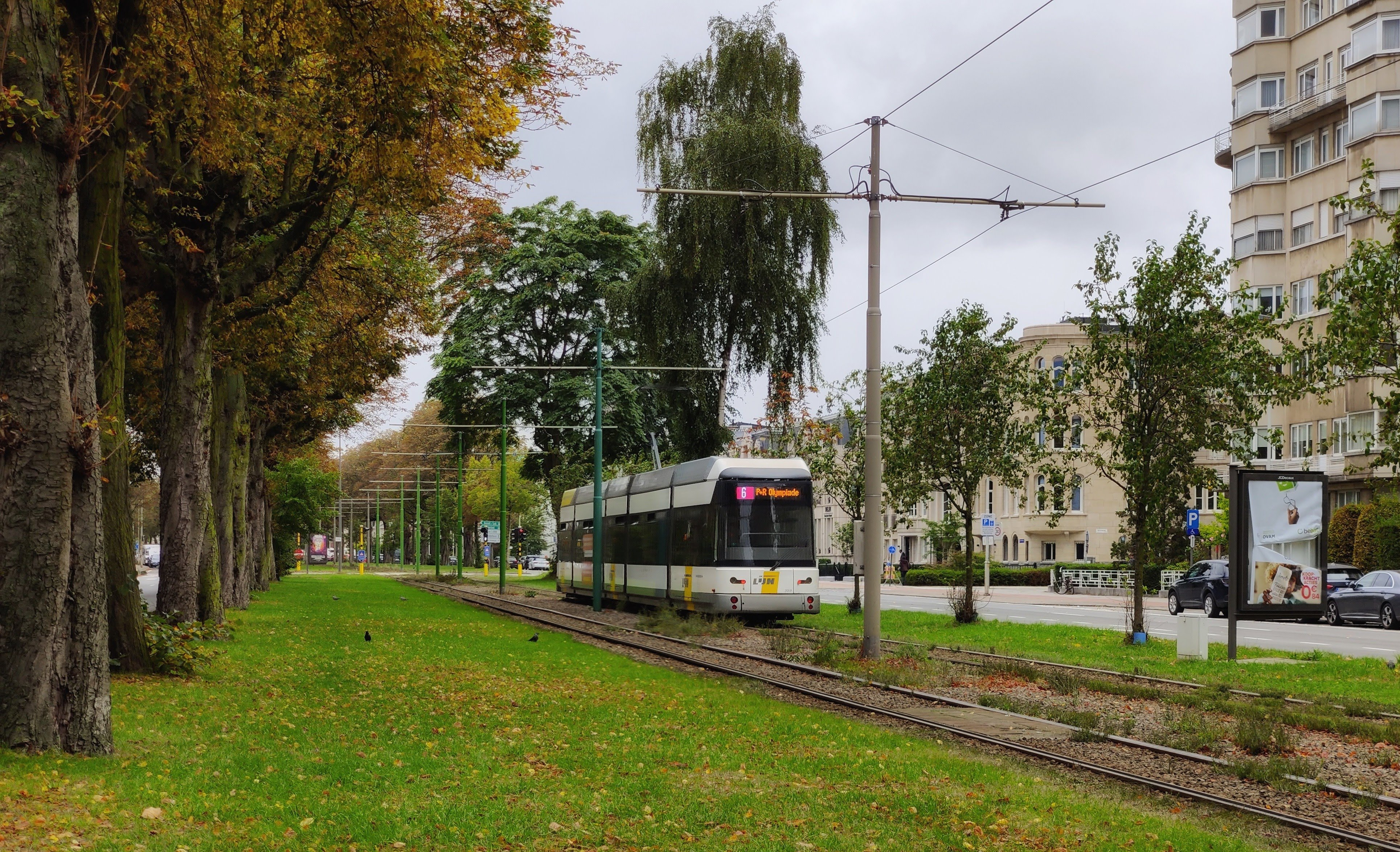
Tram 6 on Jan van Rijswijcklaan towards Olympiade P+R

Tram route 6 begins at the Metropolis P+R next to the Metropolis cinema complex in the southern part of the Luchtbal suburb. The route then uses the Groenendaallaan and Delbekelaan, before arriving at the Gabriel Theunis bridge over the Albert canal. After crossing the canal, the route enters the pre-metro network, which it uses between Sport to the north and Plantin to the south. After coming above ground near the Charlottalei, it follows the Belgielei to the Harmonie park, and then the Jan van Rijswijcklaan to its terminus Olympiade in the Kiel neighborhood.

Because of the large underground portion of the route, it is presented by De Lijn as a rapid tram route. Also, it is known and promoted as an "event route", because it connects various event hubs in the city, like the Kinepolis cinema, the sportpaleis stadion, Antwerp Central Station, the Antwerp zoo (and until 2017 Aquatopia), the UGC cinema, the Koningin Elisabethzaal, the diamond museum, the deSingel art centre and Antwerp Expo, where fairs are regularly held (most notably the annual Antwerp book fair).

== History ==
=== Historical route (-1938) ===
The original tram route 6, also known as the "port route", ran between the Stuivenberg hospital and the present day Bolivarplaats (at the time, still the site of Antwerp-Zuid station), using the Lange Beeldekensstraat, Diepestraat, Brouwersvliet to the quays at the river Scheldt, and then following the quays all the way to its southern terminus. In 1938, the tram route was replaced by a trolleybus route, having a depot in the Somméstraat. On 30 March 1964, this trolleybus route itself was replaced by a regular bus route. The original trajectory is now a part of circular bus route 30/34 (depending on the direction of travel).

=== Present day route (2007-present) ===
On Saturday 27 October 2007, a new tram route 6 was opened, functioning as a new north–south connection through the pre-metro network, where previously, all pre-metro lines ran between Linkeroever in the west, and either northern or southern Antwerp. Although the route added some new parts to the operational tram network in Antwerp, no new tracks or tunnels had to be built. The largest part of the trams route, between the Gasthuishoeve stop and Astrid, and between Diamant and the Olympiade terminus, were already being used by tram routes 2,3 (and partially 5 and 15). The part between the Kinepolis terminus and the Gasthuishoeve stop was not in use by a regular tram route before the opening of route 6, but was already built, and was used by trams when going to, or coming from the "Punt aan de Lijn" depot next to the Kinepolis complex. The small part of the pre-metro network between Astrid and Diamant stations, part of a railway triangle, was also already present, but was until then only used by trams when not in service. Also the turning loop at the Olympiade was already present. This meant that only small works had to be done at the stops to enable service on route 6. After its opening, further works were executed at the Kinepolis and Olympiade turning loops.

As a part of the Masterplan 2020, the route was extended to the newly built Luchtbal (Havanasite) P+R in the northern part of the Luchtbal suburb on 3 June 2017, using new tram tracks on the renewed Noorderlaan. The trams had already stopped using the old Kinepolis turning loop on 5 November 2016, instead using a temporary loop at the nearby tram depot until the completion of the works. The extension of route 6 to the Luchtbal P+R is a part of the larger Noorderlijn project, aimed at improving public transport in the northern parts of Antwerp, and also including the renewal and construction of tram tracks of the Frankrijklei and Italiëlei, the renewal of the Operaplein and tram extensions in the Eilandje neighbourhood.

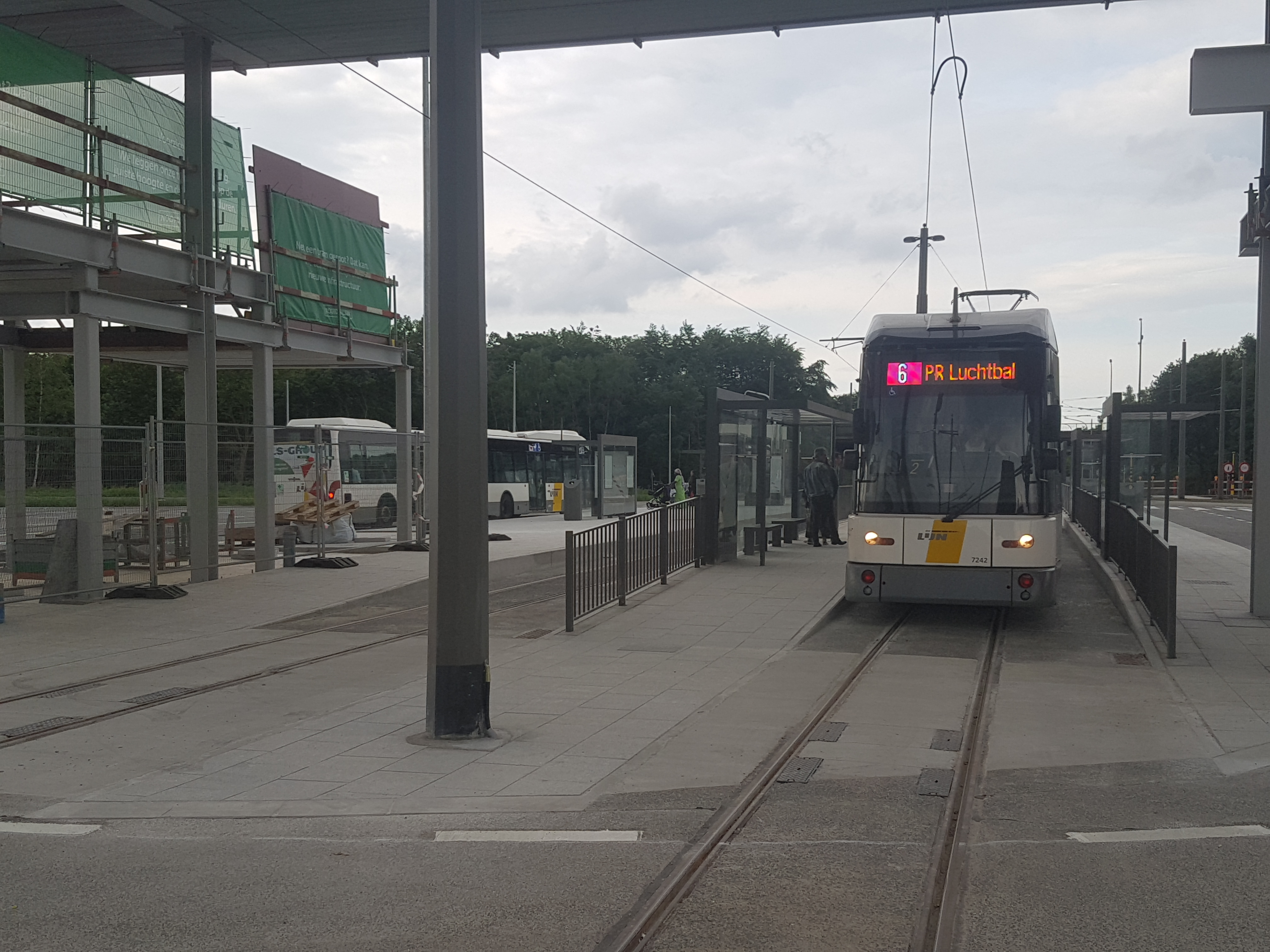
Tram 6 at its northern terminus

== Future ==
During the construction works concerning the elevation of the Gabriel Theunis bridge over the Albert Canal, tram traffic between Merksem and the Sportpaleis will not be possible. The elevation of the bridge to a height of 9.1 m is necessary to allow bigger ships on the canal, as a part of a general program to increase the share of water transport and lower that of road cargo transport in the congested Antwerp region. Works were originally planned to start in 2014, but due to delays only started in April 2019. Planning is now for the bridge to be delivered in April 2021.

In 2019, route 6 should be joined by a new tram route 1, between Metropolis and the Havana site, replacing bus route 23.

Also, plans are being studied to extend the route in the south to Wilrijk, and, via the Antwerp University Hospital (UZA), to the Drie Eikenstraat in Edegem.

== Rolling stock ==
After its opening, tram route 6 was almost exclusively served by the more recent HermeLijn trams. After 1 May 2010, a lot of the Hermelijn trams were transferred to the busier routes 2, 8 and 11. At present, the line is serviced by both HermeLijn trams and PCC cars (single and coupled).
