= Wijnegem =

- Municipality
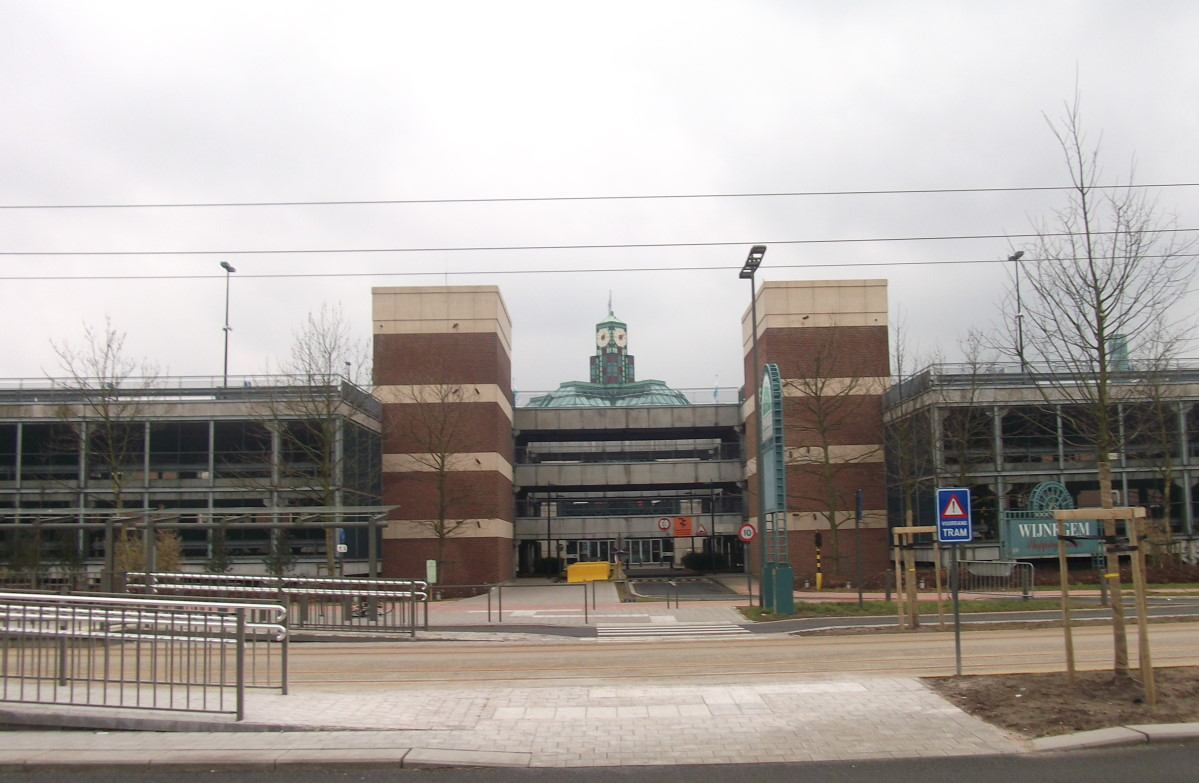
- Wijnegem Shopping Center

- Flag Coat of arms

- Location of Wijnegem in the province of Antwerp
- Interactive map of Wijnegem
- Location in Belgium
- Coordinates: 51°14′N 04°32′E
- Country: Belgium
- Community: Flemish Community
- Region: Flemish Region
- Province: Antwerp
- Arrondissement: Antwerp

Government
  - Mayor: Tom Tachelet (dorpspartij durf!])
  - Governing parties: N-VA, Durf!

Area
  - Total: 7.88 km^{2} (3.04 sq mi)

Population (2018-01-01)
  - Total: 9,711
  - Density: 1,230/km^{2} (3,190/sq mi)
- Postal codes: 2110
- NIS code: 11050
- Area codes: 03
- Website: www.wijnegem.be

Wijnegem (Dutch pronunciation: [ˈʋɛinəɣɛm]) is a municipality located in the Belgian province of Antwerp. The municipality only comprises the town of Wijnegem proper. Wijnegem is one of the most expensive municipalities of the Flanders. In 2021, Wijnegem had a total population of 10,084. The total area is 7.86 km^{2} (3.03 sq mi). Wijnegem has the biggest shopping mall in the Benelux, the Wijnegem Shopping Center

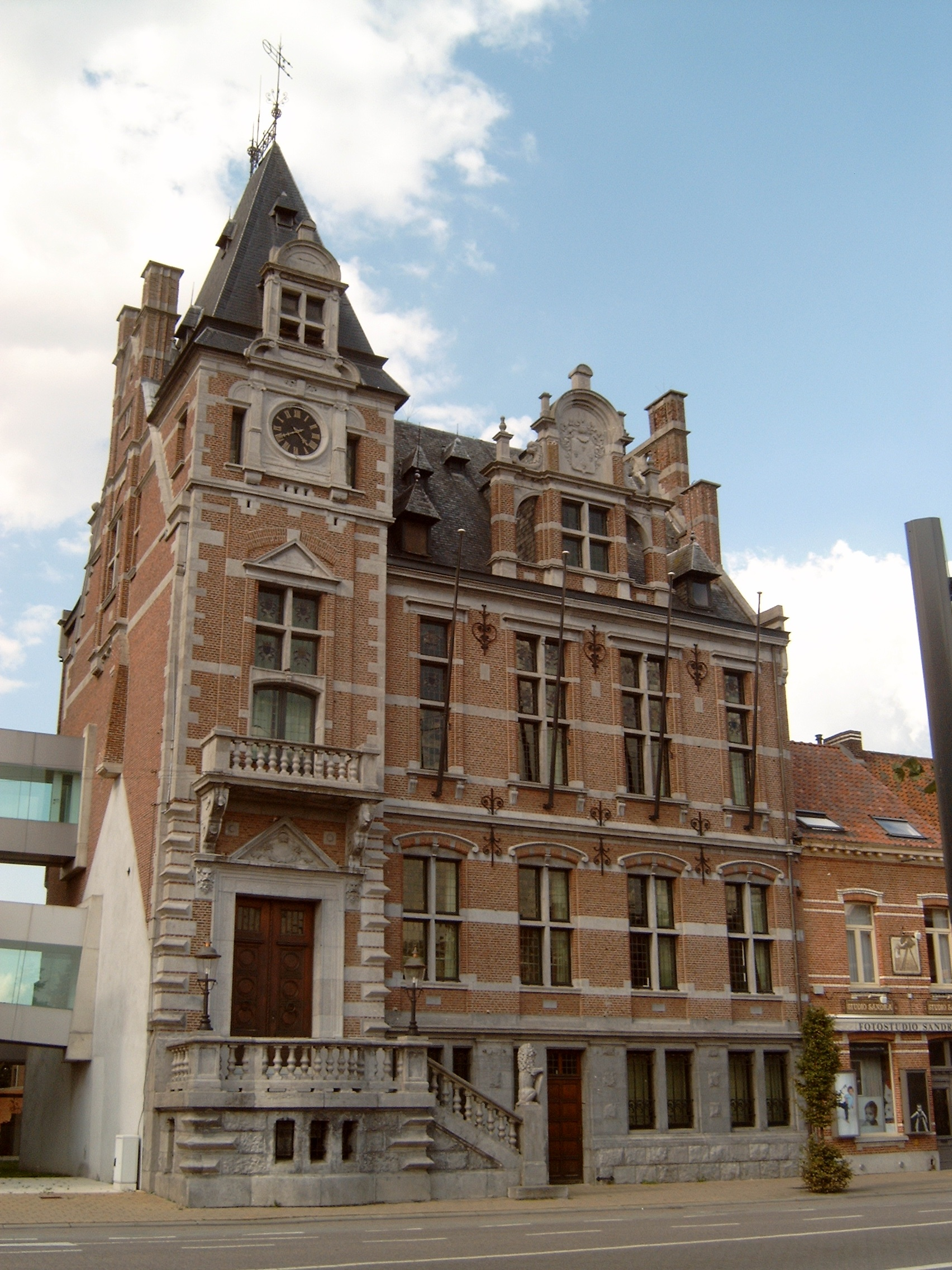
monumental building
