= De Lijn =

Flemish public transport corporation

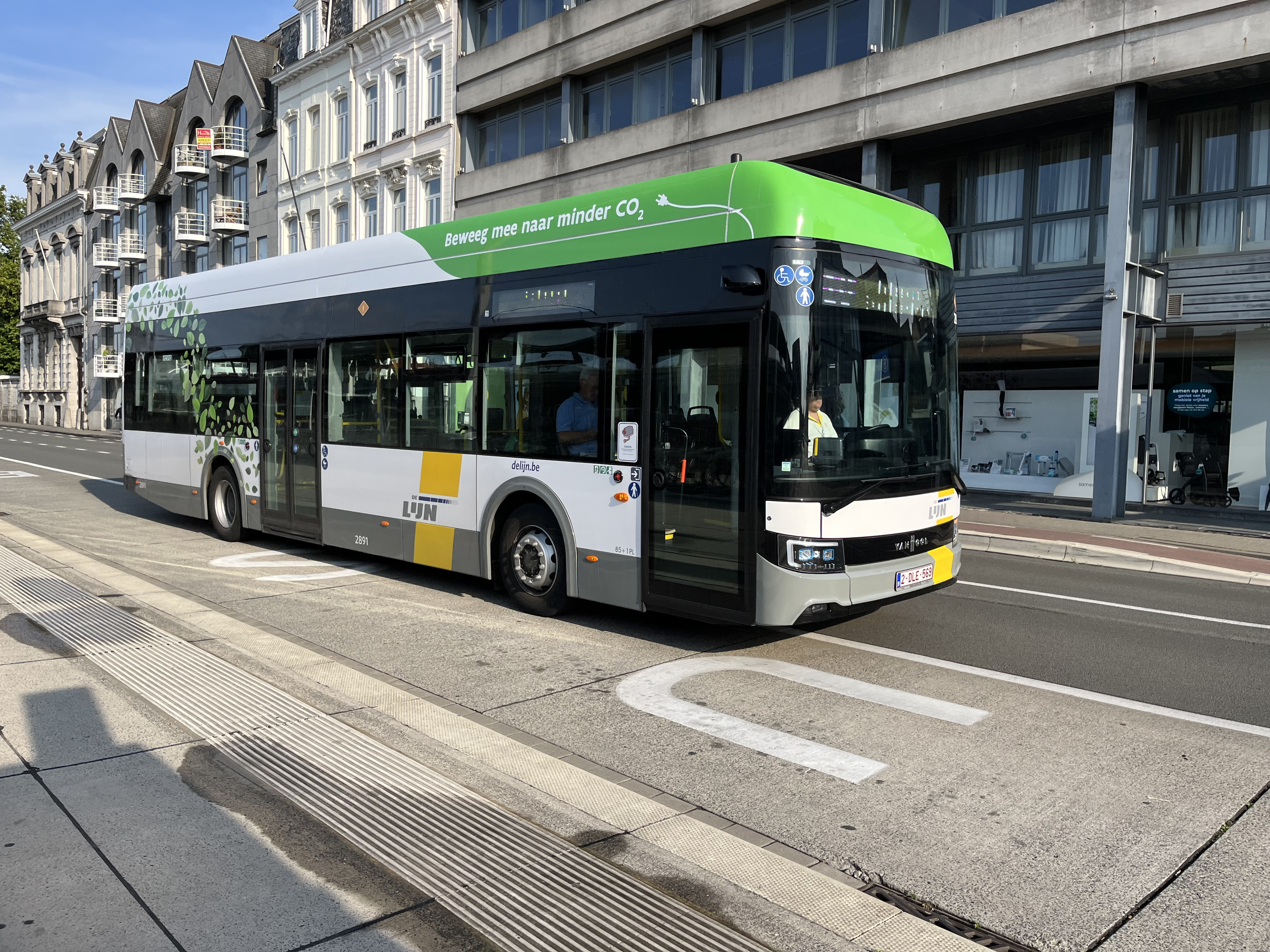
- De Lijn's Van Hool A12 Electric bus in Kortrijk station's terminus
- Parent: Flemish Government
- Founded: 1991
- Headquarters: Mechelen
- Service area: Flemish Region (mainly)
- Service type: bus service, tram, demand responsive transport
- Chief executive: Ann Schoubs
- Website: www.delijn.be

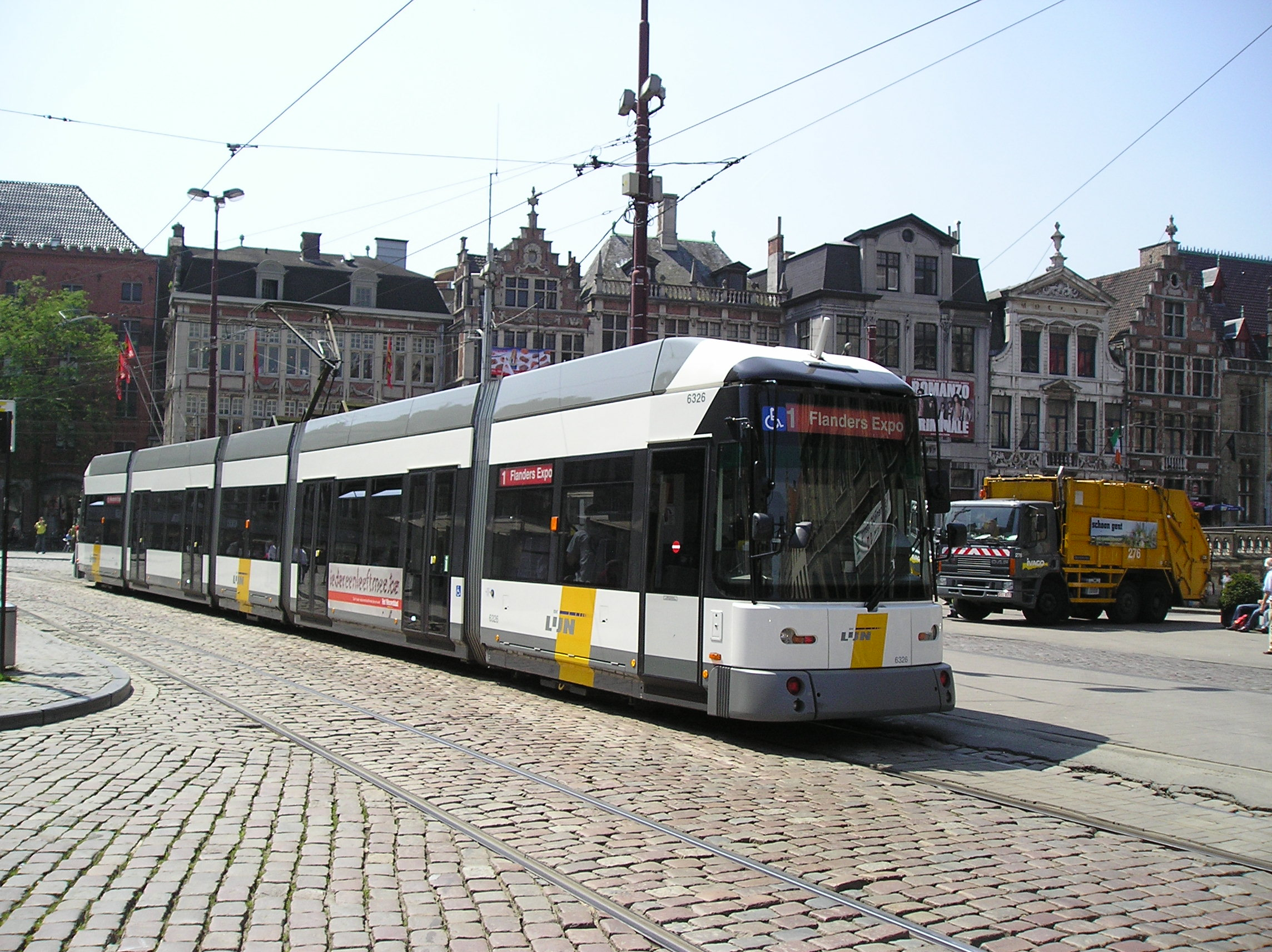
De Lijn tram in Ghent

Vlaamse Vervoersmaatschappij De Lijn (Dutch pronunciation: [ˈvlaːmsə vərˈvuːrsmaːtsxɑˌpɛi də ˈlɛin], English: "Flemish transport company 'The Line'"), more commonly known as De Lijn, is a state-owned enterprise run by the Flemish Government in Belgium to provide public transport with about 2240 buses and 399 trams. De Lijn was founded in 1991 after the public transport companies of Antwerp and Ghent merged with the Flemish part of the NMVB (Nationale Maatschappij van Buurtspoorwegen, or the "National Company of Local Railways").

Socialist politician Steve Stevaert of Hasselt implemented a policy allowing registered residents in Flanders aged 65+ to ride anywhere in Flanders free. This has since been changed to allowing inhabitants aged 65+ to purchase cheap annual passes which are valid throughout de Lijn. For 56 euros, senior citizens can now travel freely as often as they wish. Other incentives exist for people under the age of 25. De Lijn is viewed as an important tool in reducing heavy traffic congestion, together with the NMBS, Belgium's national rail operator.

In 2016, it transported more than 518.8 million passengers in an area with a population of approximately 6.5 million.

De Lijn operates:

- The Antwerp Tramway, with both street running and underground light rail (Antwerp Pre-metro).
- The Ghent Tramway, mostly street running with some reserved track.
- The Coast Tram, an interurban line along the whole Belgian coast, between De Panne and Knokke.
- All urban, suburban and intercity buses in Flanders. Because of the dense rail network, intercity buses - indicated by the prefix X - serve as local transport between big cities and smaller communities. The time taken to travel from one city to another by bus is usually longer than for the same journey on the train because bus lines are less straight, as they pass through many small towns that are not served by rail. The buses are more city-style (no coaches are used). In the province of Limburg, where there are few railways, buses are the main mode of intercity travel. There are also express intercity buses there.

Fares are the same on all modes of transport and may be purchased online, from a ticket machine, or contactlessly on the vehicle.

De Lijn issues a smartcard called the Lijnkaart and runs a chain of shops under the name Lijnwinkel.

De Lijn also supports the Flemish Tram and Bus Museum, located in Antwerp and connected to the tracks of the Antwerp Tramway.

== See also ==
- TEC – equivalent company in Wallonia
- MIVB-STIB – equivalent company in Brussels
