= Transport in Flanders =

Transport in Flanders is run in two levels regarding the federal nature of Belgium with certain functions run on behalf of the national Cabinet of Belgium and other functions run on behalf of Flemish Government. Therefore, the railways are run at national level by NMBS and are under the auspices of the Cabinet of Belgium, whilst the light railways are run at regional level by De Lijn under the auspices of the Flemish Government. The railway infrastructure is managed by Infrabel and thus is under the auspices of the Cabinet of Belgium.

== Railways ==
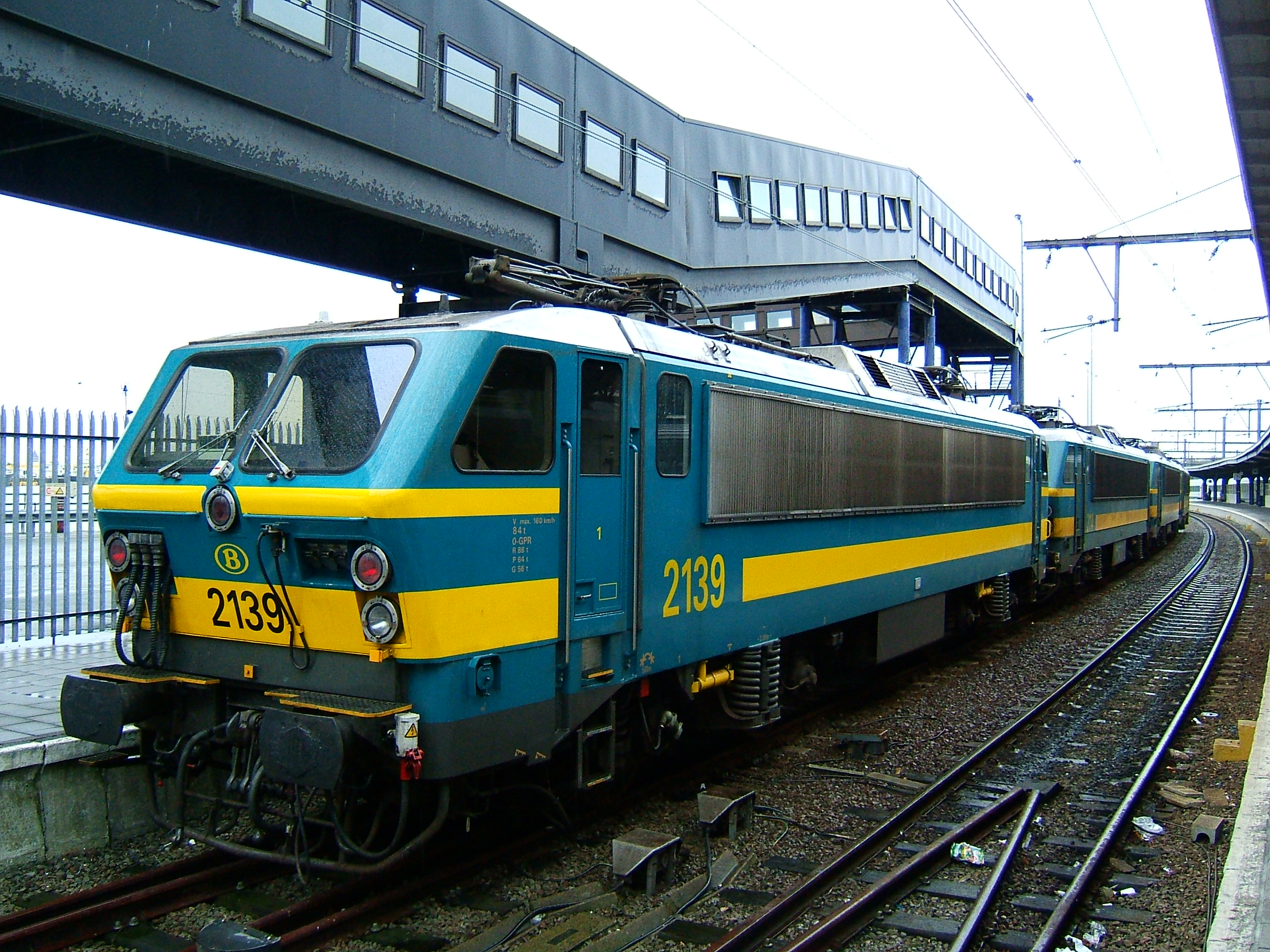
Oostende with a NMBS Class 21.

The NMBS runs frequent trains across Flanders connecting the 142 stations in the region with each other, with Brussels and Wallonia and in some cases with France, The Netherlands, Luxembourg or Germany. Except for a few 'cities' (that generally have obtained the city status a long time ago and now only have around 10.000 citizens) in West Flanders and Limbourg, all Flemish cities as well as most villages have important railway stations. The most important railway line is the Belgian railway line 50A connecting Oostende with Brugge, Gent-Sint-Peters and Brussel Zuid-Bruxelles Midi (along the E40). De Lijn runs trams in Ghent, Antwerp with the Antwerp Pre-metro and also the coastal tram Kusttram.

== Water ==
=== Ports and harbours ===
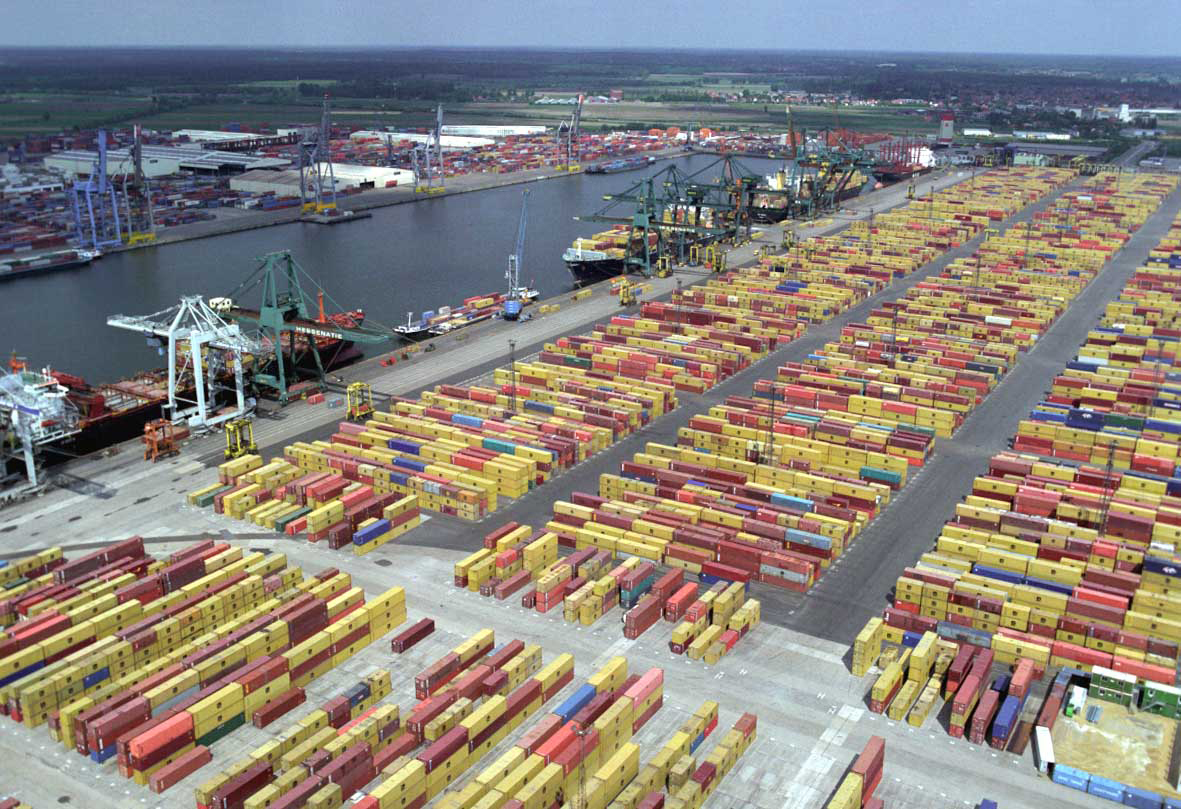
The Port of Antwerp is one of the largest in Europe and the world

==== Sea ports ====
- Antwerp - Port of Antwerp (one of the world's busiest ports)
- Bruges (Zeebrugge) - Port of Bruges-Zeebrugge (one of the busiest in Europe)
- Ghent - Port of Ghent
- Ostend - Port of Ostend

==== Lighthouse ====
- Lange Nelle Lighthouse in the Port of Ostend

==== Former ferries that accepted foot passengers ====
Regie voor Maritiem Transport was a national company that closed in 1997, which ran ferries to Dover Western Docks from Oostende.
