= Jabbeke railway station =

Railway station in Belgium

Jabbeke
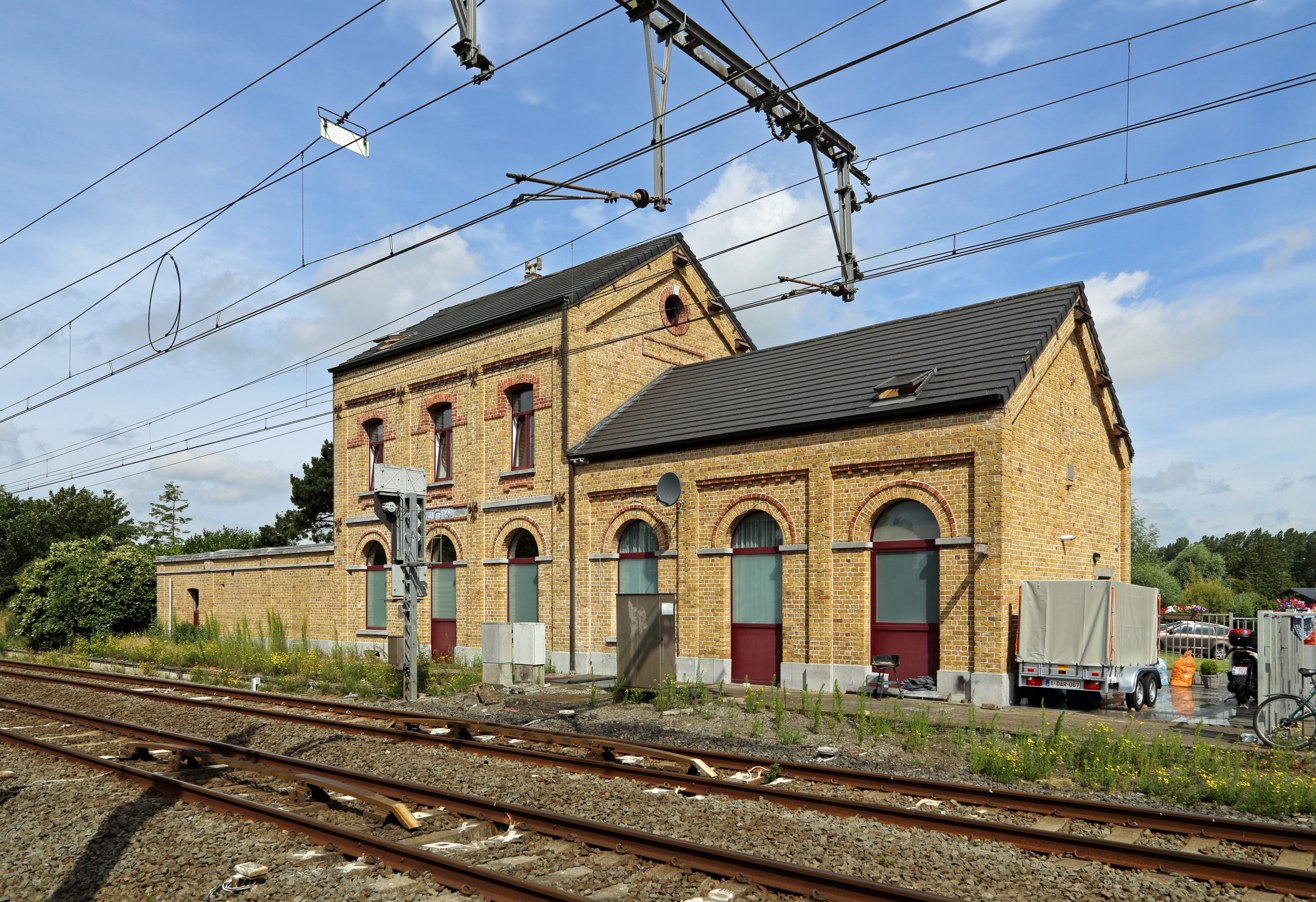
- The former station building in 2015

General information
- Location: Stationsstraat, 8490 Jabbeke; Jabbeke; Belgium
- Coordinates: 51°12′00″N 3°05′24″E
- Line: Belgian railway line 50A

Construction
- Architectural style: 1881 Station Pattern (Belgian)

Other information
- Status: closed

History
- Opened: 18 August 1838
- Closed: 3 June 1984
- Rebuilt: 1875, 1892-1894
Location

Jabbeke railway station is a former Belgian railway station on Line 50A from Brussels to Ostend located in Jabbeke, in the commune of the same name, in the Flemish Region of the province of West Flanders.

The station was opened in 1838 by Belgian State Railways and was closed to traffic in 1984.

== Railway location ==
Until it was closed in 1984, Jabbeke railway station was located at kilometer point (PK) 101.81 of Line 50A, from Brussels to Ostend, between the stations located at Varsenare and Ouden, both also closed.

== History ==
The station was opened on 18 August 1838 by the Belgian State Railways. It was, with Plassendaele (Oudenburg), the only stop between Bruges and Ostend.

At first only a railway stop, administered from Bruges in 1848, then becoming a station in its own right with a revenue-collecting building. A first building on the site, of an unknown appearance, operated from 1875 before being replaced by the current structure, erected between 1892 and 1894.

It is built to the 1881 railway station plan with a wing of three bays on the left.

The SNCB, arguing a decline in passenger traffic, decided to close all stations along Line 50A between Bruges and Ostend; the station closed as part of Plan IC-IR, on 3 June 1984.

After several years of abandonment, the station building was sold and converted into housing.

== Gallery ==
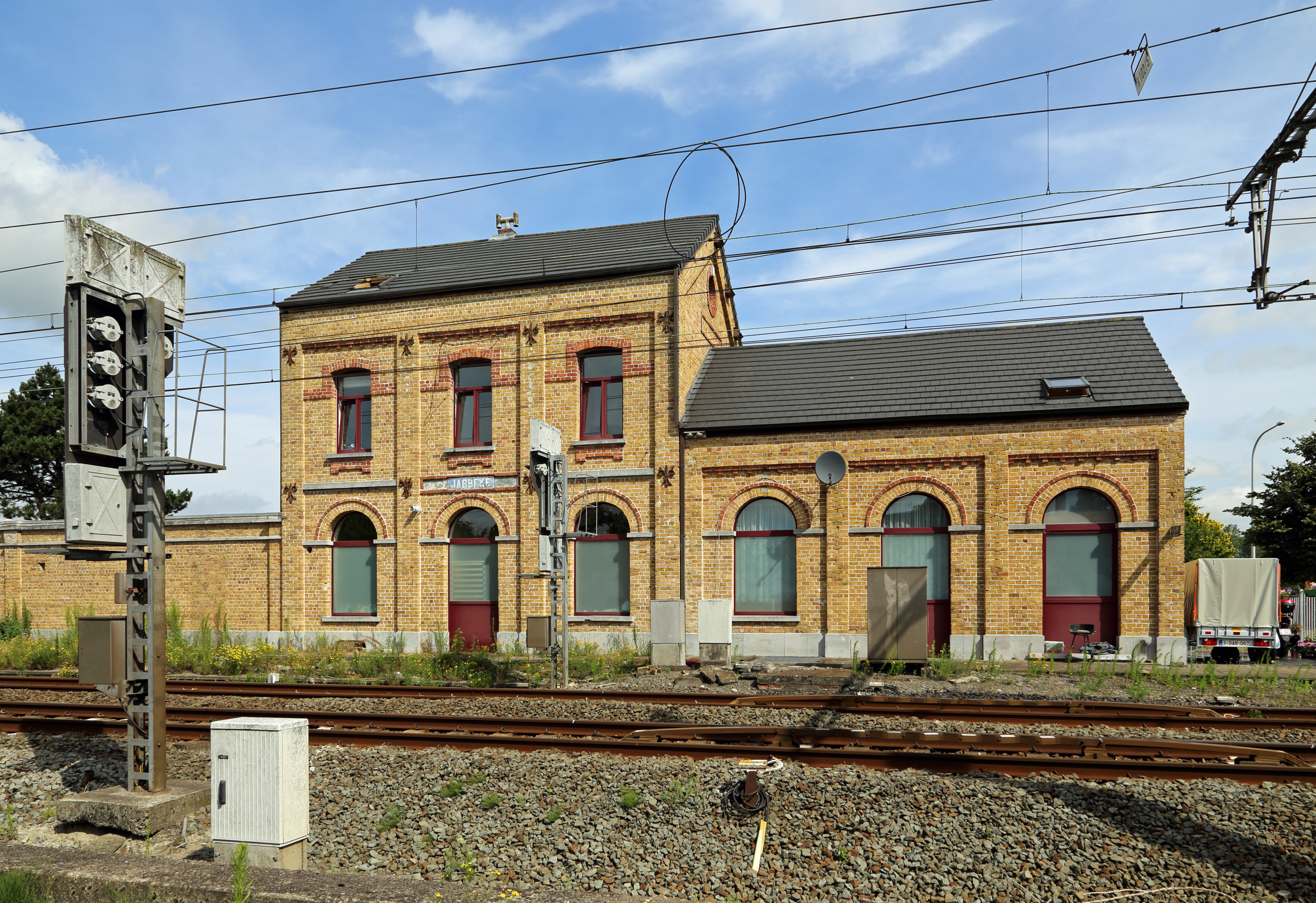
Station building

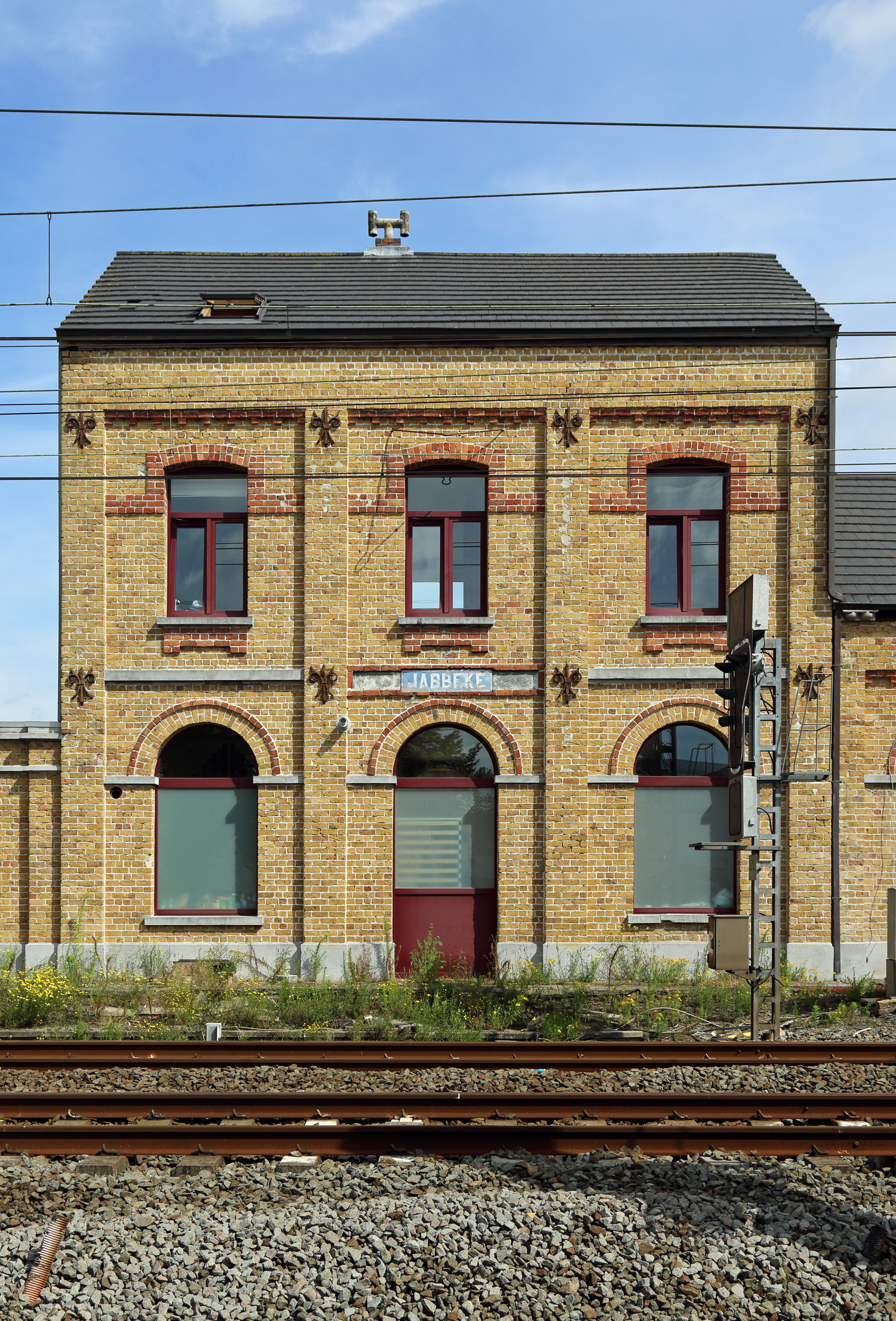
Main building

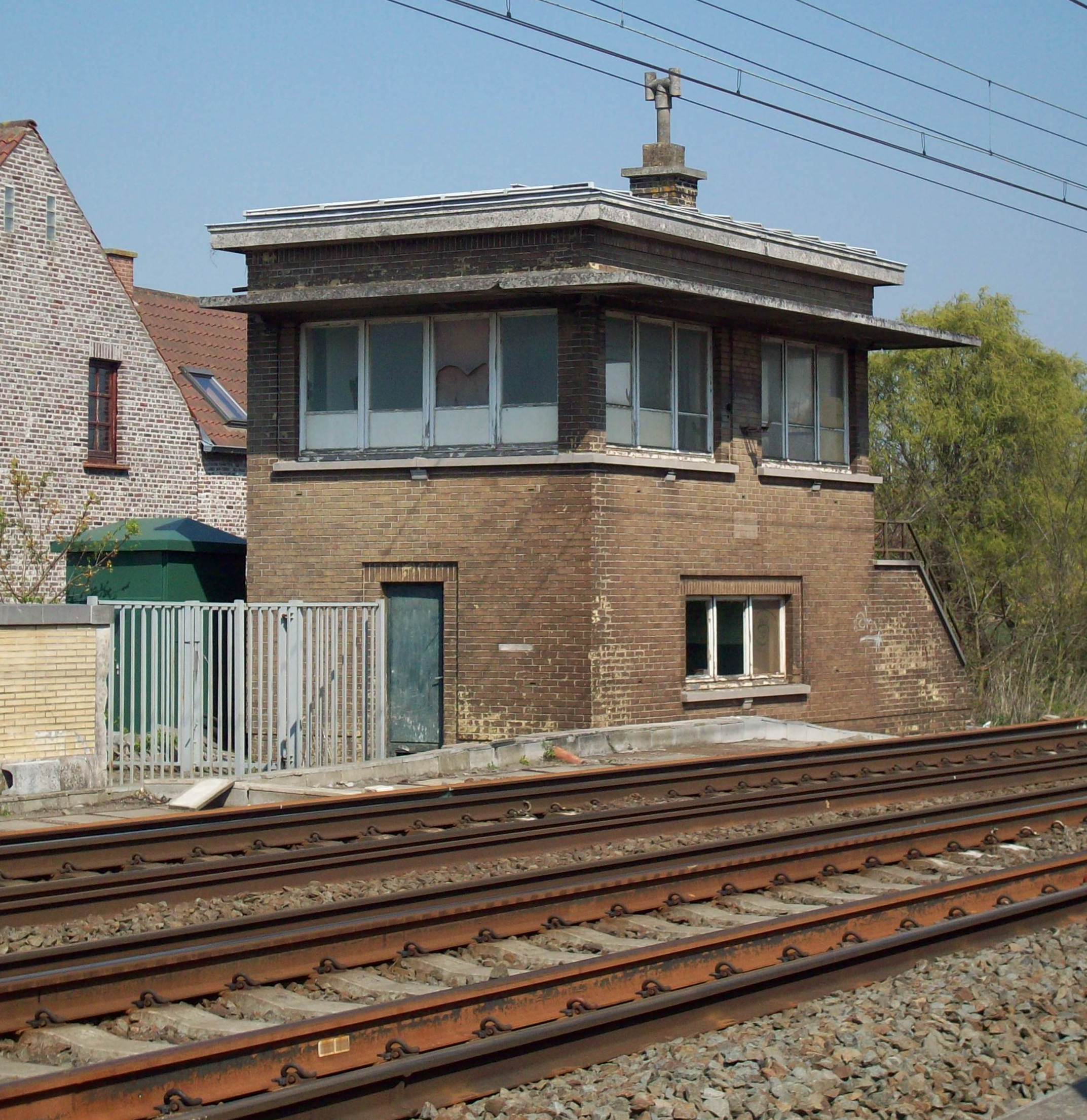
Former signal box.
