= Oostende railway station =

Railway station in West Flanders, Belgium

Oostende
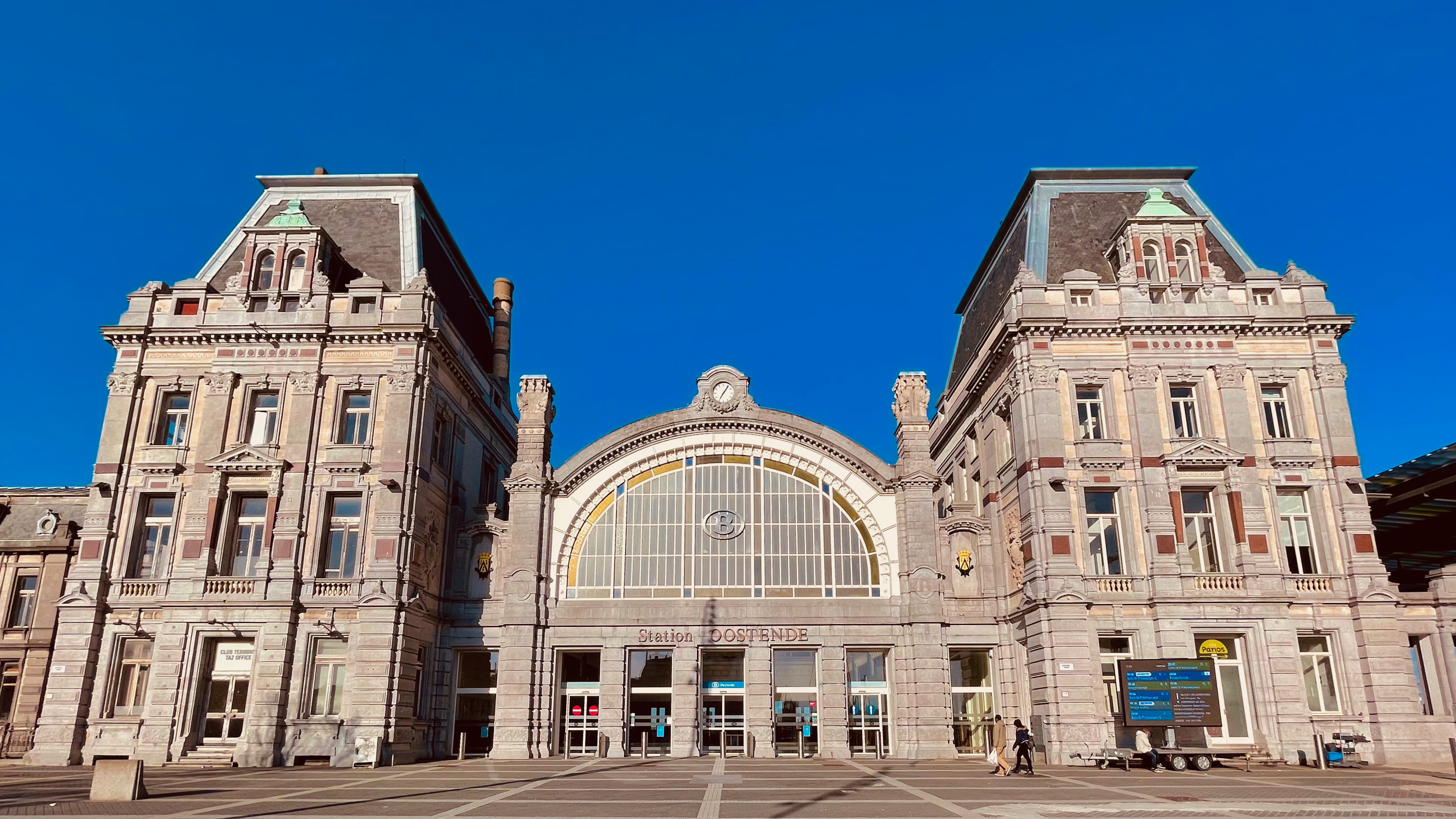
- Oostende railway station

General information
- Location: Natiënkaai, 8400 Ostend; Belgium
- Coordinates: 51°13′44″N 2°55′33″E
- System: Railway Station
- Owner: NMBS/SNCB
- Operator: NMBS/SNCB
- Lines: 50A, Kusttram
- Platforms: 5
- Tracks: 8

Other information
- IATA code: ZGJ

History
- Opened: 1838; 188 years ago
- Rebuilt: 1913; 113 years ago
- Electrified: 3 kV DC overhead on NMBS and 600 V DC overhead on the Kusttram.
Location
- Location within Belgium Location within Europe

Oostende railway station (Dutch: Station Oostende; French: Gare d'Ostende) (Note: Officially Oostende (Dutch: Oostende; French: Ostende)) is a railway station in Ostend, West Flanders, Belgium. It is operated by the National Railway Company of Belgium (NMBS/SNCB).

== History ==
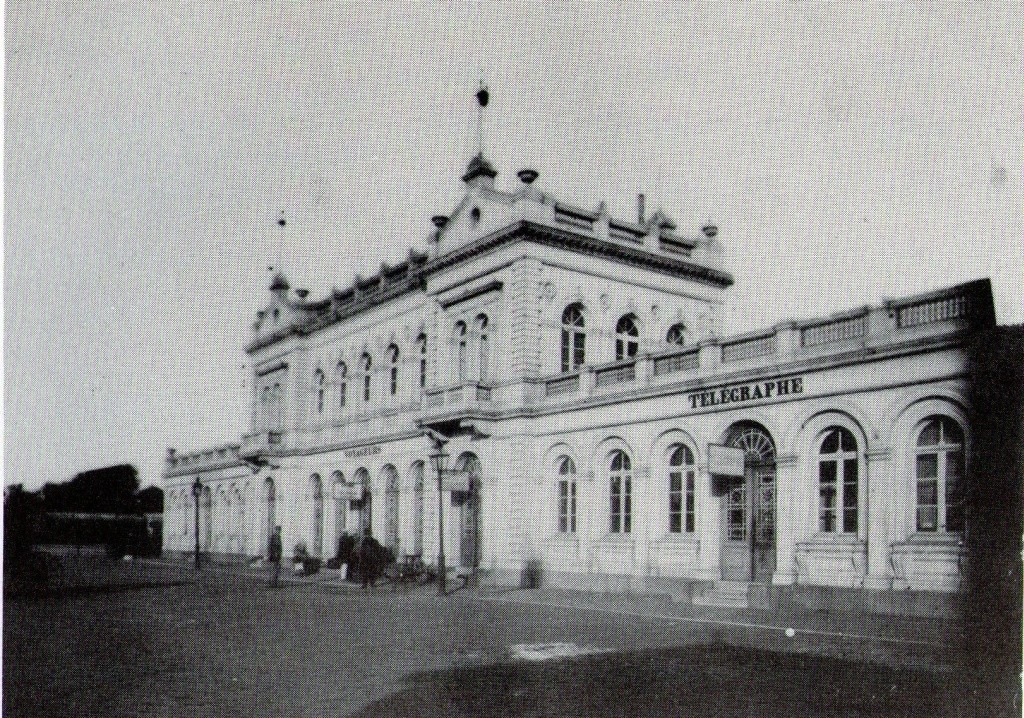
The first Oostende railway station, before its demolition in 1879

The first station in Ostend was opened in 1838 during the reign of King Leopold I on the former Belgian railway line 62 to Torhout and is now a supermarket.

The current station was opened in 1913 during the reign of King Albert I. It is designed to connect trains and ferries and is built with Scottish granite, bluestone from Soignies and limestone from Euville. It is constructed in a neoclassical style inspired by the French 18th-century architect François Mansart and the Louis XVI style.

The station was served by a daily Thalys high-speed rail service to Paris between 1998 and 31 March 2015.

== Train services ==
Oostende railway station is a major hub on the National Railway Company of Belgium (NMBS/SNCB) network with frequent InterCity trains serving Brugge railway station, Gent-Sint-Pieters, Brussels-South and Liège-Guillemins on Belgian railway line 50A. Connecting InterCity trains run to Antwerpen and Kortrijk.

The station is served by the following services:

- Intercity services Ostend - Bruges - Gent - Brussels - Leuven - Liege - Eupen
- Intercity services Ostend - Bruges - Gent - Sint-Niklaas - Antwerpen
- Intercity services Ostend - Bruges - Kortrijk - Zottegem - Brussels - Brussels Airport

Preceding station	NMBS/SNCB	Following station
Terminus	IC 01	Brugge towards Eupen
Terminus	IC 02	Brugge towards Antwerpen-Centraal
Terminus	IC 23	Brugge towards Brussels National Airport
Preceding station	Coast Tram	Following station
Oostende Marie-Joséplein towards De Panne		Oostende Weg naar Vismijn towards Knokke

== Kusttram ==
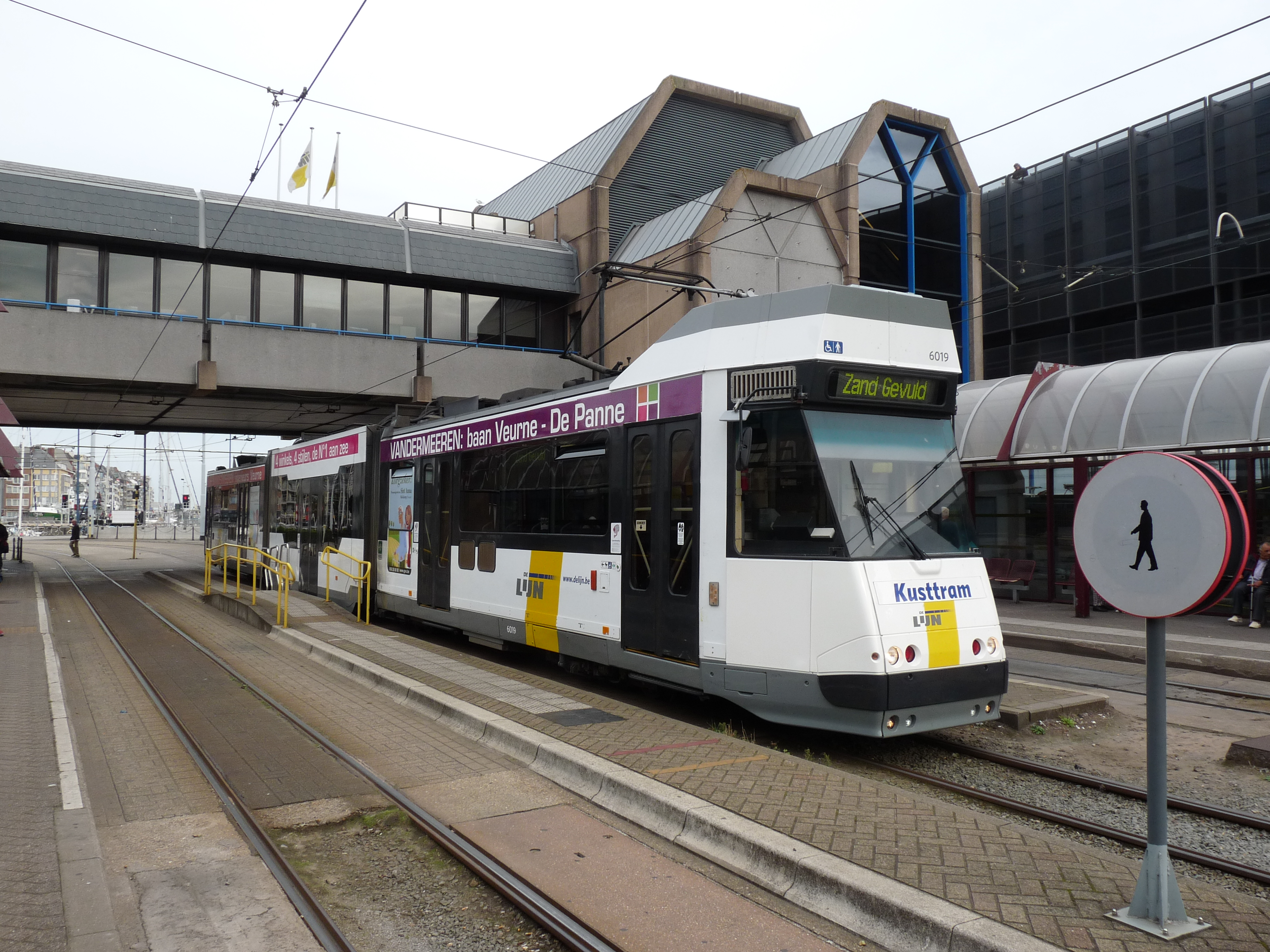
Kusttram run by De Lijn

Ostend is a major hub on the Kusttram, which is the coastal tramway run by De Lijn.

== Former ferries ==
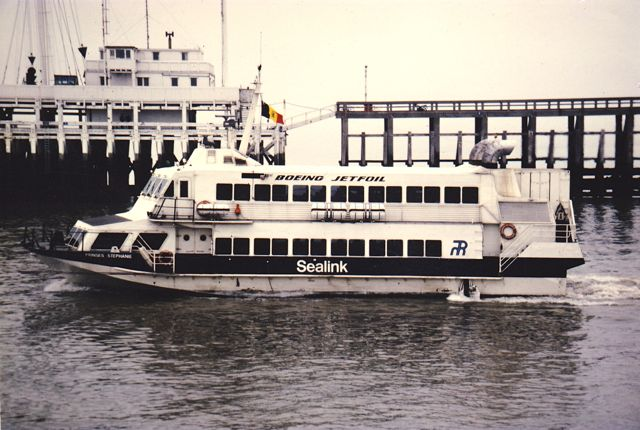
Former Prinses Stephanie Jetfoil in the Port of Ostend approaching the terminal

Regie voor Maritiem Transport used to run services connecting to the Port of Dover connecting with Network SouthEast trains from Dover Western Docks to London Victoria and London Charing Cross stations. These ceased in 1994. In the past, ferries operated to Folkestone Harbour connecting with Folkestone Harbour station boat trains to London Victoria and London Charing Cross.

== Gallery ==
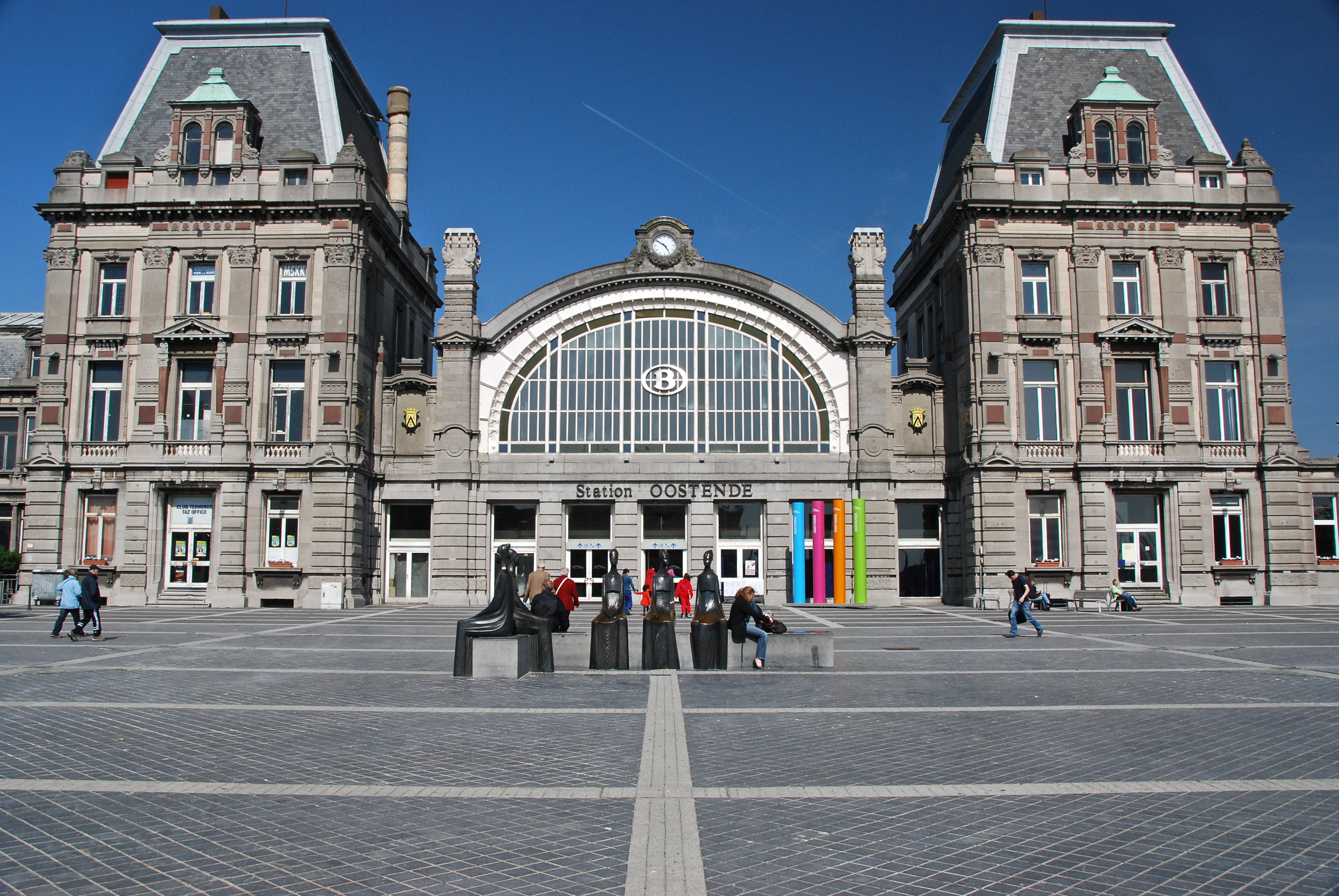
Frontal view

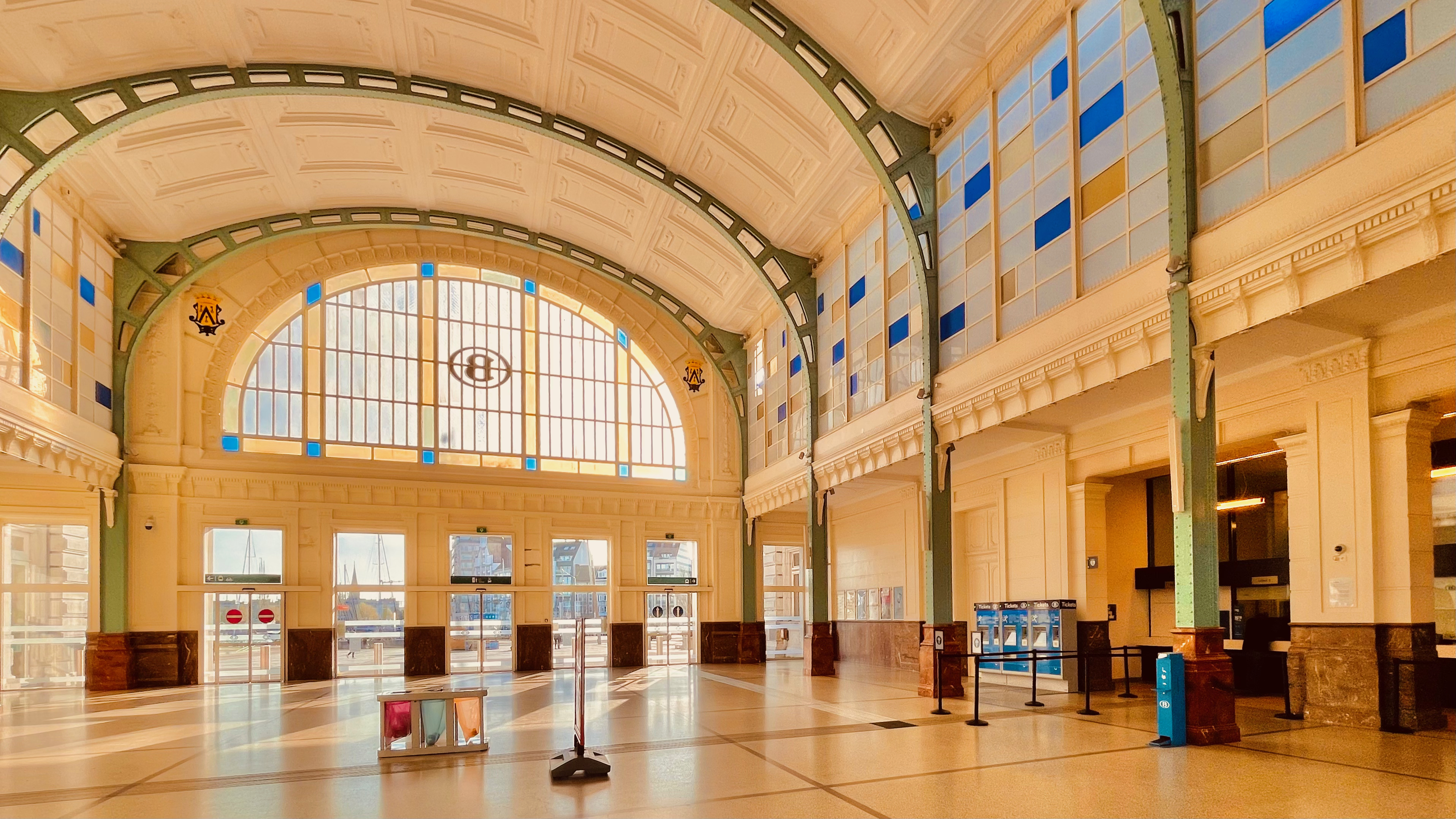
Interior of the station

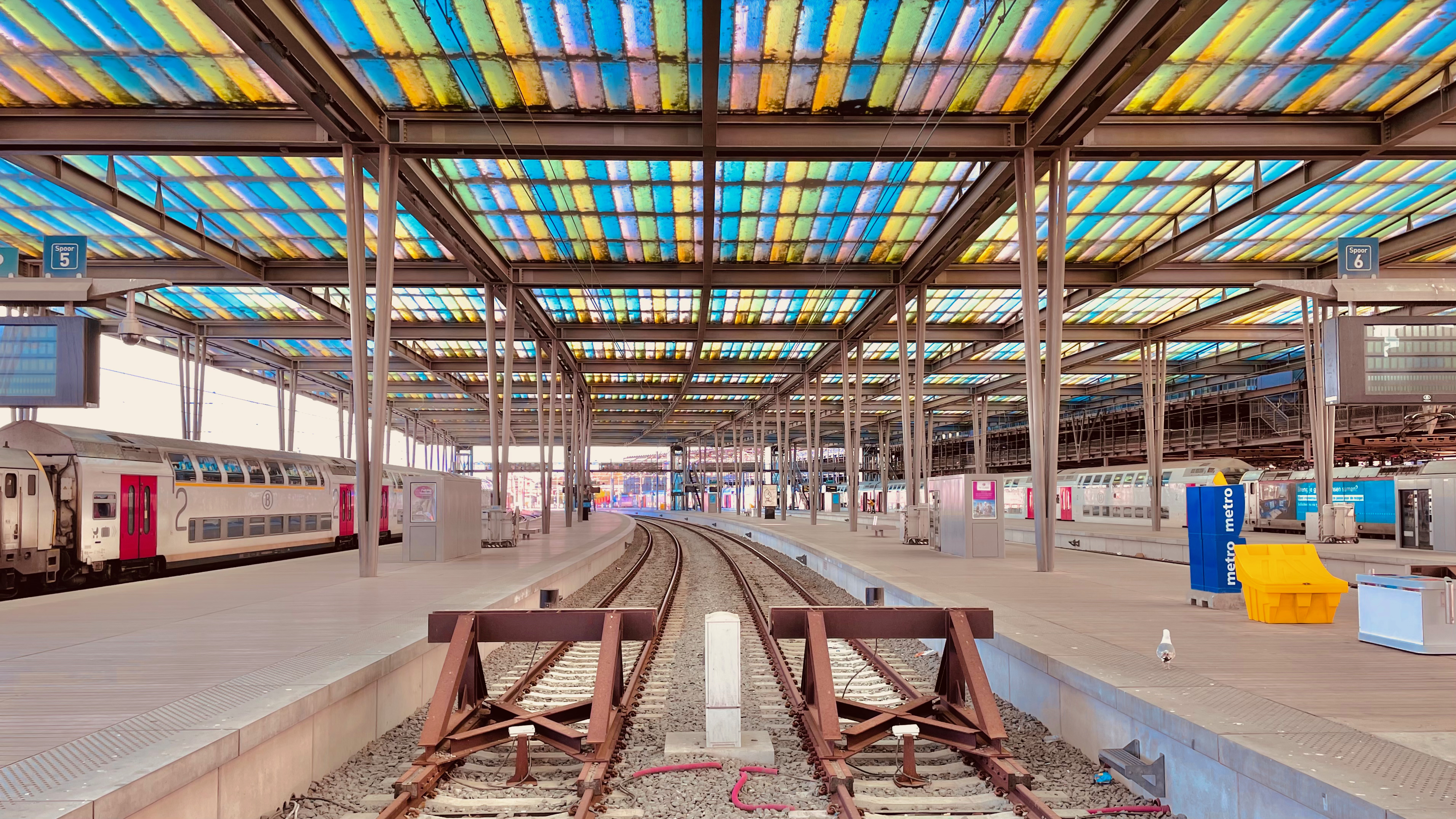
View of the platforms and tracks

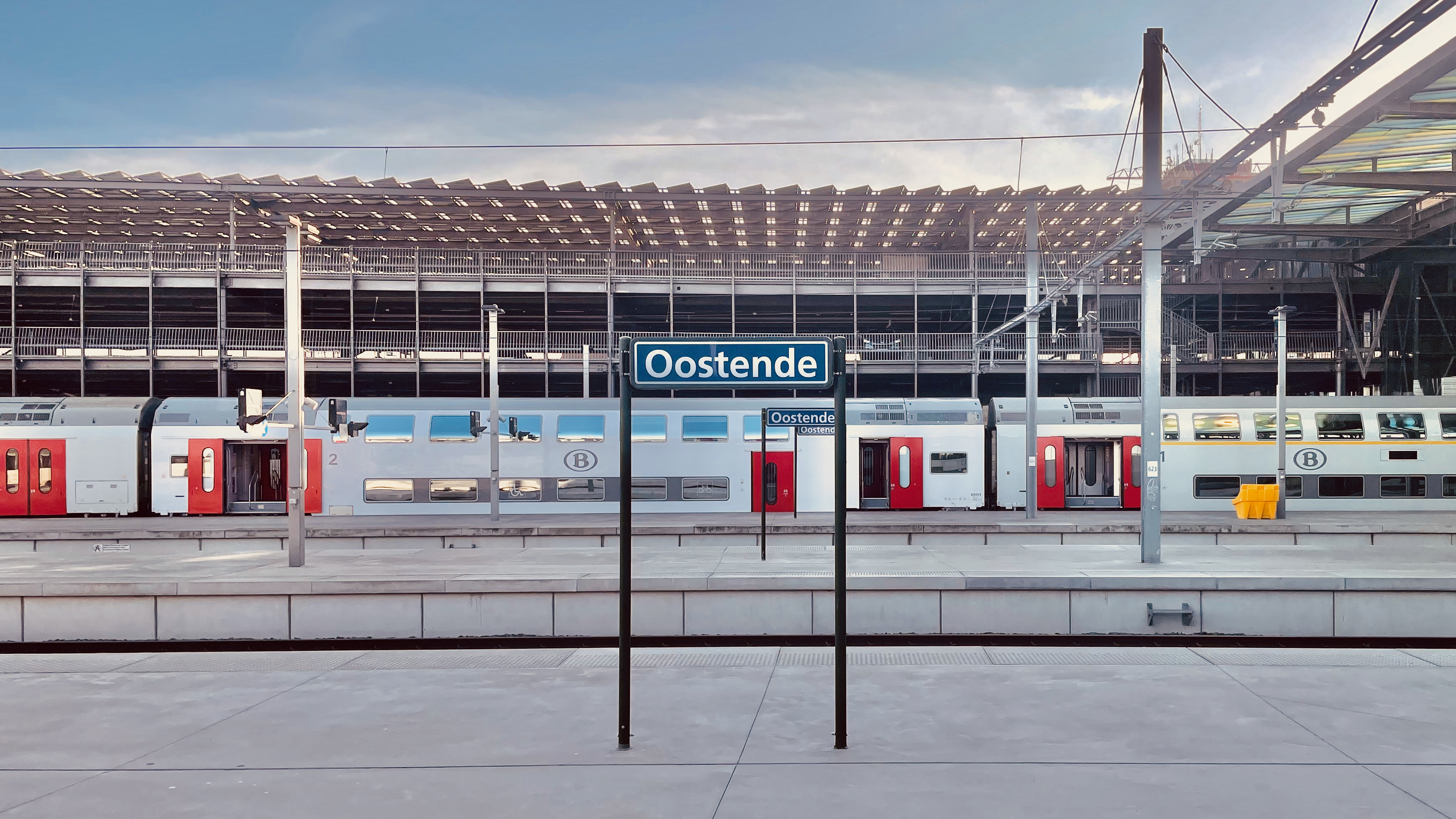
Place name sign on a platform

== See also ==
- List of railway stations in Belgium
- Rail transport in Belgium
