= List of town tramway systems in Belgium =

This is a list of town tramway systems in Belgium by region and province. It tables all tram systems, both past (including vicinal tramways) and present. Cities with currently operating systems, and those systems themselves, are indicated in bold and blue background colored rows. Known tram systems that operated on tracks other than standard gauge are indicated in the 'Notes' column.

== Brussels ==
Name of System	Location	Traction Type	Date (From)	Date (To)	Notes
Trams in Brussels	**Brussels**	Horse	1 May 1869	190_	
Trams in Brussels	**Brussels**	Steam	1876; 1879	1877; 1879	
Trams in Brussels	**Brussels**	Accumulator (storage battery)	1883; 1886	1883; 1890	
Trams in Brussels	**Brussels**	Electric	1 May 1894		

== Flanders ==
=== Antwerp Province ===
Name of System	Location	Traction Type	Date (From)	Date (To)	Notes
Antwerp tramway	**Antwerp**	Horse	25 May 1873	?	Gauge: 1,000 mm (3 ft 3 3/8 in)
Antwerp tramway	**Antwerp**	Electric	2 Sep 1902		Gauge: 1,000 mm (3 ft 3 3/8 in)
	Mechelen	Electric	1913	30 Apr 1957	Reintroduction discussed

=== East Flanders ===
Name of System	Location	Traction Type	Date (From)	Date (To)	Notes
Trams in Ghent	**Ghent**	Horse	24 May 1874	?	
Trams in Ghent	**Ghent**	Accumulator (storage battery)	23 Jan 1899	?	
Trams in Ghent	**Ghent**	Electric	1 Dec 1901		Gauge: 1,000 mm (3 ft 3 3/8 in)

=== Flemish Brabant ===
Name of System	Location	Traction Type	Date (From)	Date (To)	Notes
	Leuven	Horse	?	?	
	Leuven	Electric	?	15 Aug 1952	Gauge: 1,000 mm (3 ft 3 3/8 in); Reintroduction discussed

=== Limburg ===
Name of System	Location	Traction Type	Date (From)	Date (To)	Notes
	Hasselt – Genk	Steam	?	?	
	Hasselt – Genk	Electric	?	31 Jan 1958	

=== West Flanders ===
Name of System	Location	Traction Type	Date (From)	Date (To)	Notes
Coast Tram (Belgium) (Kustlijn – i.e. Coast Line: Adinkerke – De Panne – Oostende – Knokke)	**Belgian coast**	Steam	15 Jul 1885	1955	
Coast Tram (Belgium) (Kustlijn – i.e. Coast Line: Adinkerke – De Panne – Oostende – Knokke)	**Belgian coast**	Electric	1 Oct 1908		Gauge: 1,000 mm (3 ft 3 3/8 in)
	Brugge (Bruges)	Electric	1913	1951	Gauge: 1,000 mm (3 ft 3 3/8 in); Reintroduction discussed: see Coast Tram (Belgium) (Kustlijn).
	De Panne	Horse	?	?	
	De Panne	Petrol	?	?	
	De Panne	Electric	?	?	See also: Coast Tram (Belgium) (Kustlijn).
	Knokke – Urban	Horse	?	?	
	Knokke – Urban	Electric	?	1951	See also: Coast Tram (Belgium) (Kustlijn).
	Koksijde	Horse	?	?	See also: Coast Tram (Belgium) (Kustlijn).
	Kortrijk	Steam	?	?	
	Kortrijk	Electric	?	25 Mar 1963	
	Nieuwpoort – Oostduinkerke	Steam	?	?	
	Nieuwpoort – Oostduinkerke	Electric	?	?	See also: Coast Tram (Belgium) (Kustlijn).
	Oostende /Ostend urban	Steam	?	?	
	Oostende /Ostend urban	Accumulator (storage battery)	?	?	
	Oostende /Ostend urban	Electric	?	1 Jul 1958	
	Tielt	Horse	?	?	

== Wallonia ==
=== Hainaut ===
Name of System	Location	Traction Type	Date (From)	Date (To)	Notes
Trams in Charleroi	**Charleroi**	Steam	1881	?	
Trams in Charleroi	**Charleroi**	Electric	4 Jul 1904	29 Jun 1974	Gauge: 1,000 mm (3 ft 3 3/8 in); **Converted to light rail** (see: MLC).
Métro Léger de Charleroi (MLC)	**Charleroi**	Electric	21 Jun 1976		**Light rail**. Gauge: 1,000 mm (3 ft 3 3/8 in); See also: List of former MLC lines.
	La Louvière	Steam	?	?	
	La Louvière	Electric	?	August 1993	
	Vicinal	Steam	3 Jun 1887	?	
	Vicinal	Electric	28 Mar 1901		Interurban tramway system. First grade separated segment (i.e. LRT) opened om 21 June 1976.
	Mons	Steam	?	?	
	Mons	Petrol	?	?	
	Mons	Electric	?	3 Jun 1973	
	Péruwelz	Horse	?	?	
	Tournai	Electric	?	21 May 1955	

=== Liège Province ===
Name of System	Location	Traction Type	Date (From)	Date (To)	Notes
	Eupen	Electric	?	30 Jul 1956	
Trams in Liège	Liège	Horse	20 Nov 1871	?	
Trams in Liège	Liège	Electric	22 Oct 1896	23 Dec 1961	Gauge: 1,000 mm (3 ft 3 3/8 in)
Trams in Liège	Liège	Electric	28 Apr 2025		Light rail
	Liège – Seraing	Horse	?	?	
	Liège – Seraing	Steam	?	?	
	Liège – Seraing	Electric	?	30 Apr 1968	
	Verviers	Horse	?	?	
	Verviers	Electric	1900(?)	31 Dec 1969	Gauge: 1,000 mm (3 ft 3 3/8 in)

=== Namur ===
Name of System	Location	Traction Type	Date (From)	Date (To)	Notes
Trams in Han-sur-Lesse	**Han-sur-Lesse**	Diesel	1906	(?)	Gauge: 1,000 mm (3 ft 3 3/8 in); Tourist historic cars (Caves of Han-sur-Lesse).
Trams in Han-sur-Lesse	**Han-sur-Lesse**	Electric	2014	2025	Gauge: 1,000 mm (3 ft 3 3/8 in); Tourist historic cars (Caves of Han-sur-Lesse).
Trams in Namur	Namur	Electric	?	26 May 1963	

== See also ==
- Brussels Intercommunal Transport Company (STIB/MIVB)
- Flemish Transport Company "De Lijn"
- List of metro systems
- List of town tramway systems in Europe
- List of tram and light rail transit systems
- List of trolleybus systems
- Opérateur de transport de Wallonie
