= Trams in Ghent =

Belgium transportation system

Ghent tramway network
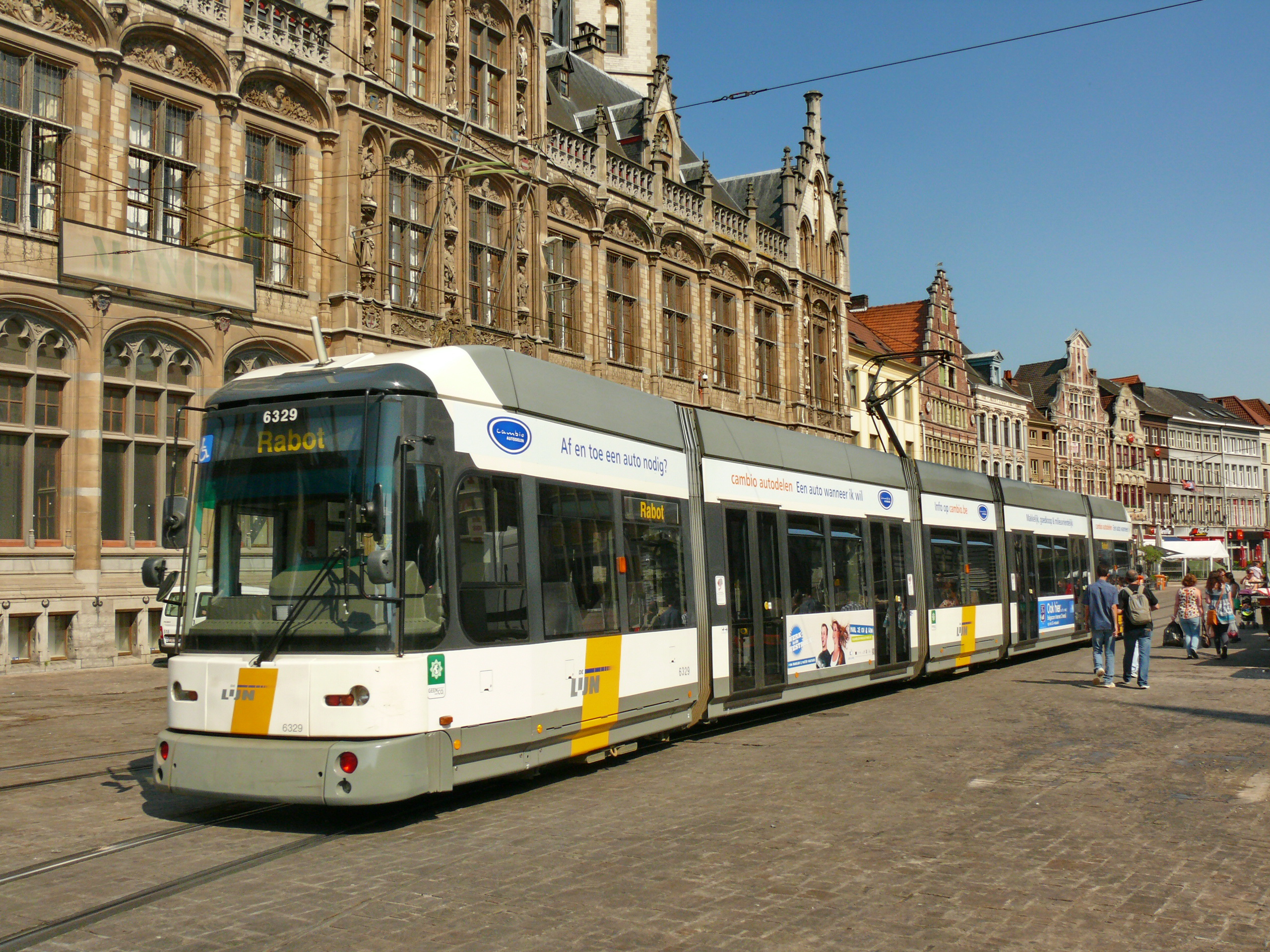
- A HermeLijn tram in the Korenmarkt, 2012.

Operation
- Locale: Ghent, Belgium

Statistics
Horsecar era: 1874–ca. 1904
- Status: Converted to electricity
- Operators: Les Tramways de la Ville de Gand (1874–1897); Société Anonyme des Railways Éonomiques de Liège-Seraing et Extensions (RELSE); Compagnie Générale des Railways à voie étroite (CGR) (1897); SA des Tramways Electriques de Gand (1898–ca. 1904)
- Track gauge: 1,435 mm (4 ft 8 1/2 in) standard gauge
- Propulsion system: Horses
Accumulator tram era: 1899–ca. 1904
- Status: Experiments abandoned
- Operator: SA des Tramways Electriques de Gand
- Track gauge: 1,435 mm (4 ft 8 1/2 in)
- Propulsion system: Rechargeable batteries
Electric tram era: since 1904
- Status: Operational
- Operators: SA des Tramways Electriques de Gand (1904–1961); Maatschappij voor Intercommunaal vervoer te Gent (MIVG) (1961–1991); De Lijn (since 1991)
- Track gauge: 1,000 mm (3 ft 3 3/8 in) metre gauge
- Propulsion system: Electricity
- Electrification: 600 V DC Overhead
- Depot: Gentbrugge
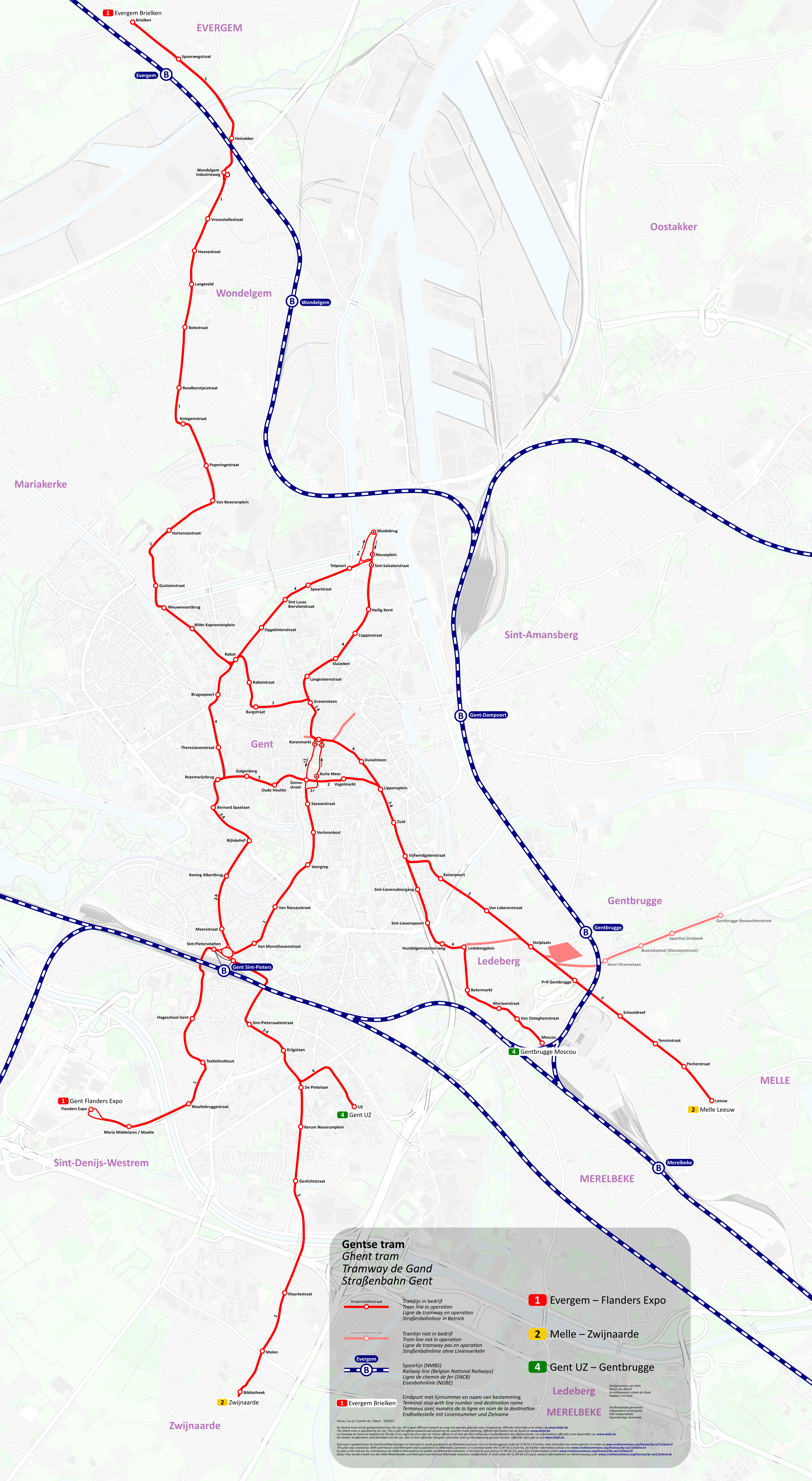
- Ghent tramway network
- Website: De Lijn (in English)

The Ghent tramway network (Dutch: de Gentse tram) is a network of tramways forming part of the public transport system in Ghent, a city in the Flemish Region of Belgium, with a total of four lines (T1, T2, T3 and T4). Since 1991, the network has been operated by De Lijn, the public transport entity responsible for buses and trams in Flanders.

The network is being operated with HermeLijn trams and Bombardier Flexity 2 trams.

== General description ==
The network covers approximately 30 kilometres (19 mi) . The track gauge is 1,000 mm (3 ft 3 3/8 in) metre gauge and trams are powered by 600 V DC overhead wires. The network uses dedicated rights of way as well as mixed traffic; the right of way on Groot-Britanniëlaan is shared with buses.

The system used to have one short tunnel, around 150 meters (160 yd) long, passing underneath Sint-Pieters railway station. The Sint-Pieters Station tram stop was located inside the tunnel. It was opened on June 28, 1996.

The system has no triangles and only a single turnback loop. Therefore, all rolling stock must be bidirectional, with cabs at each end. There are also two non-switch 90-degree crossings, on the crossing of Zonnestraat with Veldstraat as well on the crossing of Zonnestraat with Korte Meer.

On streets where tram tracks are located away from the sidewalk, i.e. in the middle of the roadway, stops are located on islands with pedestrian overpasses leading to them. This improves pedestrian safety.

== History ==
=== Overview ===
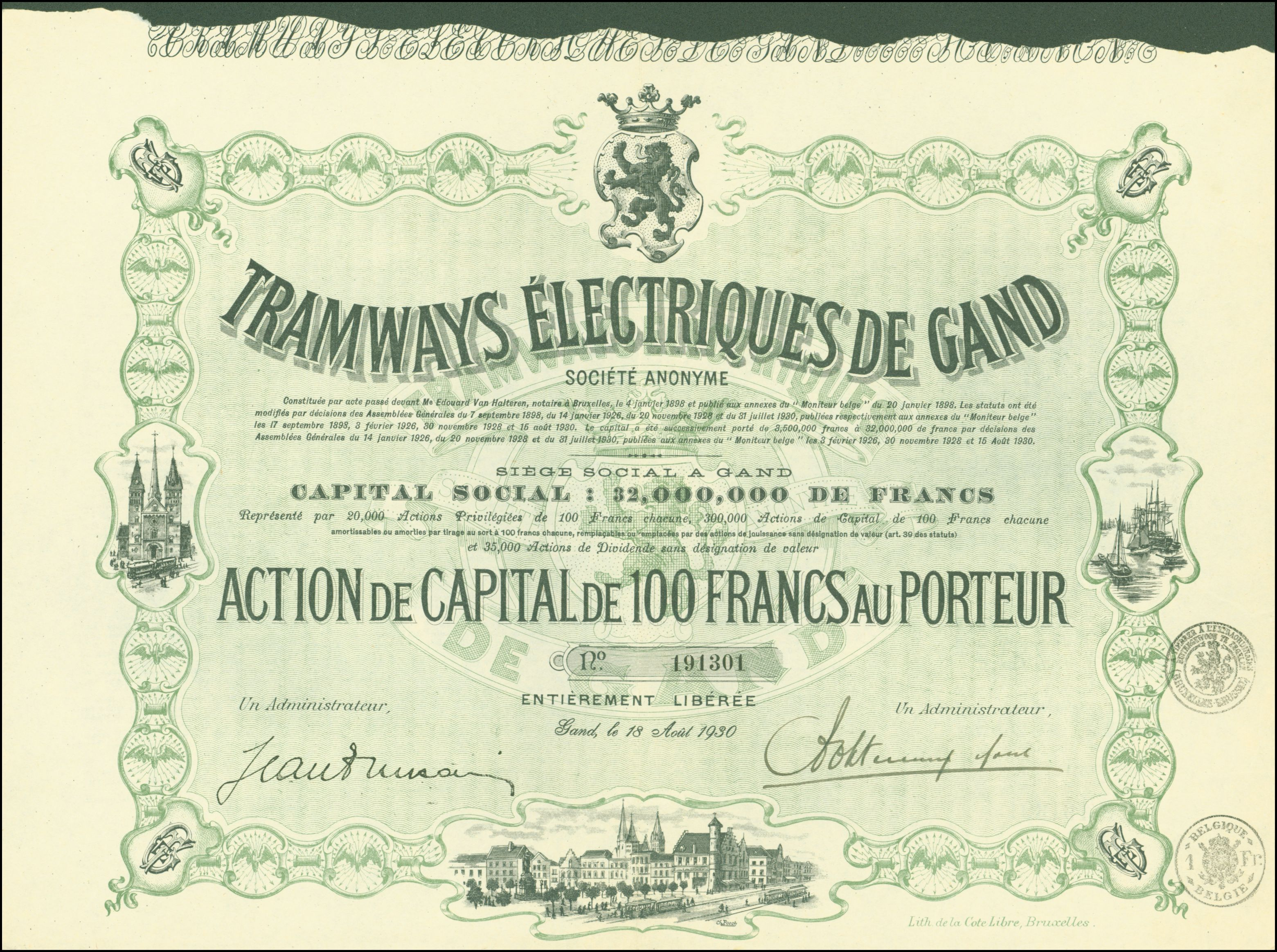
Share of the Société Anonyme des Tramways Electriques de Gand, issued 18. August 1930

Horse-drawn trams appeared in Ghent in 1874. The rolling stock consisted of 43 carriages, 14 of them open and the other 29 closed, with 100 horses used to draw them. The horse-drawn trams were operated by Les Tramways de la Ville de Gand, which existed until 1897.

On August 13 of 1897 operating concessions were issued to the Société Anonyme des Railways Économiques de Liège-Seraing et Extensions (RELSE) and the Compagnie Générale des Railways à voie étroite (CGR). These companies merged on January 4, 1898, to form the SA des Tramways Electriques de Gand. The aim of this move was to replace horses by electric traction, as well as the further usage of the tram network. It was also decided to use battery-powered trams, since they did not require unsightly overhead lines.

The power of battery operated trams was 25 hp (19 kW). Each tram carried 45 passengers. The maximum speed of each was 12 km/h (7.5 mph); by law, the operator was not allowed to travel any faster. A special 600 kW (800 hp) generating station was built to charge the batteries of these trams.

However, battery traction was operationally unsuccessful, so in 1903 a decision was made to install overhead electrification. The first trams powered by overhead lines entered service in 1904. This date marks the birth of a tramway in Ghent. From 1904 to 1961 the system was operated by "Tramway Electriques de Gand" (TEG).

During the process of electrification, the track gauge was reduced from 1,435 mm (4 ft 8 1/2 in) standard gauge to 1,000 mm (3 ft 3 3/8 in) metre gauge.

=== Late 20th century ===
In the 1960s the tram network of Ghent decreased rapidly, there were eleven routes (1–10, 20) in 1961. By 1974 there were just four; the route to Melle closed on New Year's Eve, 1973.

- In 1961 the tram property was transferred from the TEG Tramway Electriques de Gand to the MIVG (Maatschappij voor Intercommunaal Vervoer te Gent) municipal organization.
- Until 1974 the archaic two/three-axle trams "oude gele tramkes" (old little yellow trams) were used on Ghent's tram network. During their working life, they were rebuilt and refurbished several times.
- Plans for a metro-like light rail network were made in the 1970s but were abandoned.
- In 1989 the trolleybus operated along the former tram route 3. In June 2009, the trolleybus stopped running, and under the Pegasusplan the route will revert to tram operation.
- In 1991, the MIVG tram undertaking became part of De Lijn.
- In the 1990s Ghent's tram system started to expand again. In 1993 route 21 was extended to Melle Leeuw. In 1999, routes 21/22 were extended from Sint-Pieters to Zwijnaardebrug, near the E40 motorway; a further extension to Zwijnaarde-Dorp south of the E40 is under construction and due to open in November 2016, an additional branch to Ghent University Hospital opened in March 2016. The last extension previous to that took place in April 2005 when route 1 was extended to the Flanders Expo complex.
- Starting in 1998, a modernization of the Gent PCC trams took place. This modernization featured a completely new interior, and separate driver's cabs at each end, with air conditioning.

=== Since 2000 ===
- Since 2000, the Ghent tram network started to receive new generation Low Floor tram stock, these trams were named HermeLijn (a pun on the Dutch word for ermine). Prior to this, such trams were supplied in Antwerp. Unlike Antwerp, PCC trams used in Ghent are double-ended. HermeLijn in Ghent, of the first order have serial number 6301 — 6314. In 2005 another order of 17 HermeLijn trams arrived in Ghent (6315 — 6331). Another ten arrived in 2007 (6332 - 6341).
- Between January 2024 and 2028, there are no trams on the main tramway Gent-Sint-Pieters railway station - nl:Veldstraat (Gent) - Korenmarkt to the city centre. Instead, tram route 1 follows the route of tram 3 south of the city centre.

== Future plans ==
Significant expansion of the Ghent tram network is planned up to 2025; the network would expand to 80 km (50 mi) instead of 30 km (19 mi), and six routes instead of three. Route 3 to Mariakerke, closed in 1969, is planned to reopen in the 2010s under De Lijn's Pegasusplan. Plans are also afoot for a tramline connecting Gent Sint-Pieters and Gent-Dampoort railway stations (route 7). The plan also includes increased frequencies (eight trams per hour), additional bus services and a Park & Ride system. In 2014 the extension works started for tram lines 21 and 22 to the centre of Zwijnaarde and for tram line 4 to Ghent University Hospital. The latter opened on 13 March 2016. The extension to the centre of Zwijnaarde followed on 6 November 2016.

As of April 2024, only the expansion of tramway 4 from Gent Neuseplein to Gent Dampoort is planned, with the start of the extension works expected in 2025. This will add 1.5 km (0.93 mi) of tracks and 3 new tram stops. The conversion of a part of busline 10 and 11 (the former busline 3) into a tramroute is postponed until further notice, while some part of the tracks have already been laid in the city centre, between the Sint-Michielshelling and Sint-Jacobs. This is due tramroute T7 getting a higher priority, which is a new line between Sint-Denijs-Westrem and Gent Dampoort, adding 7 km (4.3 mi) of new tracks and 3 km (1.9 mi) of shared tracks with T1. The start of this project is expected around 2028.

Both the extension of T4 and the new tramline T7 are part of the Gentspoort project, a big mobility project around Ghent expected to start in 2027, consisting of 6 separate projects.

== Routes ==
Routes overlap each other in some places. As of 6 January 2024, there are four routes in Ghent: Numbers 1, 2, 3 and 4. Every route has its own color; this color is depicted in a vehicle's destination sign, as well as on maps and schematics.

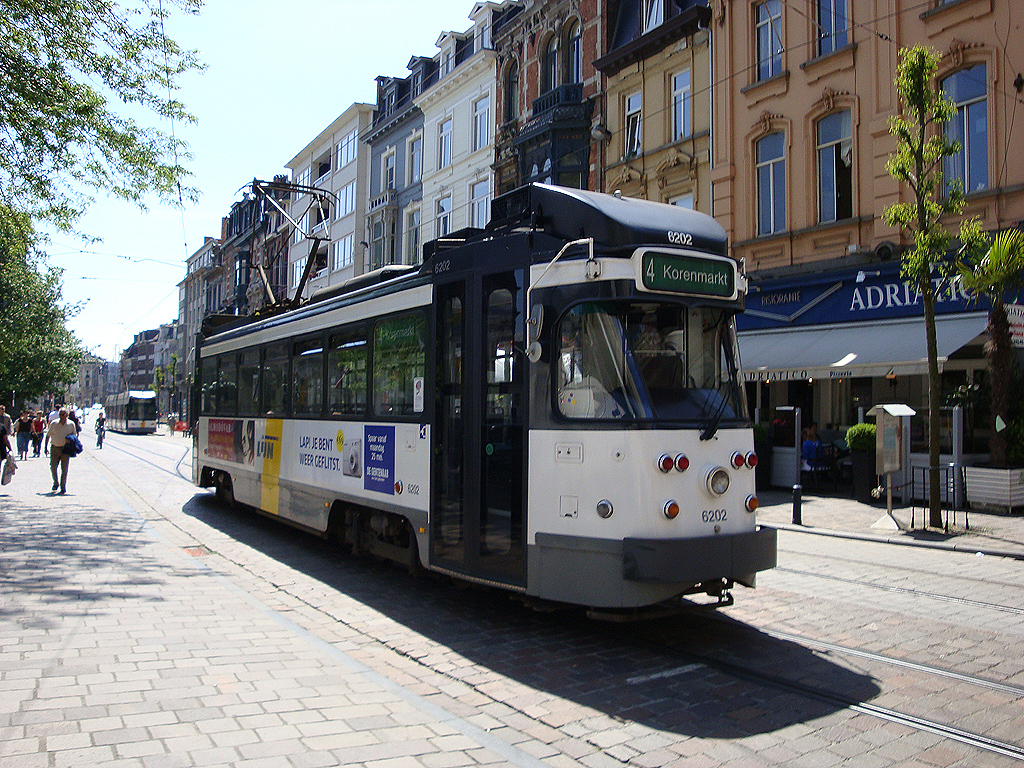
A Euro PCC tram operating route 4.

Line	Route
T1	Flanders Expo – Gent-Sint-Pieters railway station – Kouter – Zuid – Gentbrugge Stelplaats
T2	Van Beverenplein;– Korenmarkt – Zuid – Melle Leeuw
T3	Zwijnaarde Bibliotheek – Gent-Sint-Pieters railway station – Kouter – Zuid – Moscou
T4	Gent UZ – Gent-Sint-Pieters railway station – Rabot – Muide – Lange Steenstraat

Some services follow a truncated route. Until 2004 they had their own numbers. For example, 11 and 12 were shortened versions of routes 1 and 2; the shortened routes along the way of route 4 were known as 41, 42 while route 4 was numbered 40. Nowadays, when a route is shortened, it retains the same number and just shows a different destination on its destination sign.

Additional shortened routes are organized frequently when mass activities such as Gentse Feesten take place in the center of the city. Bidirectional rolling stock makes it easier to organize shortened routes.

While works on the tracks at the Coupure area are being done, tramline T4 will only serve 4 stops from Sint-Pieters Station to Ghent's University Hospital. Normal service should resume around summer 2024. The current routes are expected to last until 2029, when the rebuild between Veldstraat and Kortrijksepoortstraat is finished. This will have an impact on the route of tramline T1.

== Schedule ==
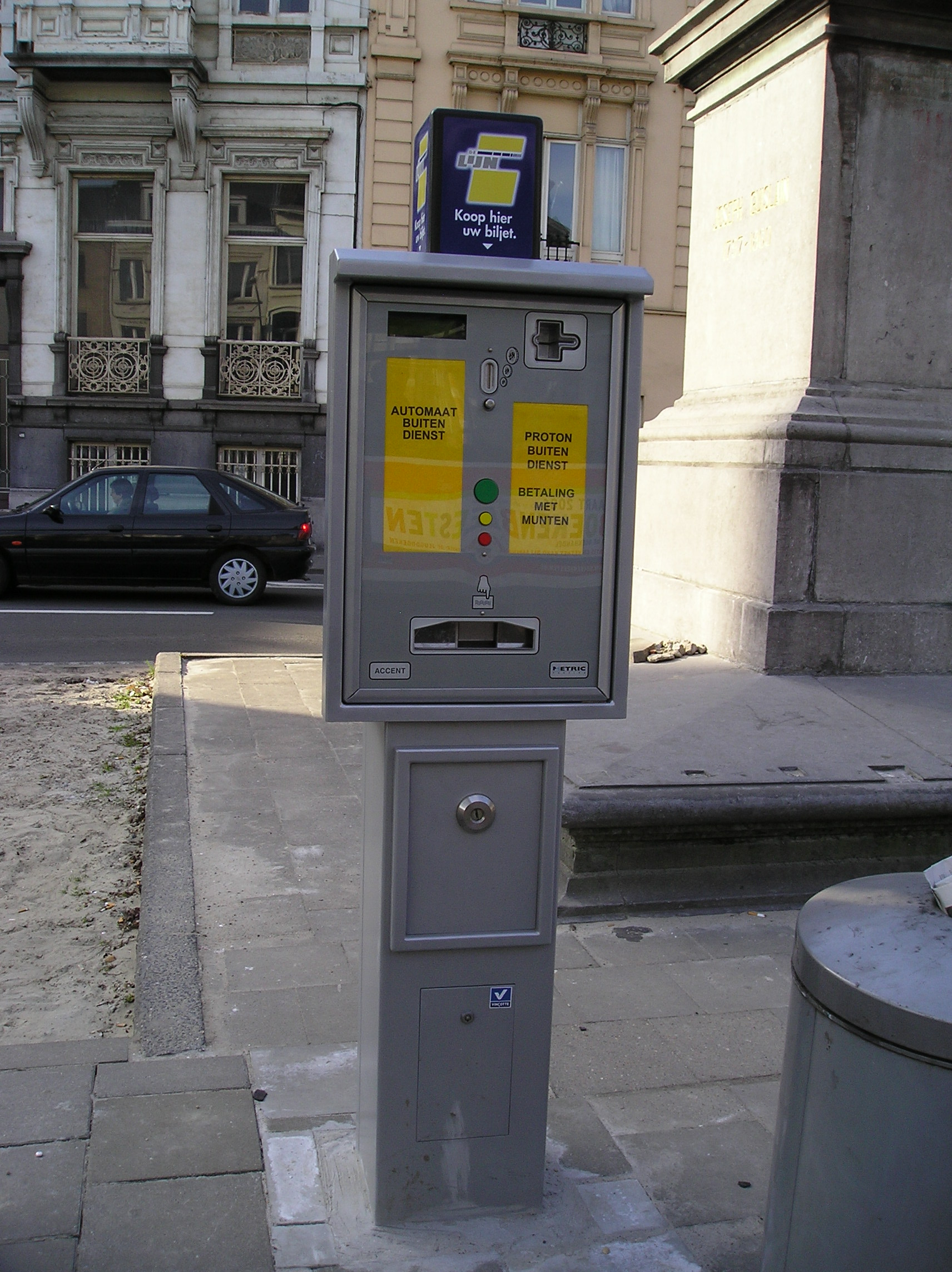
Ticket vending machine on Brugsepoort stop (Route 4). This machine sells only single tickets.

Trams on all of the routes run from approximately 5:30 AM until 01:30 AM on weekdays, until 2:15 AM on Friday and Saturday and until 11:30 PM on Sundays. The interval between trams is between 5 minutes (peak hours) and 20 minutes (off-peak). Each tram stop within the city of Ghent has a timetable.

== Tram stops ==
All stops are request stops, made only on passengers' requests. In order to leave a tram at a given stop, a passenger must push a special button in the tram. This invokes a short sound signal, and a special red indicator lamp is lit in the passenger space, along with a signal lamp on the driver's control panel.

At a stop, when wishing to board, a passenger should raise their hand to request an approaching tram to halt.

== Tickets ==
The Ghent tram is operated by De Lijn (the company which provides transport service in the whole of Flanders); the fare control system is the same as on all public transport in Flanders, and there are no turnstiles. A passenger should stamp a ticket in a validator in the tram (near the doors) at the start of a journey, and every time you take a connection tram or bus after that.

A ticket, which allows an hour's travel over most of the city, costs €3 as of August 2025. Tickets are sold by vending machines at many tram stops, and at special "Lijnwinkel" kiosks (which also sell monthly and weekly passes). Tickets can also be bought online or on board the tram with a contactless payment card. It is no longer possible to purchase a ticket from a tram driver. There are no conductors on trams, but sometimes tickets are checked by fare enforcers; travellers without tickets may be fined €107 for a first time offense and up to €400 for a third or more time offense within 12 months. More recently these fare enforcers are oftentimes accompanied by several police officers. They have been granted some extended powers since 2009.

On PCC trams, the front door works only for entry; on newer HermeLijn trams passengers can enter or exit trams using any of the doors.

== Rolling stock ==
=== Historical ===
Archaic two- and three-axle trams, built in the early 20th century, continued in use until the early 1970s. The last of these were withdrawn in 1974.

=== Duewag trams from Bochum ===
By the early 1990s there was a lack of trams due to expansion of the tram network. In order to solve this problem, it was decided to acquire used trams. In 1993 a PCC tram from Saint-Etienne (France) arrived in Ghent, board number STAS 507. Its stay in Ghent was not successful and saw little use. The tram car was eventually scrapped.

In 1994 it was decided to buy used Duewag trams from Bochum (Germany). The first of them entered Ghent on May 11, 1994. Here it got its board number 55. By September 1 of that year, the usage of this tram started, and on September 19, 1994, it was renumbered no. 60.

Nine ex-Bochum trams arrived in Ghent. There numbers were 6260 — 6265 and 6267 — 6269 (Bochum numbers 29, 20, 19, 22, 23, 27, 11, 14, 16). Yet their usage in Ghent was only four years, the Bochum trams left service by April 25, 1998, and by October 21, 1998 De Lijn decided to scrap the trams and sell them for scrap metal.

=== PCC ===
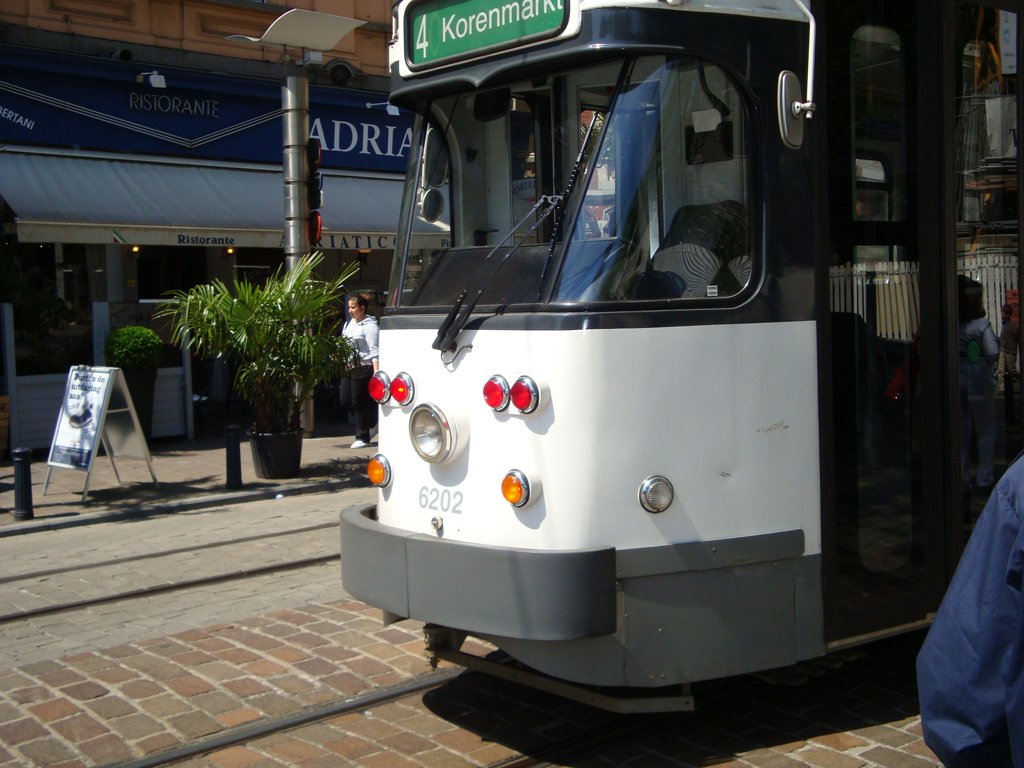
Euro PCC 6202

From 1971 to 1974, 54 PCC trams were delivered to Gent, built at La Brugeoise et Nivelles (BN) in Bruges. Their numbers are 6201 — 6254, but non-modernized PCC trams wear just the last two digits, e.g. 01 rather than 6201.

Tram no. 6201. This tram was recently repaired, yet not modernized. It was brought back to the condition of 1971, and repainted into the original MIVG blue livery, as it was from 1971 to 1991. This tram would be transferred to a museum in 2010, but is still occasionally used in case of shortage.

Tram nos. 6202 — 6223 were modernized in 1998–2003. The interior was completely changed, doors were replaced, and driver's cab were completely separated from passenger's space. It is supposed that those trams will work for 11–14 years more.

Tram nos. 6224 — 6254. A decision was taken not to modernize those trams. Decommissioning began in 2006; as of late 2007 seventeen of the trams were decommissioned. Up to 2010 the usage of non-modernized PCCs is supposed to finish but, as of 31/12/2008, a total of 43 PCC trams remain in service across the whole of East Flanders.

It is likely that these PCCs will continue service for a long time, since there are not enough new trams on order to replace them, especially regarding the planned network expansions.

=== HermeLijn ===
(HermeLijn)

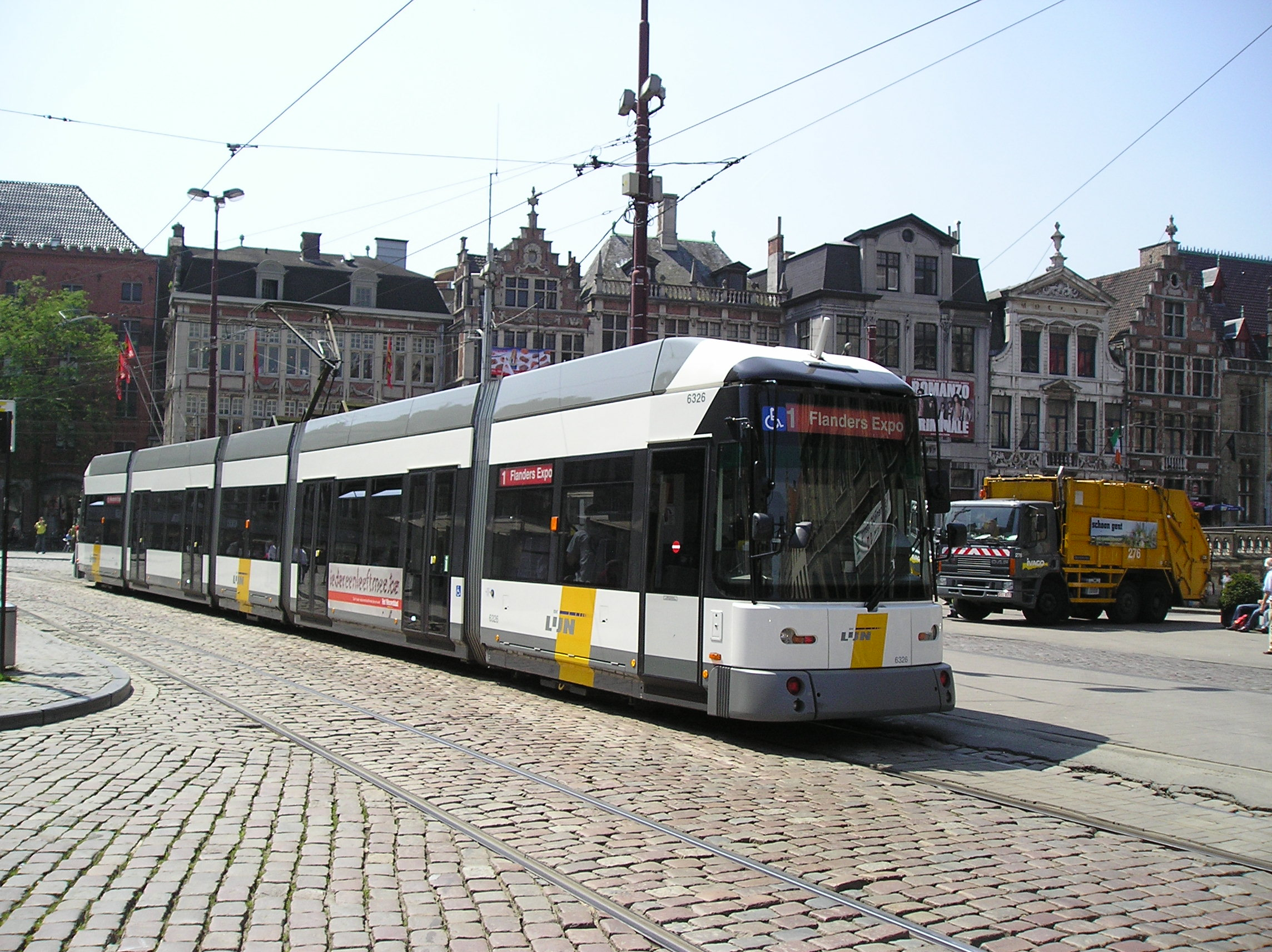
Hermelijn tram in Ghent

These low floor trams (joint enterprise of Siemens and Bombardier) were supplied in Ghent since 1999 till 2007/8. There are three series of HermeLijn in the operating pool: nos. 6301 — 6314, 6315 — 6331 and 6332–6341. HermeLijn trams are in fact a modification of NGT6DD and NGT8DD, which were built for Dresden's tram network from 1995 to 2000 by Deutsche Waggonbau (DWA) in Bautzen.

- Trams 6301 — 6314 were the first low floor trams. They were delivered in 1999–2000.
- Trams 6315 — 6331 were the second series of HermeLijn trams. They were delivered from February 10 to 1 December 2005. They have minor construction differences from the first series, and an automated stop announcement system.
- Trams 6332 - 6341 entered service during 2007. They are used in winter and spring on the Ghent tram network; in summer and autumn they are used on De Kusttram, the Belgian Coast Tram service from Knokke to De Panne.

=== Flexity 2 ===
In August 2012, De Lijn ordered a fleet of Bombardier Flexity 2 trams, which would be allocated to Ghent, Antwerp, and the coast tram; ten of these would be used in Ghent. Since 2015, the new trams started service, mostly on route 1 due to it being the busiest tramline. They are 13m longer than the Hermelijns, which means they can carry up to 1/3rd more passagers. In 2021, the rolling stock contained 26 trams (6351–6376) of this type.

== Depot ==
Currently, the main depot is on Brusselsesteenweg in Gentbrugge, next to the crossing with Steenvoordelaan: 51.03659°N 3.75343°E

This depot is used by trams as well as buses. A new tram depot was planned on a brownfield site at Wissenhage; a new tram and cycle bridge over a canal would connect it to the rest of the network. The bridge has been completed, but the depot has been delayed, partly due to pollution. The new tram yard would have enough space for 80 low floor HermeLijn trams, as well as 175 buses. There would also be repair facilities for trams and buses. The new depot would be located at: 51.06785°N 3.715621°E

The necessity to build a new tram depot arose because the Gentbrugge depot will be too small for the expanding transport system. In the interim, tracks under the E17 highway are being used as a temporary store. This is near the current depot, and also known as "Ghent Brugge-2 depot".

== See also ==
- List of town tramway systems in Belgium
- Trams in Belgium
