= Coast Tram =

Belgian public transport service

Coordinates: 51.26495°N 3.00544°E

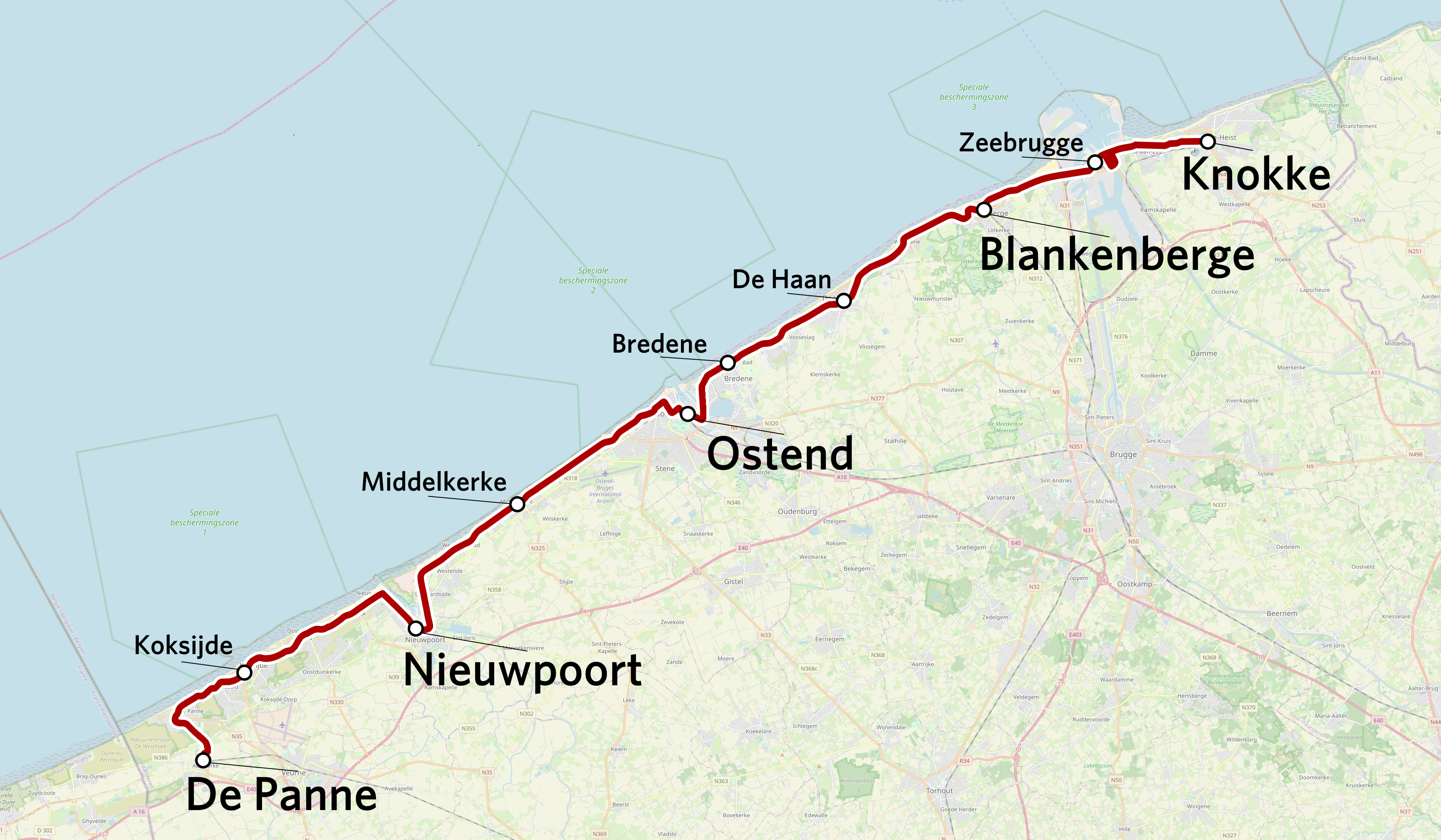
- Map of the route

Overview
- Native name: Kusttram
- Status: In Service
- Owner: De Lijn
- Locale: Belgian coastal towns from Knokke-Heist to De Panne.
- Stations: 67
- Website: https://www.delijn.be/en/content/kusttram/ De Kusttram

Service
- System: De Lijn, formerly National Company of Light Railways
- Depot(s): Adinkerke, De Panne, Nieuwpoortsesteenweg, Ostend, Knokke-Heist
- Rolling stock: 48 CAF Urbos Zeelijner

History
- Opened: 1885; 141 years ago

Technical
- Line length: 67 km (42 mi)
- Track gauge: 1,000 mm (3 ft 3 3/8 in) metre gauge
- Electrification: Overhead line, 600 V DC

The Coast Tram (Dutch: Kusttram) is a light rail service connecting the cities and towns along the Belgian (West Flanders) coast between De Panne, near the French border, and Knokke-Heist, near the Dutch border. At 67 kilometres (42 mi) in length, it is currently the world's longest metre gauge tram line, and the second-longest light rail service in the world after the A Line of the Los Angeles Metro Rail system, as well as one of the few interurban tramways in the world to remain in operation. The line is fully electrified at 600 V DC.

== History ==
What is now the coast line started out as part of the extensive Belgian Vicinal tramway, a network of interurban trams that once covered the entire nation. The first section of the coast line between Ostend and Nieuwpoort was opened in 1885. This original route was further inland than the modern one and only short parts of the original section in Ostend and Nieuwpoort centres are still in operation. On its creation, the line was managed by the NMVB (Nationale Maatschappij van Buurtspoorwegen), that operated an interurban tram system throughout Belgium. In 1991, the NMVB/SNCV was broken into two regional companies, one Walloon and the other Flemish, with the Flemish successor company, Vlaamse Vervoermaatschappij De Lijn taking responsibility for operation of the coastal tram.

== Route ==
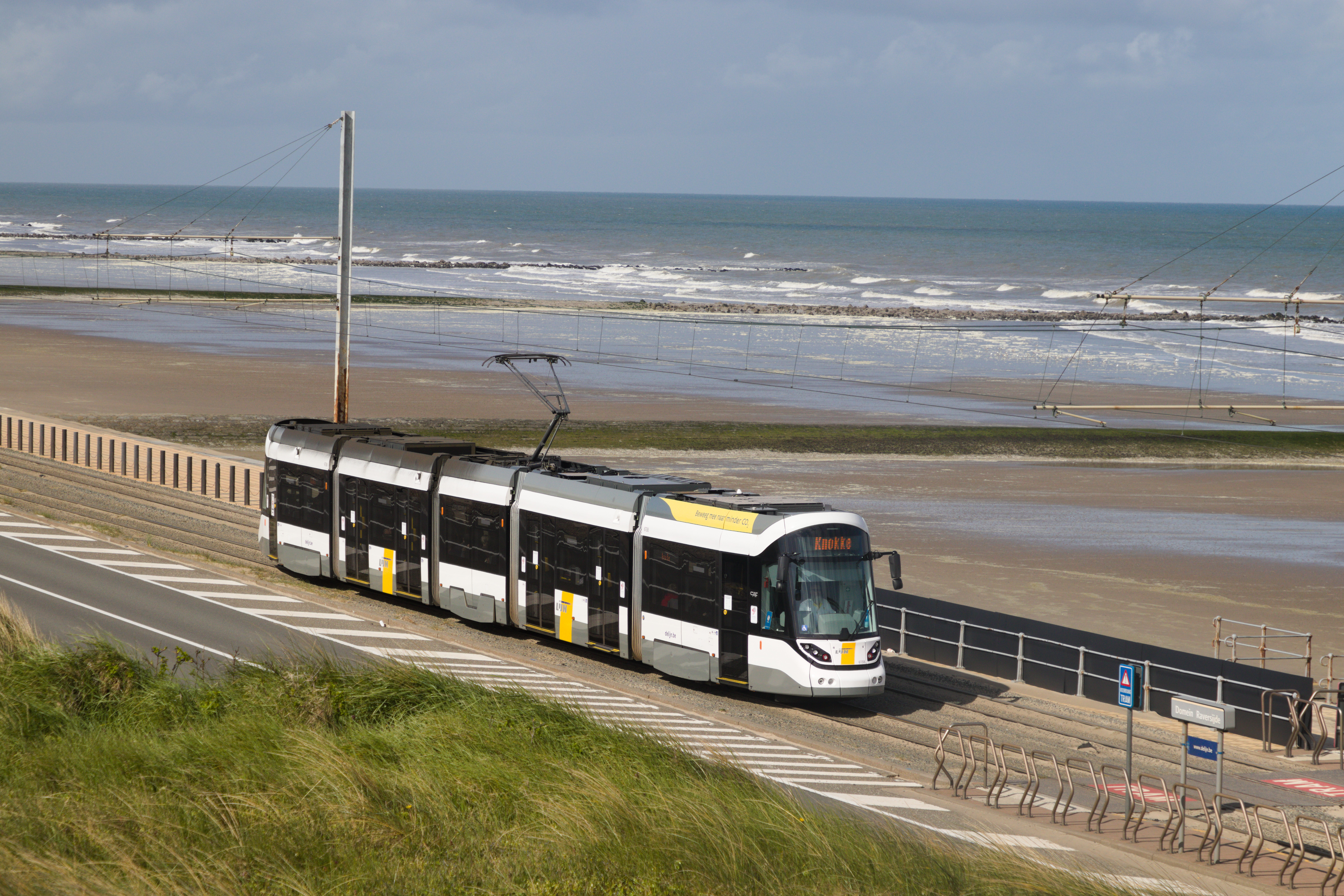
A CAF Urbos Zeelijner tram at Domein Raversijde

The service makes 67 stops along the almost 67 km (42 mi) line, with a tram running every 10 min during the peak summer months (every 20 min in the winter months), and in 2016 was used by roughly 15 million passengers.

Notable features are the sea-view between Ostend and Middelkerke, the tracks through the dunes at De Haan, the fast speed, the two alternative routes that exist around both ends of the Leopoldkanaal locks, and the similar single track diversion around the inland end of the Boudewijnkanaal lock.

The maximum speed is officially 70 kilometres per hour (43 mph). This speed is common between the villages.

== Fares and ticketing ==
The Coast Tram is part of the De Lijn network with a flat fare of €3 regardless of distance travelled, including transfers starting within 60 minutes of the initial journey. Multi-journey and unlimited tickets are also available.

== Rolling stock ==
In 2021–22, 48 new CAF Urbos Zeelijner low-floor trams entered service to replace all the older BN series 6000, the last of which was withdrawn on 23 September 2023. The series 6000 were similar to the Métro Léger de Charleroi LRV fleet and, to a lesser extent, the LRTA 1000 class of the Manila Light Rail Transit System yellow line. They were originally six-axle vehicles with two sections, but later extended with an extra low-floor centre section. During the summers from 2006 to 2022 HermeLijn trams were loaned from Ghent and Antwerp tram networks (also operated by De Lijn) for use on the coast tram line. All trams, except the loaned HermeLijn from Ghent are unidirectional and have to be turned on a loop in order to reverse direction.

== Gallery ==
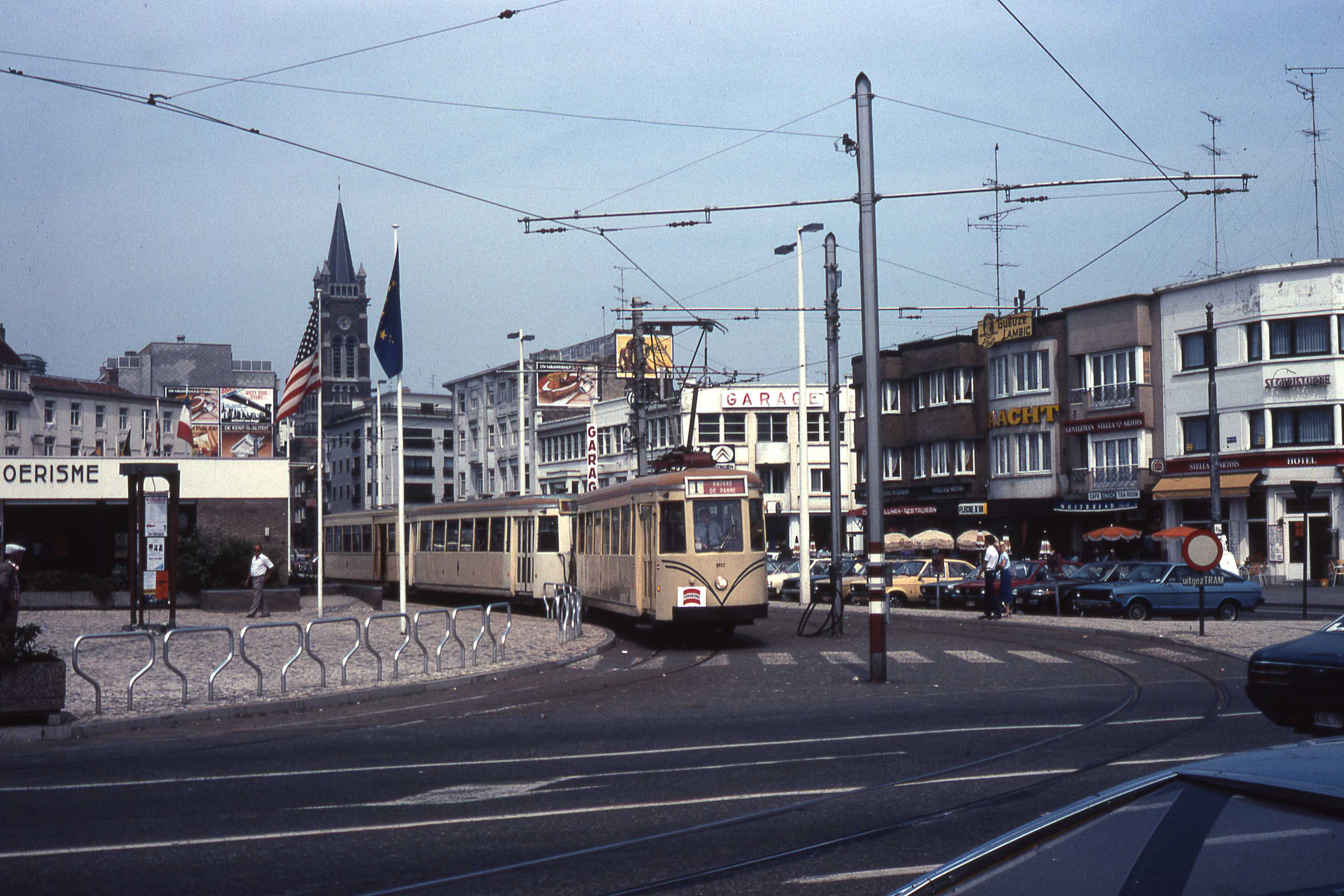
Classic tram in 1980s (Blankenberge)

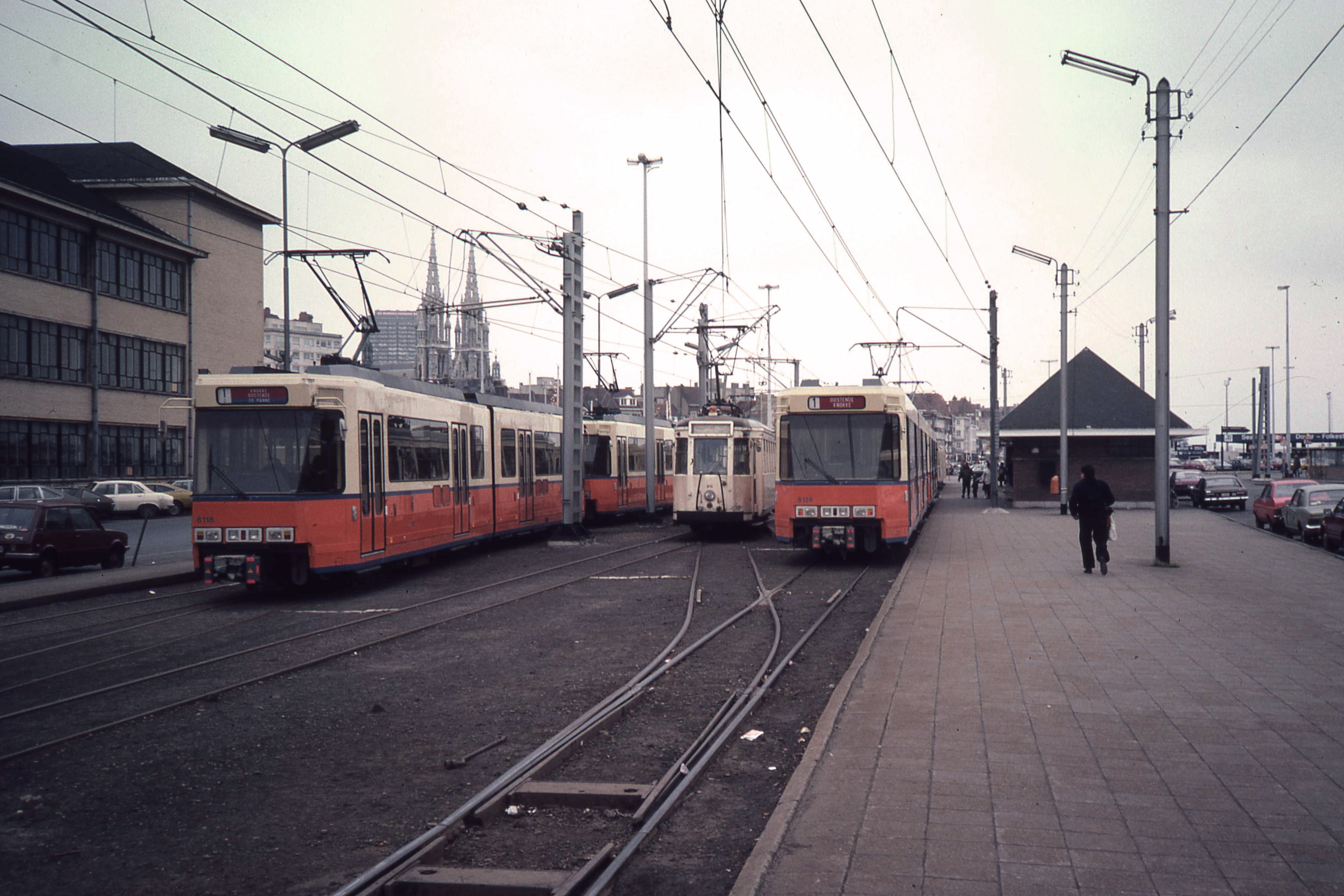
Oostende station in 1982

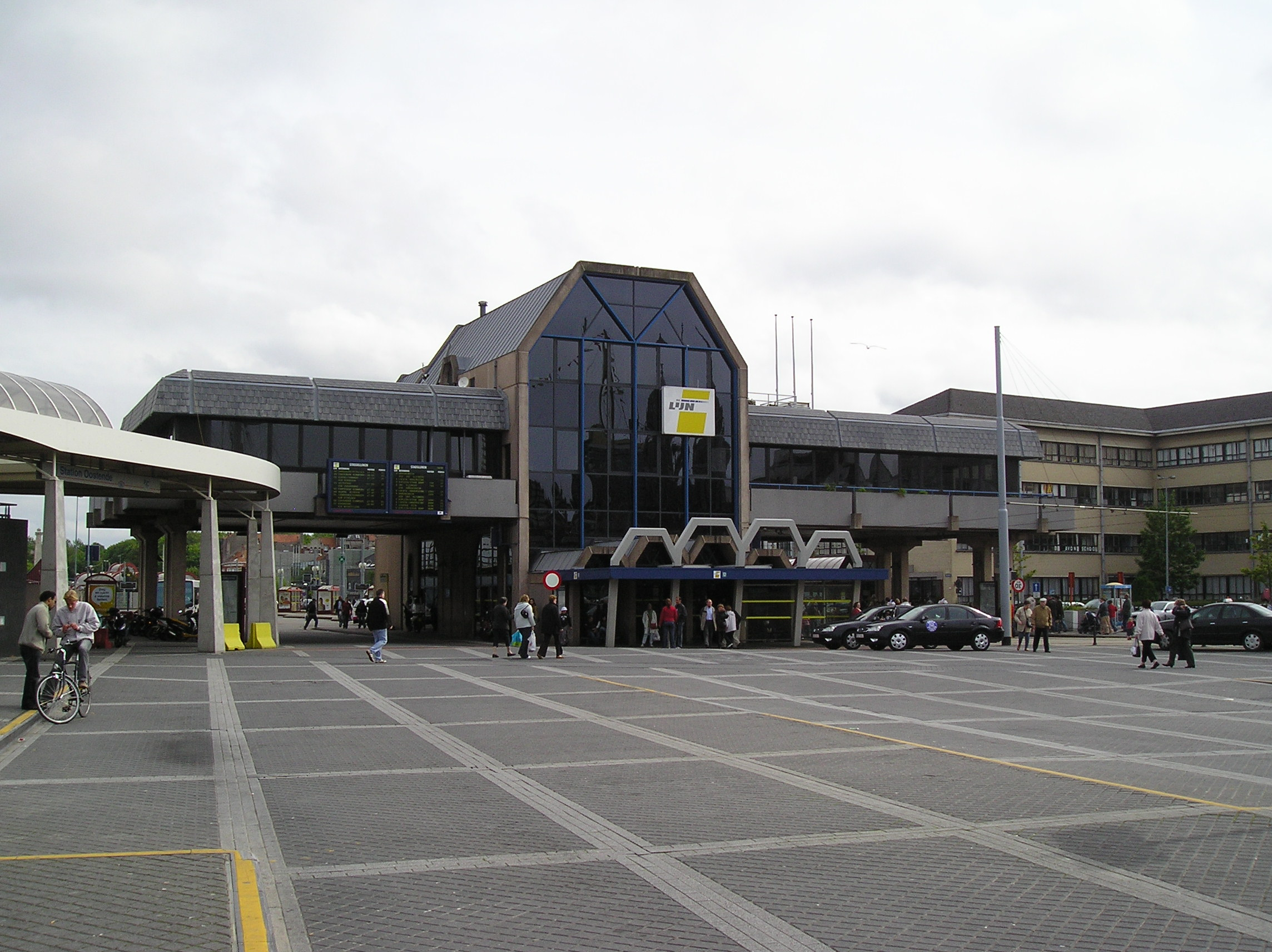
Ostend (old tram station, demolished in 2019)

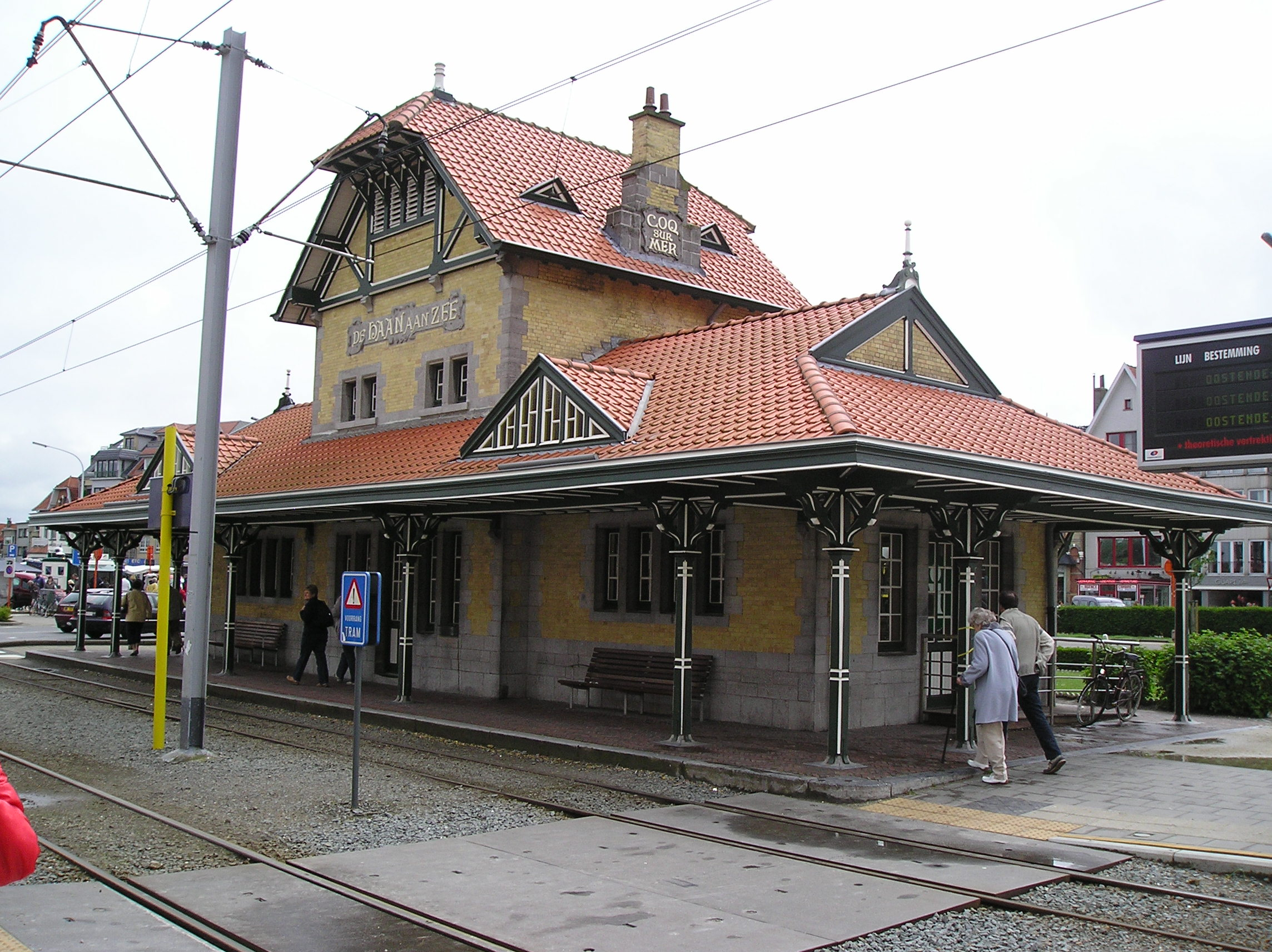
De Haan station (opened in 1902)

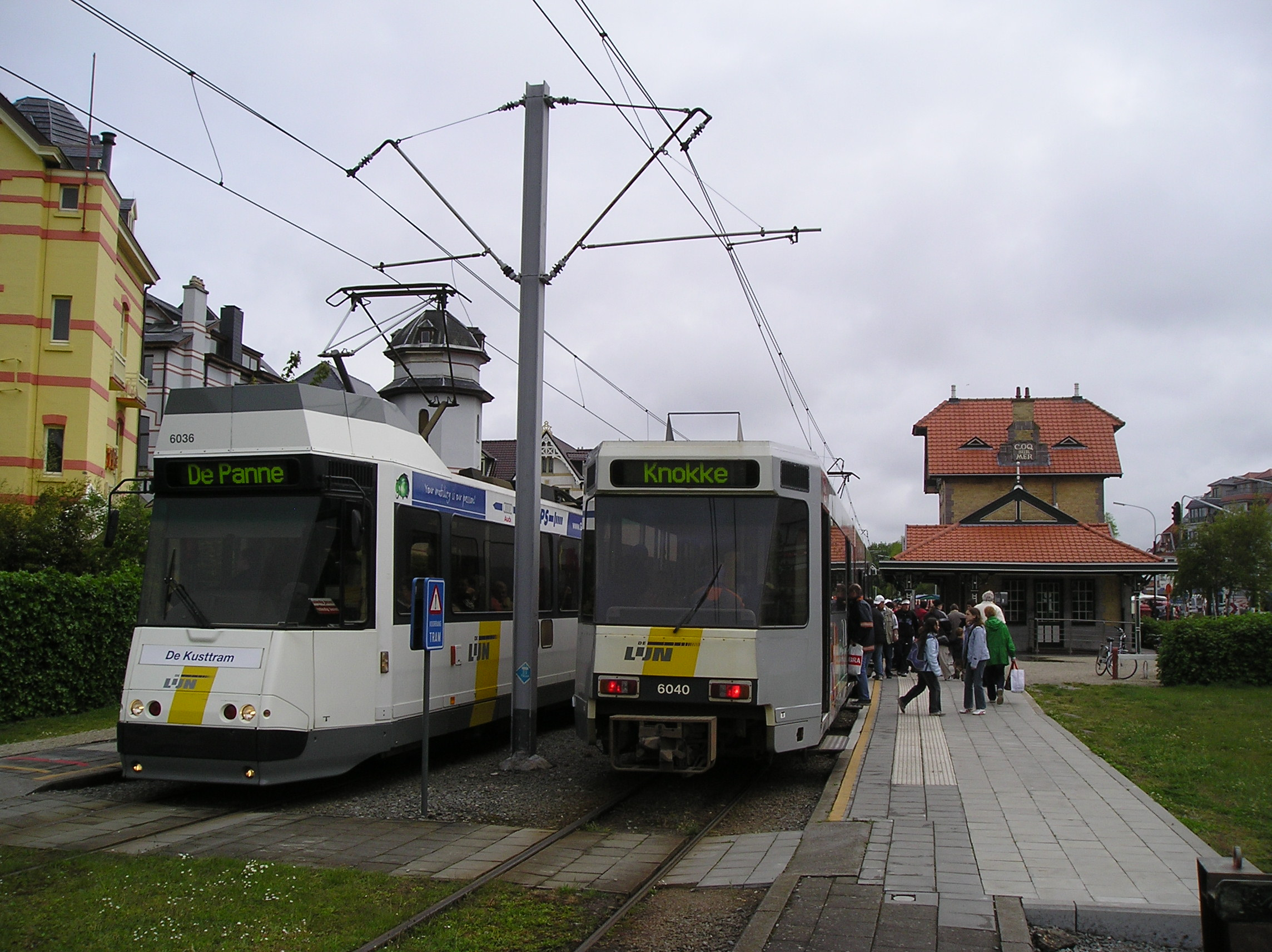
Trams in De Haan station

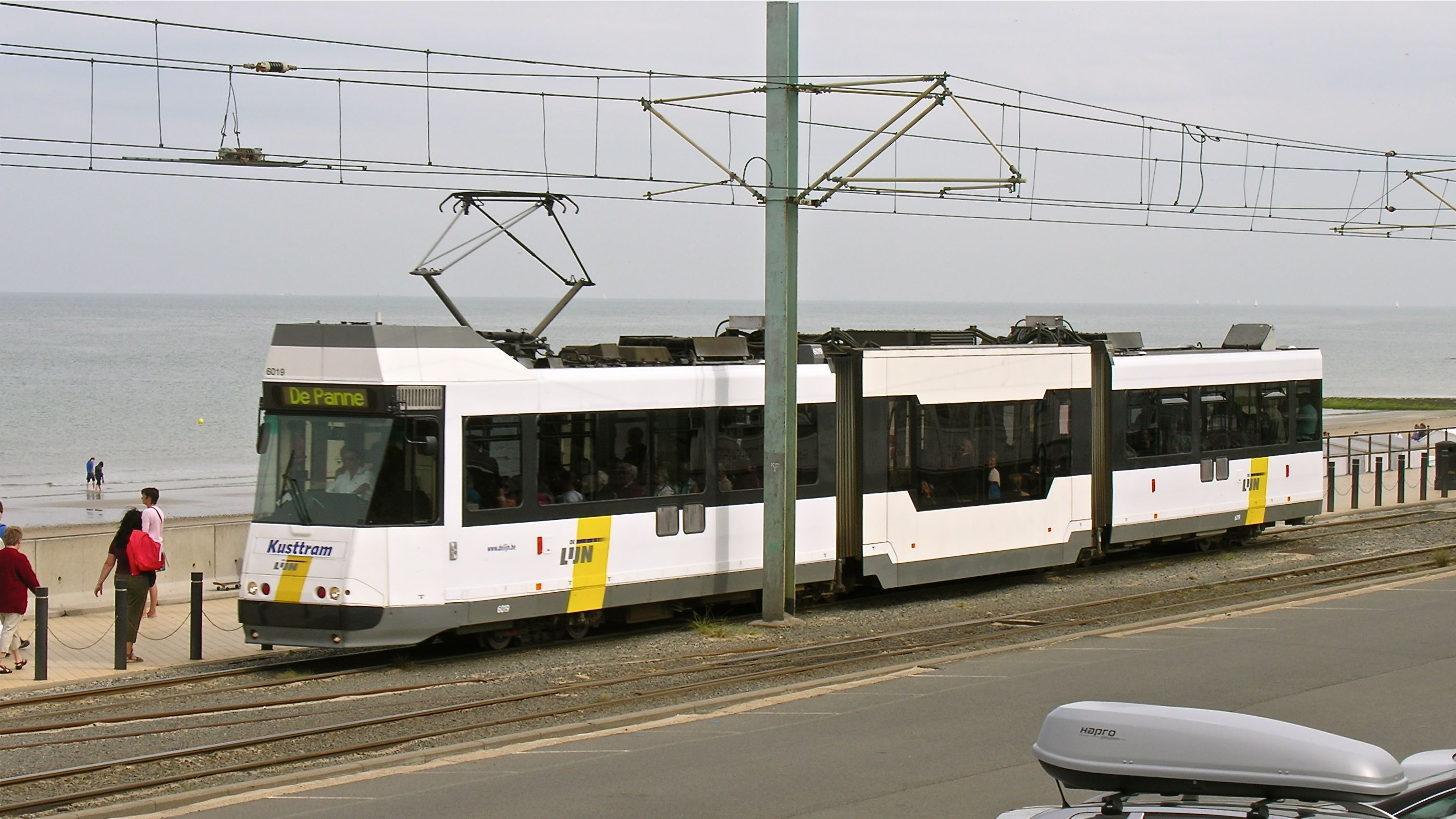
BN tram at Middelkerke

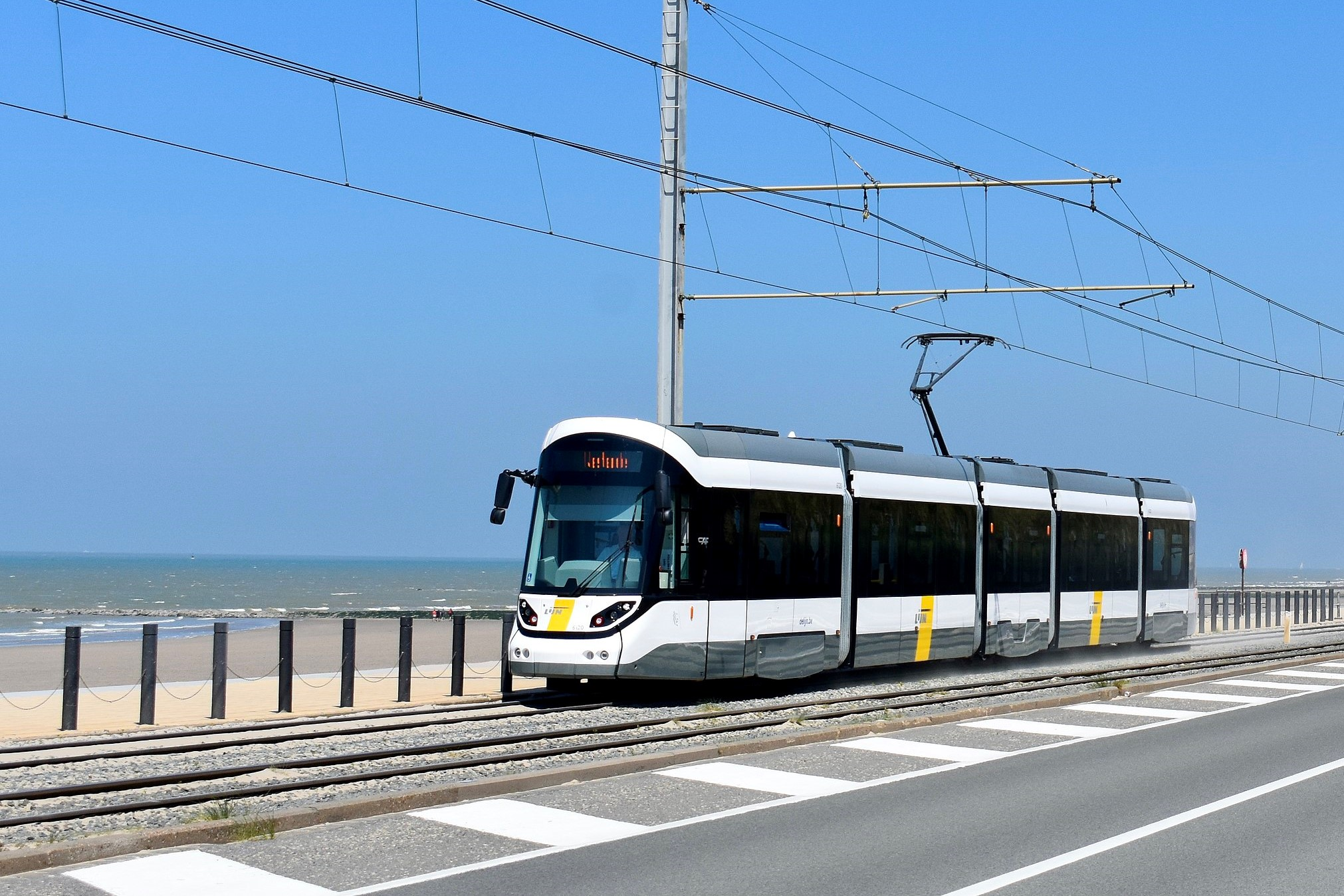
CAF Urbos tram

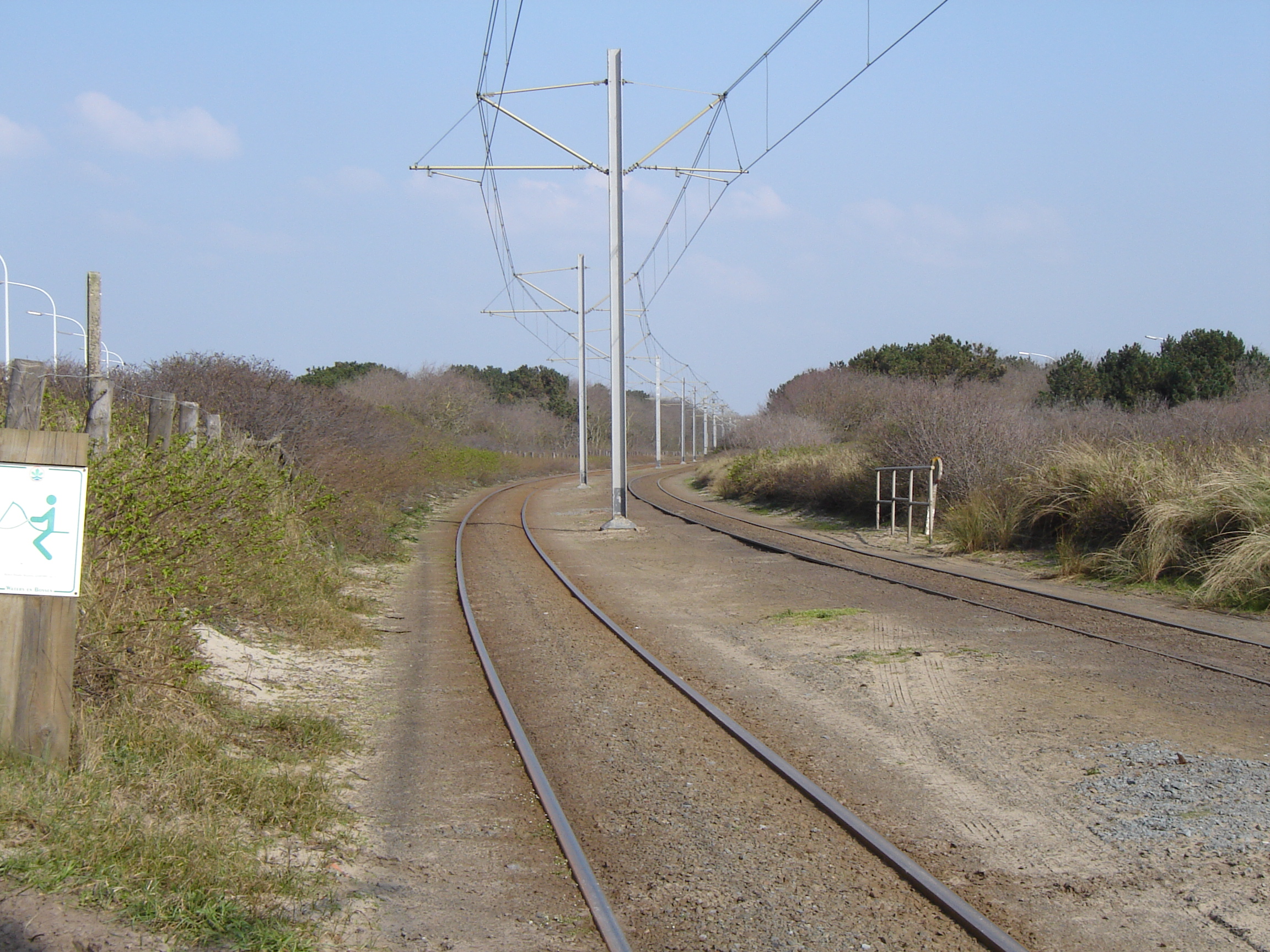
Tracks between De Haan and Wenduine

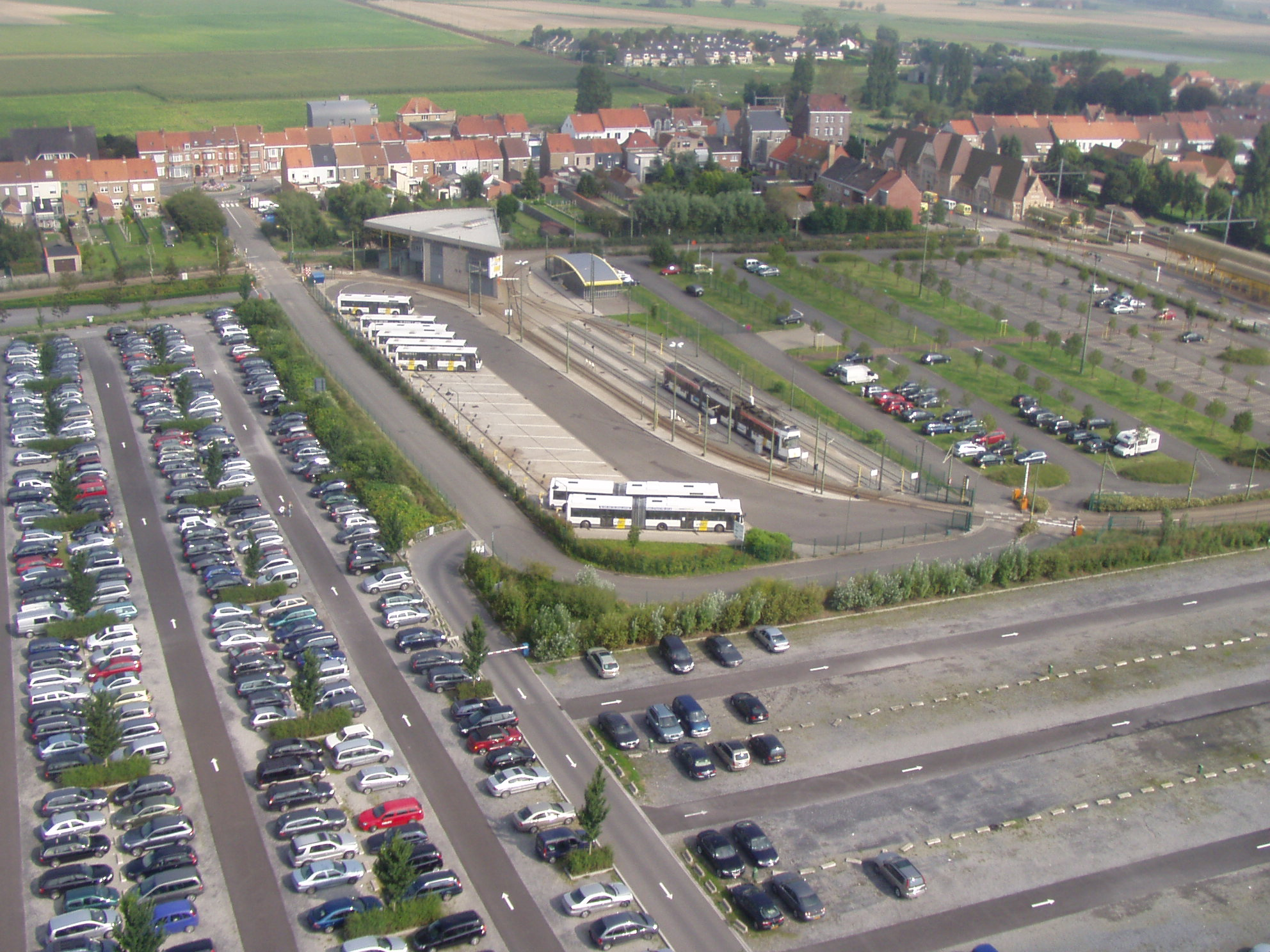
Depot at Adinkerke

== See also ==
- De Lijn
- List of town tramway systems in Belgium
- NMVB / SNCV
