= Belgian railway line 50A =

Railway line in Belgium

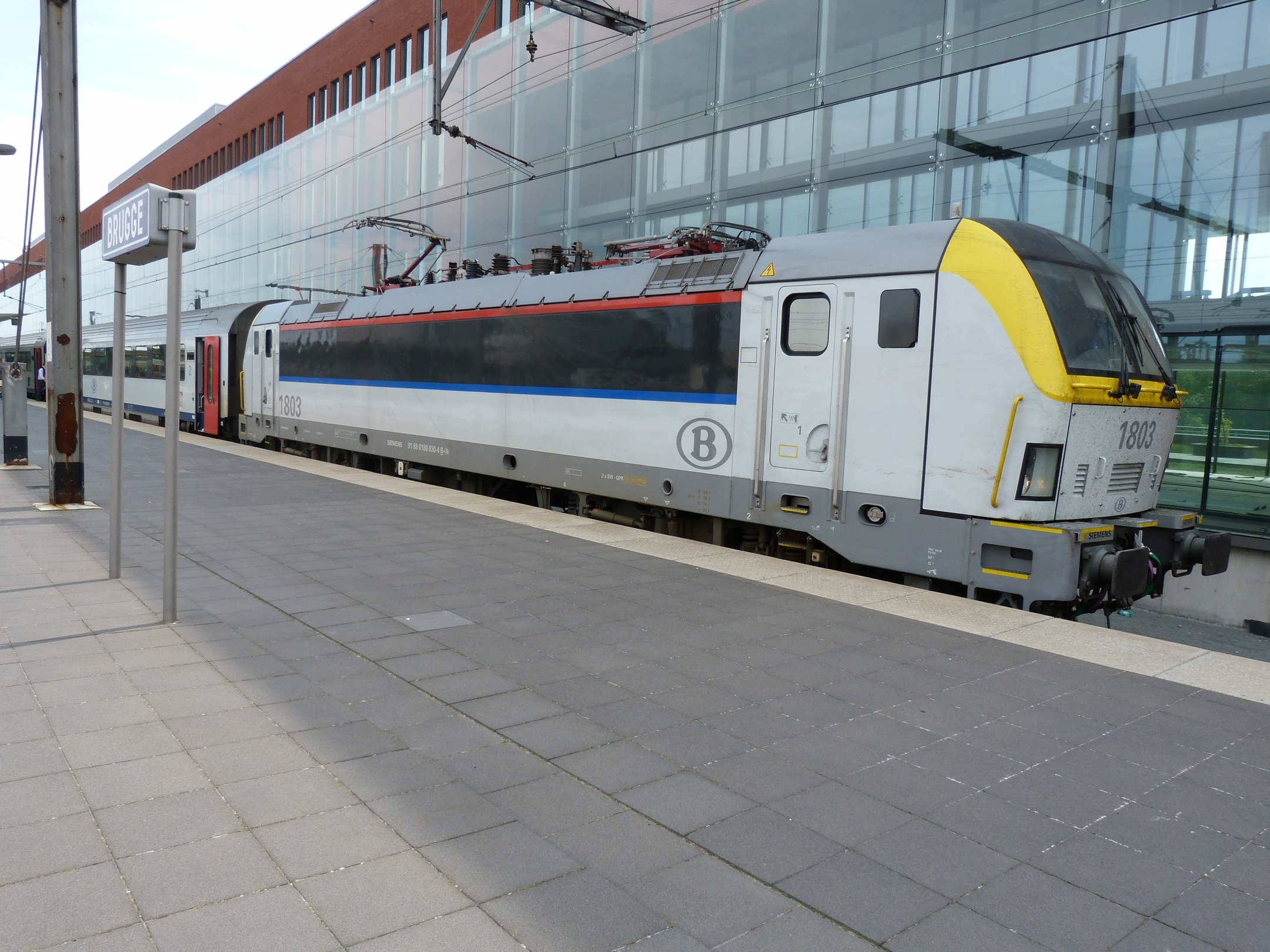
- Brugge station with NMBS InterCity train

Overview
- Status: Operational
- Locale: Belgium
- Termini: Brussels-South railway station; Ostend railway station

Service
Services
- Operator(s): National Railway Company of Belgium

History
- Opened: 1838-1933

Technical
- Line length: 114 km (71 mi)
- Number of tracks: double track
- Track gauge: 1,435 mm (4 ft 8 1/2 in) standard gauge
- Electrification: 3 kV DC
- Operating speed: 160 km/h (99 mph)
Route map
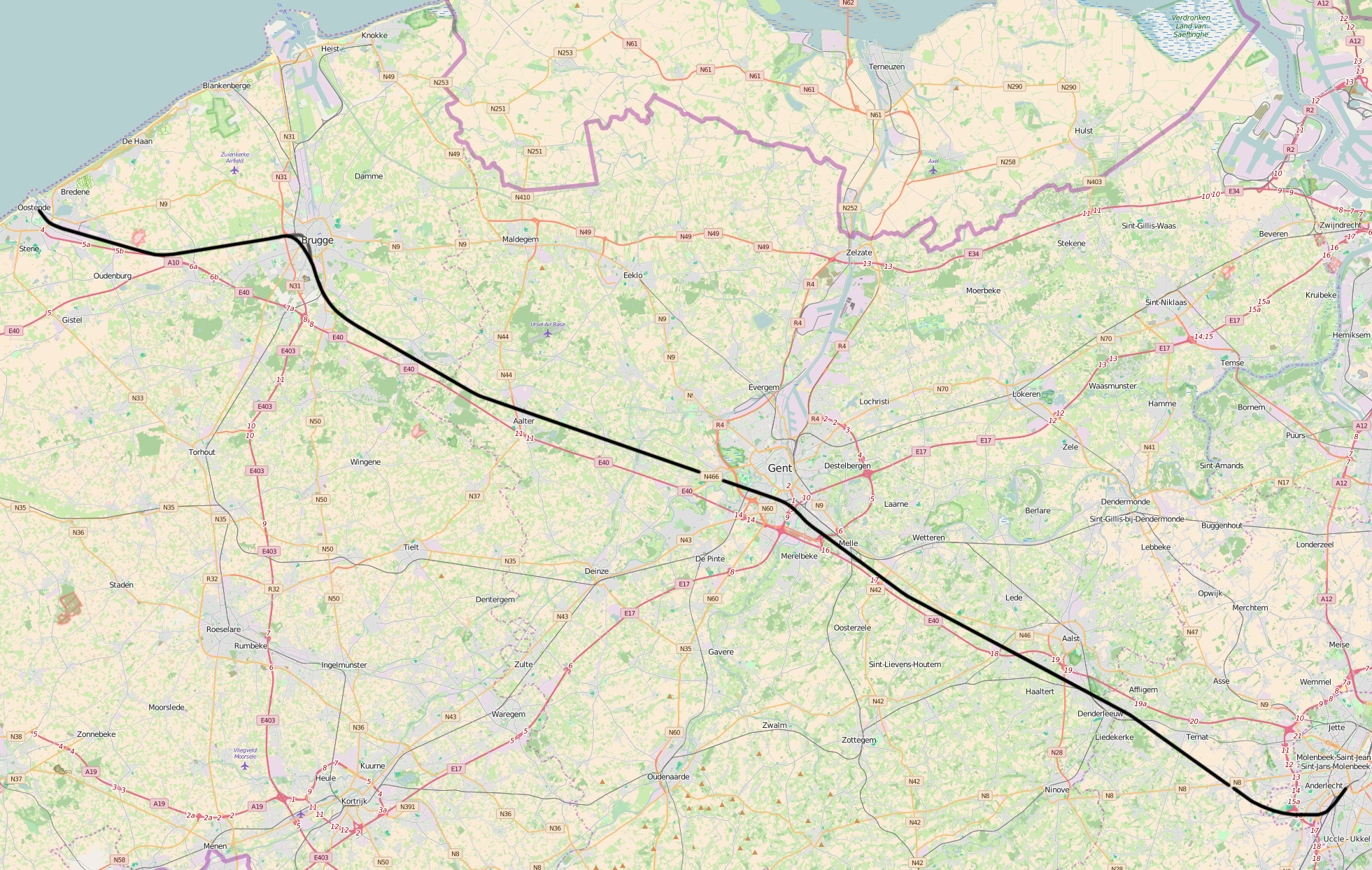

The Belgian railway line 50A is a railway line in Belgium connecting Brussels to Ostend through Ghent and Bruges. The section between Ghent and Ostend was completed in 1838. The section between Ghent and Brussels was opened between 1923 and 1933, offering a faster connection than the existing line 50. The total length of the line is 114.3 km.

== Stations ==
The main interchange stations on line 50A are:

- Brussels-South: to Antwerp, Liège, Namur, Charleroi and Mons
- Gent-Sint-Pieters: to Antwerp, Kortrijk and Oudenaarde
- Bruges: to Kortrijk, Zeebrugge, Blankenberge and Knokke

== Former stations ==
- Jabbeke railway station
