= Meir premetro station =

Meir
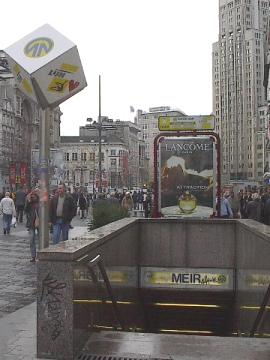

General information
- Location: Belgium
- Coordinates: 51°13′06.114″N 04°24′20.874″E
- Operator: De Lijn

Construction
- Structure type: underground
- Platform levels: 2

History
- Opened: 25 March 1975

Services
Preceding station	Antwerp tram	Following station
Groenplaats towards P+R Melsele	Tram route 3	Opera towards P+R Merksem
Groenplaats towards P+R Linkeroever	Tram route 5	Opera towards Wijnegem
Groenplaats towards P+R Linkeroever	Tram route 9	Opera towards P+R Wommelgem
Groenplaats towards Regatta	Tram route 15	Opera towards P+R Boechout
Location
- Location within the Antwerp premetro network

Meir is a station in the Antwerp premetro which opened on 23 March 1975. The station is located directly underneath the street Meir, after which it is named.

With Groenplaats and Opera, Meir forms the oldest part of the city's premetro network. It is served by tramlines 3, 5, 9 and 15. Tram line 7 passes in close proximity at street level.

== Location ==
The station is located in central Antwerp at the western end of the Meir street. In its immediate vicinity is the Boerentoren, a 1930s art deco building which at the time of its construction was Europe's first skyscraper.
