= Diamant (Antwerp premetro station) =

Premetro station in Antwerp

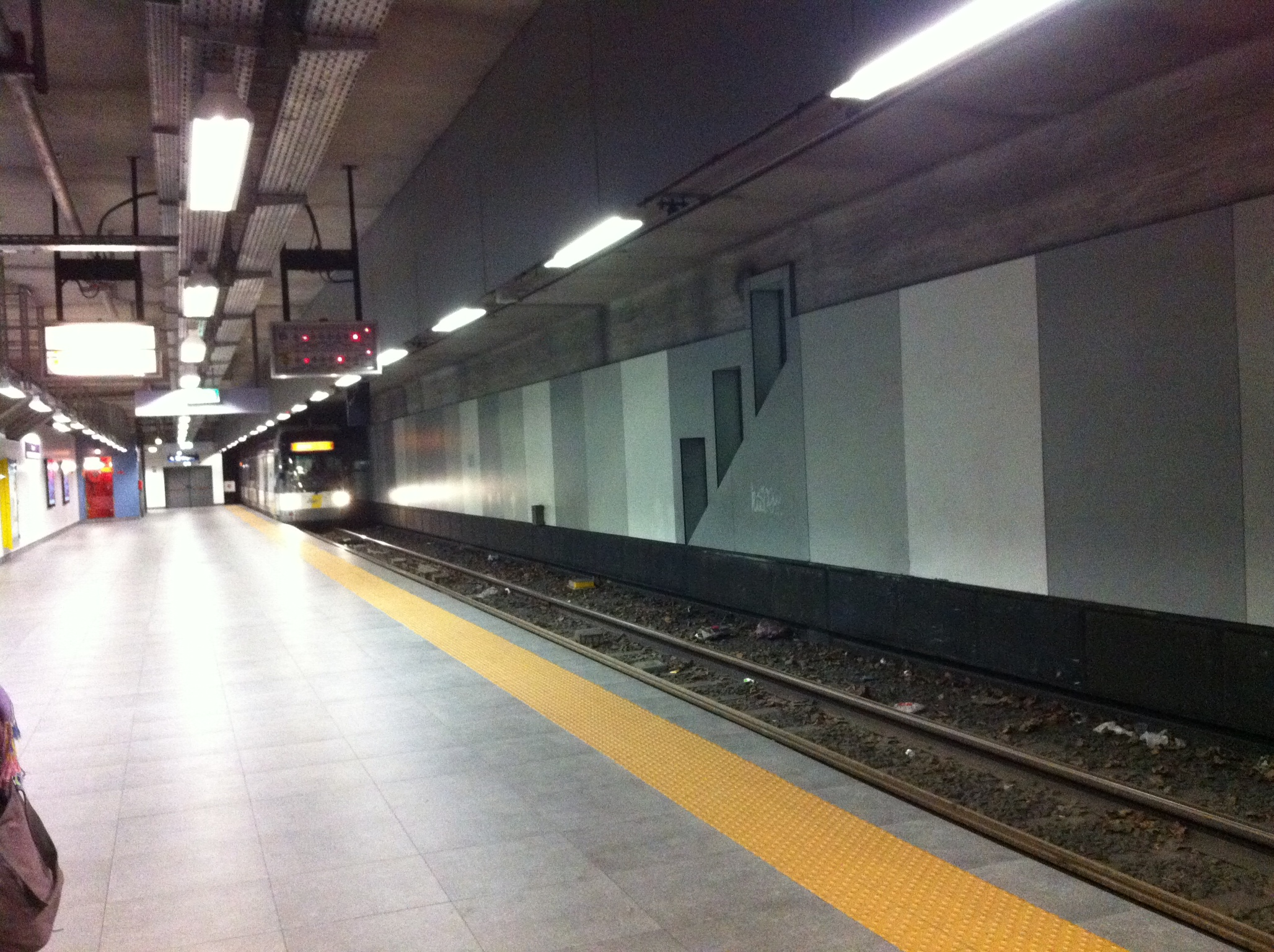

General information
- Coordinates: 51°13′00″N 4°25′14″E
- Owner: De Lijn
- Tracks: 2

Construction
- Structure type: Underground
- Platform levels: 2

History
- Opened: 10 March 1980

Services
Preceding station	Antwerp tram	Following station
Astrid towards P+R Merksem	Tram route 2	Plantin towards Hoboken
Astrid towards P+R Luchtbal	Tram route 6	Plantin towards P+R Olympiade
Opera towards P+R Linkeroever	Tram route 9	Plantin towards P+R Wommelgem
Opera towards Regatta	Tram route 15	Plantin towards P+R Boechout
Location
- Location within the Antwerp premetro network

Diamant premetro station is an Antwerp Premetro station. Located under the Pelikaanstraat and next to Antwerp Central Station, it is served by lines 2, 6, 9 and 15.

This station was built during the second construction phase (opened on March 10, 1980) and is the deepest used premetro station in Antwerp. Because the Pelikaanstraat is a very narrow street, the station was built as a ± 200 meters long corridor in four levels.

The level -1 is a long entrance hall with exits along the De Keyserlei, Antwerp Central Station and the parking underneath the Astridplein (with an underground passage to Astrid). The exit at the corner the Pelikaanstraat and the Vestingstraat is out of order, and is now used as an emergency exit.

The level -2 is a second entrance hall for direct access to Antwerp Central Station and the access to the 90 meters long platforms. The level -3 is the platform towards Opera and Astrid. The level -4 is the deepest and goes to Plantin and out of town.

In 2009-2010 the station was converted with better signage and elevators for better accessibility towards wheelchair users. The level -1 was converted to a corridor. The corridor to the premetro station Astrid and the exits on the Koningin Astridplein are from that period.

In 1980 only tram routes 2 and 15 served this station. On October 27, 2007, tram route 6 joined, and on September 1, 2012, tram route 9 joined.

== See also ==
- Trams in Antwerp
