= Groenplaats (Antwerp premetro station) =

Premetro station in Antwerp, Belgium

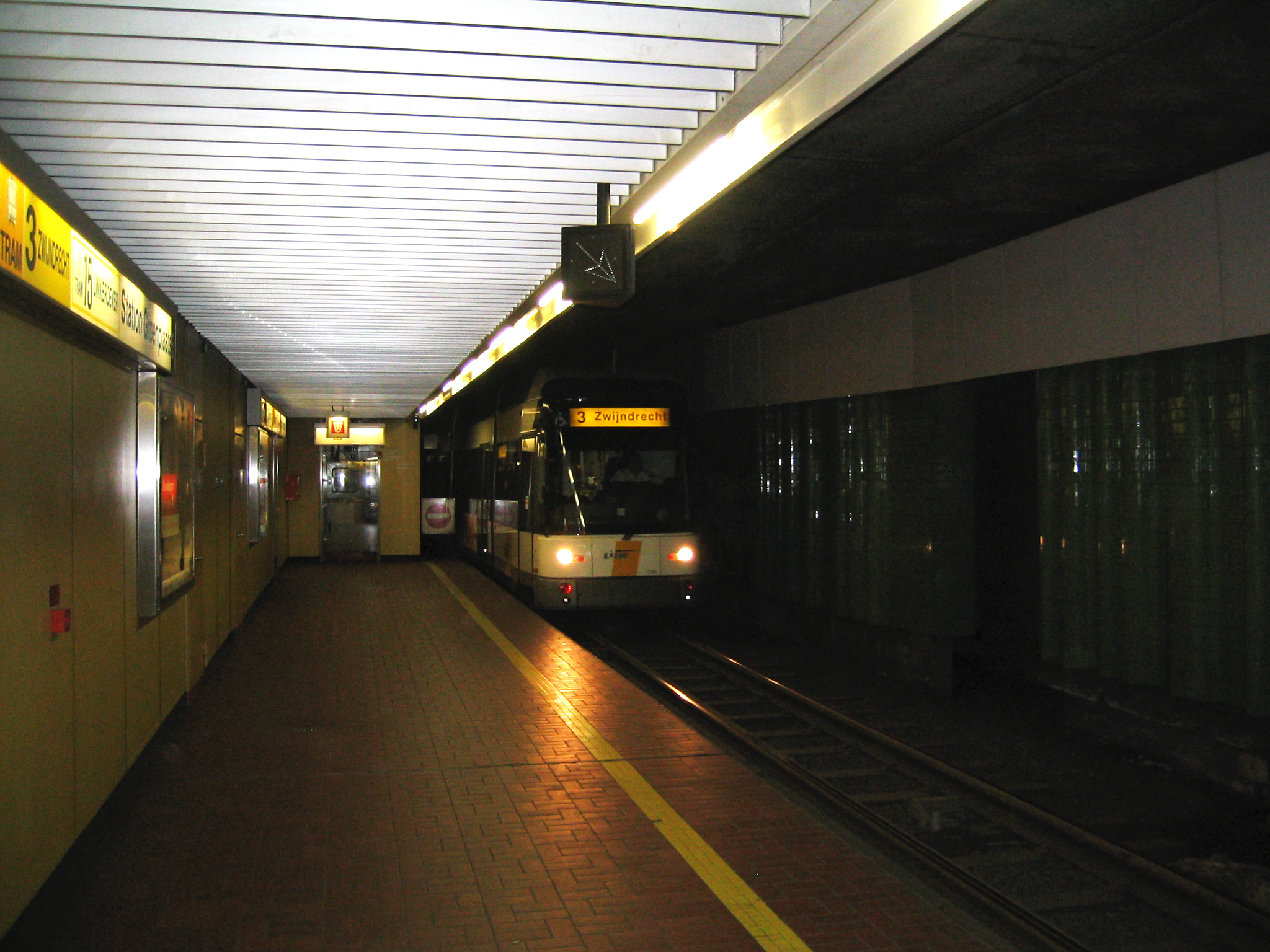

General information
- Coordinates: 51°13′7″N 4°24′6″E
- Owner: De Lijn
- Tracks: 2

Construction
- Structure type: Underground
- Platform levels: 2

History
- Opened: 25 March 1975

Services
Preceding station	Antwerp tram	Following station
Van Eeden towards P+R Melsele	Tram route 3	Meir towards P+R Merksem
Van Eeden towards P+R Linkeroever	Tram route 5	Meir towards Wijnegem
Van Eeden towards P+R Linkeroever	Tram route 9	Meir towards P+R Wommelgem
Van Eeden towards Regatta	Tram route 15	Meir towards P+R Boechout
Location
- Location within the Antwerp premetro network

Groenplaats premetro station is an Antwerp premetro station. Located underneath the Groenplaats, it is served by lines 3, 5, 9 and 15.

Groenplaats premetro station was opened on 25 March 1975 and is one of the oldest premetro stations in Antwerp. It is recognizable by the green decoration on the platform toward Linkeroever in the brick decoration toward Meir. On the platforms one can see The Rainforest, an artwork of Menno, a green tile wall in waves.

Originally was this station a terminus. There was a loop underneath the Groenplaats where the trams could go back to Meir. The loop is now a dead end.

The level -1 is a ticket hall and leads to two platforms. It has exits that lead to the Karel de Grote-Hogeschool, the Groenplaats, the underground parking and GB Shopping Center. On the level -2 is the platform to Linkeroever, and on the level -3 the platform to Meir.

Originally line 2 and line 15 served this station. On 1 April 1996 line 3 was connected to this station, and line 5 followed on 4 March 2006. On 1 September 2012 line 2 was replaced by line 9.

== See also ==
- Trams in Antwerp
