= Opera (Antwerp premetro station) =

Premetro station in Antwerp, Belgium

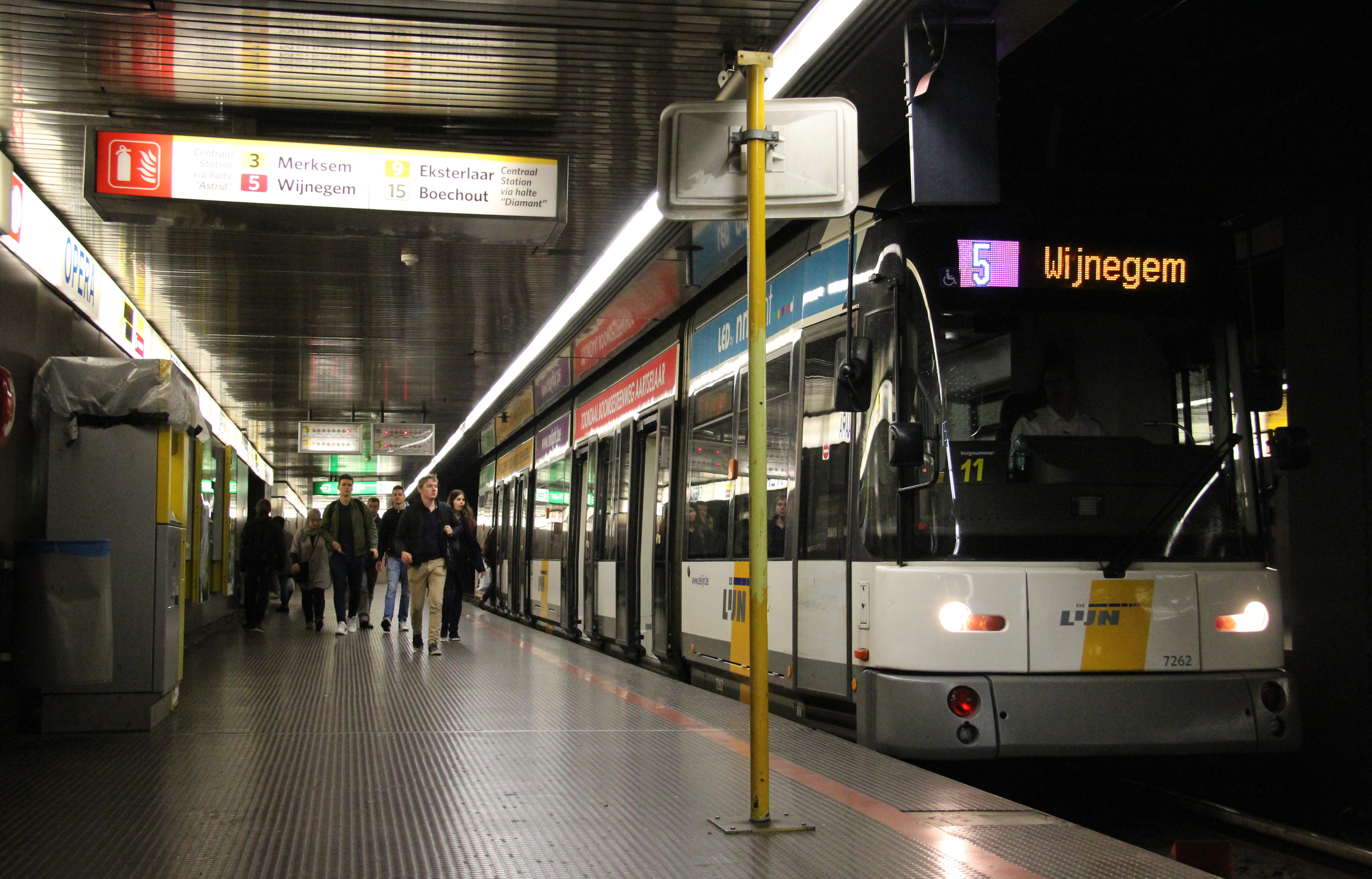

General information
- Location: Belgium
- Coordinates: 51°13′05″N 04°24′56″E
- Operator: De Lijn

Construction
- Structure type: underground
- Platform levels: 2

History
- Opened: 25 March 1975
- Rebuilt: 8 December 2019

Services
Preceding station	Antwerp tram	Following station
Meir towards P+R Melsele	Tram route 3	Astrid towards P+R Merksem
Meir towards P+R Linkeroever	Tram route 5	Astrid towards Wijnegem
Meir towards P+R Linkeroever	Tram route 9	Diamant towards P+R Wommelgem
Stadspark towards P+R Schoonselhof	Tram route 10	Astrid towards Wijnegem
Meir towards Regatta	Tram route 15	Diamant towards P+R Boechout
Location
- Location within the Antwerp premetro network

Opera is a station in the Antwerp premetro network, lying under the Leien near the Teniersplaats in the city centre. The station was opened on 25 March 1975 along with the initial opening of the Antwerp premetro network. The station was temporarily closed in 2016 in order to undergo a full renovation and expansion and reopened in its current form on 8 December 2019. The station lies in the immediate proximity of the Antwerp opera building and is a part of the central east-west premetro axis. It is served by the tram routes 3, 5, 9, 10 and 15.

== Location ==
Opera station lies in the center of Antwerp under the crossing of the Leien and the Keyserlei-Meir axis (called the Teniersplaats). To the north of the station lie the Antwerp opera, the Antwerp atheneum and the Rooseveltplaats bus station, where most city buses as well as tram routes 1, 11 and 24 halt. To the west, the station gives out onto the Leysstraat and the Meir, the main shopping street in Antwerp. To the east lies the Keyserlei, also counting numerous stores, restaurants and the UGC cinema, which runs toward Antwerp Central Station.

== Layout ==
Opera station is the largest of all 18 Antwerp premetro stations. Unique to the station are its large entrance hall and very wide platforms, spanning nearly 30 meters at some point. The station has a rather sober, yet luxurious decoration. Before the renovation, a clay figure artwork symbolising city traffic could be found in the entrance hall behind glass.

The -1 level originally contained a large entrance hall that had about the same size as the Teniersplaats. The hall contained a large number of pillars as well as a single newspaper stand. Along the walls of the entrance hall, multiple open spaces could be found, constructed for small shops. After the renewal of the northern part of the Leien, the hall has been split in two by a newly constructed car tunnel, allowing car traffic to go underneath the Teniersplaats. Consequently, it is no longer possible to use the hall as an underground crossing of the Leien.

The -2 level contains two 90 meter long east-west platforms facing each other, which would have allowed real metro trains to stop at the station, would the Antwerp premetro ever have been upgraded to a full scale metro network. Also, the control centre of the entire Antwerp premetro network could be found here, before it was moved to the Italiëlei in August 2015.

The -3 level contains two more 90 meter long platforms, perpendicular to those at the -2 level, in a north-south orientation. The platforms were built in the 1970s, but due to budgetary problems, they were left in an unfinished state for several decades. The platforms were eventually finished and taken into service alongside the reopening of the station in 2019. In the northern direction, the platforms connect to the eastern premetro tunnel, going to the turning loop at the Rooseveltplaats and then -1 level of Astrid station. To the south, the tunnel originally ended after leaving Opera station. As a part of the Noorderlijn works, a new tunnel section was dug ending in an entry slope on the Frankrijklei. The -3 level is currently only used by tram route 10.

== Unused car tunnel ==
Behind the walls of the southward platform were two unused tunnel tubes for car traffic, going under the Teniersplaats and Rooseveltplaats. The tubes were constructed in the 1970s, and were, just like the platforms, never opened. At the beginning of their construction, in 1972, a temporary steel bridge was built over the Rooseveltplaats to minimize traffic problems. The bridge was eventually broken up 34 years later, in 2006, the tunnels still not being finished. Later, when plans were made for the construction of a car tunnel under the Operaplein, as a part of the renewal of the northern part of the Leien, it was decided not to finish the existing tunnel at -3, but to construct a new tunnel at the -1 level, as the existing tunnel tubes were apparently built too deep to allow for the construction of the tunnel entrances. Instead, the old tunnels were incorporated into a new underground car park constructed alongside the other works, which eventually opened in July 2020.

== Tram routes ==
The station is currently serviced by tram routes 3, 5, 9, 10 and 15.
