= Van Eeden (Antwerp premetro station) =

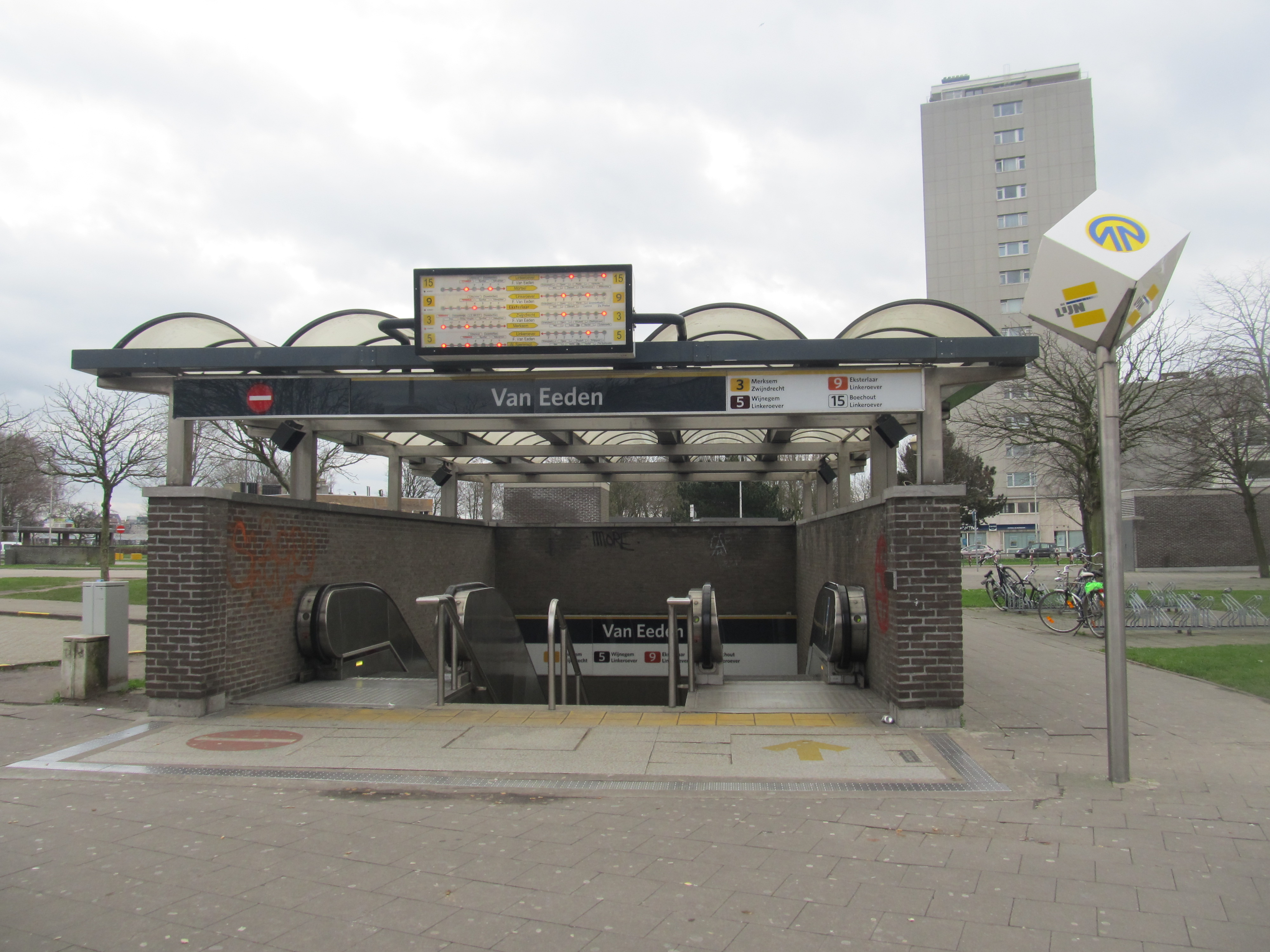

General information
- Location: Belgium
- Coordinates: 51°13′14″N 04°23′11″E
- Operator: De Lijn

Construction
- Structure type: underground
- Platform levels: 1

History
- Opened: 21 September 1990

Services
Preceding station	Antwerp tram	Following station
Halewijn towards P+R Melsele	Tram route 3	Groenplaats towards P+R Merksem
Halewijn towards P+R Linkeroever	Tram route 5	Groenplaats towards Wijnegem
Halewijn towards P+R Linkeroever	Tram route 9	Groenplaats towards P+R Wommelgem
Halewijn towards Regatta	Tram route 15	Groenplaats towards P+R Boechout
Location
- Location within the Antwerp premetro network

Frederik van Eeden (also known by the shorthand Van Eeden) is an underground station in the Antwerp premetro network located in the Linkeroever suburb on the left bank of the river Scheldt. The station was opened on 21 September 1990, the same time as the Brabotunnel, linking the station with Groenplaats station and allowing trams in the premetro network to cross the river Scheldt. The station is located directly underneath the F. Van Eedenplein, named after the writer of the same name.

== Layout ==
Van Eeden station is built completely in brick and has one above ground entrance, giving access to the Van Eeden bus station. In comparison to the other stations in the network, Van Eeden also lies relatively deep. At the -1 level of the station can be found a spacious entrance hall. The -2 level encompasses both 65m long platforms, although they are not exactly built at the same height. The design of the station differs from that of the earlier stations on the central Groenplaats-Opera axis, as the size of the entrance hall was reduced by about 50%, instead giving more space and a visual connection to the underlying platforms. In the entrance hall can also be found a large artwork by Flemish artist May Claerhout, matching the pointy shaped roof of the hall.

On the western side, away from the River Scheldt and the downtown area, the station connects to the 442m long ramp on the Biancefloerlaan, allowing traffic in and out of the premetro network.

The station also contains a large power supply installation, providing power for the entire tram network between the station and the Linkeroever P+R terminus. Also, due to its proximity to the river Scheldt, the station is equipped with large water pumping installations. Even so, however, condensation still often occurs above the platforms.

== Tram routes ==
The station is currently serviced by tram routes 3, 5, 9 and 15, the four tram routes making use of the central premetro axis.
