= Franklin Rooseveltplaats =

Square in Antwerp, Belgium

- City square
- {{{other_names}}}
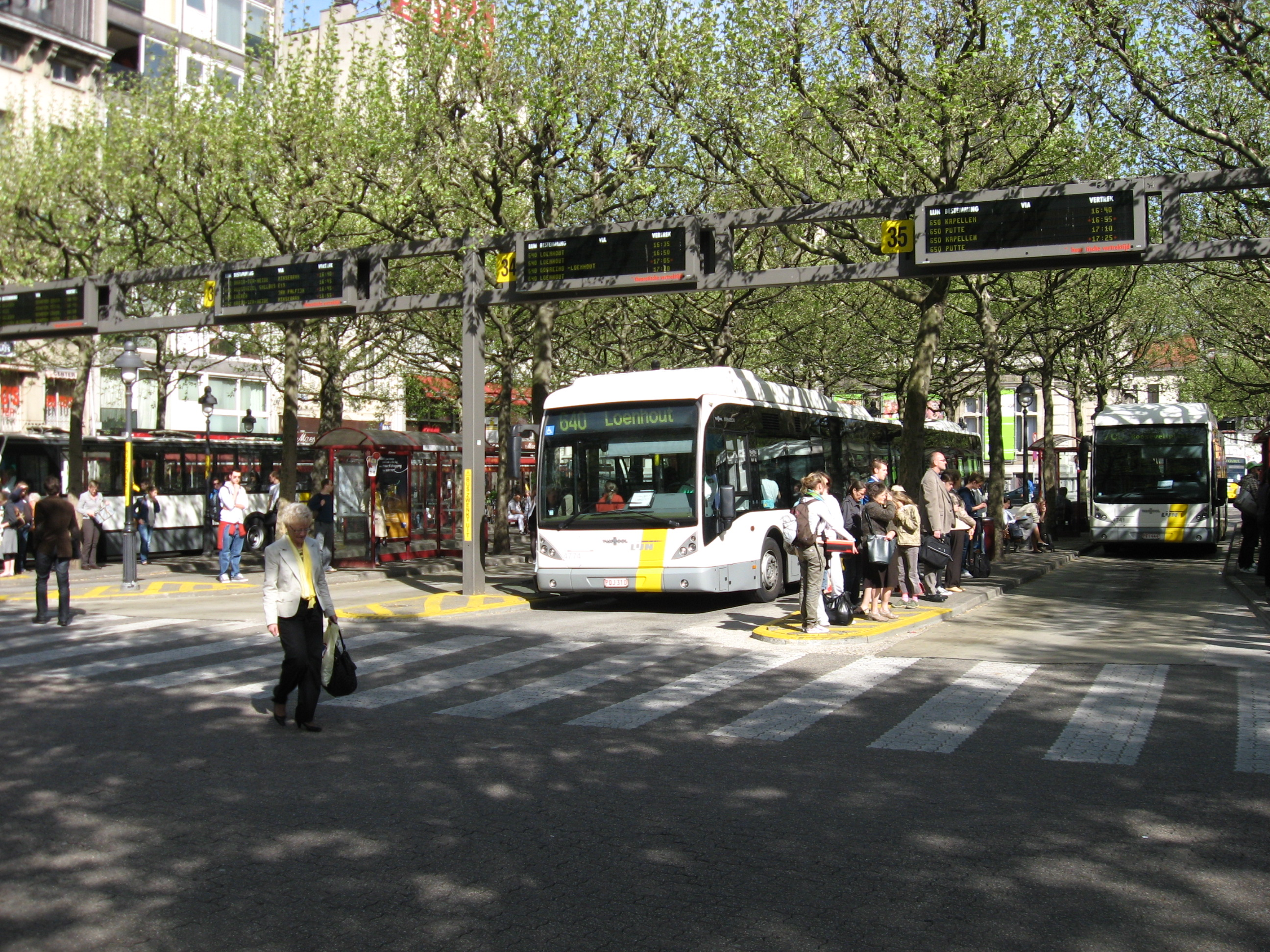
- Several buses at the northbound platforms
- Opened: 1860
- Dedicated to: Franklin D. Roosevelt, 32nd President of the United States
- Location: Crossing of the Leien, Turnhoutsebaan and Kipdorpbrug; Antwerp, Belgium
- Interactive map of Franklin Rooseveltplaats
- Coordinates: 51°13′10.8″N 4°25′2.7″E

The Franklin Rooseveltplaats (English: Franklin Roosevelt Square) is a large square in the city of Antwerp, Belgium, placed at the crossing of the Leien and Turnhoutsebaan, and within walking distance of the Koningin Astridplein and Antwerp-Central station. The square functions primarily as the main bus station in Antwerp, which with its 28 platforms handles a large part of all bus transport in the city, as well as several tram routes.

== History ==
The square is built on the spot were the Kipdorp gate previously stood, a part of the 16th century city walls that were demolished in 1860. It was initially called the "Victorieplaats" ("Victory square"), after the victory of the citizens over the French Duke of Anjou in an effort to conquer the city known as the French Fury. However, a few years later, in 1868, it was decided to rename the square as the "Gemeenteplaats" ("Municipality square "), after the victorious citizens (called "Gemeentenaars") in the same event. The street joining the square with the Astridplein was in the same fashion named the "Gemeentestraat" (and still bears this name today). Apart from the official name, the square was also regularly called the "Geuzenhofkes" by local citizens, referring to the many plants functioning as decoration on the square.

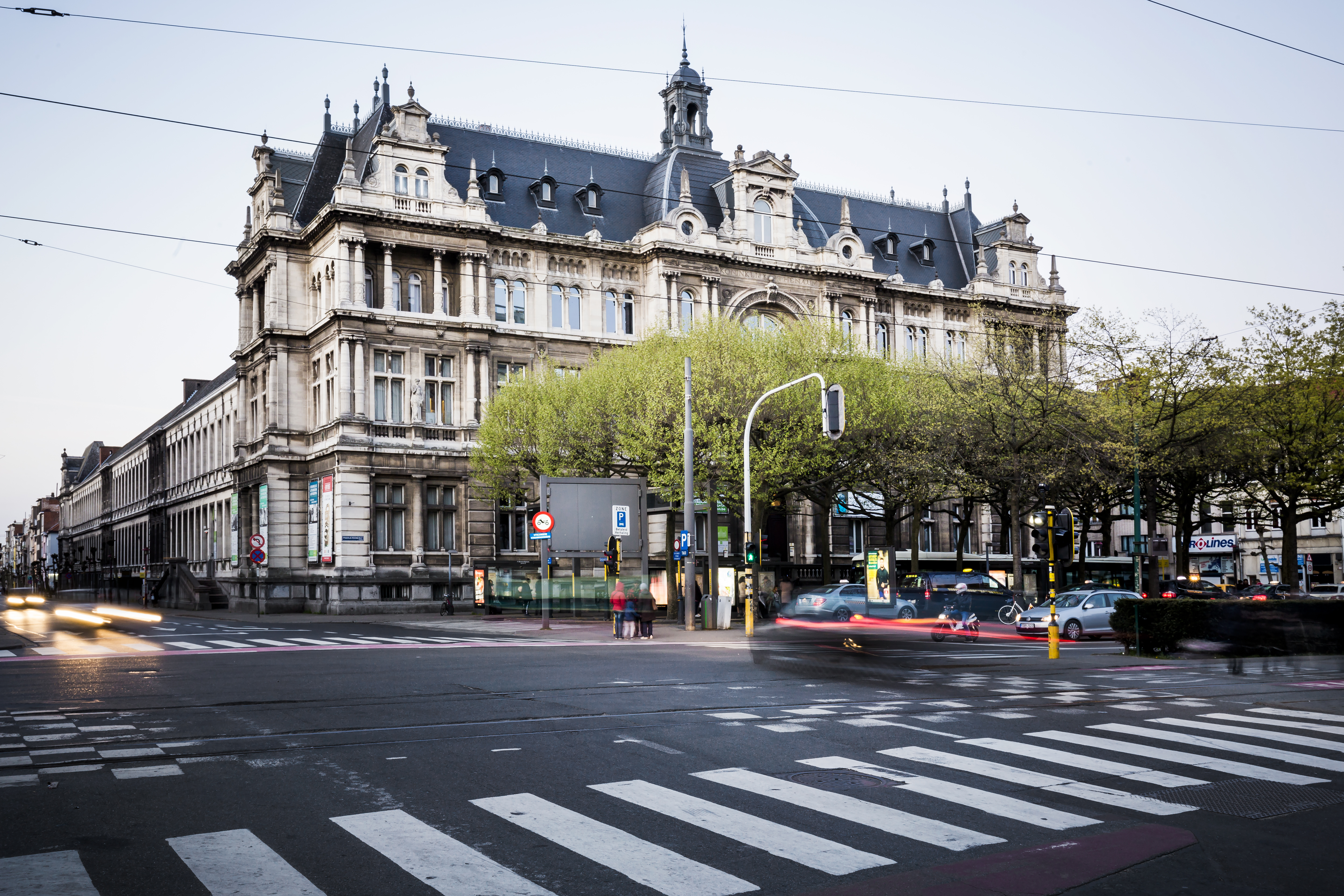
Royal Athenaeum

The Royal Athenaeum was built here in 1882-84. It was designed by Pieter Jan August Dens in collaboration with Ferdinand Truyman.

After the Allied victory in the First World War, the square was once again named the Victorieplaats, this time referring to the four main allied victors, France, the UK, the US and Italy. The square eventually received its present name after the Second World War, honoring the recently deceased American president Franklin D. Roosevelt.

== Public transport ==
Originally, the square had an imposing design, with statues and decoration with plants and intersected by the Leien and Turnhoutsebaan. However, due to its central position at the crossing of these two major axes, the square soon became a hub for public transport. Beginning in 1934, more and more vicinal trams of the NMVB started to have their terminus at the Victorieplaats. Gradually, the amount of space taken in by public transport rose, up until 1968 vicinal trams, later buses and city trams, operated by the MIVA, and after 1992 by De Lijn. As of 2017, the square is serviced by tram routes 10, 11, 12 and 24.

The square has functioned during the past decades as the absolute hub for city and regional bus lines in Antwerp, with 28 platforms that are serviced by busses going in any direction, as well as the above mentioned tram routes. Also, the square is within a short walking distance of the Opera premetro station to the South, and the Astridplein, also a hub for city public transport, and Antwerp-Central railway station to the East.

In recent years, efforts are being made to reduce the number of busses having their terminus at the Rooseveltplaats, in part to reduce bus traffic in the inner city as well as to relieve pressure on the Rooseveltplaats. In 2002, regional busses toward Waasland were limited to the Van Eeden square on Linkeroever. In 2012 several bus lines going North or South were either cancelled or limited to termini outside the city centre, and in 2015, the busses going eastward through Borgerhout were diverted to the bus station at Antwerpen-Berchem railway station. Starting from June 2017 furthermore, busses to Boom and Mechelen are limited to Antwerpen-Zuid. Also, international bus services such as Flixbus and IC Bus have largely moved to the nearby Astridplein.

== Future ==
Beginning in June 2017, large scale construction works will start on the Rooseveltplaats as a part of the larger Noorderlijn project. After the conclusion of these works, the number of bus platforms will be reduced from 28 to 12. At the same time, the square will get new tram connections after the construction of tram tracks on the northern part of the Leien. Also, the currently unused premetro tunnel between Astrid and Opera stations will be taken into service by tram routes 8 and 10.
