= Plantin =

Plantin may refer to:

== Printing and publishing ==
- Christophe Plantin (1520–1589), humanist, printer, and publisher
- Plantin (typeface)
- Plantin Press, 16th century Antwerp publisher
- Plantin-Moretus Museum, Antwerp
- Plantin Polyglot, a 16th century multilingual Bible

== Other meanings ==
- Plantin premetro station, Antwerp
- 6808 Plantin, asteroid
- Arabella Plantin, 18th-century British novelist

== See also ==
- Plantain (disambiguation), similar spelling
