= Zegel (Antwerp premetro station) =

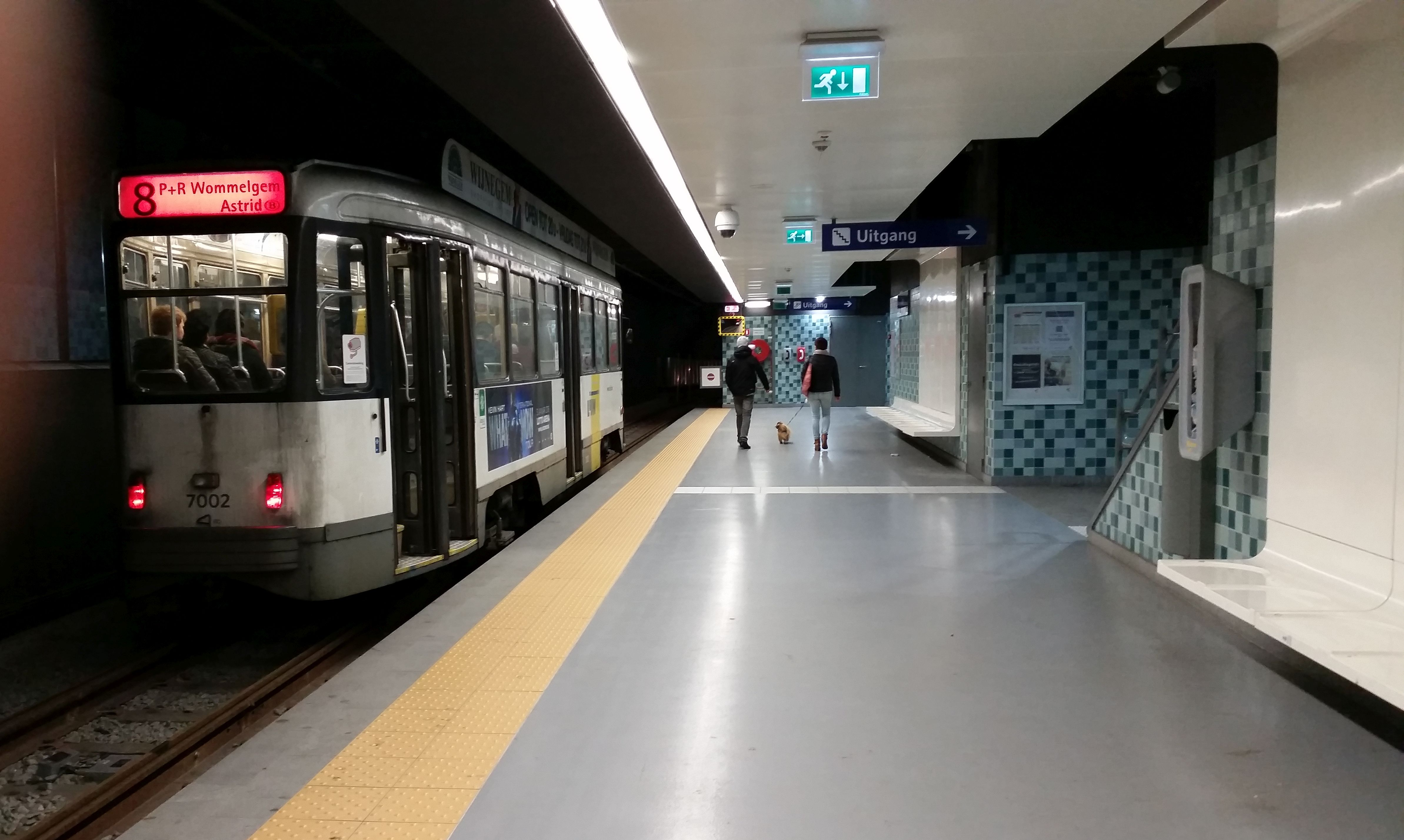

General information
- Location: Belgium
- Coordinates: 51°12′51″N 04°26′34″E
- Operator: De Lijn

Construction
- Structure type: underground
- Platform levels: 2

History
- Opened: 18 April 2015

Services
Preceding station	Antwerp tram	Following station
Astrid Terminus	Tram route 8	Muggenberg towards P+R Wommelgem
Astrid towards P+R Schoonselhof	Tram route 10	Hof Ter Lo towards Wijnegem
Location
- Location within the Antwerp premetro network

Zegel is a station on the Antwerp premetro network, opened on 18 April 2015. It lies under the Turnhoutsebaan near the crossing with the Sint-Jansstraat, in the Borgerhout district and is served by tram routes 8 and 10.

== Current situation ==
It is the last station in the eastern premetro tunnel before it splits into a northern and a more southerly trajectory. The station consequently has two 60-metre long platforms, lying one above the other, the deeper of which is for outward trams, away from the city centre.

The station can be entered by a 200-metre long entrance hall, and two above-ground entrances, one near the Zegelstraat crossing, the other near the Sint-Janstraat crossing.

== History ==
For more than thirty years, it was one of the ghost stations in the unopened eastern axis of the premetro network under the Carnotstraat and Turnhoutsebaan, also called the Reuzenpijp. Works started in 1977, but due to budgetary problems, construction works on the premetro tunnel had to be stopped in 1981, and could not be resumed in the following years, leaving the station unused, with most of its infrastructure already finished. The station was originally intended for use by routes 10 and 24, which used the above ground tracks on the Turnhoutsebaan.

On 3 April 2008, minister of public works Hilde Crevits answered in response to a parliamentary question from Ludwig Caluwé that either Drink or Zegel station would be opened as a part of the Pegasusplan, which included the opening of the eastern premetro axis between Astrid station and its southern entrance at the Herentalsebaan. Eventually, it was decided to open Zegel station, because of its better connection possibilities with other bus and tram routes in the local public transport network.

On 19 December 2012 the Flemish government ratified the LIVAN project, which included the opening of the eastern premetro tunnel, Zegel station, and an above ground tram extension to Wommelgem, to be financed as a public–private partnership, as proposed by minister of mobility and public works Hilde Crevits. In March 2013, works on the LIVAN project started.

On 18 April 2015, both the eastern premetro tunnel and Zegel station were officially opened. Since then the station has been served by the newly created tram route 8, running between Astrid station near Antwerp central station, and the Wommelgem P+R.

On 18 April 2017 tram route 10 joined route 8 in the Reuzenpijp. This was originally planned for 3 June, coinciding with the opening of the western tunnel entrance of the Reuzenpijp, but was sped up by growing delays due to major traffic works above ground.

Since 16 September 2017, the opening of the north-eastern tunnel entrance of the Reuzenpijp near Foorplein is used by route 10.
