= Franciscus van Hombeeck =

Belgian politician (1885–1907)

- Born: 1885
- Died: 1907 (aged 21–22)
- Occupations: politician, mayor

Franciscus van Hombeeck (1885–1907) was a Belgian politician. Van Hombeeck was mayor of the Flemish town of Berchem, next to Antwerp (and is now a district of Antwerp). During his political mandate, Berchem became a prosperous and wealthy community. One of Berchem's main squares is named after him.
