= Plantin premetro station =

Premetro station in Antwerp, Belgium

Plantin
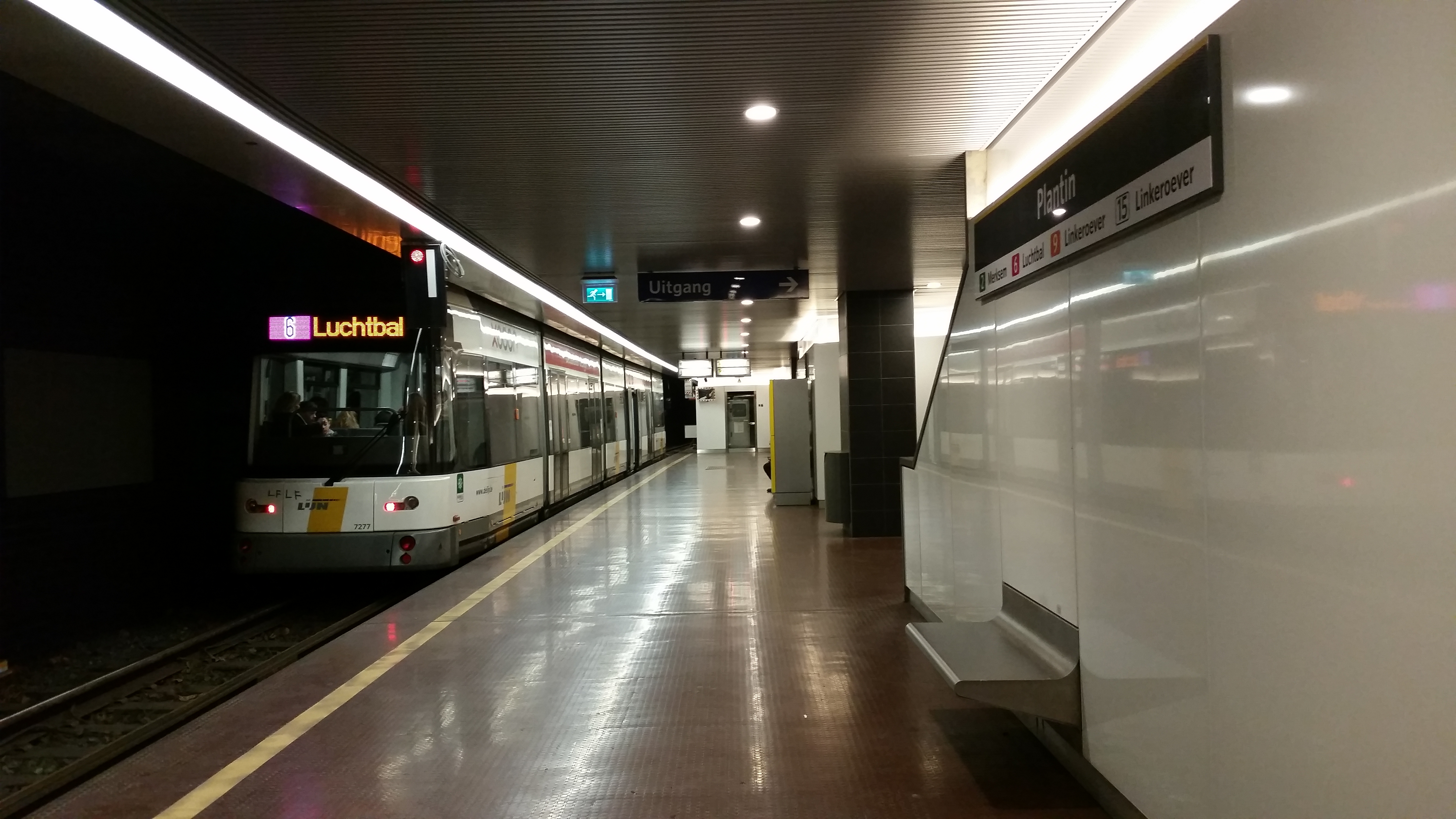

General information
- Coordinates: 51°12′38″N 4°25′19″E
- Owner: De Lijn
- Tracks: 2

Construction
- Structure type: Underground
- Platform levels: 2

History
- Opened: 10 March 1980

Services
Preceding station	Antwerp tram	Following station
Diamant towards P+R Merksem	Tram route 2	Lange Leemstraat towards Hoboken
Diamant towards P+R Luchtbal	Tram route 6	Lange Leemstraat towards P+R Olympiade
Diamant towards P+R Linkeroever	Tram route 9	Zurenborg towards P+R Wommelgem
Diamant towards Regatta	Tram route 15	Lange Leemstraat towards P+R Boechout
Location
- Location within the Antwerp premetro network

Plantin premetro station is an Antwerp premetro station. Located under the intersection of Simonsstraat with the Plantin en Moretuslei, it is served by lines 2, 6, 9, and 15.

Opened in 1980, the station reflects the 'richer' period of the MIVA - the Antwerp transport company which was later merged into De Lijn - and is decorated in marble. The layout consists of three levels, of which the first (-1) contains a ticket hall and four exits towards street level (corresponding to the intersection under which it lies). Level -2 comprises the platform serving northbound trains to Diamant, whilst Level -3 comprises the southbound platform towards the premetro tunnel exits at the Belgiëlei, used by routes 2, 6, and 15, and Mercatorstraat, used by route 9.

== See also ==
- Trams in Antwerp
