= Bal & Louis Meeùs =

Gin distillery in Belgium

Bal & Louis Meeùs (a.k.a. Distillerie Bal & L. Meeus) was a distillery in Antwerp formed after the 1959 merger of two earlier companies. The distillery operated until 2016.

== History ==
In 1957 Frans Hol and his wife took over Bal & Co. This company was formerly De Kroon distillery, which produced liqueurs and jenevers based on chemical infusions. Two years later Bal & Co. merged with the company Louis Meeùs and its associated distillery De Sleutel, whose liqueurs were based on herbs. The resulting company was named Bal & Louis Meeùs and it was originally located in Lamornièrestraat in Antwerp. Frans Hol stayed true to the traditions, recipes and methods of the distilleries he took over. His company's emblem was a fitting combination of the crown (Dutch: kroon) and key (Dutch: sleutel) of the acquired companies.

The growing success of the company over the next twenty years forced it to look for larger premises. In 1981, a suitable location was found on Autolei in Wommelgem.

Bal & Louis Meeùs operated until 2016, when Vinoherck took over the stocks, brands, trademarks and distilled beverage recipes in Bal & Louis Meeùs's portfolio. In 2024 Vinoherck is still active.

== Products ==
The company produced a varied assortment of Antwerp jenevers, among them:

- De Oude Beste: a fine jenever, made from top quality grains. Distilled since 1894, it had been awarded the highest distinction at the Antwerp International Exhibition.
- De Witte Bitter: a fine, bitter gin that had its origins in a formula that W. Grube devised in Borgerhout in 1835.
- De Zuivere Oude: a grain jenever acquired from the company Bal & Co.

Although jenevers were their primary product, Bal & Louis Meeùs also produced a variety of other alcoholic beverages. Liqueurs, such as different types of curacao and cherry brandy, for instance. The company also had a selection of cognacs, rum and a varied assortment of wines.
