= Antwerp (district) =

Antwerp District
- District of Antwerp
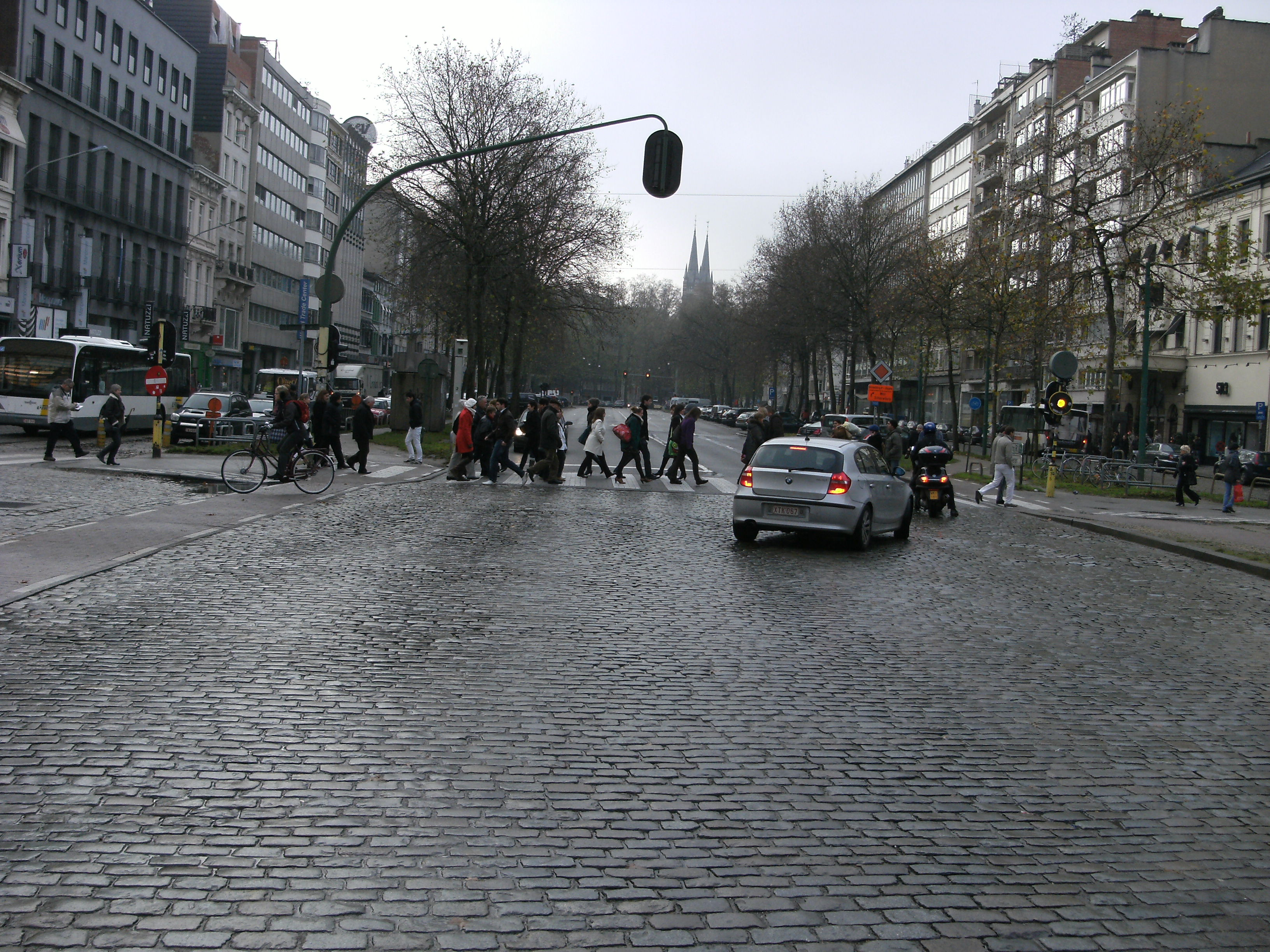

- Flag Coat of arms
- Interactive map of Antwerp District
- Location within Belgium Location within Antwerp Province
- Coordinates: 51°13′14″N 4°23′59″E
- Country: Belgium
- Community: Flemish Community
- Region: Flemish Region
- Province: Antwerp
- Arrondissement: Antwerp
- Municipality: Antwerp

Area
  - Total: 87.3 km^{2} (33.7 sq mi)

Population (2025-01-01)
  - Total: 205,311
  - Density: 2,350/km^{2} (6,090/sq mi)
- Postal codes: 2000, 2018, 2020, 2030, 2050, 2060
- Area codes: 03

Antwerp District coincided with the city of Antwerp until 1958. Since the municipality and contemporary city of Antwerp in the Flemish Region of Belgium was decentralized in 2000, this district level of government steadily increased its administrative powers.

It comprises 22 neighbourhoods:

- Antwerpen Noord (with Stuivenberg, Seefhoek, Amandus-Atheneum, Chinatown)
- Brederode
- Centraal Station (with Kievitwijk, Diamant, Statiekwartier, Joods Antwerpen)
- Den Dam
- Eilandje
- Haringrode
- Harmonie
- Historisch Centrum
- Kiel
- Linkeroever
- Luchtbal-Rozemaai-Schoonbroek (with Luchtbal, Rozemaai, Schoonbroek)
- Markgrave
- Meir
- Middelheim
- Schipperskwartier
- Sint-Andries
- Stadspark
- Tentoonstellingswijk
- Theaterbuurt, also called Quartier Latin
- Universiteitswijk
- Zurenborg
- Zuid, also called Zuid - Museum
