= Chicagoblok =

Block of flats in Antwerp, Belgium

Coordinates: 51.2255°N 4.382°E

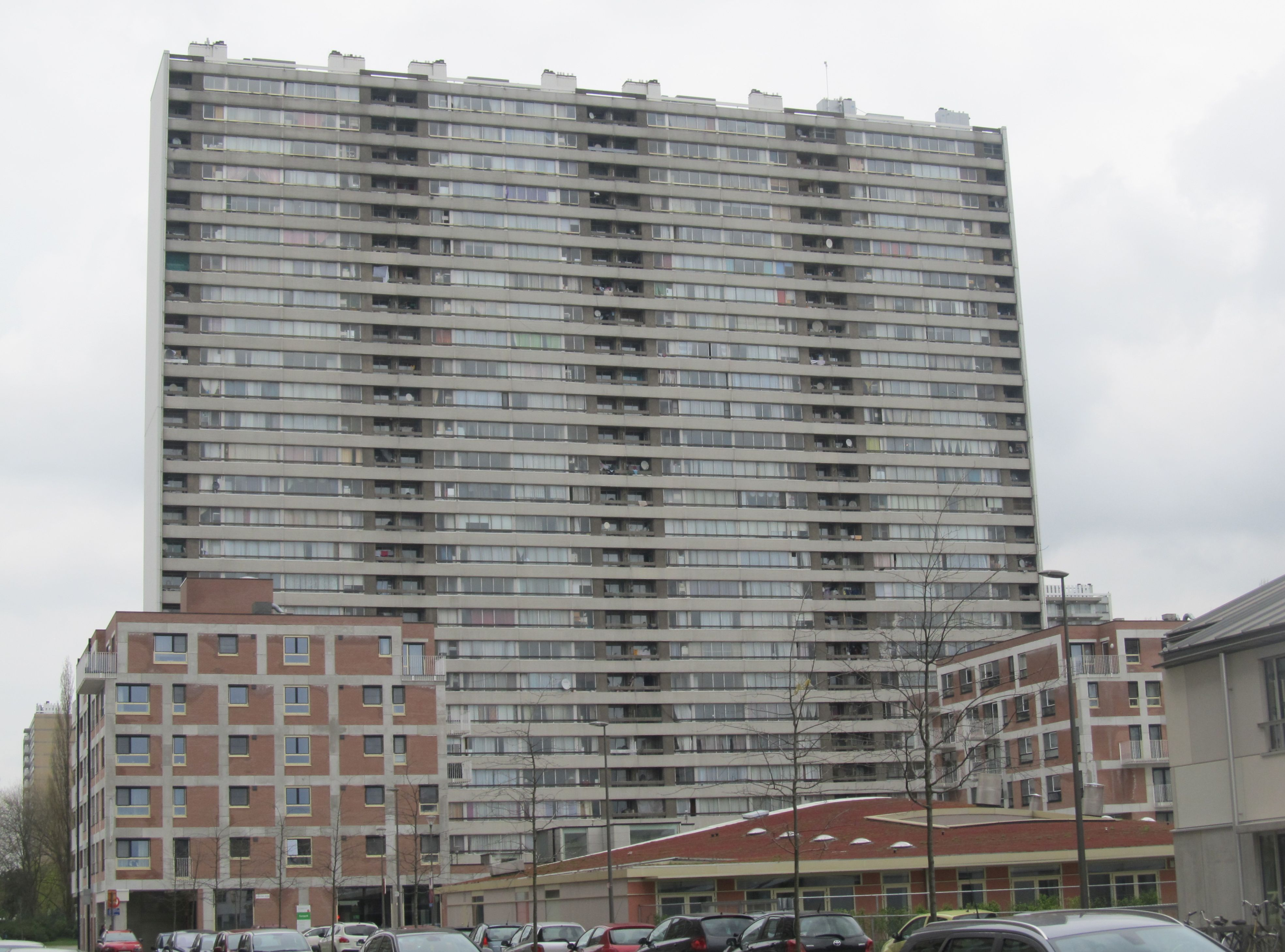
Chicagoblok.

The Chicagoblok (Also known as the Europark) is a block of flats in the district of Linkeroever, Antwerp.
