= Antwerpen-Linkeroever railway station =

Railway station in Antwerp, Belgium

Antwerpen-Linkeroever
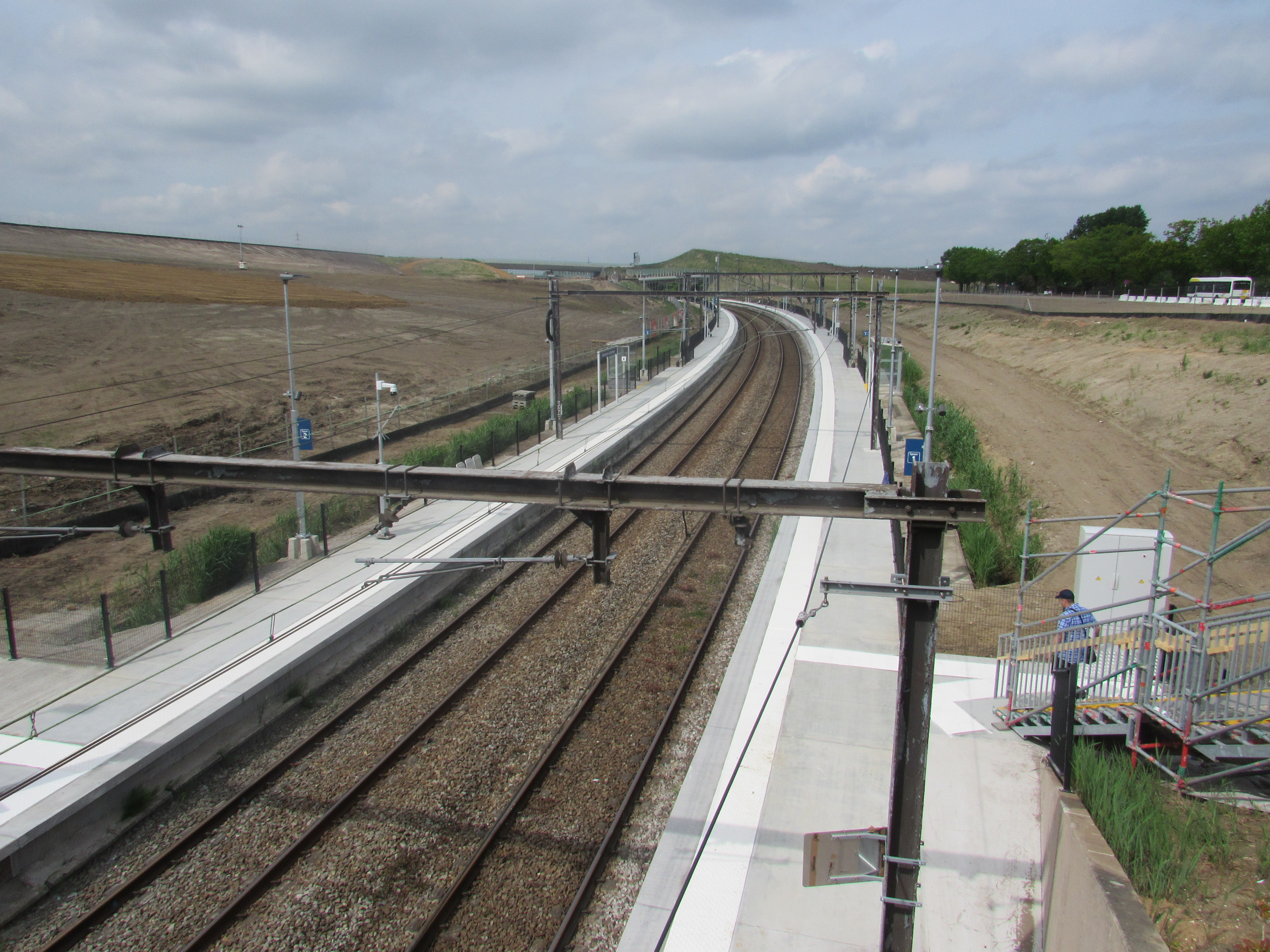

General information
- Location: Linkeroever, Antwerp; Belgium
- Coordinates: 51°12′57″N 4°21′28″E
- Owner: NMBS
- Line: Line 59 Antwerp-Ghent
- Tracks: 2

Other information
- Station code: FLO (previously FTF)

History
- Opened: 2 May 2026
Location

Antwerpen Linkeroever is the name of two different historical railway stations located on line 59 Antwerp-Ghent, in the Linkeroever area, Antwerp. The station was reopened again in 2026.

The station has temporarily reopened until March 2027 to act as a partial replacement service for tram line 5, which does not currently serve Linkeroever due to renovation works.

== History ==
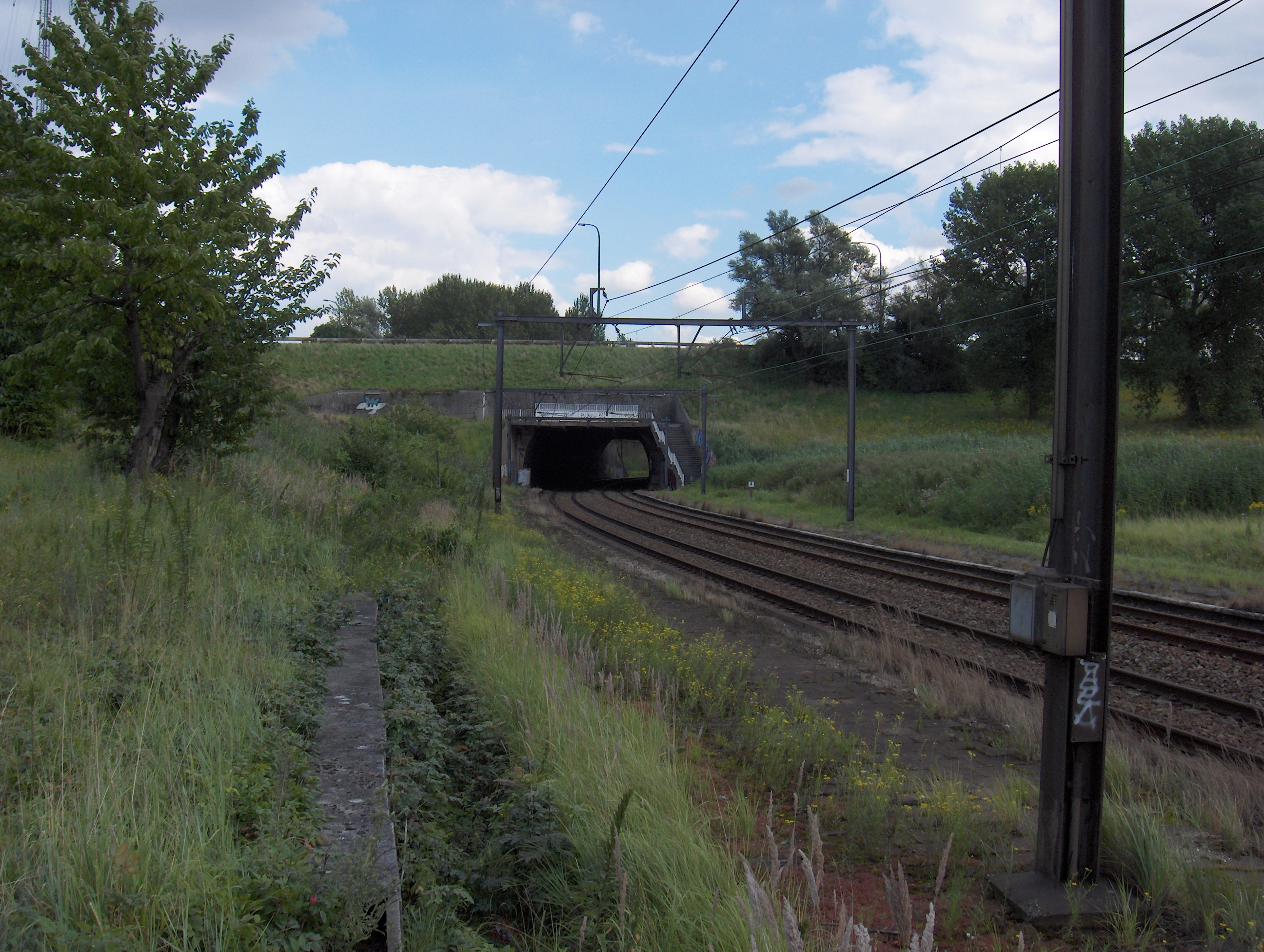
Antwerpen-Linkeroever in 2008

The oldest station to be constructed at the location was opened on 3 November 1844 as station Vlaams Hoofd. After the annexation of the village of Vlaams-Hoofd by Antwerp in the name changed to station Antwerpen-West. There was also a ferry connection available to Antwerpen-Waas station on the right bank side of the river Scheldt. After the opening of the St.-Annatunnel in 1933, the station was renovated in 1935 and renamed station Antwerpen-Linkeroever. This station at the Beatrijslaan was ultimately closed on 1 February 1970, being replaced by a new station located more to the West at the Katwilgweg. This second station was finally taken out of service on 3 June 1984 due to low usage. Of the newer station, some remnants still remain in the form of two low-lying and derelict platforms located near the present building of the Gazet van Antwerpen.

The station was reopened on 2 May 2026, for a temporary period until March 2027, to serve as a replacement service during renovation works of the Antwerp pre-metro.
