= Ferdinand Truyman =

Belgian architect

Ferdinand Truyman(1857–1939) was a Belgian architect well known for his Art Nouveau building designs. He was active particularly in Antwerp.

== Gallery ==
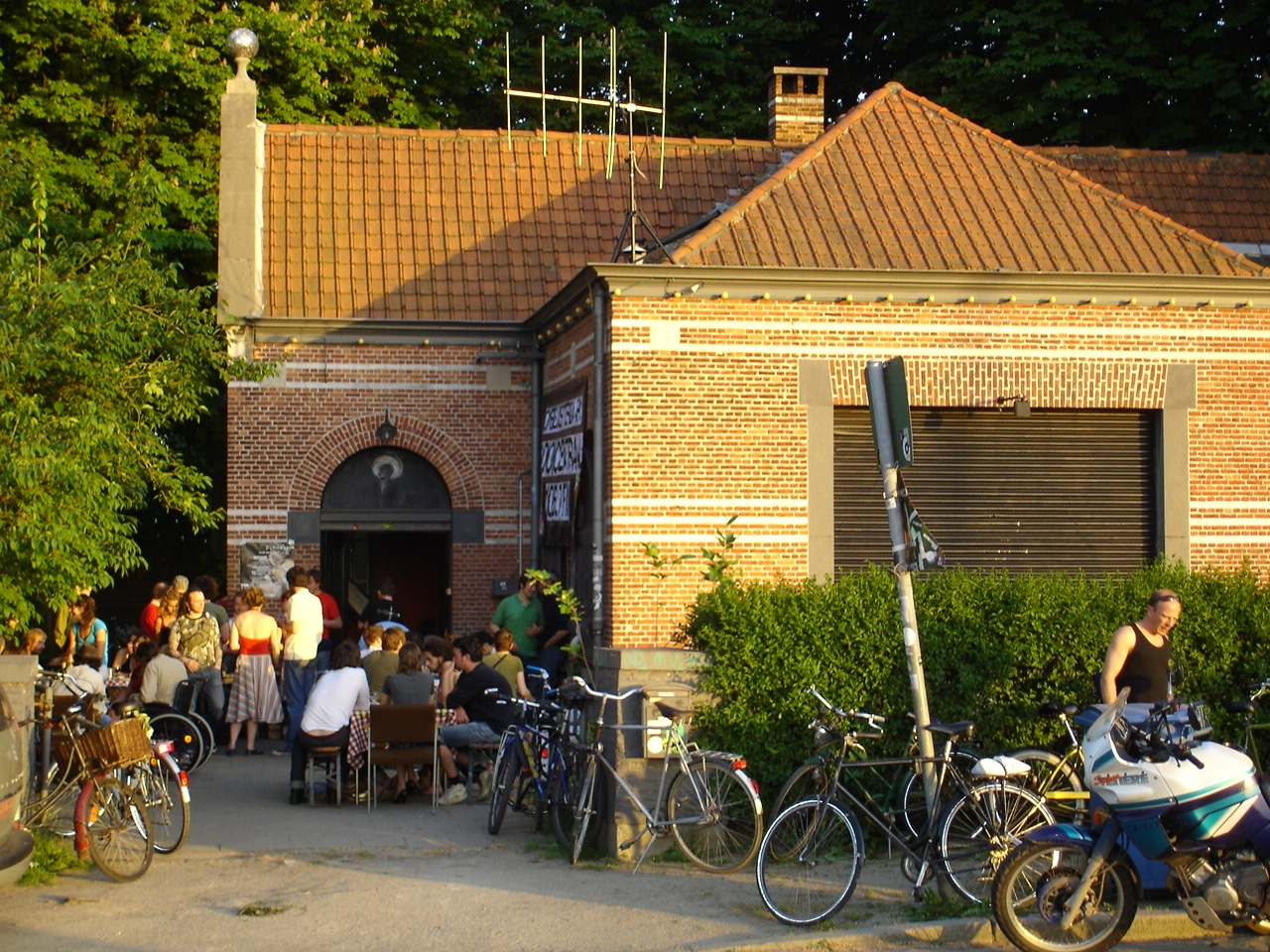
Firebriage HQ (1911), d'Herbouvillekaai, Antwerp

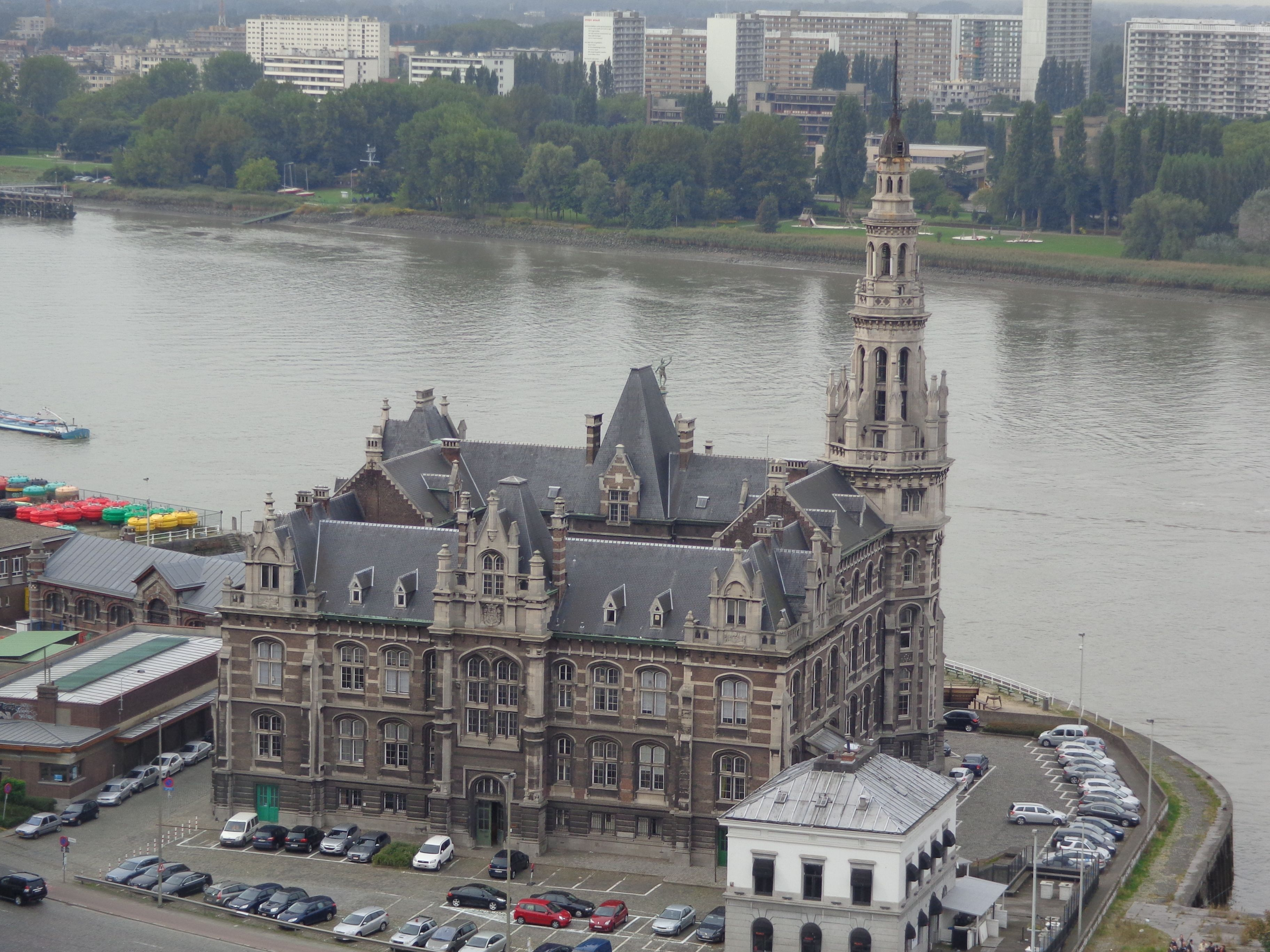
Loodswezen (pilotage), Port of Antwerp

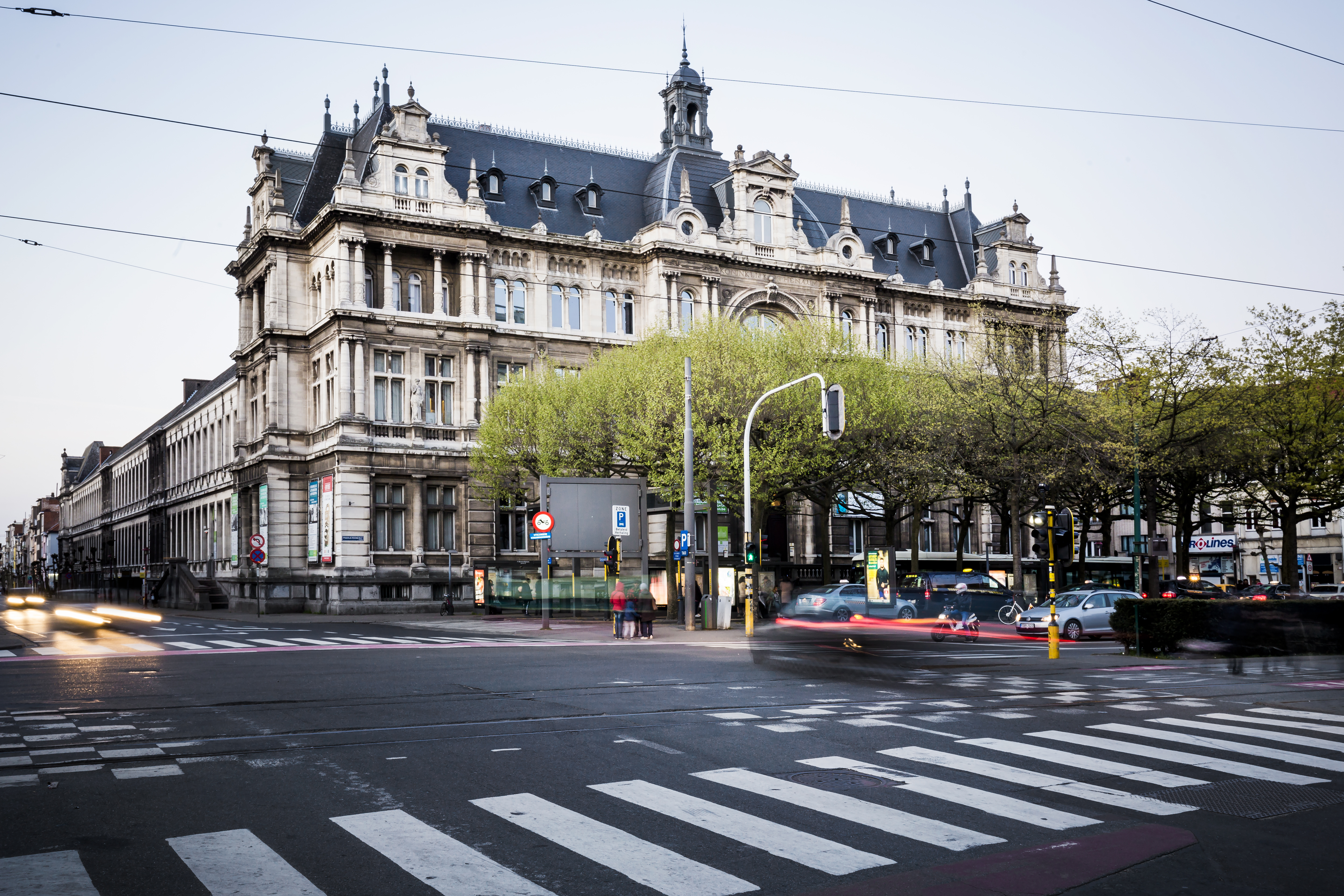
Royal Atheneum, Franklin Rooseveltplaats, Antwerp
