= Meir, Antwerp =

Main shopping street in Antwerp, Belgium

Meir
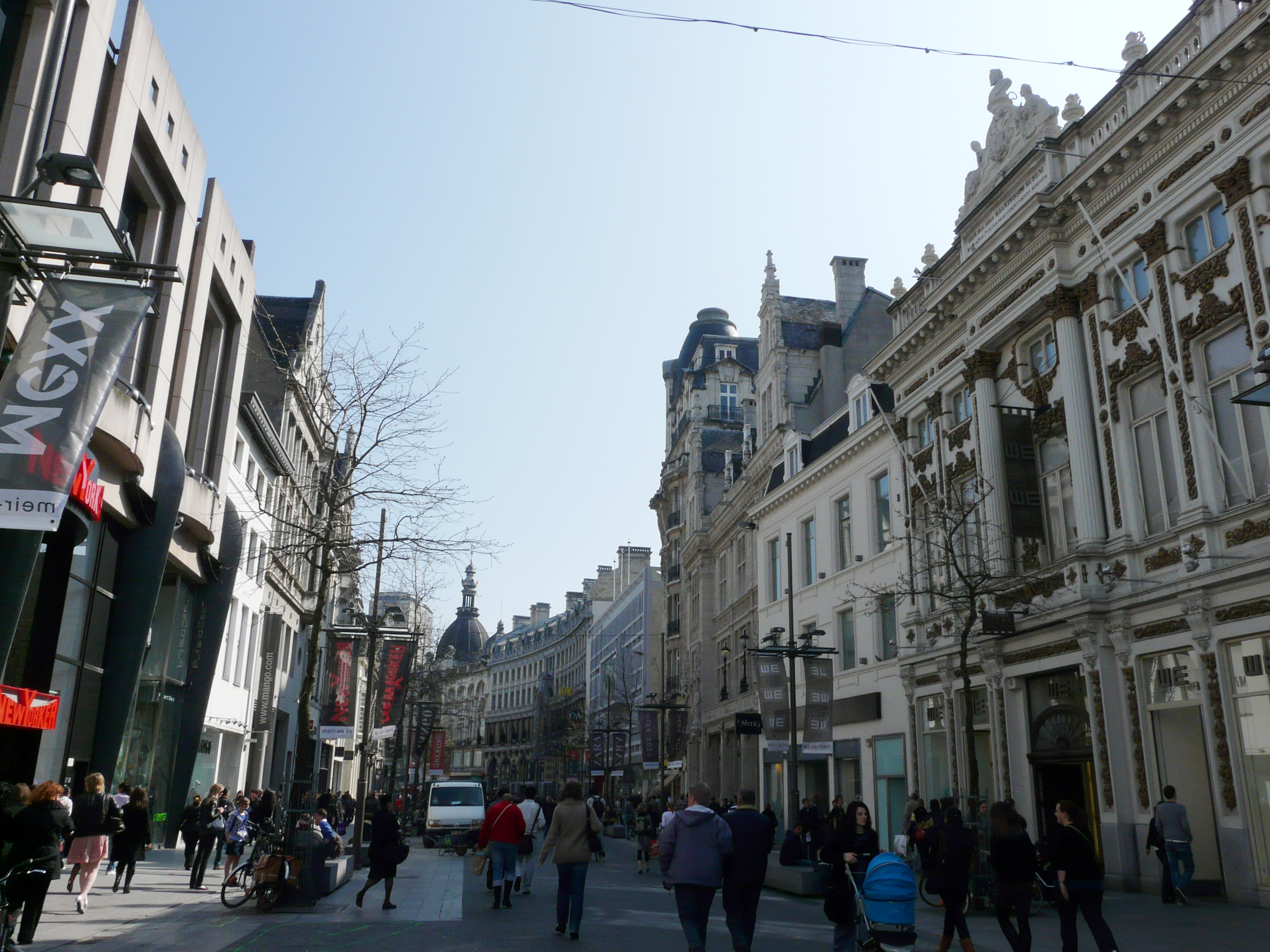
- Meir shopping street
- Interactive map of Meir
- Namesake: From "meer" (lake)
- Length: 700 m (2,300 ft)
- Location: Antwerp
- Postal code: 2000
- Nearest metro station: Meir
- Coordinates: 51°13′5″N 4°24′31″E
- West end: Meirbrug
- East end: Teniersplaats

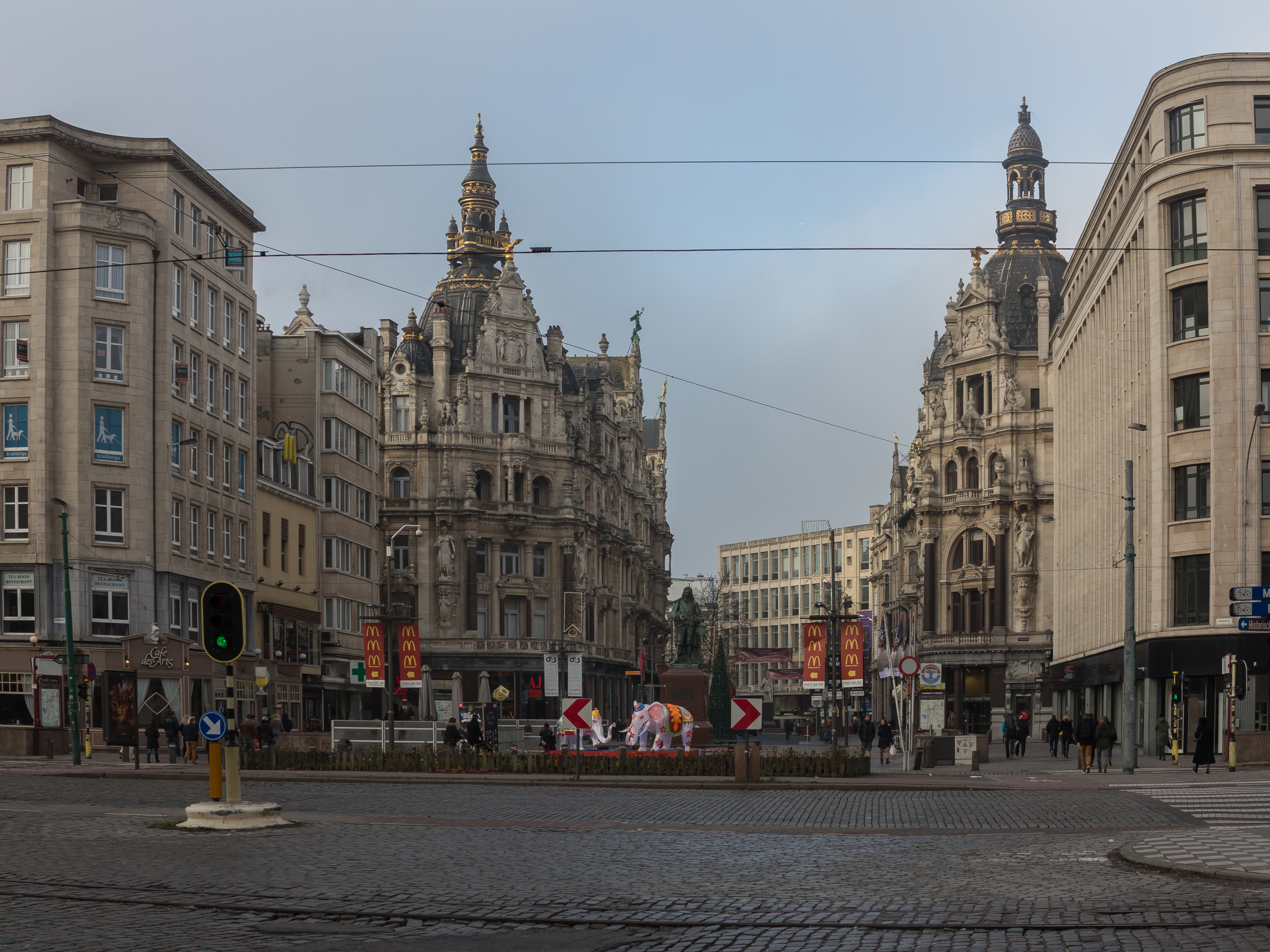
The Meir

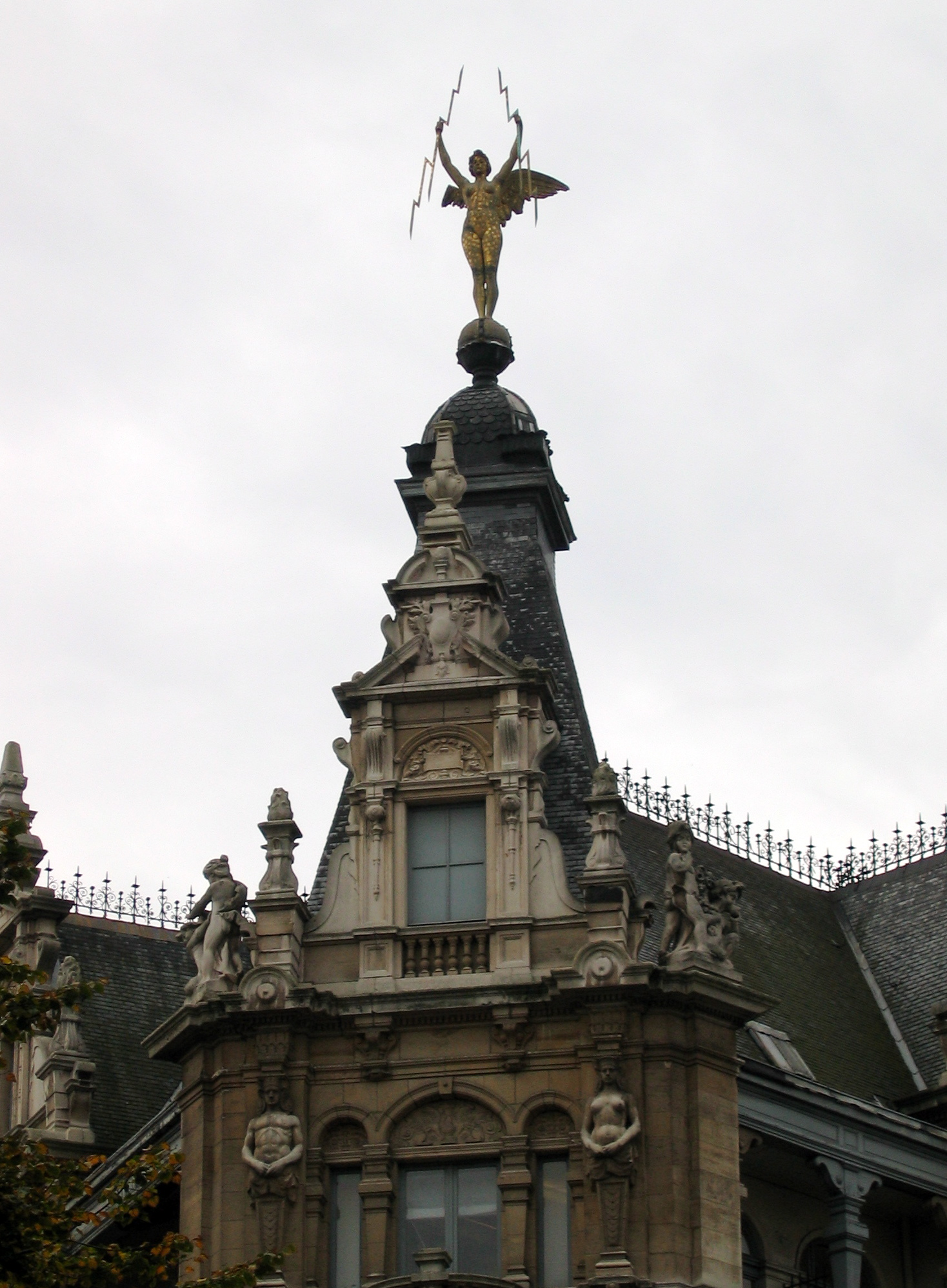
Angelic figure, poised high above the street, Meir and Jesusstraat.

Meir is the main shopping street in Antwerp, Belgium. It is the most important shopping area in the country, both by number of shoppers and by rent prices. The street has been mostly pedestrianised since 1993 and is said to be the Belgian equivalent to New York's 5th Avenue.

In the centre of Antwerp, Meir connects the Antwerp City Hall with the trains at Antwerp Central Station.

Between 2002 and 2004, it was the most expensive shopping street in the Benelux. Since the opening of the historic Stadsfeestzaal shopping centre in 2007, Meir regained that position. It has the highest rents of any street in Belgium, at 1,700 €/square metre/year.

The name comes from the old Dutch word "meere" (lake). Meir used to be a so-called "wood lake" (houtmeer), where wood destined for use in furniture would be kept wet for a time.

== Historical buildings ==
- Meir 50: Royal Residence, built in 1745, served as the Antwerp residence of the Kings of Belgium.
- Meir 85: Osterrieth House, built in 1746 in full rococo style.

== Surroundings ==
- Bourla Theatre, Neoclassical theatre built in 1827 and 1834 by architect Pierre Bruno Bourla.
- Antwerp Central Station, completed 1905 in an eclectic style.
- Antwerp City Hall, completed 1564, in Flemish-Italian Renaissance style.
- Trading Exchange, reconstruction of one of the world's first stock exchanges built in 1531.
- Rubens House, historical home of the painter Peter Paul Rubens.
