= Den Dam =

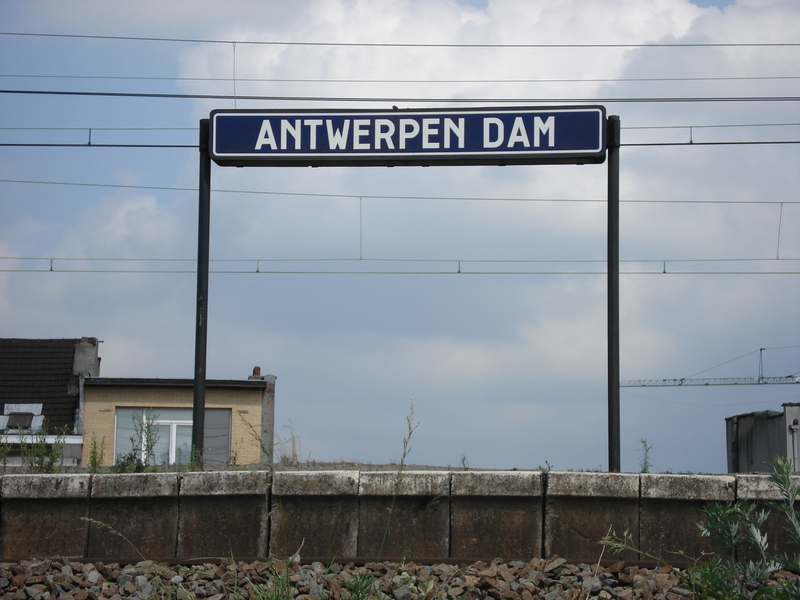
Antwerpen Dam Station

Den Dam is an area in northern Antwerp.

== Location ==
Den Dam is located in the northern part of Antwerp. On the north side it is bordered by the Slachthuislaan (the Antwerp inner ringroad), by an old disused railroad bedding on the south. It stretches all the way from "de Schijnpoort" in the east to "het Eilandje" on the western side. As such it is isolated from other areas in town, causing residents to regard themselves somewhat as outsiders compared to other Antwerp inhabitants.

== History ==
Historically, economic activities on Den Dam have revolved around the old abattoirs.

== Recent renovations ==
Lately many renovations have been done to Den Dam, including new road surfaces, new footpaths and the renovation of the central square ("het Damplein"). Next to the square there was a large terrain that was owned by the Belgian Railroads for repairing and maintenance of trains. In 2001 the city of Antwerp bought the grounds and started the renovation project. The buildings on the terrain were removed and the grounds were cleaned. The whole terrain is now 24 acres (97,000 m^{2}) large and has been transformed into a big new parc, as a new green lung of the city, called Park Spoor Noord (Northern Rail Parc).

On 24 November 2009 the new BMX and Skatebowl opened; on 25 May 2009 the west side of the parc was opened; it contains a very large grass zone, with walking paths, bicycle roads, kiosks, playgrounds; the map shows you the entire parc; the west side divided by the road was opened.

Map of the parc

At the end of 2009, the eastern section was also opened. The parc then also contains some basketball fields, petanque fields, fountains and ponds. There will also be a hall for all kinds of events. Some apartment buildings will be built on the edge of the parc.

More information (in Dutch)

== Venues ==
Filet d'Anvers and La Volpe

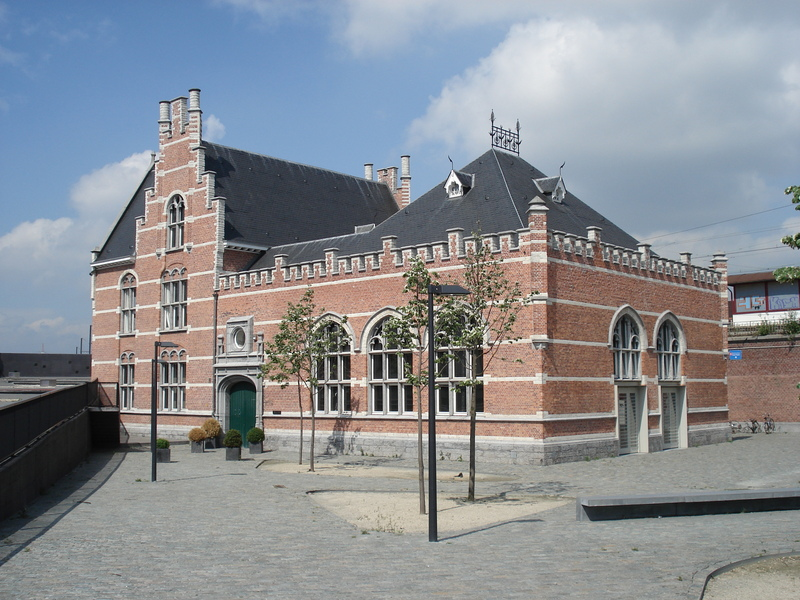
The old Dam station that now houses D-Club

Many restaurants have set up shop next to the abbatoirs, promoting themselves as selling the best meat in Antwerp. Most of the restaurants specialise in meat and buy their supplies directly from the abbatoirs. Well-known restaurants include:

- De Veehandel
- Filet d'Anvers
- La Volpe / El Zorro
- Petit Paris Services
- Piétrain

Also, a new nightclub called D-Club recently opened in the renovated station building.
