= Van Wesenbekestraat =

Street in Antwerp, Belgium

Coordinates: 51°13′11″N 4°25′15″E

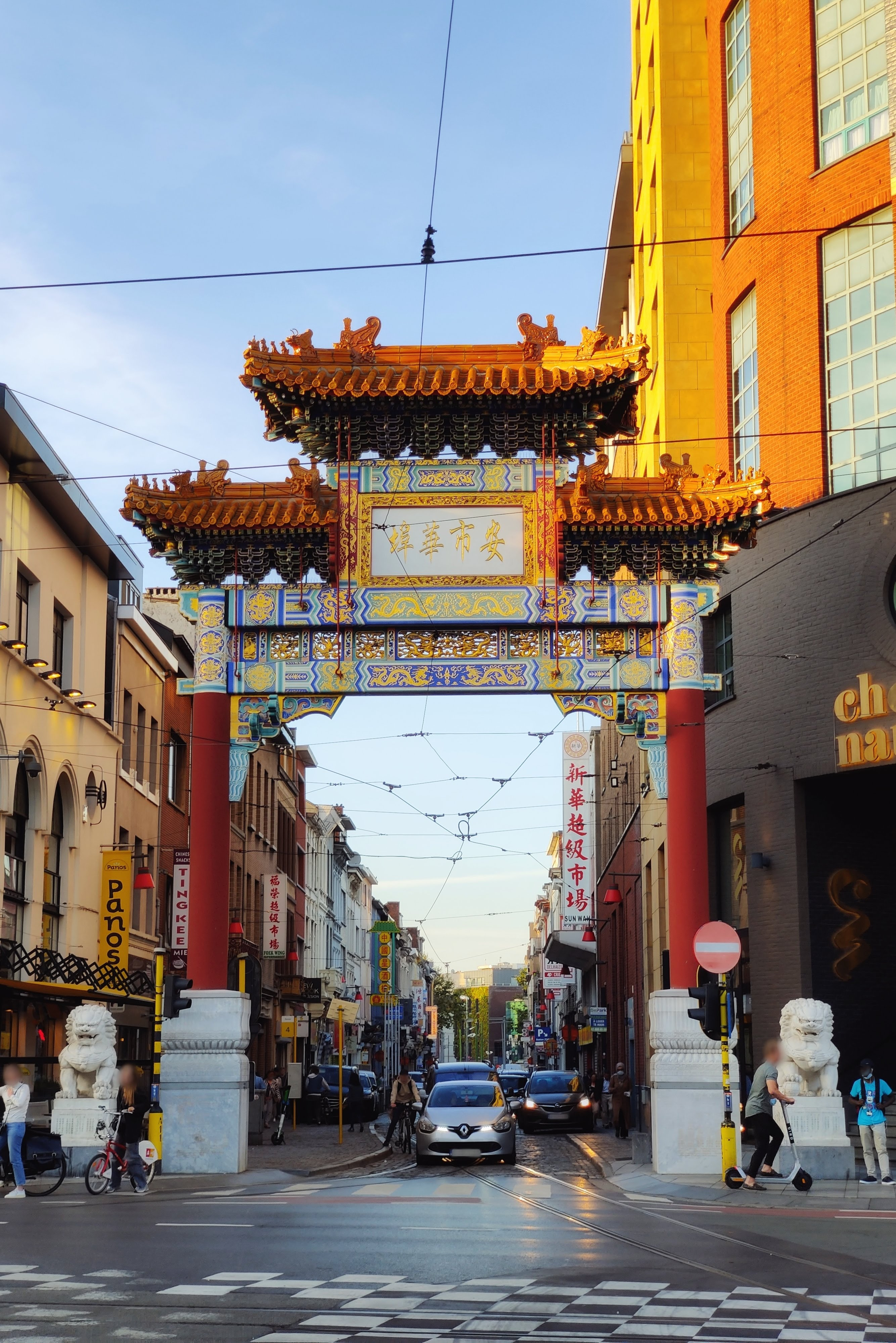
- Chinatown, Antwerp
- Traditional Chinese: 安特衛普唐人街 / 安市唐人街 / 安市華埠
- Simplified Chinese: 安特卫普唐人街 / 安市唐人街 / 安市华埠
- Literal meaning: Antwerpen Chinatown
Transcriptions
Standard Mandarin
- Hanyu Pinyin: āntèwèipǔ tángrénjiē / ānshì tángrénjiē / ānshì huábù
Yue: Cantonese
- Yale Romanization: ōn dahk waih póu tòhng yàhn gāai / ōn síh tòhng yàhn gāai / ōn síh wàh fauh
- Jyutping: on1 dak6 wai6 pou2 tong4 jan4 gaai1 / on1 si5 tong4 jan4 gaai1 / on1 si5 waa4 fau6
- Hong Kong Romanisation: On Tak Wai Po Tong Yan Kai / On Si Tong Yan Kai / On Si Wah Fau

Chinatown is located on Van Wesenbekestraat, a street in Antwerp, Belgium. Historically supporting the Chinese community that settled in Antwerp post-World War II, today Chinatown is well known for its pan-Asian atmosphere. The district houses an abundance of restaurants offering a variety of Asian cuisines such as Chinese, Japanese, Indian, Pakistani, Thai and Nepali. Pan-Asian organisations and businesses supporting the Chinese, Nepali, Indonesian and Filipino communities for example are found throughout the district, and the biggest Asian supermarket in the country (named Sun Wah which stocks items from China, Thailand, Japan, Korea, Taiwan, Philippines, Malaysia, Singapore, Vietnam, Indonesia and India) is also found in Chinatown. A Buddhist temple and a school for mastering kungfu are other commodities also found in the district. Chinese presence is still dominant. However, traders from Thailand, Nepal and other Asian countries have also settled in the district resulting in some dubbing it as Asiatown to reflect the changing demographics. Both at the entrance and the end of the street, two Chinese lions guard the street. A paifang known as the "Pagodepoort" (Pagoda Gate) was erected at the southern entrance to the street in 2010 after four years of planning.

== Gallery ==
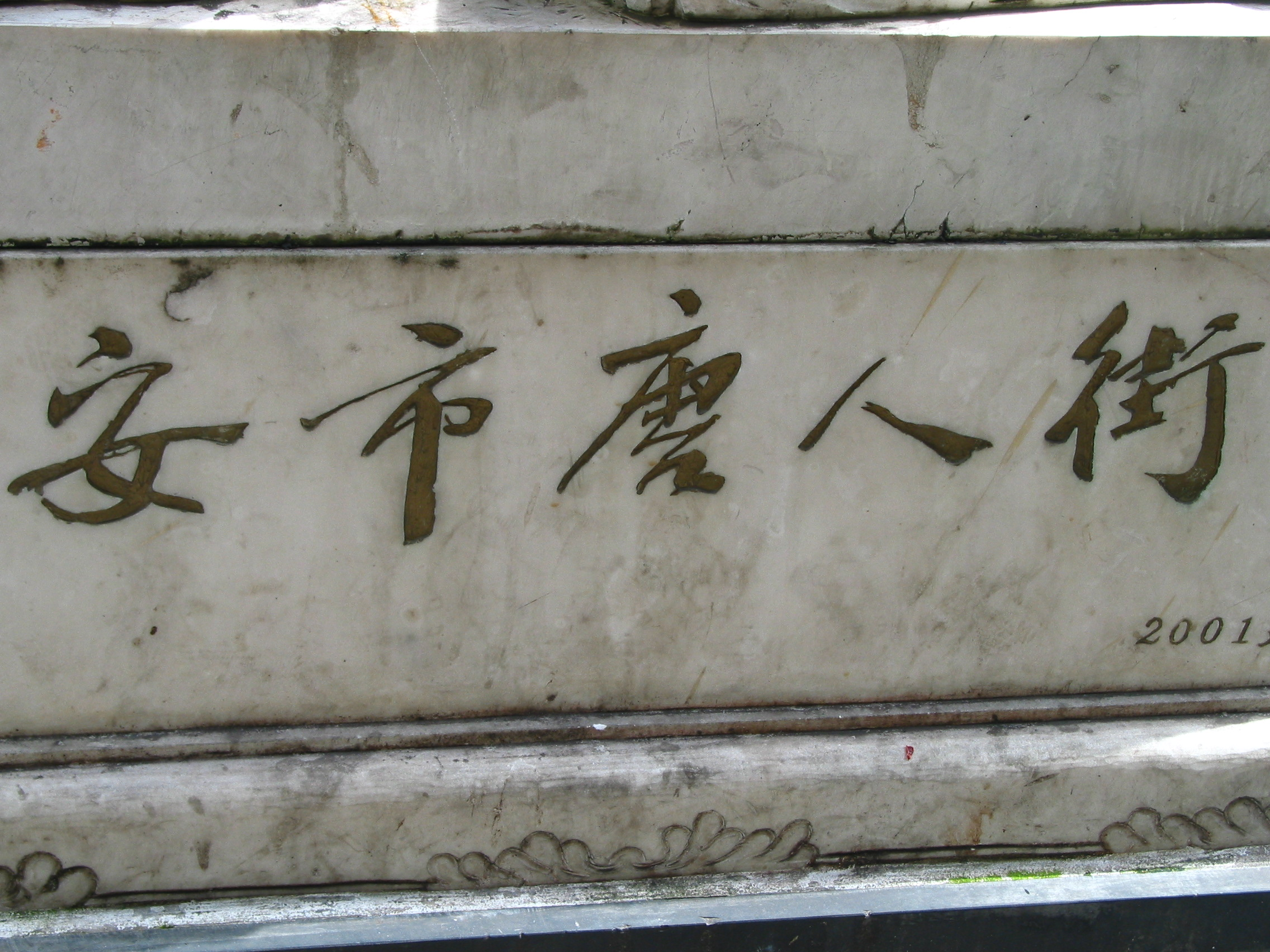
Text "安市唐人街" in the corner of a Chinese lion

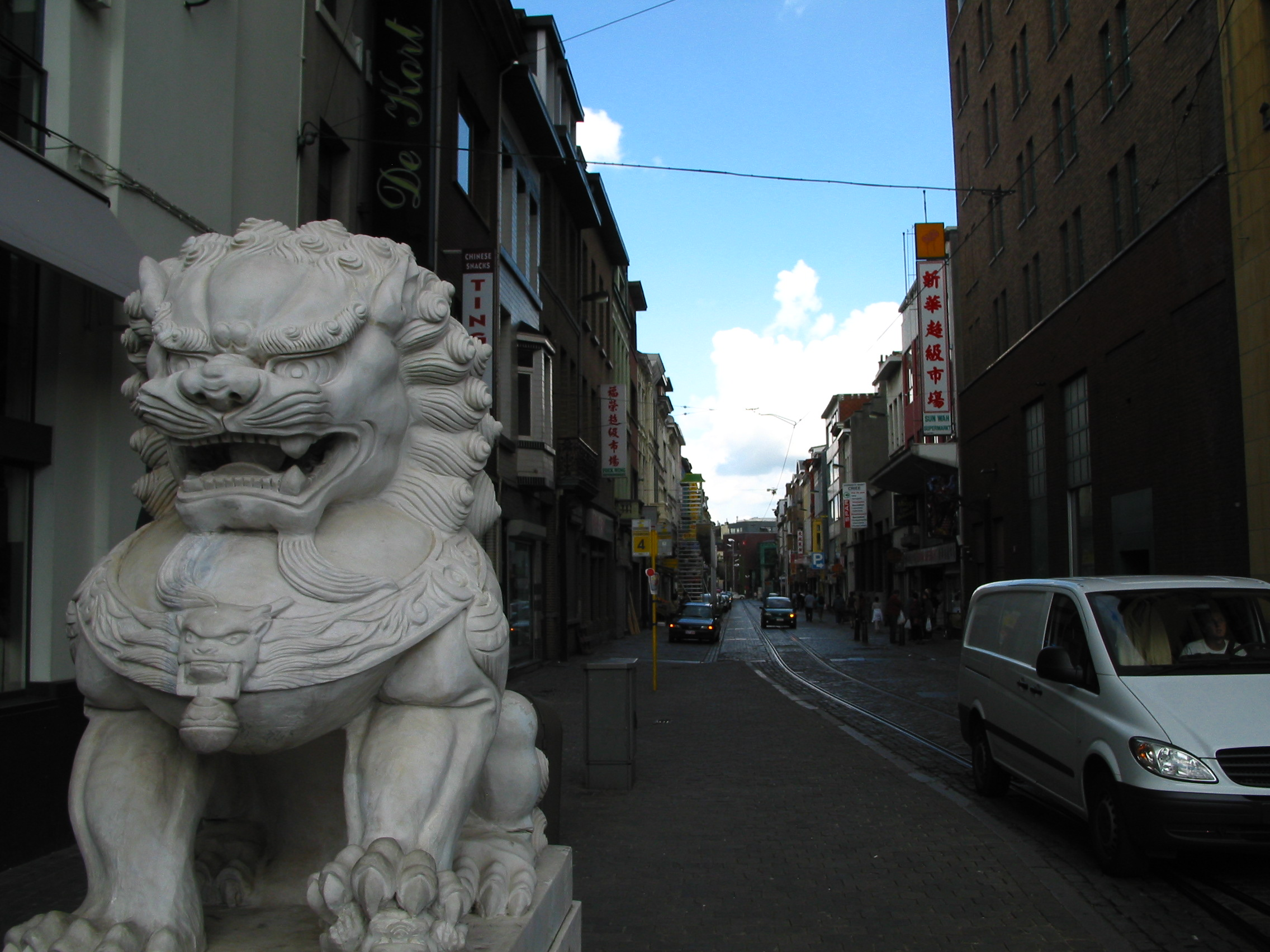
The south side of the Van Wesenbekestraat before 2010

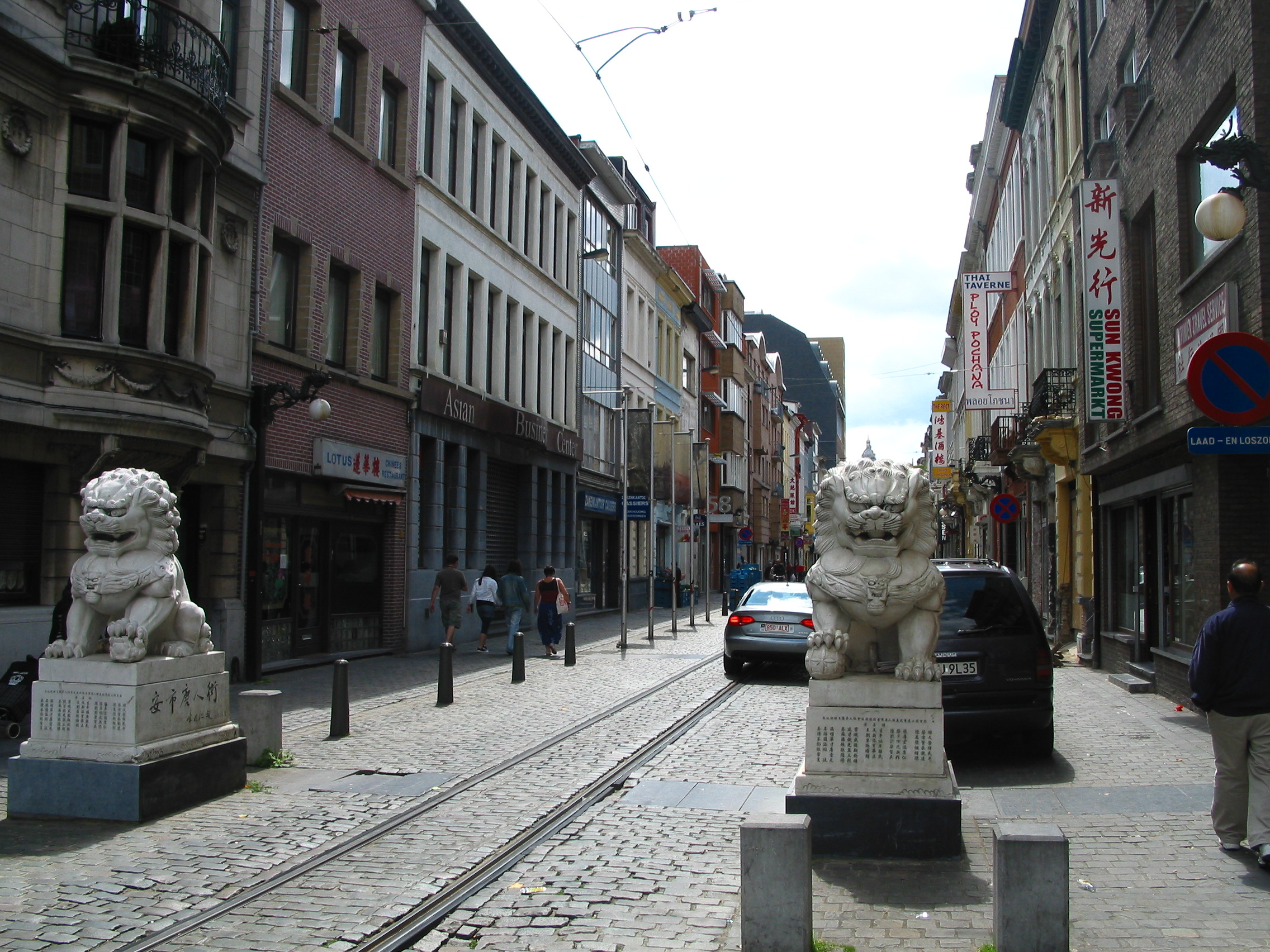
The north side of the Van Wesenbekestraat

Chinatown, Antwerp
