= Wommelgem =

- Municipality
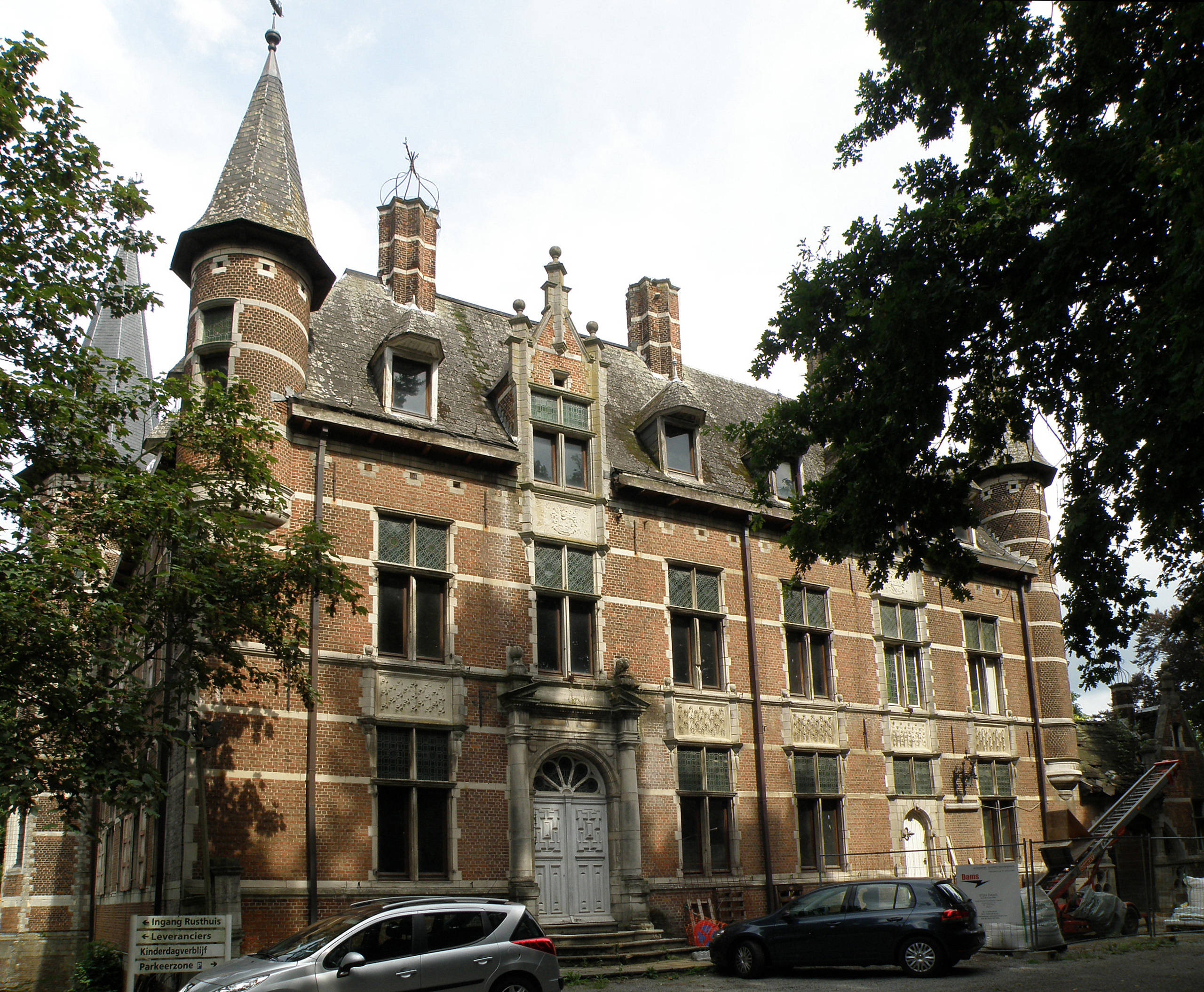
- Selsaete castle in Wommelgem

- Flag Coat of arms

- Location of Wommelgem in the province of Antwerp
- Interactive map of Wommelgem
- Location in Belgium
- Coordinates: 51°12′N 04°31′E
- Country: Belgium
- Community: Flemish Community
- Region: Flemish Region
- Province: Antwerp
- Arrondissement: Antwerp

Government
  - Mayor: Frank Gys (N-VA)
  - Governing parties: N-VA, Open Vld

Area
  - Total: 12.99 km^{2} (5.02 sq mi)

Population (2018-01-01)
  - Total: 12,893
  - Density: 992.5/km^{2} (2,571/sq mi)
- Postal codes: 2160
- NIS code: 11052
- Area codes: 03
- Website: www.wommelgem.be

Wommelgem (Dutch pronunciation: [ˈʋɔməlɣɛm]) is a municipality located in the Belgian province of Antwerp. The municipality only comprises the town of Wommelgem proper. In 2021, Wommelgem had a total population of 12,991. The total area is 13.01 km^{2}.

== Economy ==
Wommelgem is one of 25 municipalities within the Albert Canal economic network (Economisch Netwerk Albertkanaal).

The hardware store-chain Hubo Belgium is headquartered in Wommelgem.
