= Linkeroever =

Area in Antwerp, Belgium

- District
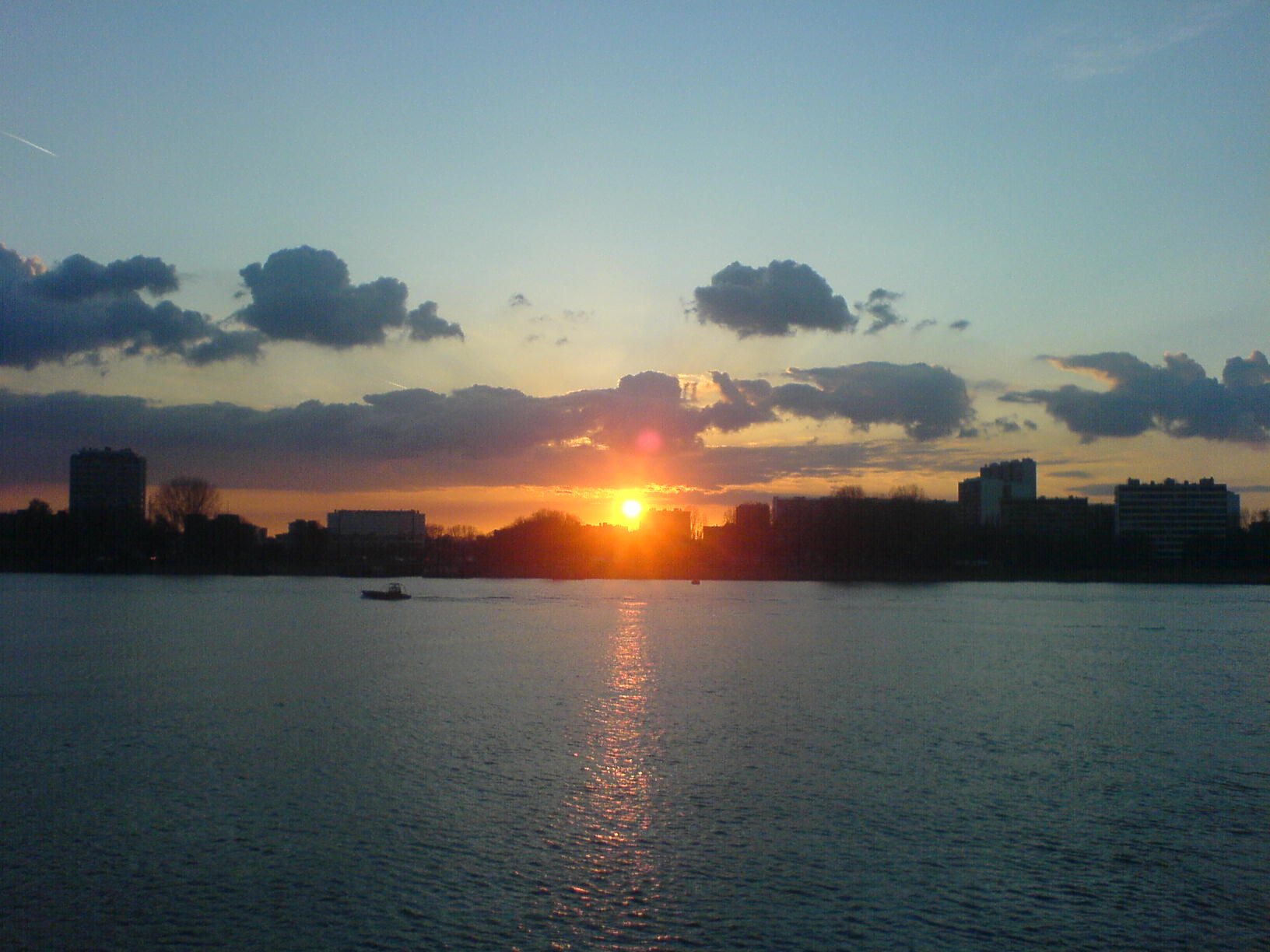
- Linkeroever at sunset, seen from Antwerp across the river Scheldt

- Location in Belgium
- Coordinates: 51°13′25″N 4°22′25″E
- Country: Belgium
- Region: Flemish Region
- Province: Antwerp
- Municipality: Antwerp

Area
  - Total: 10.11 km^{2} (3.90 sq mi)

Population (2021)
  - Total: 16,545
  - Density: 1,636/km^{2} (4,239/sq mi)
- Time zone: CET

Linkeroever (Literal translation: Left bank) is an area in the city of Antwerp, on the left bank of the Scheldt river. Historically it was a neighbourhood which belonged to Zwijndrecht, but on 19 March 1923, it was attached to Antwerp. Linkeroever has a population of 16,545 (2021). Before receiving its current name the area was known as "Borger Weert Polder".

== Notable buildings in Linkeroever ==
- Chicagoblok (Europark)

== See also ==
- Antwerpen-Linkeroever, a now defunct railway station in service between 1844 and 1984.
