= Palace of Justice, Antwerp =

Court building in Antwerp, Belgium

Palace of Justice of Antwerp
- Justitiepaleis Antwerpen (Dutch)
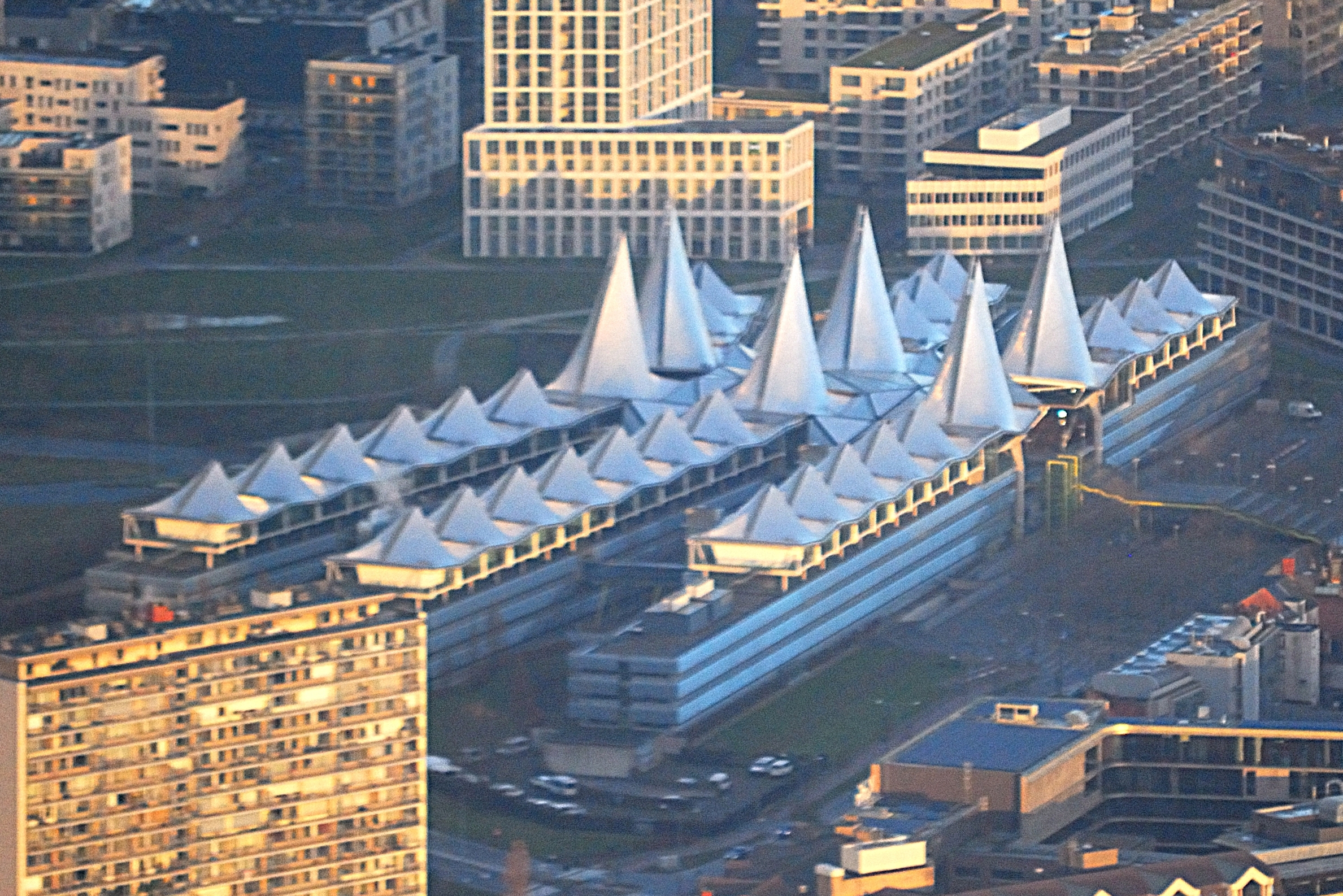
- Aerial view of the Palace of Justice
- Interactive map of the Palace of Justice of Antwerp area
- Alternative names: Antwerp Law Courts, Butterfly Palace

General information
- Status: Completed
- Architectural style: High-tech architecture
- Location: Bolivarplaats 20, Antwerp, Belgium
- Coordinates: 51.2039273°N 4.3852541°E
- Construction started: 3 April 2001
- Construction stopped: 28 October 2005
- Inaugurated: 28 March 2006
- Cost: €280 million
- Client: Régie des Bâtiments (Buildings Agency)
- Owner: Cofinimmo

Height
- Height: 18 metres

Technical details
- Floor count: 6 (1 underground and 5 above-ground)
- Floor area: 78,000 square metres (840,000 sq ft)
- Grounds: 3.7 hectares (9.1 acres)

Design and construction
- Architects: Ivan Harbour, Andrew Morris (Project Partners) and Avtar Lotay (Project Lead)
- Architecture firm: Richard Rogers Partnership and VK Studio
- Structural engineer: Arup and Bureau Van Kerckhove
- Services engineer: Arup and Bureau Van Kerckhove
- Quantity surveyor: Bureau Van Kerckhove
- Main contractor: Interbuild, KBC and Artesia
- Awards: Chicago Athaneum International Architecture Award, 2008; RIBA European Award, 2008; Staalbouwprijs, 2006

The Palace of Justice of Antwerp (Dutch: Justitiepaleis Antwerpen), commonly known as the Antwerp Law Courts (Dutch: Gerechtsgebouw Antwerpen), De Frietzakken, and the Butterfly Palace (Dutch: Vlinderpaleis), is a courthouse in Antwerp, Belgium. The building was erected on the site of the former Antwerp-South railway station, over the Bolivar Tunnel (Dutch: Bolivartunnel), and it houses eight district civil and criminal courts. It was inaugurated on 28 March 2006 by King Albert II, Minister of Justice Laurette Onkelinx, Minister of Finance Didier Reynders, governor Camille Paulus and mayor Patrick Janssens. The building was designed by the Richard Rogers Partnership, VK Studio and Arup.

== History ==
=== Site selection process ===
The judicial services for Antwerp were spread over 14 locations within the city. This made it difficult for the public to find their way around the different services and a central location was sought that would be more efficient. In the 1980s, the Belgian government's Régie des Bâtiments (English: Buildings Agency) considered expanding the existing law court, the Gerechtshof Britselei (English: British Avenue Law Courts), on the Britselei. However, this was discounted due to the residential nature of the area around the law courts.

In the 1990s, the Régie des Bâtiments created an interdepartmental working group to look for the most suitable locations within the city. Different locations were considered, the result of which was a proposal that the building should be in the south of the city on the site of the old Antwerp-South railway station. This site offered several advantages, namely that it would have the possibility of a clearly recognisable building, it was close to both the existing law courts on the Britselei, the Antwerp prison and the federal police, and lastly, it would have a good connection with the rest of the city with easy access to public transport.

The proposed law courts would sit on top of a new tunnel, the Bolivar Tunnel (Dutch: Bolivartunnel), which would be constructed at the same time and replace the old AMAM Tunnel (Aansluiting Met AMerikalei (English: Connection with Amerikalei) under the Bolivarplaats. The tunnel is still occasionally referred to as the AMAM Tunnel, instead of the Bolivar Tunnel.

=== Architects and engineers selection process ===
The Régie des Bâtiments organised an international architectural competition in 1998 to design a new building to house the Antwerp law courts. The jury was composed of representatives of the Antwerp city council, the Flemish Region, the federal justice system, architects from Belgium and abroad, the Régie des Bâtiments and the Order of Architects. The architectural competition consisted of two phases. In the first phase, any interested architectural practice could submit preliminary draft designs anonymously to the jury. Ten architects submitted draft designs, mainly from Belgium, but also from the Netherlands, France, Germany, and the United Kingdom. The designs were then evaluated and classified on the basis of the competition rules by the jury. The jury's classification was then binding on the architect/developer. On 5 October 1998, the identities of each designer was then announced to the jury. The jury then examined whether the designers met the conditions for participation. From the ten submitted designs, the jury then selected three designs to go onto the second phase, where the jury evaluated the preliminary drafts on the basis of criteria set out in the competition rules.

On 23 April 1999, it was announced that the winning team was the consortium from the United Kingdom of the Richard Rogers Partnership and Ove Arup & Partners, and VK Studio from Belgium. Richard Rogers and Arup were the same teams responsible for designing the Pompidou Centre in Paris, the Lloyd's building in London and the European Court of Human Rights building in Strasbourg. On 3 March 2000 the contract was signed between each of the parties so that detailed designs could be drawn up. On 21 September 2000, the Buildings Agency concluded a Promotion Agreement with Justinvest Antwerp, which was an association between Interbuild, KBC and Dexia. They then became responsible for providing alternative financing, project management, and project coordination during the construction phase. The site, which was owned by the Belgian state, was made available to Justinvest under a long-term lease.

=== Design and construction ===
The main building contractors selected were Interbuild, KBC and Artesia Construction of the building began on 3 April 2001, and by 22 July 2003, the 32 sail roofs began to be mounted on the building. A design study was necessary to determine the type of materials and construction methods required for the sail roofs. Wind tunnel studies were needed to determine the loads that they would need to bear during extreme weather conditions. Each of the 32 sail roofs was formed from four prefabricated quarters, which were assembled on-site with a system of bolts. The sail roofs were initially assembled in the former Cockerill shipyard workshop in Hoboken, a district of Antwerp. The wood lining of the sail roofs is visible from the public reception area, the salle des pas perdus. The outer roof cladding consists of a 0.4 mm thick stainless steel. Because of their size and weight, the sail roofs were transported by river via the Scheldt to Ledeganckkaai. There the four parts of a sail roof were unloaded and loaded onto a truck. The four parts were assembled and mounted on the final fastening points via a temporary construction tower. All sail roofs were installed by mid-April 2004.

== Architecture ==
The building is located in the south of the city centre, it consists of six wings of courts and offices that radiate out from a public reception area, called the salle des pas perdus (lit. 'hall of lost steps'). The entrance to the building is via a large staircase on ground level from the Bolivarplaats (English: Bolivar Place) rising over tram lines and onto the salle des pas perdus. Bolivarplaats is a large public town square. The most public areas of the building are the salle des pas perdus along with offices courtrooms close it. The more secure areas being further away, that are not accessible to the general public. The building has 1 underground and 5 above-ground floors, with two underground parking garages for staff. Offices are on 3 floors in each of the six wings. The contract to design the building was awarded to the Richard Rogers Partnership in association with Arup and VK Studio offices who proposed "an efficient, subtle and transparent building with a powerful symbolic image" with a "respect for the human scale". Ivan Harbour, the Project Partner at Richard Rogers Partnership, said of the building "Despite the building’s mass, we created a structure that was sympathetic to the scale of the city. The result is a long, low building with a roofscape animated by the hearing room enclosures".

=== Roof structure ===
Above each of the 26 small and 6 large courtrooms are "shell roofs" or "sail roofs" or "roof cones". They were designed to represent sails of ships, both past and present passing by on the river Scheldt. The larger courtrooms each have the tallest sail roofs (dimensions 9 x 9 x 7.3 meters (L x W x H)), while the small courtrooms have the smallest sail roofs (dimensions 9 x 9 x 3 metres). Ivan Harbour said that the sail roofs were designed to "bring fresh air into the courts". At one stage he said that he had hoped to "have the sails turning with the wind, scooping and funnelling fresh air into the building at all times of day, weather and season".

=== Interior ===
The building houses eight district civil and criminal courts, plus offices, chambers for judges and lawyers, a library, a dining room and the salle des pas perdus. It holds the following judicial services:

- Court of First Instance
- Office of the Public Prosecutor
- Labour Court
- Labour Auditor
- Commercial Court
- Police Court
- Justices of the Peace (cantons 1 to 3 and 5 to 8)
- The Bar Association ("the Bar")

=== Environmental features ===
When the Richard Rogers Partnership was designing the building they focused a great deal of attention on its environmental aspects of the project, and also on the effective use of energy. Therefore, a low environmental impact was important when designing the building. Natural light and ventilation was designed into the building. Rainwater is collected and then reused for sanitary purposes and to water the gardens. The runoff and wastewater are collected through separate systems. The landscape was planned with green embankments serve as a visual and acoustic barrier against the noise and pollution from the nearby motorway, to do this, 100 roof-shaped plane trees were planted on Bolivarplaats in front of the building. The trees were planted in the spring of 2006.

== Awards ==
- Chicago Athaneum International Architecture Award, 2008
- RIBA European Award, 2008
- Staalbouwprijs, 2006

== Gallery ==
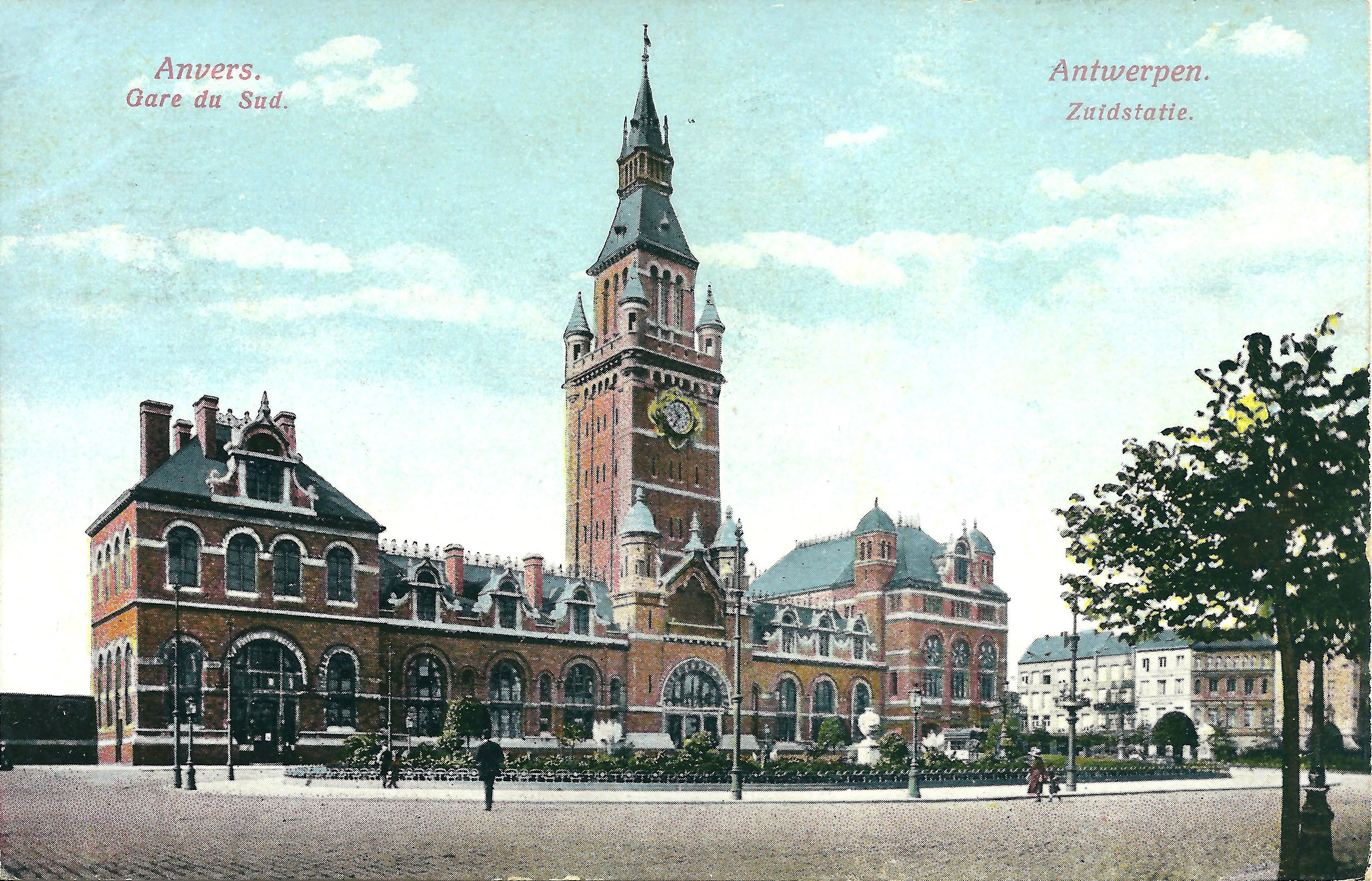
The former Antwerp-South railway station, now the site of the Palace of Justice

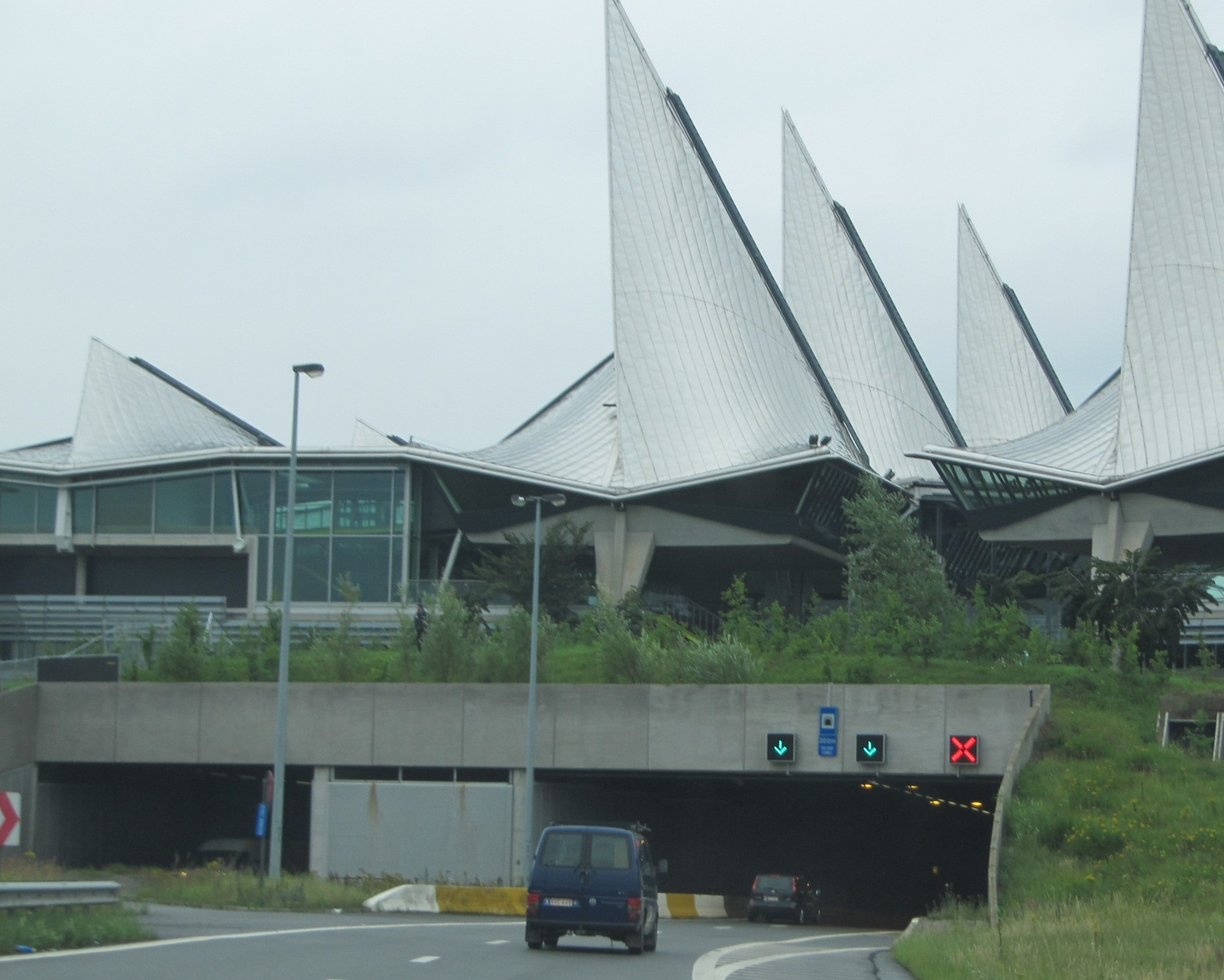
Bolivar Tunnel underneath the Palace of Justice

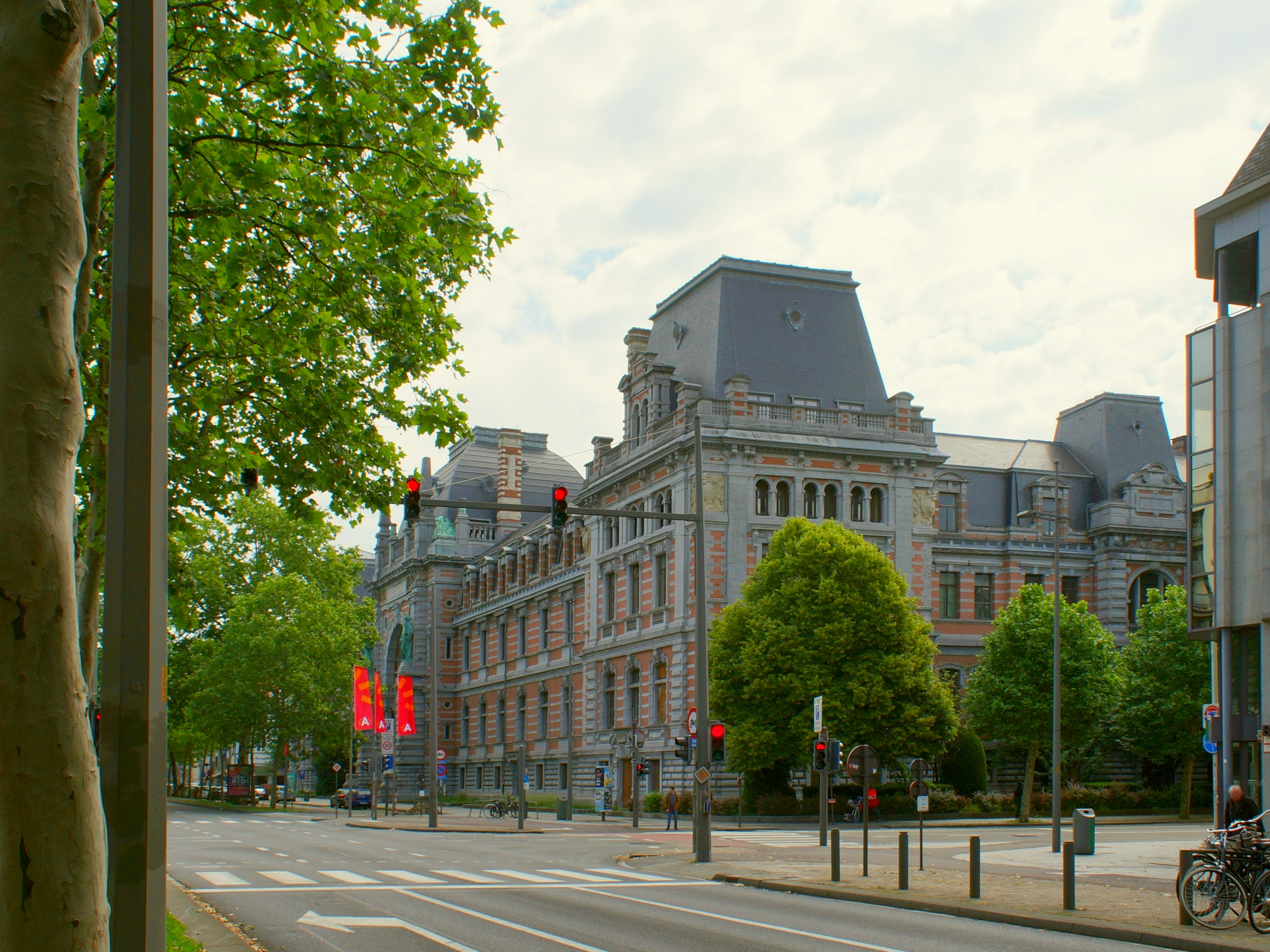
The Gerechtshof Britselei, the previous law courts on Britselei

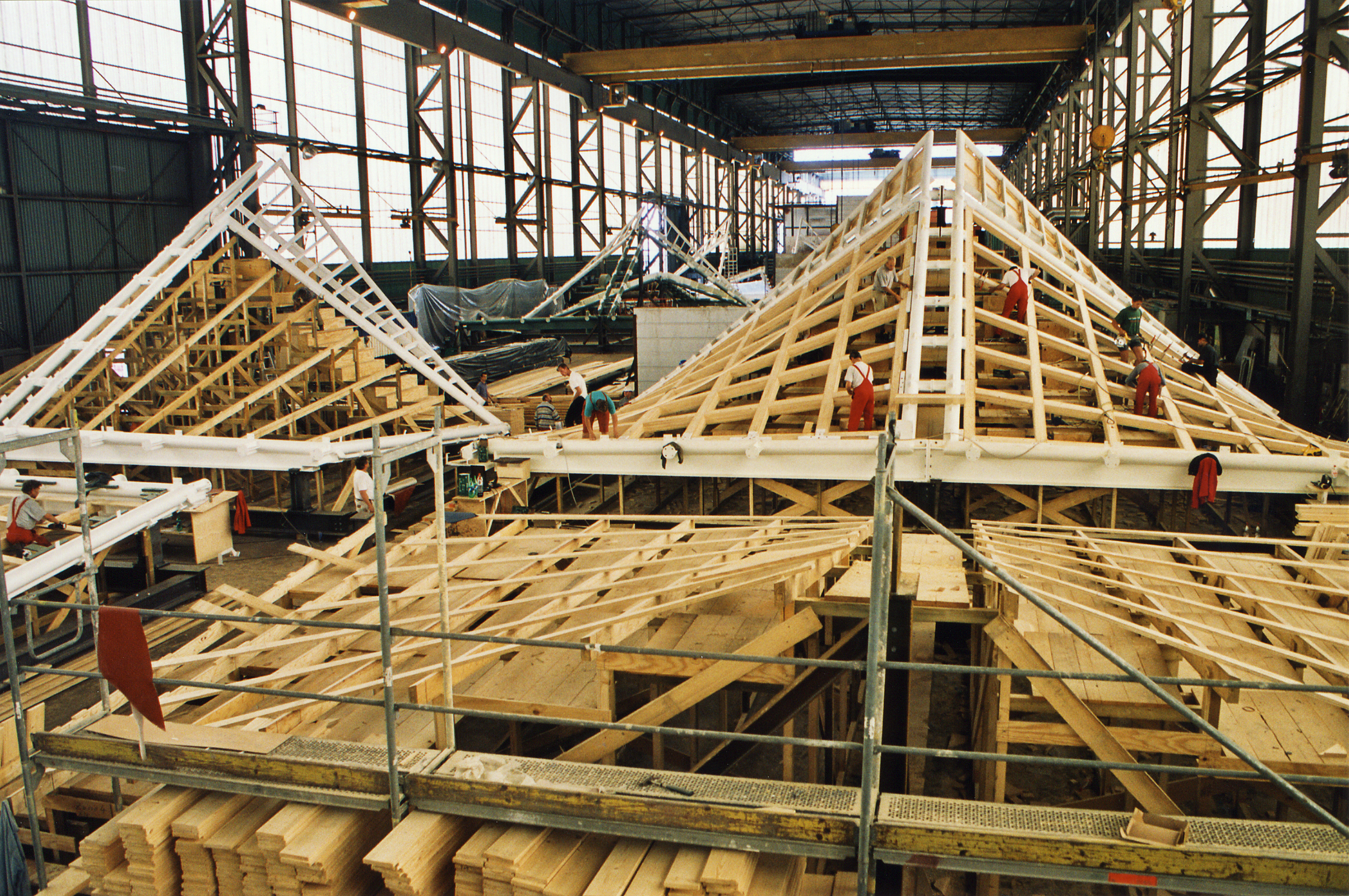
The sail roofs being manufactured in the former Cockerill shipyard

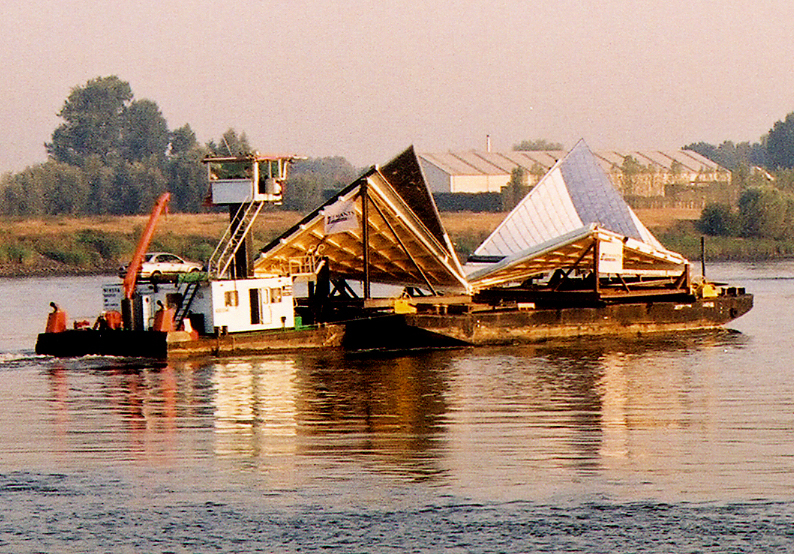
The sail roofs being transported on the Scheldt to Ledeganckkaai

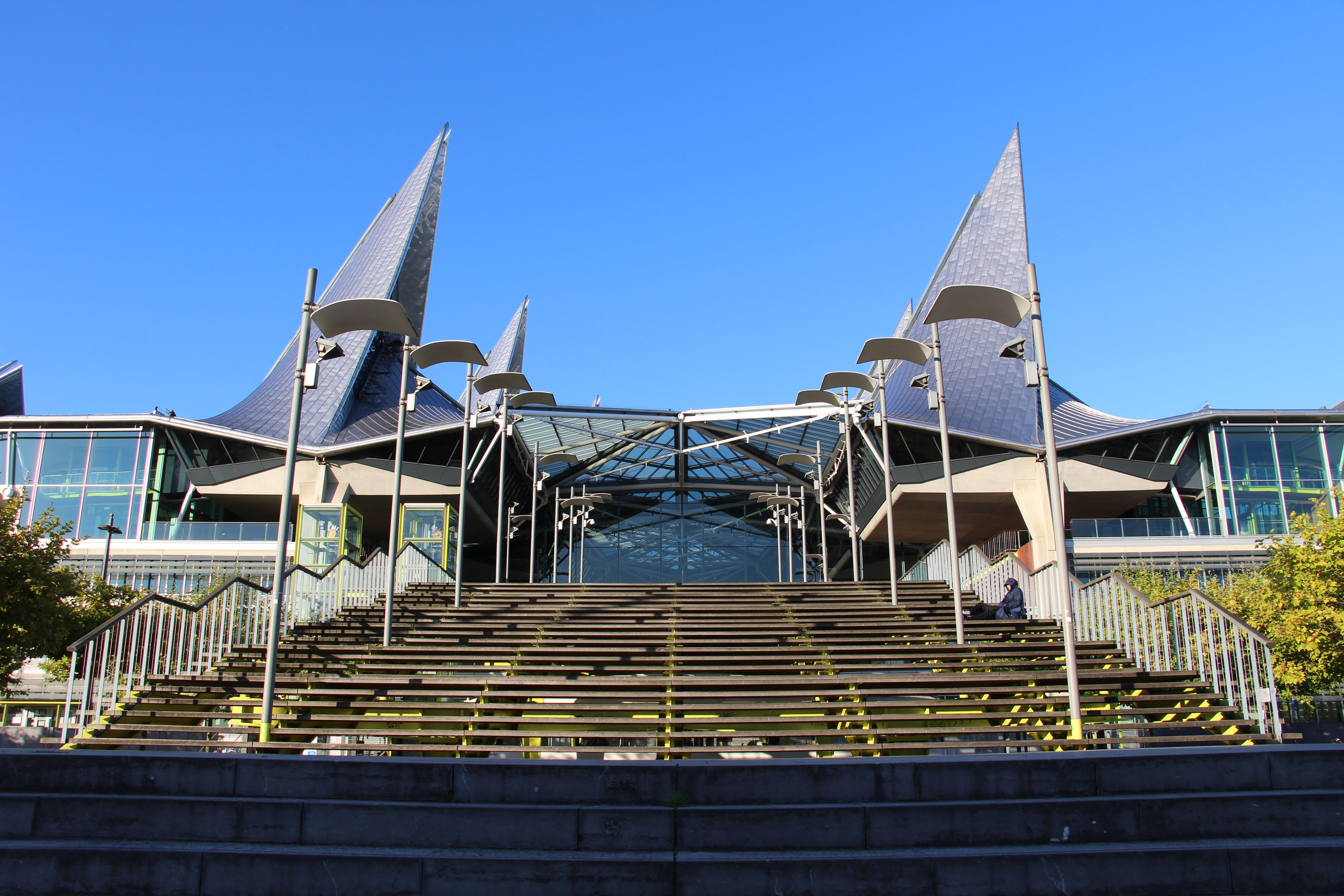
Steps leading up to the salle des pas perdus

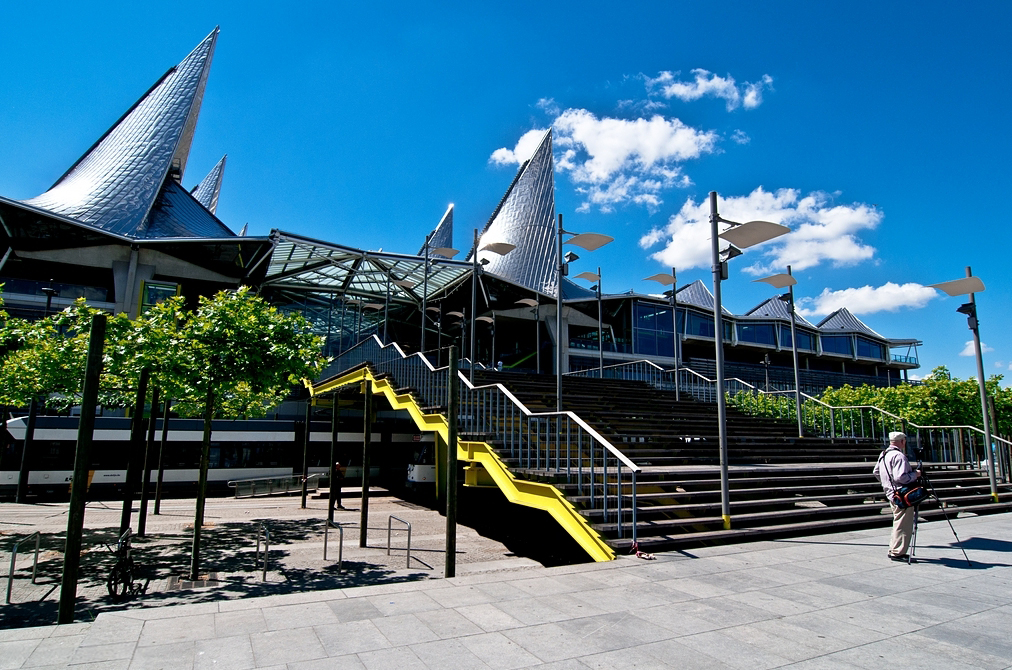
Entrance to the building is via a staircase from Bolivarplaats which runs over a tram line.

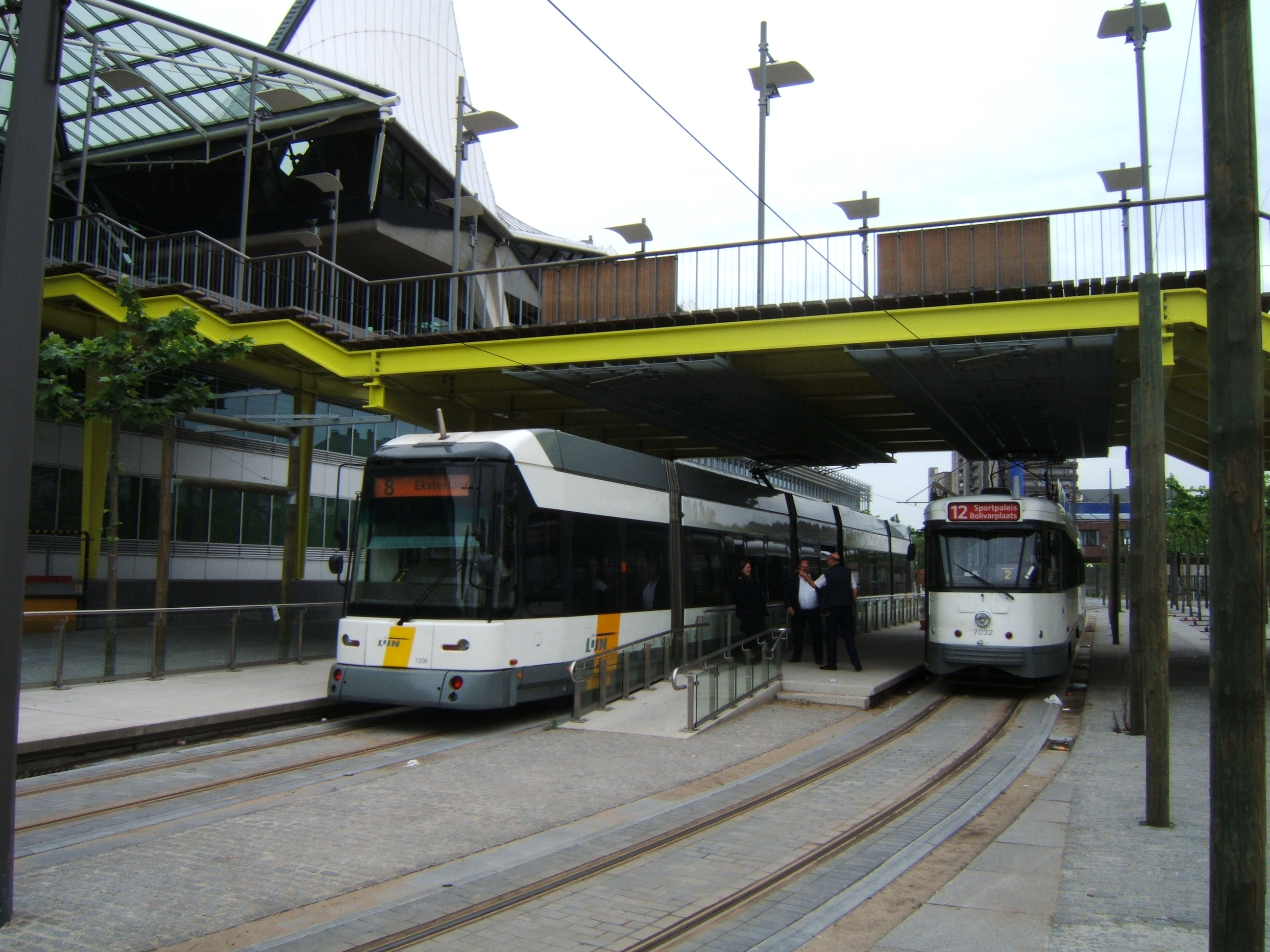
The steps above trams, which leads to the salle des pas perdus

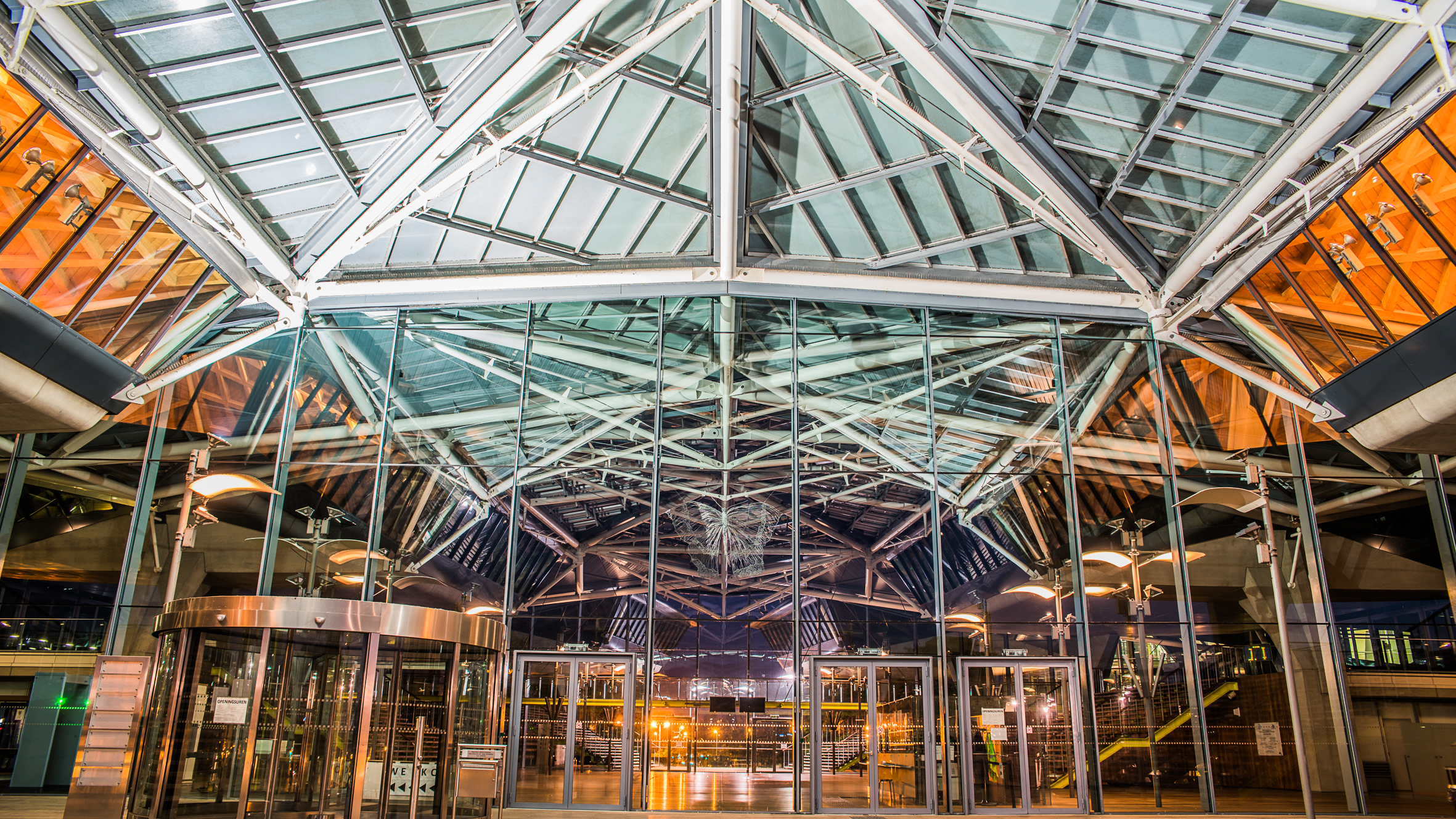
Entrance to the salle des pas perdus

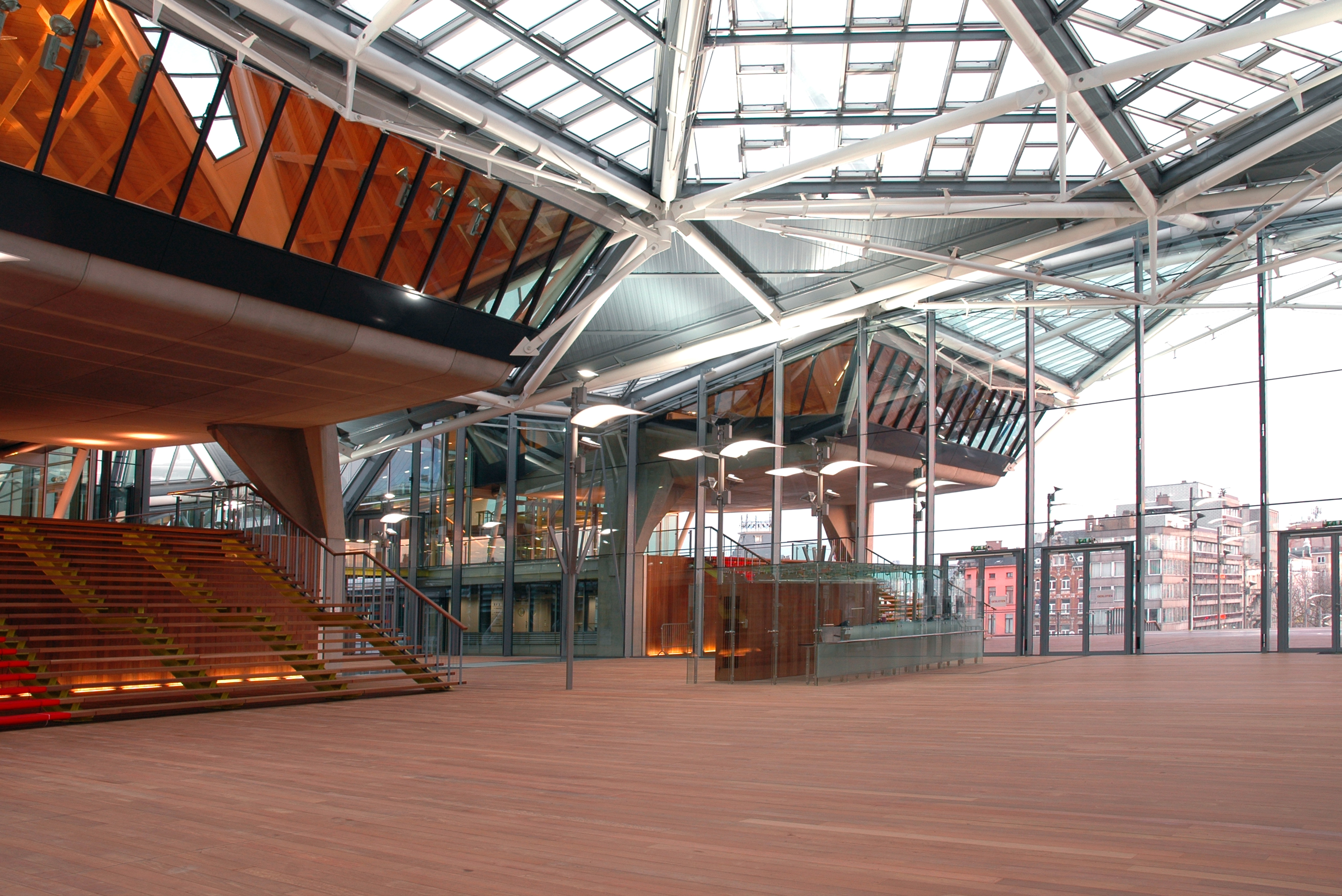
The salle des pas perdus

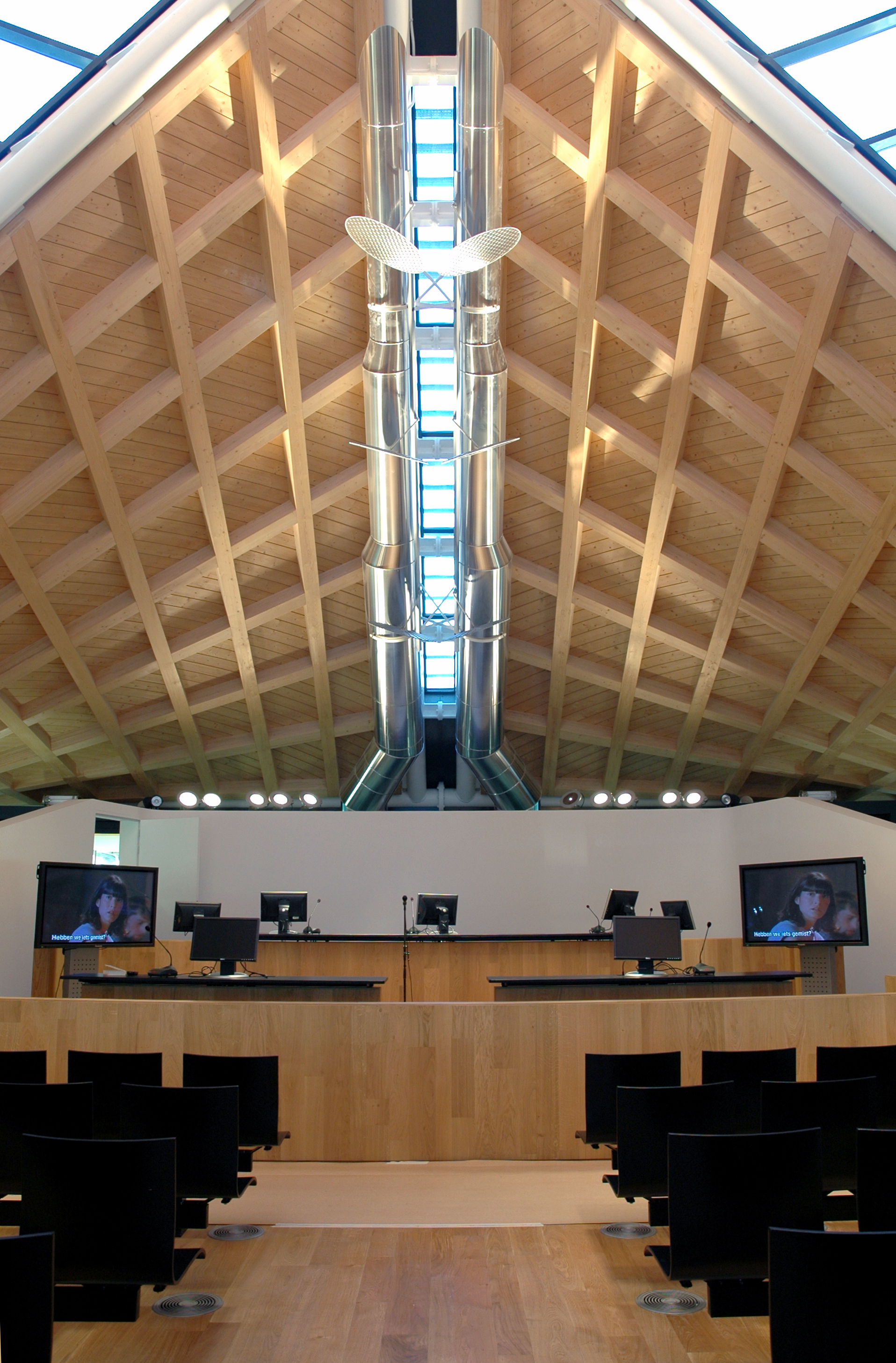
A courtroom and the inside of a sail roof (wood)

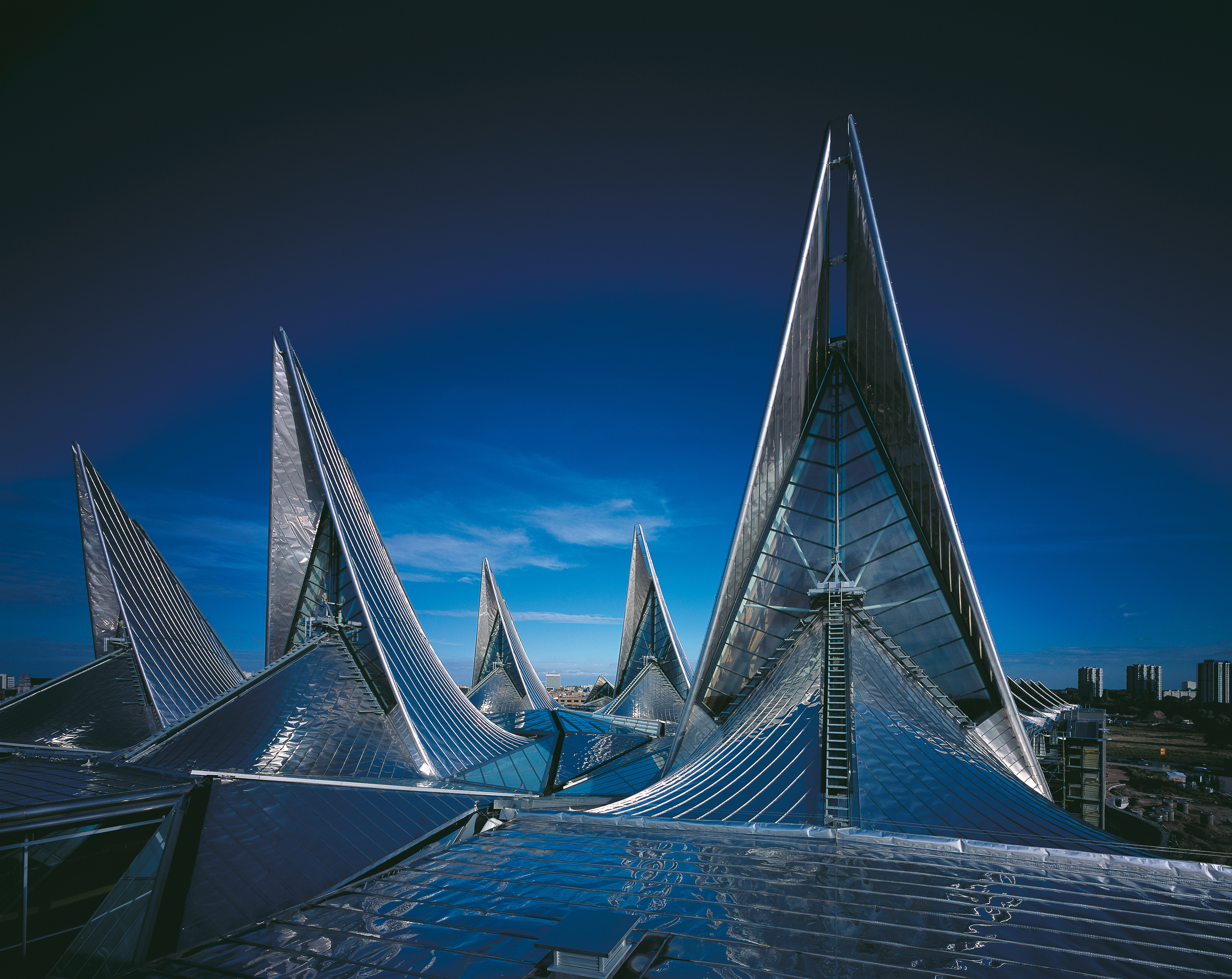
The front on view of the sail roofs in-situ

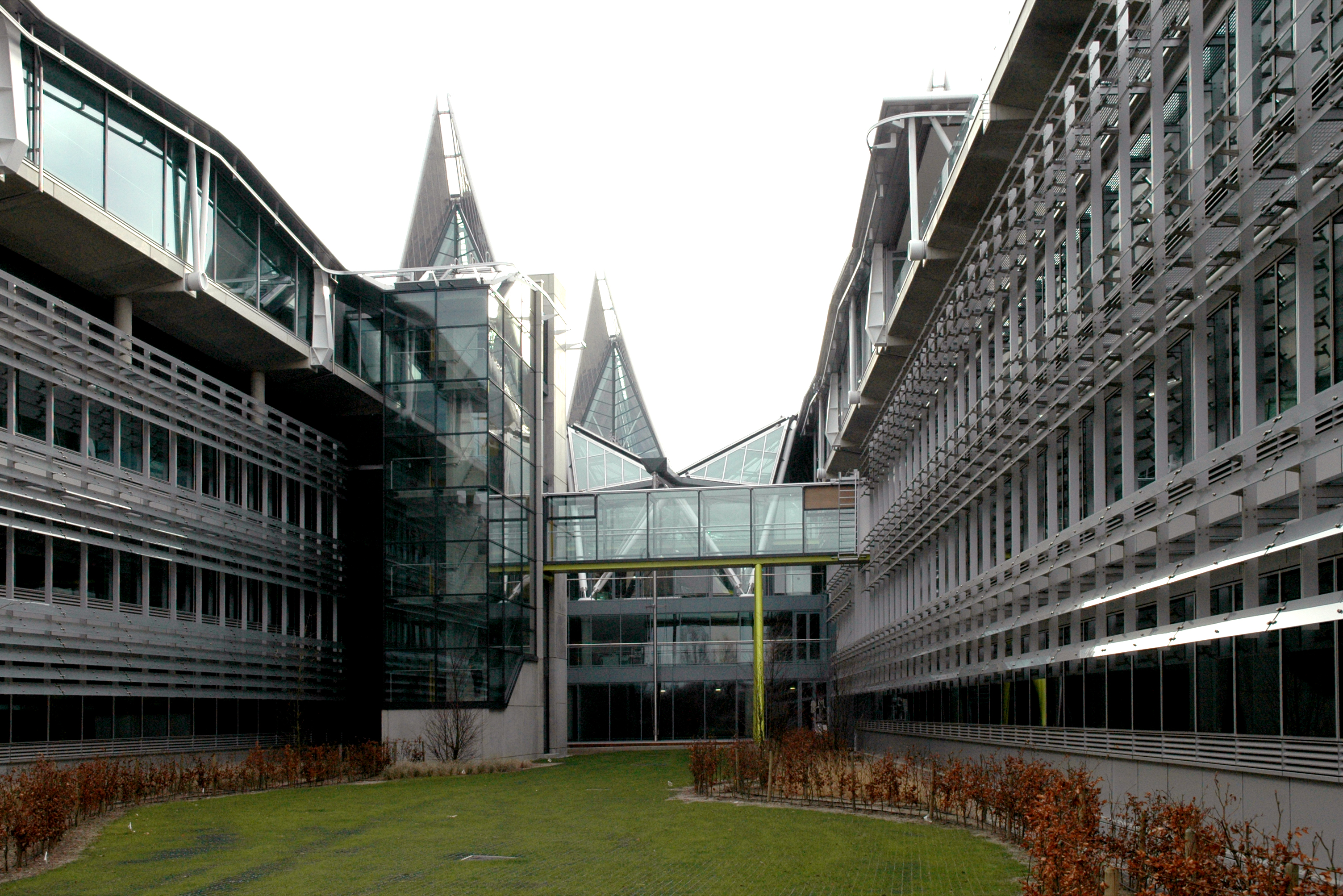
Between two of the wings

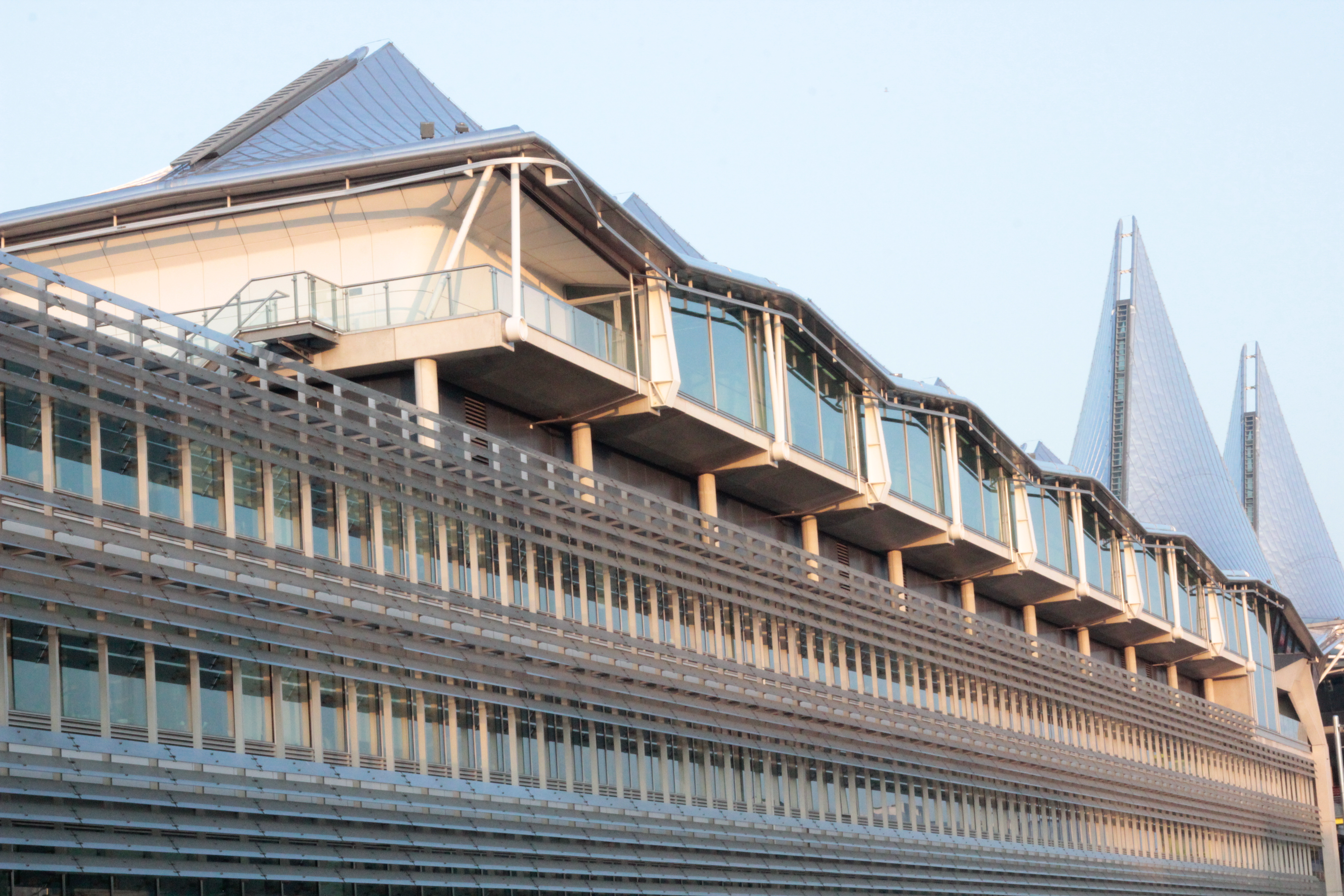
The façade of the building, with the offices on the lower floors and courts on the top floor

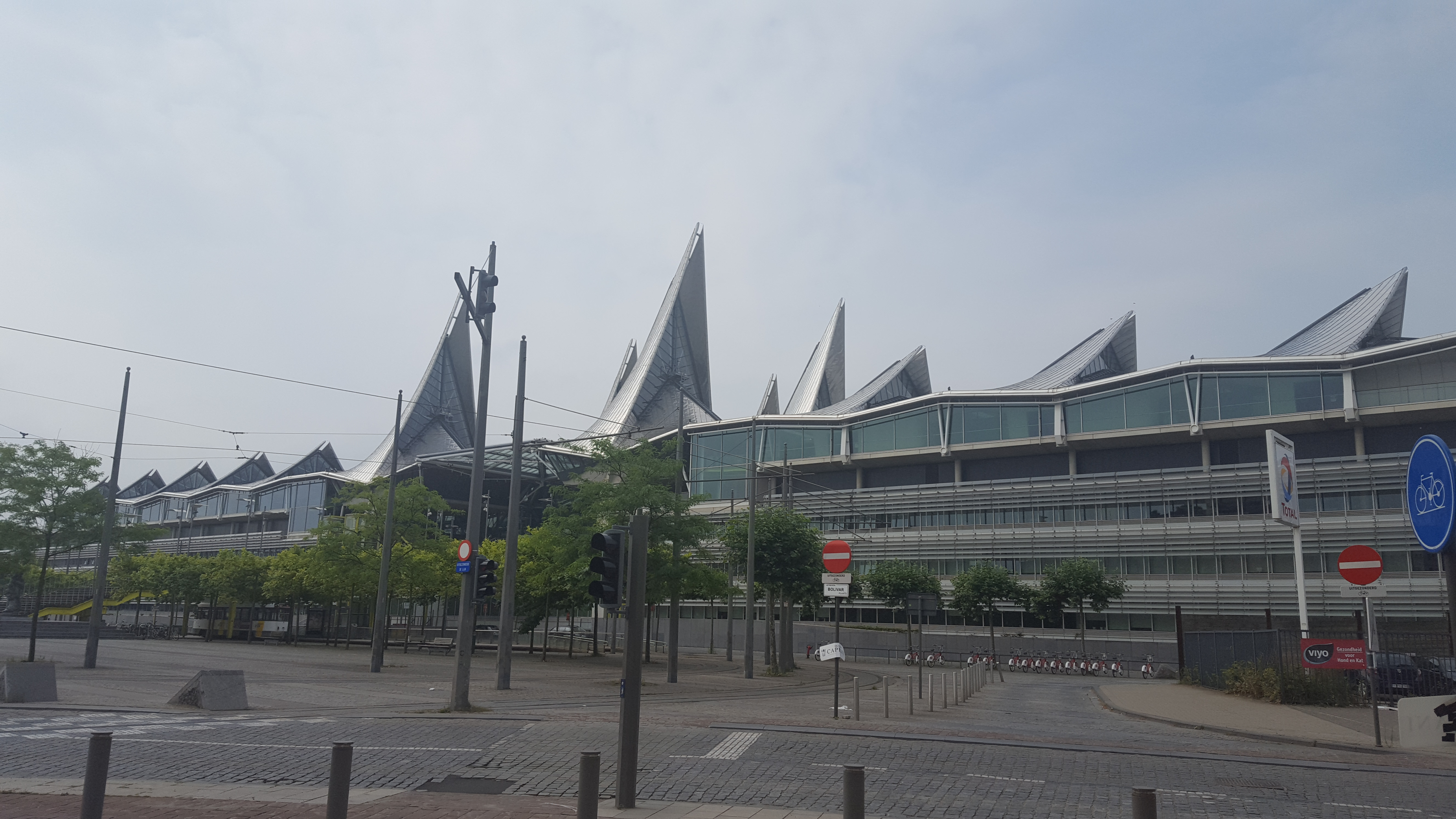
The façade of the full length building

== See also ==
- Palais de Justice, Brussels
