= Tram route 1 (Antwerp) =

Overview
- Locale: Antwerp
- Termini: Luchtbal Havana P+R; Bolivarplaats
- Stations: 29
- Color on map: White text on purple background

Service
- Type: tram
- System: Antwerp tram network
- Operator(s): De Lijn

History
- Opened: 8 December 2019

Tram route 1 is a tram route in Antwerp (Belgium) connecting the Bolivarplaats in the Zuid neighborhood with the Havana site in the Luchtbal neighborhood to the North via the Leien and Noorderlaan.

== Trajectory ==
Bolivarplaats-Amerikalei-Britselei-Frankrijklei-Italiëlei-Noorderplaats-Kempenstraat-Noorderlaan-Havana site.

== Historical route (1902-1965) ==
Tram route 1 has already existed in the past from September 2, 1902, until July 14, 1965, running on a comparable north–south trajectory as the current line, between the Antwerpen-Zuid passenger railway station and Antwerpen-Dokken en -Stapelplaatsen cargo station. In 1902, it was the first electrified tram route in Antwerp, and consequently it received the number 1. During the First World War, service on the route continued, although only until 8 o'clock. During the Second World War it became soon impossible to operate the line, due to damage inflicted on it. However, service could later slowly be resumed, and in 1944 the line was again fully operational. The line was eventually replaced a bus line in 1965, when the tram tracks at Antwerpen-Zuid station, as well as the old station itself, had to make place for the Kennedytunnel under the river Scheldt. Today, bus lines 1 and 13 have incorporated the previous itinerary of tram route 1 in their trajectory. Also, the southern half of the Leien is still serviced by tram routes 12 and 24.

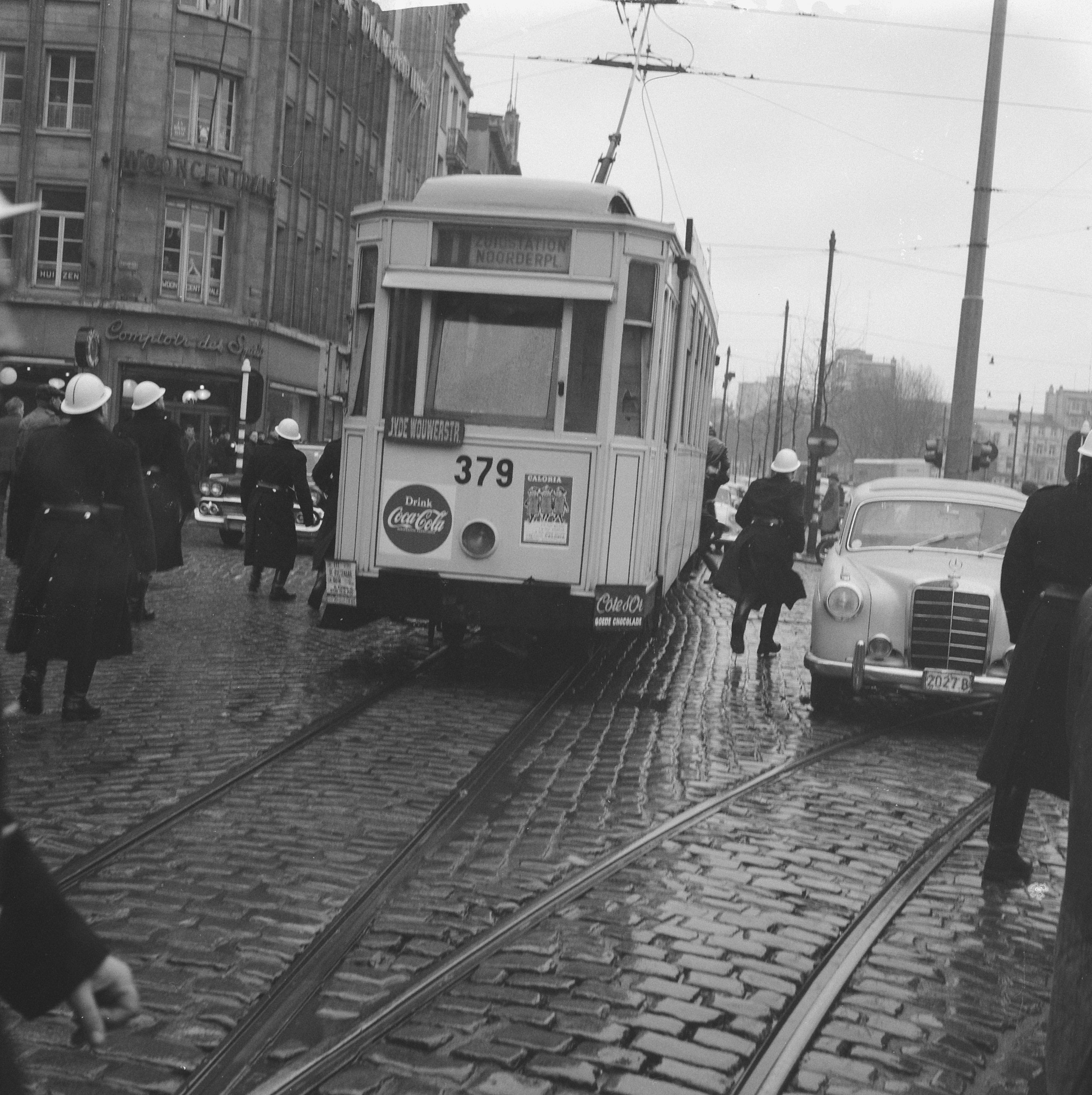
A motorcar on the old line in 1960

== New route (2019-) ==
As a part of the Brabo II and Noorderlijn plans, the new tram route 1 was officially opened on 8 December 2019, following the Bolivarplaats-Havana site trajectory. The creation of the tram route formed a part of the Noorderlijn ('northern line') construction works, which included the building of new tram tracks in the northern half of the Leien, as well as in the Noorderlaan further north and in the connecting streets.

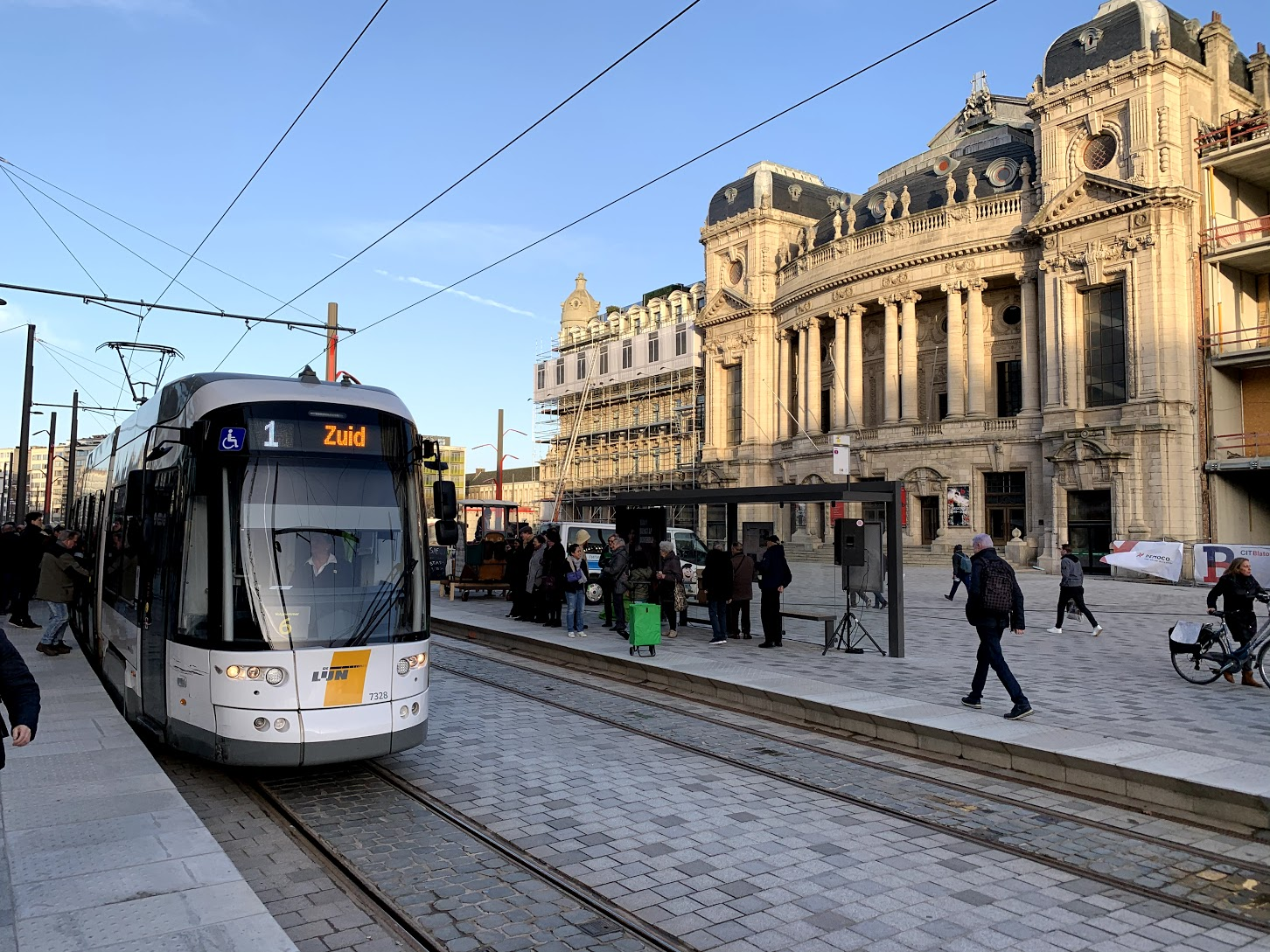
Inauguration of the new tram line 1

== Colour ==
Historically, tram route 1 was identified by a black number on a white background. The new tram route uses a white number on a purple background.
