= Cofinimmo =

Belgian real estate company

Cofinimmo S.A.
- Type: Société anonyme
- Traded as: Euronext Brussels: COFB; BEL 20 component
- Industry: Real estate
- Founded: 1983
- Headquarters: Brussels, Belgium
- Key people: Jean-Pierre Hanin (CEO)
- Revenue: 353,400,000 euro (2023)
- Net income: −55,497,000 euro (2023)
- Number of employees: 154 (2023)
- Website: www.cofinimmo.com

Cofinimmo is the foremost listed Belgian real estate company specialising in rental property. The company owns a property portfolio spread across nine European countries (Belgium, France, the Netherlands, Germany, Spain, Finland, Ireland, Italy and the United Kingdom) with a value of approximately 6.2 billion EUR by 2023. It involves healthcare properties (75% of the real estate portfolio), offices (18%), and property of distribution networks (7%). The healthcare real estate portfolio has a value of approximately 4.6 billion EUR.

As an independent company applying the highest standards of corporate governance and sustainability, Cofinimmo offers tenant services and manages its portfolio through a team of approximately 155 employees in Brussels, Paris, Breda, Frankfurt and Madrid.

Cofinimmo is listed on Euronext Brussels and is part of the BEL20 index.

The company benefits from the REIT regime in Belgium (RREC - Regulated Real Estate Company), in France (SIIC - Société d'Investissement Immobilier Cotée) and in the Netherlands (FBI - Fiscale Beleggingsinstelling). Its activities are supervised by the Financial Services and Markets Authority (FSMA), the Belgian regulator.

== History ==
Cofinimmo was founded in 1983 with a capital of 6 million EUR. In 1994 it was listed on the Brussels stock exchange, now called Euronext Brussels, and in 1996 adopted Belgian SICAFI status.

- 2005: First healthcare real estate investment in Belgium; First public-private partnership (PPP): the Antwerp courthouse
- 2007: Launched partnership with AB InBev Group for a portfolio of 1,068 pubs and restaurants located in Belgium and the Netherlands (Pubstone)
- 2008: First healthcare real estate investments in France; Adopted SIIC status (French REIT regime); First ISO 14001 certification
- 2011: Launched partnership with MAAF for a portfolio of 283 insurance agencies in France (Cofinimur I); Issued first convertible bonds
- 2012: First healthcare real estate investments in the Netherlands; Adopted FBI status (Dutch REIT regime)
- 2014: First healthcare real estate investments in Germany; Adopted RREC status in Belgium; First sustainability report based on GRI index
- 2015: Capital increase with preference rights in the amount of 285 million EUR; Continued investing in healthcare real estate in the Netherlands and Germany
- 2016: Continued investments in healthcare real estate in the Netherlands and Germany; Opened first Flex Corners® and The Lounge® sites; Issued green & social bonds
- 2018: Capital increase with irrevocable allocation rights in the amount of 155 million EUR; Accelerated investments in healthcare real estate (300 million EUR); Initiated the rebalancing of the office portfolio
- 2019: Launched the 30³ project, aimed at reducing the portfolio's energy intensity by 30% by 2030 from 2017 levels, based on SBTi (Science Based Targets initiative); Continued to accelerate investments in healthcare real estate (almost 500 million EUR); First healthcare real estate investments in Spain; Accelerated rebalancing of the office portfolio in the Brussels' CBD (Central Business District); Over 56% of the consolidated portfolio invested in healthcare real estate
- 2020: First healthcare real estate investments in Finland; Capital increases in the amount of nearly 143 million EUR; Issued a first 500 million EUR benchmark sustainable bond; More than 700 million EUR invested, including nearly 600 million EUR in healthcare real estate in Europe; 59% of the consolidated portfolio invested in healthcare real estate
- 2021: Almost 1 billion EUR invested in healthcare real estate in Europe; First healthcare real estate investments in Ireland, Italy and the United Kingdom; 67% of the consolidated portfolio invested in healthcare real estate; Contribution of the office portfolio into a subsidiary; Capital increases in the amount of nearly 565 million EUR; Partially disposed the Cofinimur I portfolio (property of distribution networks)
- 2022: Almost 550 million EUR invested in healthcare real estate in Europe; 70% of the consolidated portfolio invested in healthcare real estate; Capital increases in the amount of nearly 114 million EUR; Further disposal of part of the Cofinimur I portfolio; 76 million EUR divested in office buildings
- 2023: Inclusion in the new Euronext BEL ESG index and the Financial Times' 500 Europe's Climate Leaders list; 75% of the consolidated portfolio invested in healthcare real estate; Capital increases in the amount of nearly 247 million EUR; Completion of the disposal of the Cofinimur I portfolio; 40th anniversary of the group on 29.12.2023

In June 2025, Aedifica made an exchange (effectively merger) offer to combine the companies under the Aedifica name. The transaction was settled in March 2026.
