= Antwerpen-Zuid railway station =

Railway station in Antwerp, Belgium

Antwerpen-Zuid
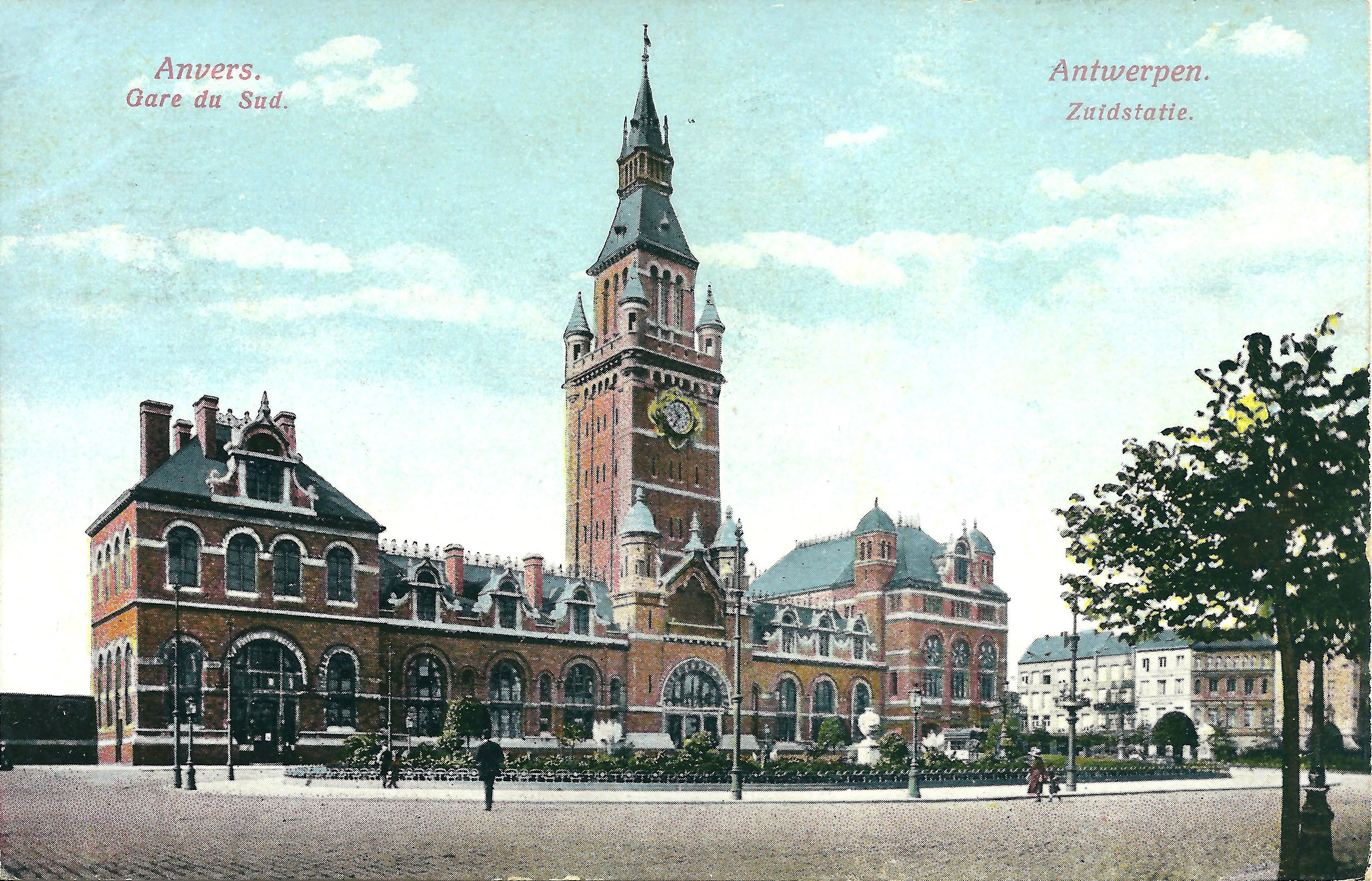
- Postcard of 1911, Old station

General information
- Location: Antwerp, Antwerp, Belgium
- Coordinates: 51°11′51″N 4°23′28″E
- System: Railway Station
- Owner: National Railway Company of Belgium
- Lines: 52, 59
- Platforms: 4
- Tracks: 4

History
- Opened: 10 July 1878
Location

Antwerpen-Zuid (English: Antwerp South) is a railway station in the south of the city of Antwerp, Antwerp, Belgium. The old station opened on 10 July 1878 (goods) on the Lines 52 (1894) and 25A (1907). The old station building was demolished in 1965 and replaced with a stop in 1970 on the new through railway under the Scheldt river on the line 59. In 2006, the Butterfly Palace, designed by the Richard Rogers Partnership, was built on the location of the old station. It houses the Antwerp Law Courts.

== Train services ==
The following services currently the serve the station:

- Intercity services (IC-02) Ostend - Bruges - Gent - Sint-Niklaas - Antwerpen
- Intercity services (IC-28) Gent - Sint-Niklaas - Antwerp (weekdays)
- Local services (L-22) Puurs - Antwerp - Essen - Roosendaal (weekdays)
- Local services (L-30) Lokeren - Antwerp

Preceding station	NMBS/SNCB	Following station
Beveren towards Oostende	IC 02	Antwerpen-Berchem towards Antwerpen-Centraal
Sint-Niklaas towards De Panne	IC 28	Antwerpen-Berchem towards Antwerpen-Centraal
Hoboken-Polder towards Puurs	L 22	Antwerpen-Berchem towards Roosendaal
Zwijndrecht (B) towards Lokeren	L 30	Antwerpen-Berchem towards Antwerpen-Centraal

== Tram services ==
Tram lines 4 and 10 serve the station, tram line 1 terminates at the nearby Zuid transport hub. All trams are operated by De Lijn.

== Bus services ==
Bus services 13, 14, 180, 181, 182, 183, 290, 295, 298 and 500 serve the station, these are operated by De Lijn.
