= Jan Cockx =

Belgian painter (1891–1976)

Jan Cockx (1891, Boechout – 26 August 1976) was a Belgian painter perhaps best known for landscapes, still life and harbor scenes.

Working with exuberant colors and mostly large-scale canvases, Cockx often painted simple subjects in vibrant ways. He defined space with color and often flattened the perspective. Some of his paintings appear to be influenced by Post-Impressionist and Fauve artists including Matisse and Gauguin. The pure, strong colors and distortion of form evocative of Fauvism are seen in a number of Cockx's works.

World War I interrupted his studies at the Antwerp Royal Academy of Fine Arts and set back his fledgling art career. His first show, in Paris, was not until 1920, but was quickly followed by exhibitions in Antwerp (1922), Geneva (1923) and at museums in Maastricht and Lyon.

His artistic career included experimentation with ceramics, graphics and illustrations for Ça ira, an art magazine group.
