= Schaliehoeve =

Farmhouse in Boechout, Belgium

Coordinates: 51.1633°N 4.5056°E

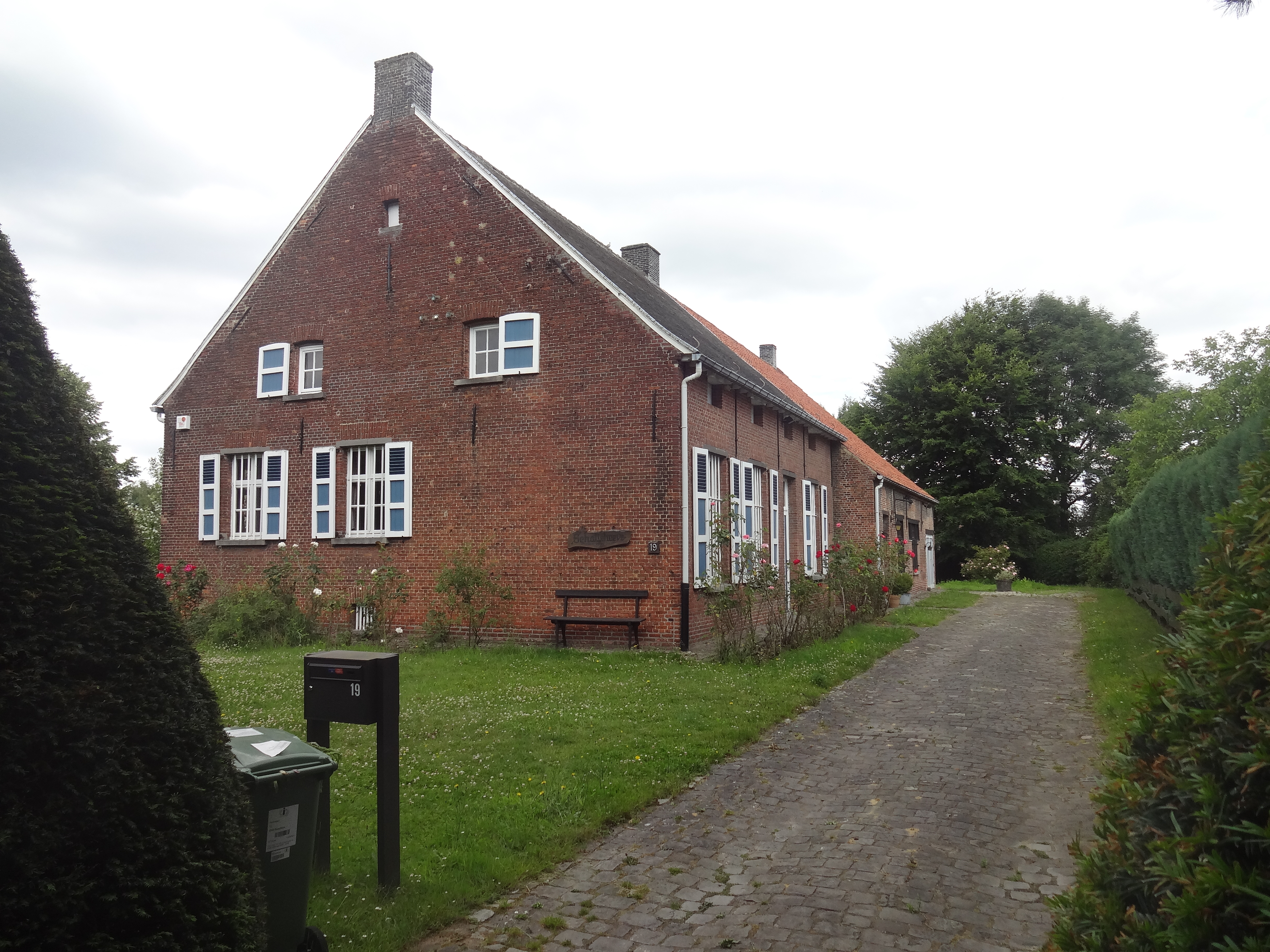
Schaliehoeve from the street

The Schaliehoeve is an old farmhouse in the Flemish municipality Boechout in Belgium, located on the Heerbaan.

== History ==
J. Jacobs has compiled historical notes Schaliehoeve in 1973, but the document was never published. Much of the information in this page was taken from there. The document mentions the sharecroppers from 1569 till 1867, as well as the names of two sharecroppers before 1569.

A book of accounts of the Castle of Boechout dated 1560 refers to the farm along the "herbane" - this was not a Roman road, but a winding road between Antwerp and Lier. This book of accounts mentions successive owners as of the second half of the 15th century.

During the 16th century the farm experienced a major expansion.

The name "Schaliehoeve" does not appear until 1634. Before that it was also named as "Wouters goet van Karenbroeck" ("the property of Wouters in Kaenbroeck") and "Herberge Te Putte" ("Hostel in Putte"). A map dated 1714, showing the new paved road Antwerp-Lier, the farm is mentioned as "the Chastille", and has a U-shape. Another map, dated 1753, shows the farm in its current I-shape. Thus, the present building dates from the early 18th century.

The farm can be seen on the Ferraris Map (1770–78). It was one of the few independent farms in the region. It was used as headquarters for Napoleonic, German and Allied armies. During the Second World War, the entrance gate was rammed by tanks and collapsed.

The grounds of Schaliehoeve were parceled 1964 and now form the "Schaliehoevewijk". The farm itself was extensively renovated and converted into a house. The barn collapsed around that time.

== Description ==
The main building, which still exists and is inhabited, consists of a front portion, with a typically slate roof where the firm takes its name (a slate is called "Schalie" in Dutch), and a rear section with old tiles. The front section was the original house, while the rear section were the stables. During the renovation in the 1960s the stables were converted into four bedrooms, a kitchen, two bathrooms and a garage.

== Characteristics ==
The characteristics of the buildings include:

- Two "opkamers" - rooms above a low cellar and thus higher than the rest of the house - served as bedrooms seen the better insulation from the ground; the low cellars served as cool storage places;
- A very large fireplace with a peephole to the former stables; there was even room for a stove inside the fireplace to warm up the food for the animals, with a hole in the wall to pass it directly to the stables;
- A spacious loft where once the harvest was brought in; was a small living area even provide for temporary workers during harvest.
- A large hayloft; it even included a small room for the day laborers.

The whole house was kept as much as possible in a rustic style. The present owners are the Pladys-Schiltz family.

== Gallery ==
Characteristics

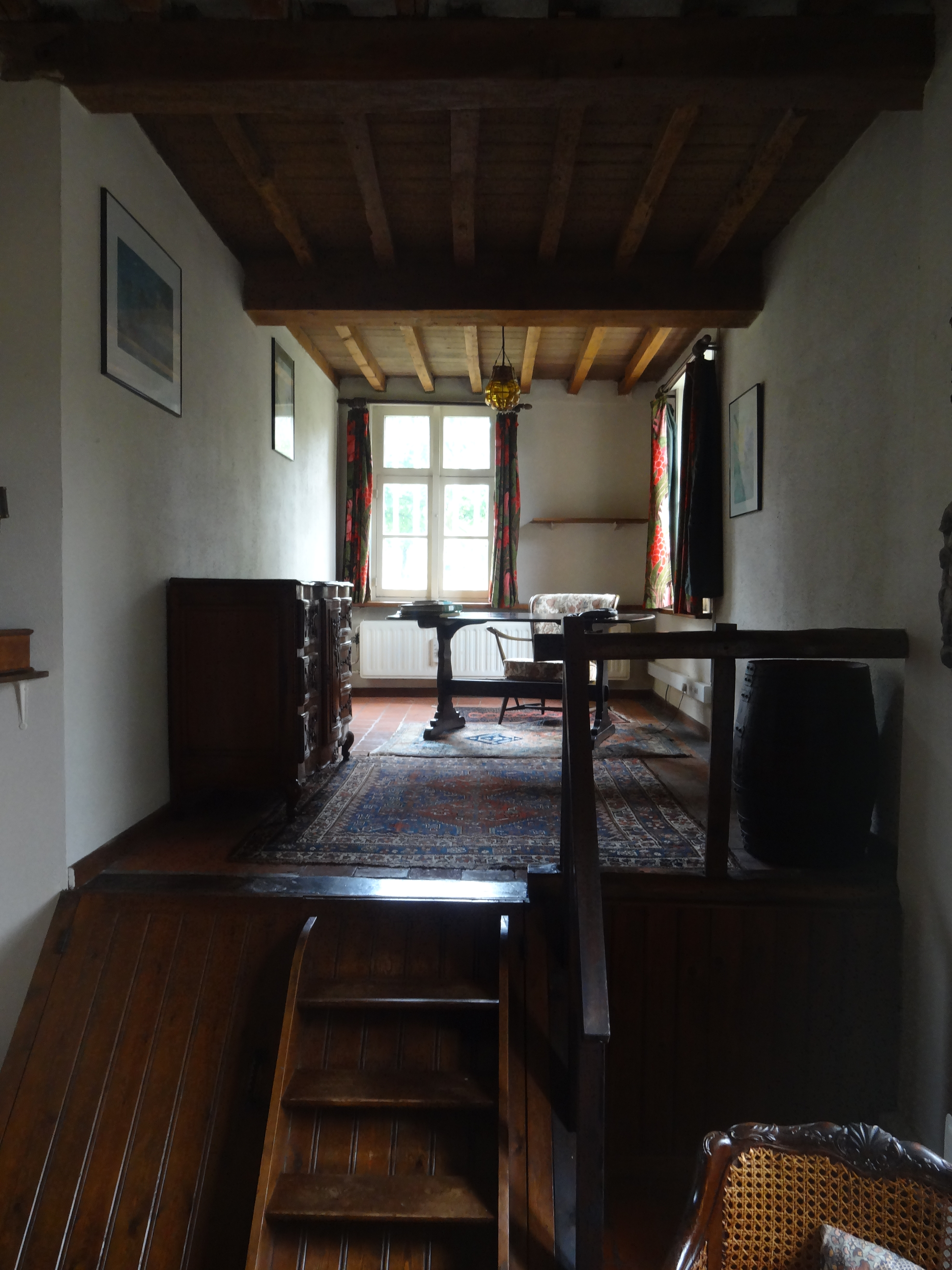
Opkamer

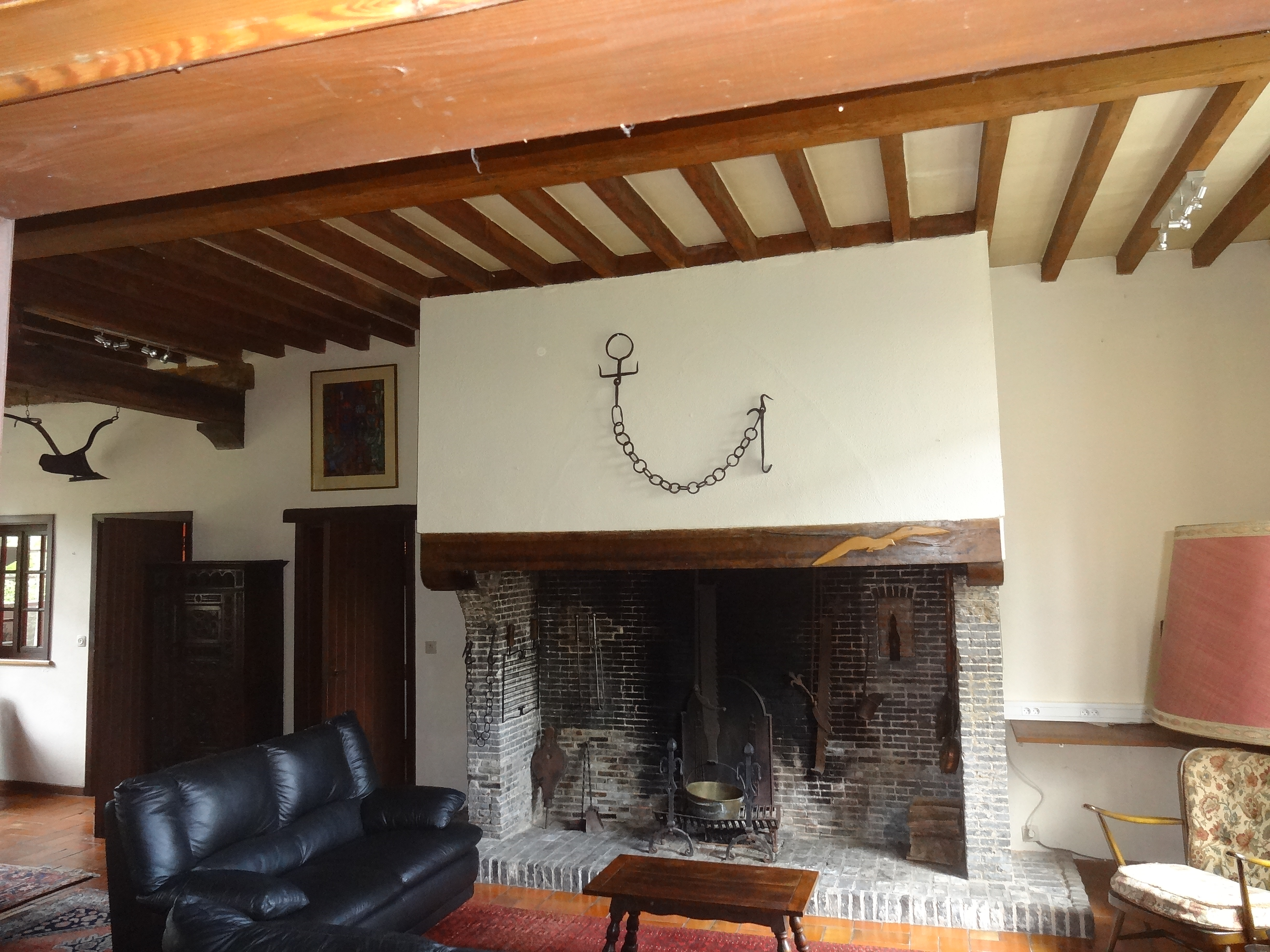
Fireplace

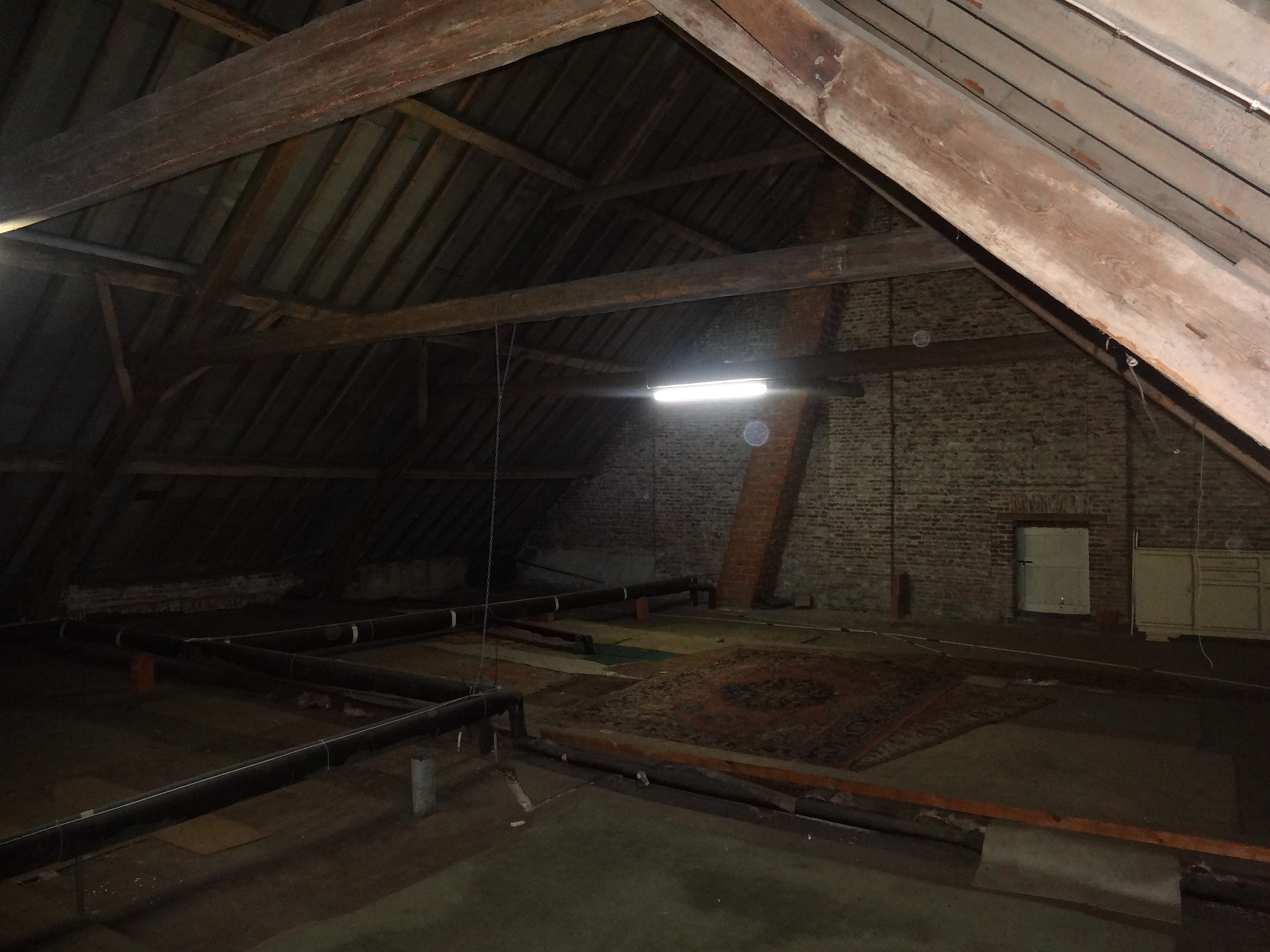
Hayloft
Exterior

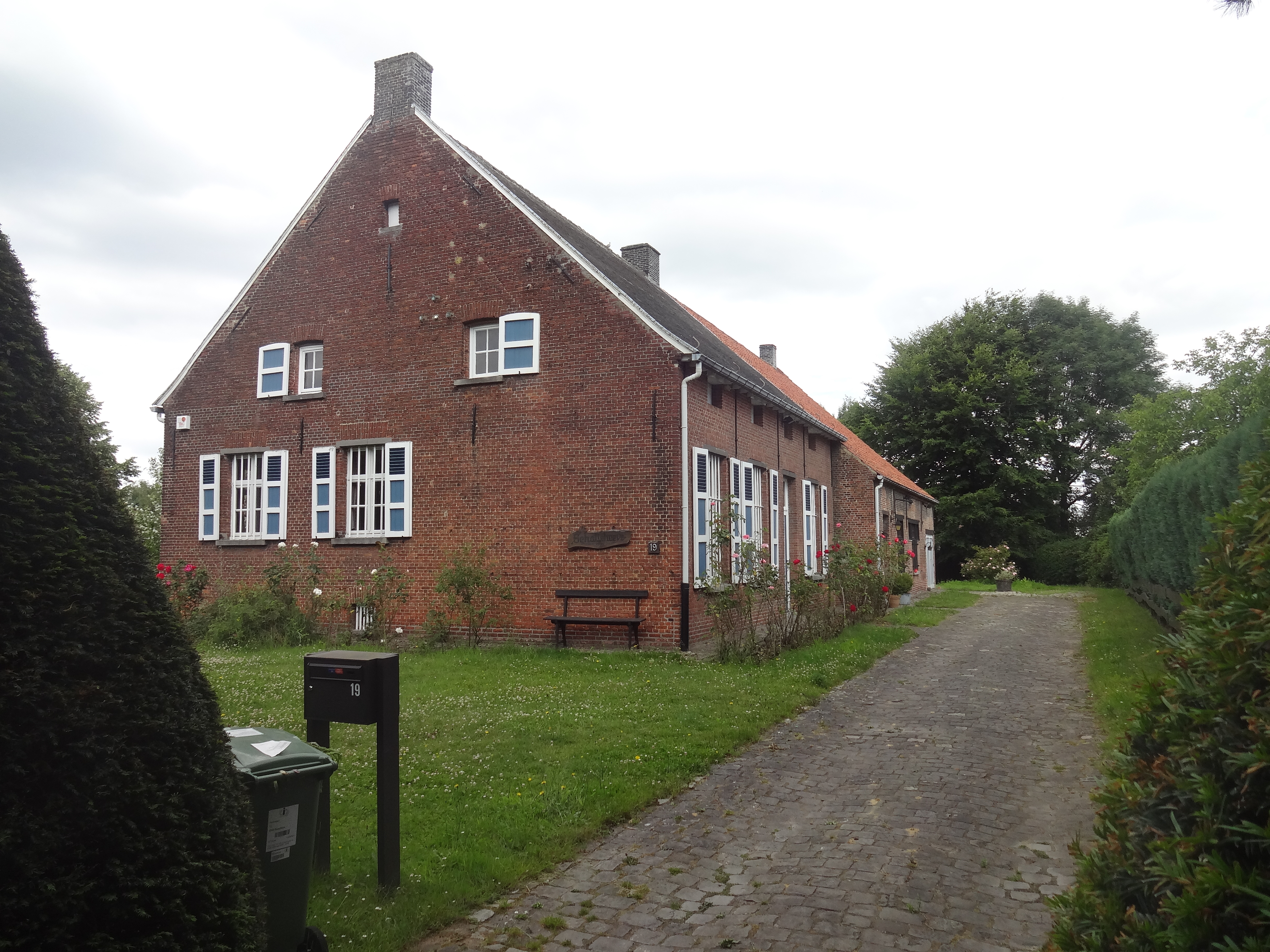
Street View

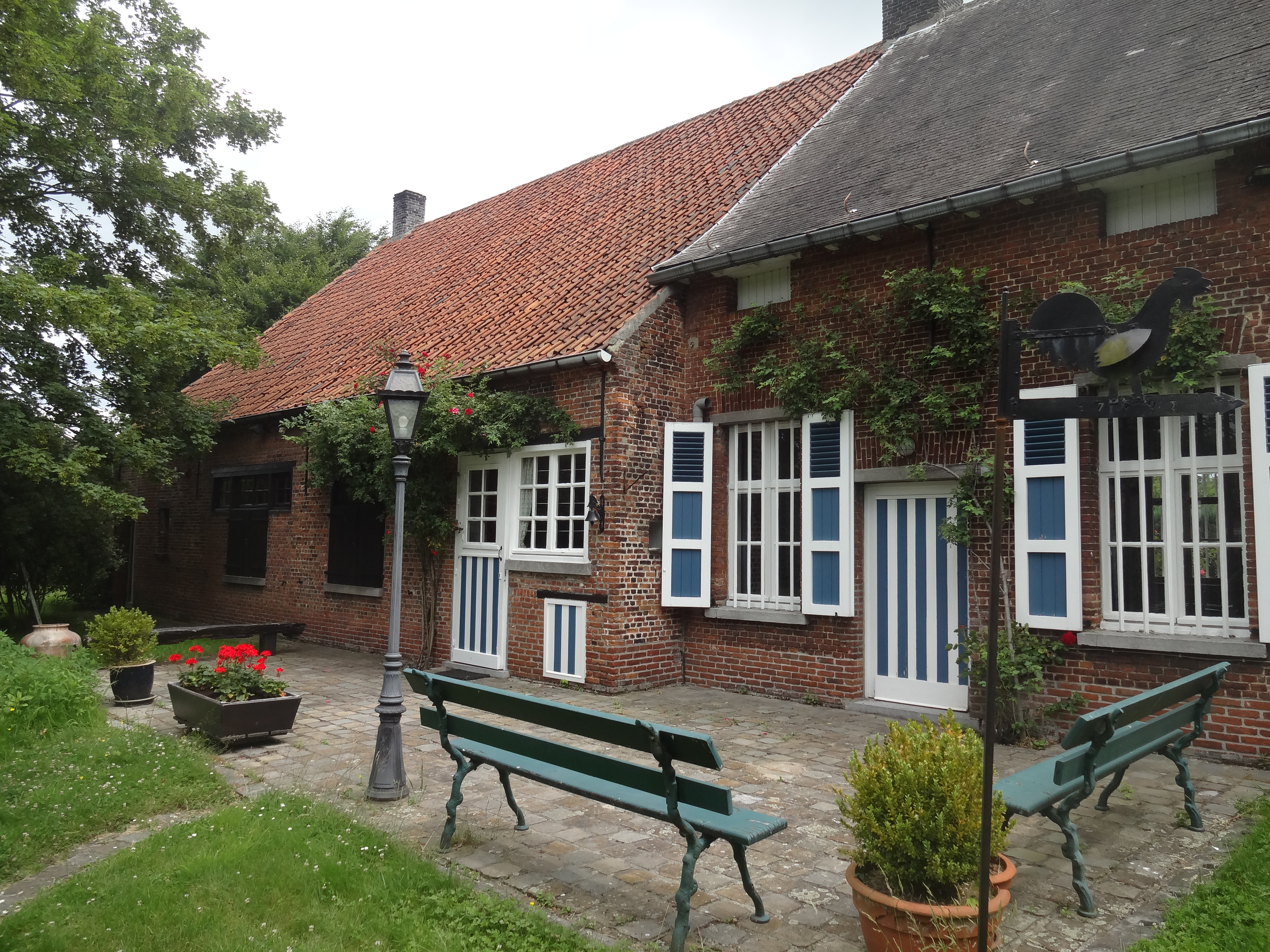
Garden view

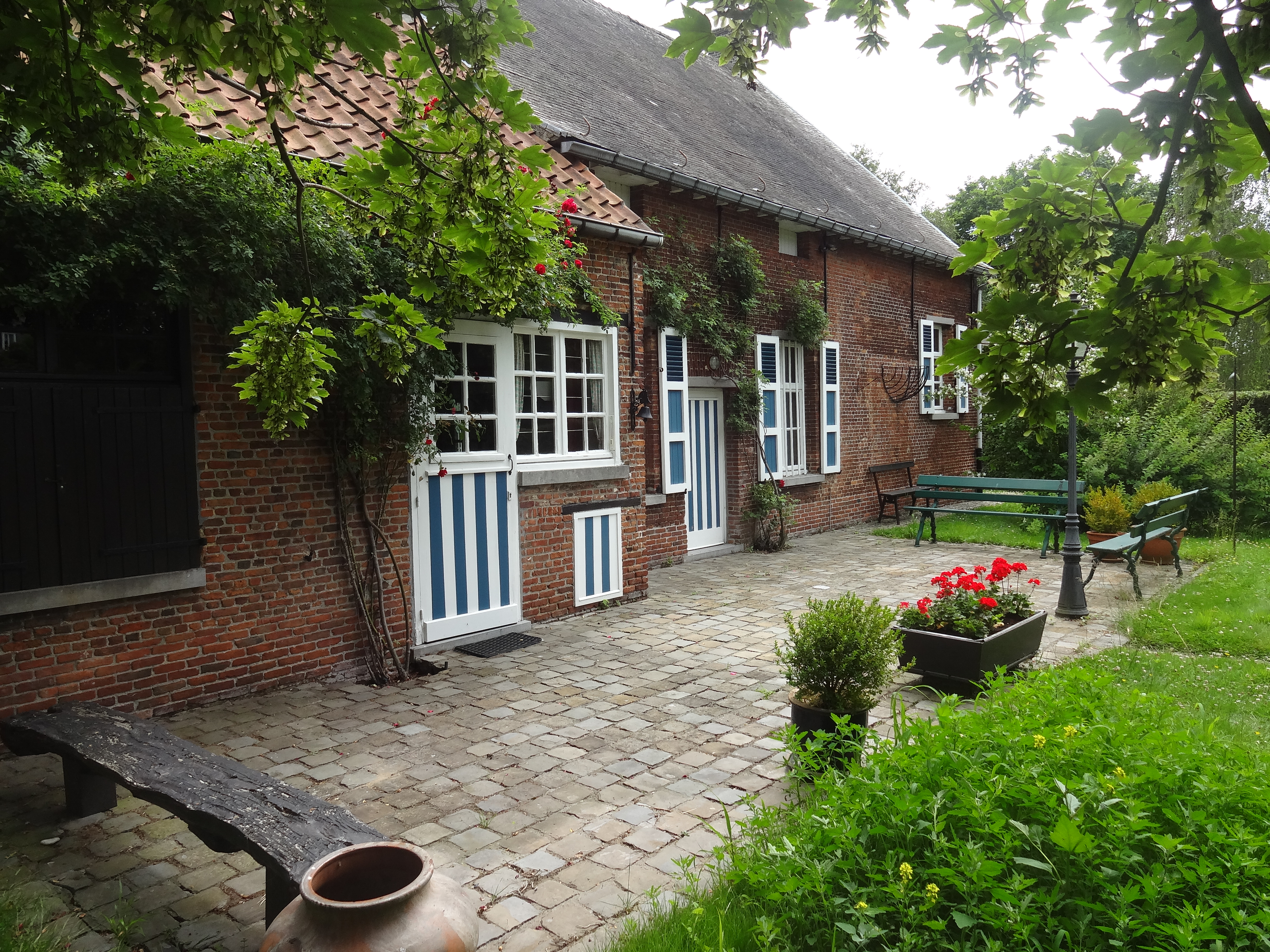
Terrace
Living room

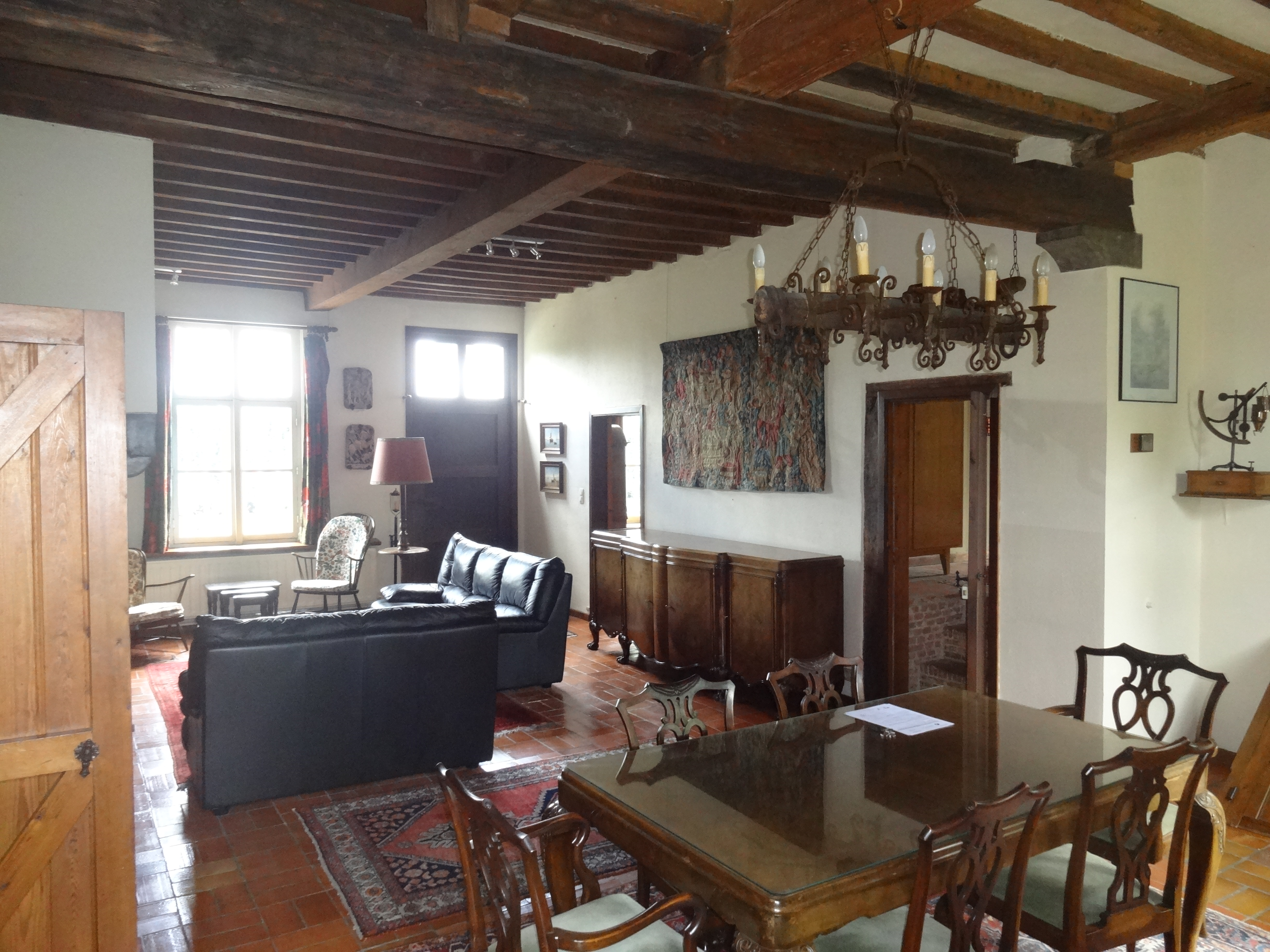

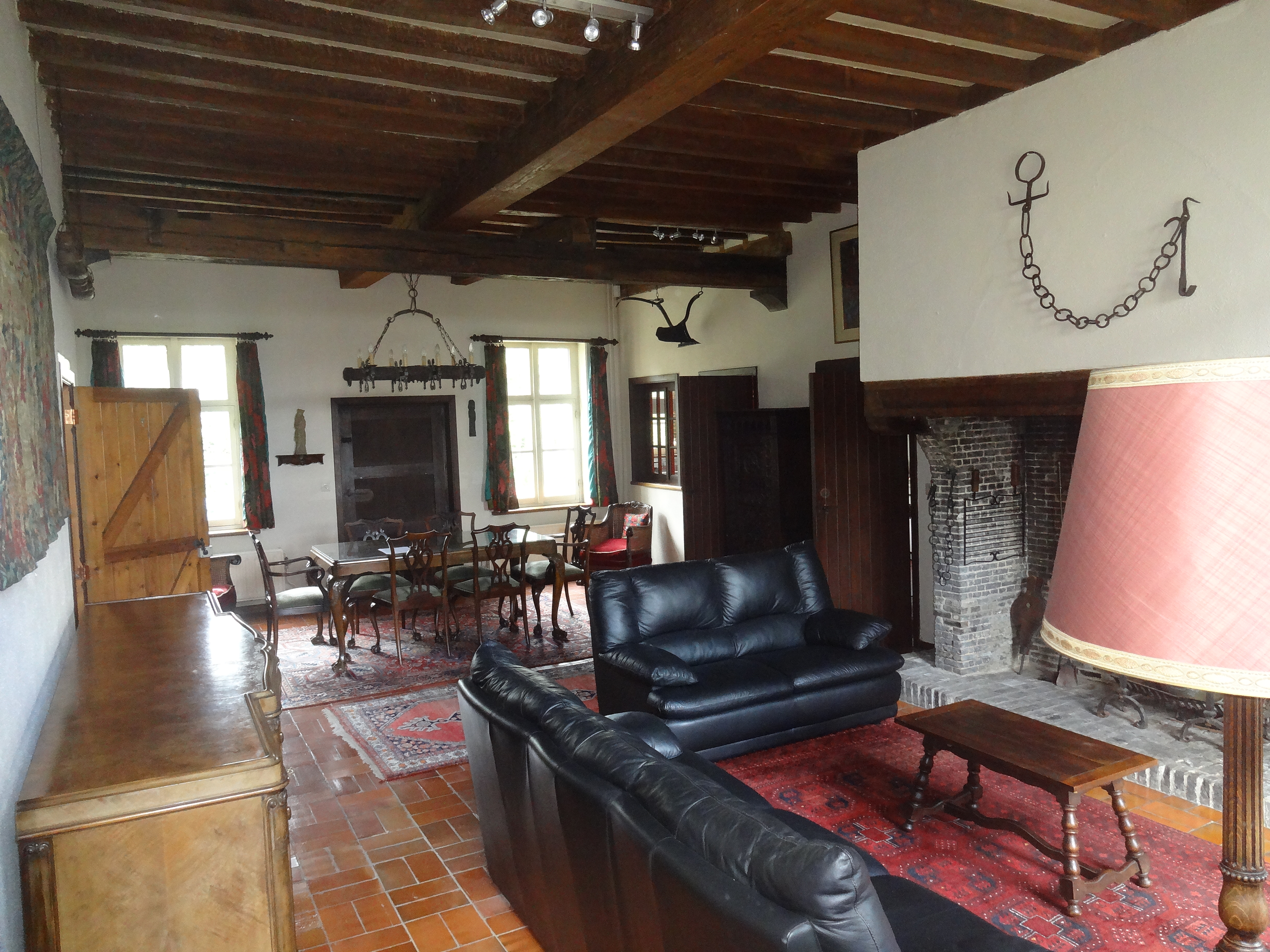

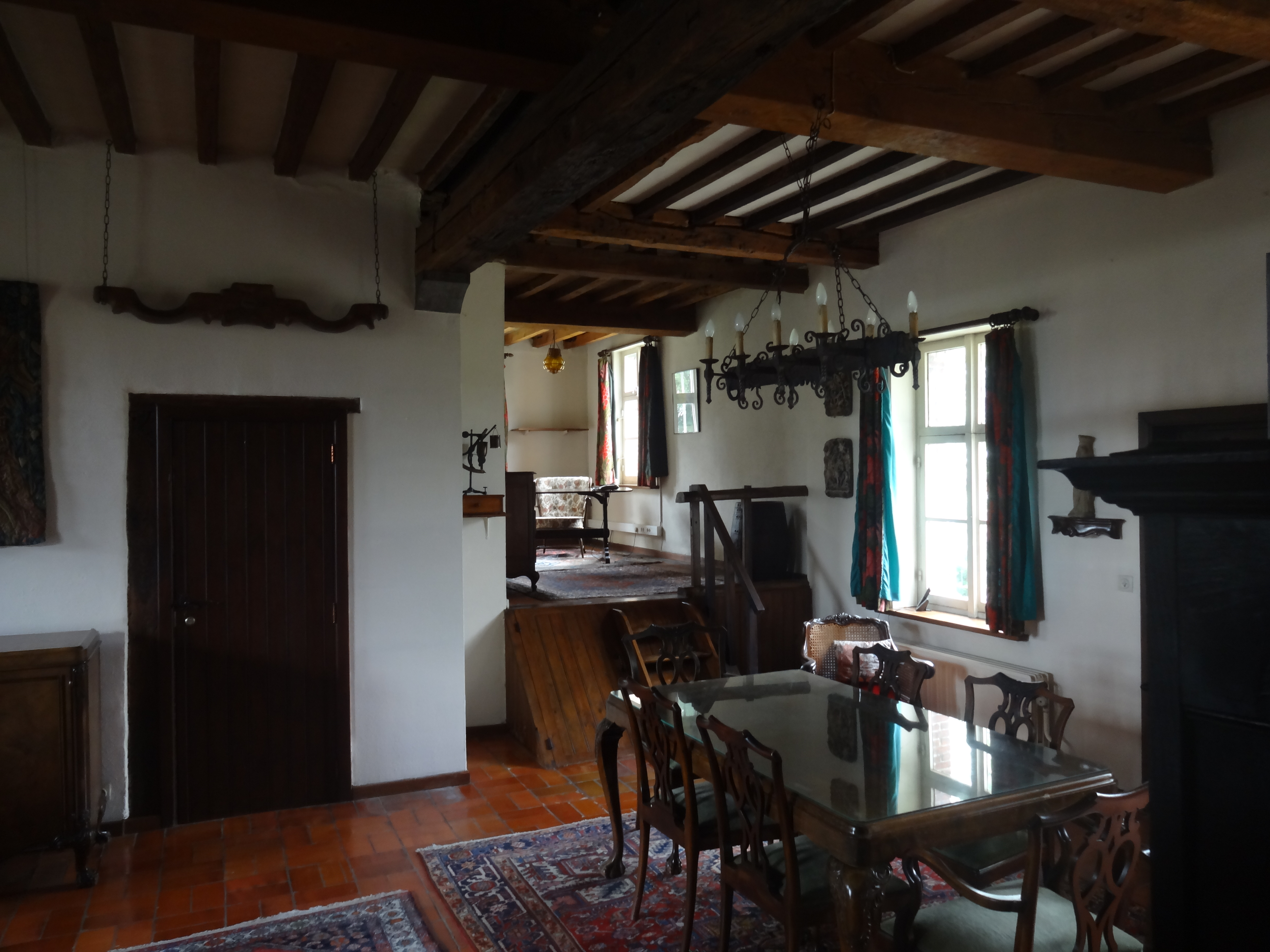
Rest of interior

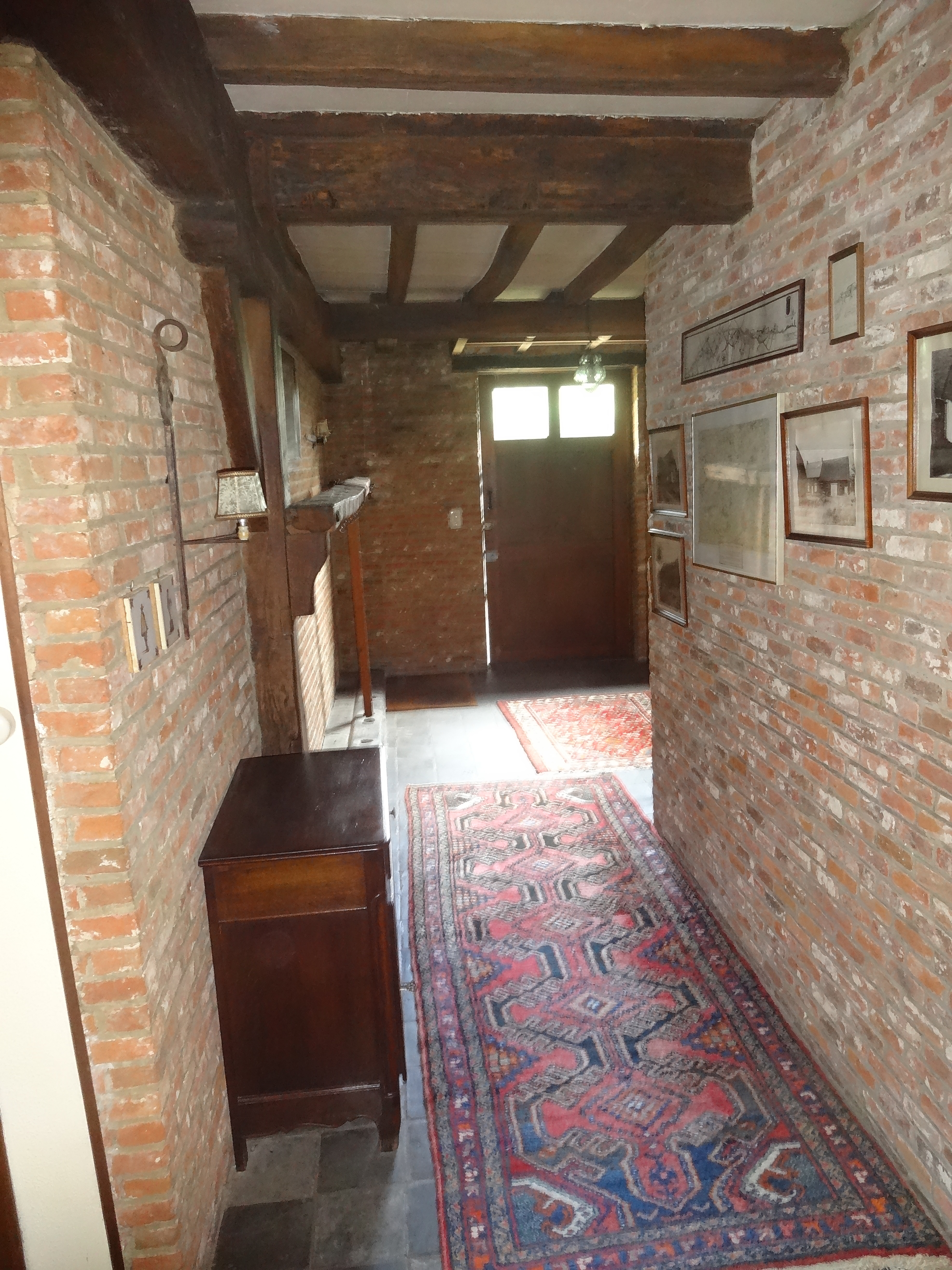
Entrance Hall

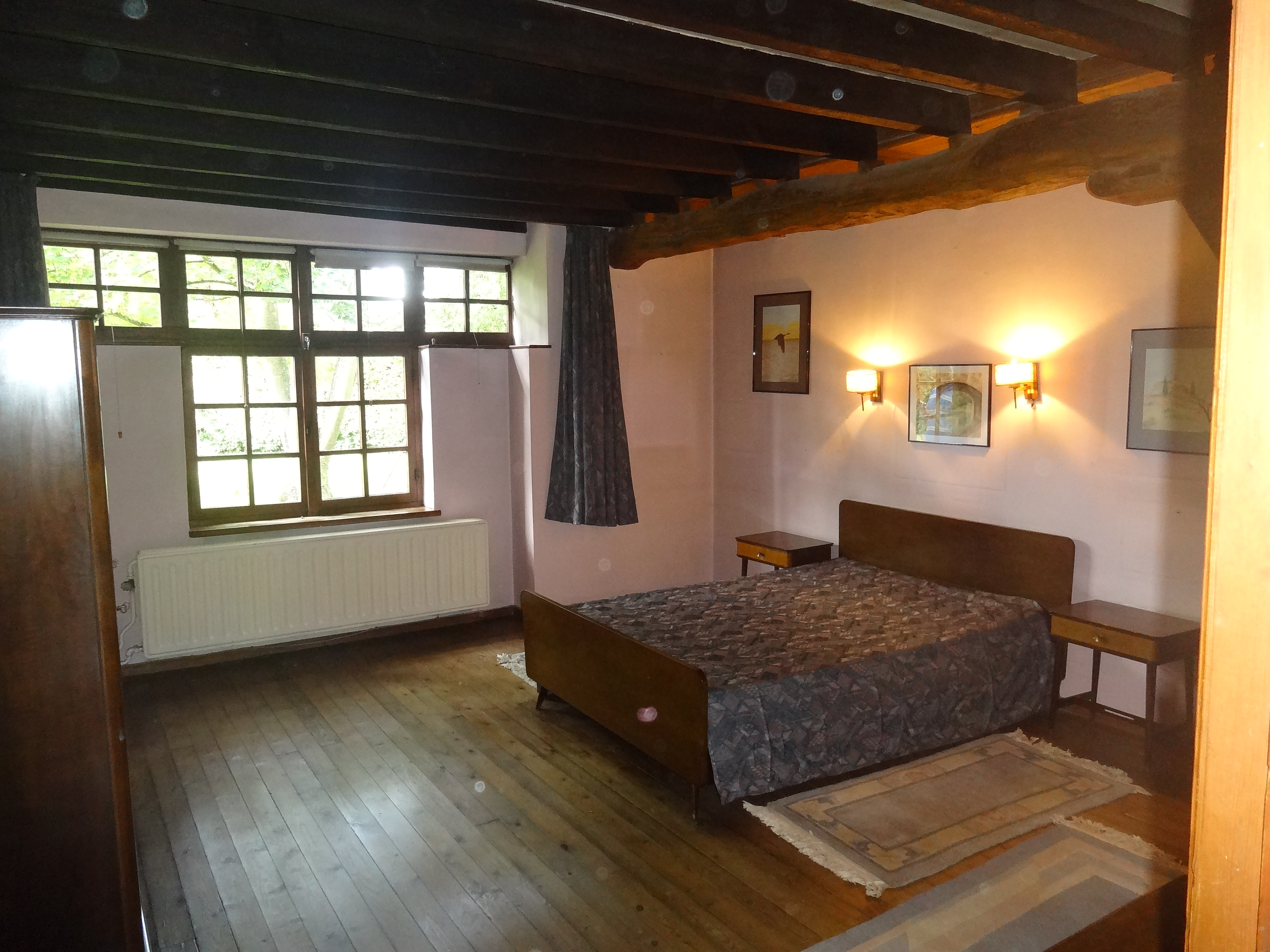
One of the bedrooms

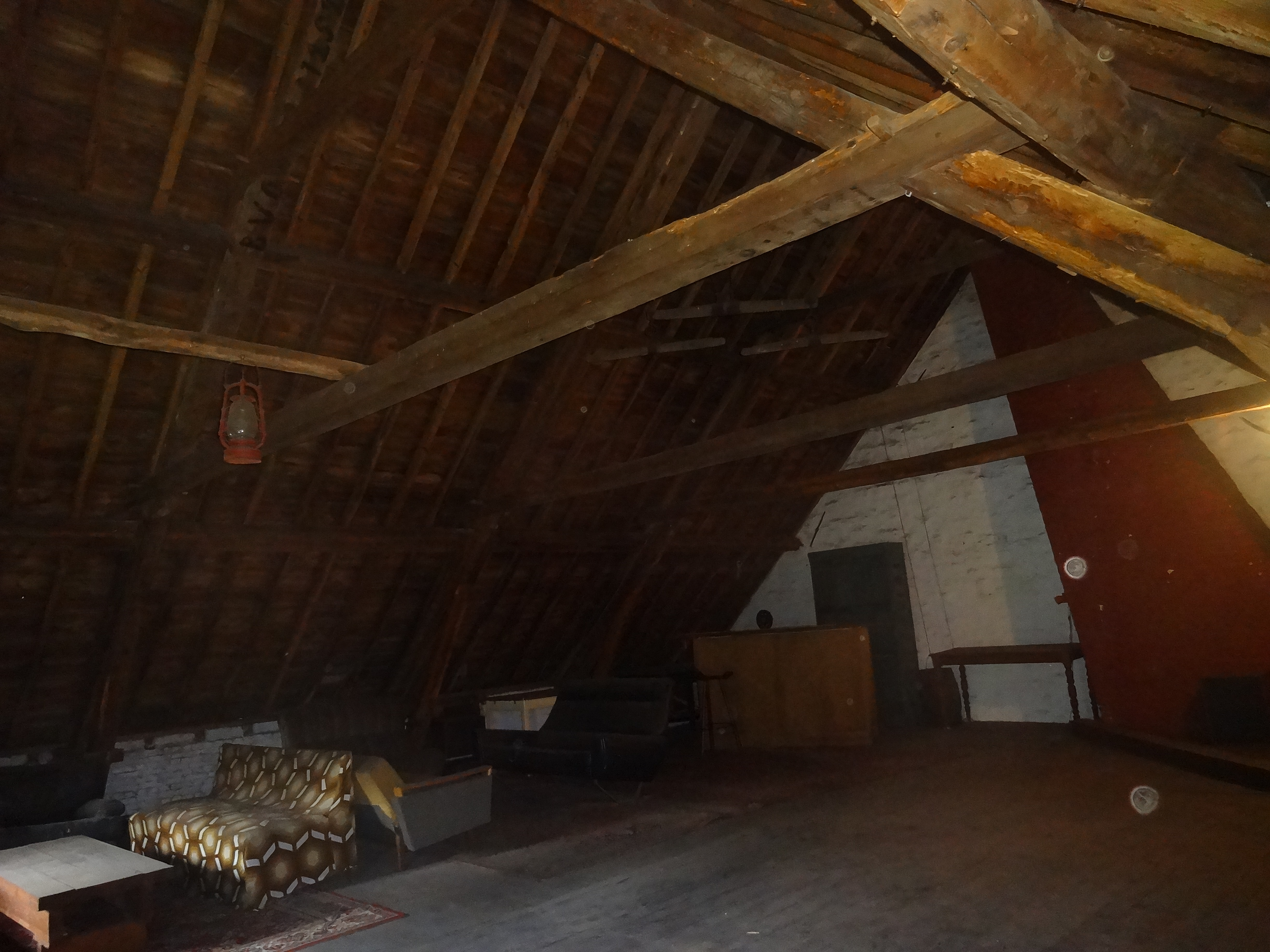
Hayloft
