= Boechout =

- Municipality
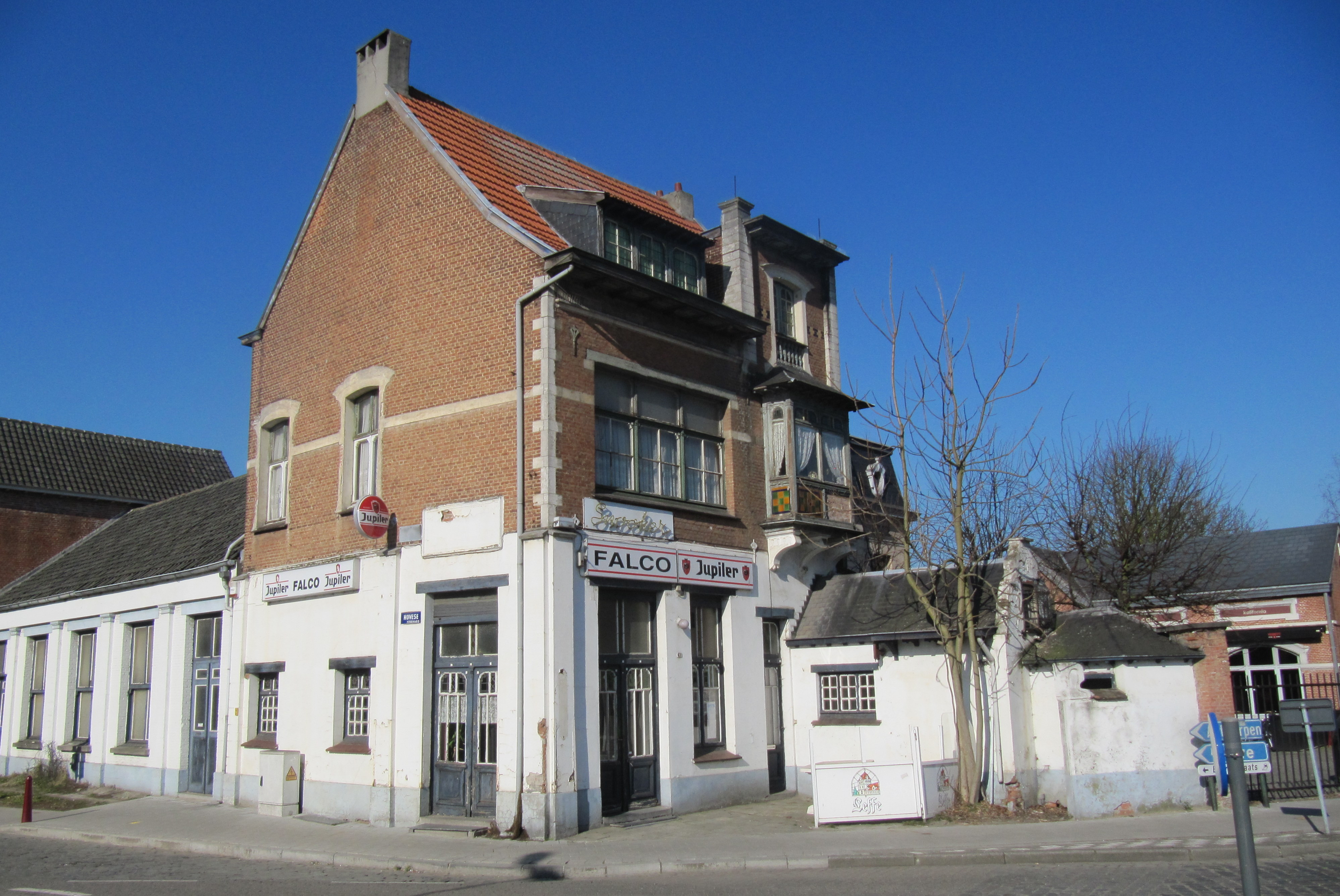

- Flag Coat of arms

- Location of Boechout in Antwerp
- Interactive map of Boechout
- Location in Belgium
- Coordinates: 51°09′N 04°29′E
- Country: Belgium
- Community: Flemish Community
- Region: Flemish Region
- Province: Antwerp
- Arrondissement: Antwerp

Government
  - Mayor: Koen T'Sijen (PRO Boechout&Vremde)
  - Governing parties: CD&V, PRO Boechout & Vremde, Groen-Gangmaker

Area
  - Total: 20.71 km^{2} (8.00 sq mi)

Population (2020-01-01)
  - Total: 13,372
  - Density: 645.7/km^{2} (1,672/sq mi)
- Postal codes: 2530, 2531
- NIS code: 11004
- Area codes: 03
- Website: www.boechout.be

Boechout (Dutch pronunciation: [ˈbuxʌut]) is a municipality of Belgium located in the Flemish province of Antwerp.

The municipality comprises the towns of Boechout proper and Vremde. In 2021, Boechout had a total population of 13,526. The total area is 20.66 km^{2}.

Boechout also hosts the Sfinks Festival.

== History ==
Boechout is first mentioned in 974 as Villa Buocholt and a possession of the Saint Bavo's Abbey in Ghent. It used to be part of the Duchy of Brabant. In 1357, Antwerp, Boechout, Hove and several other villages were acquired by the Count of Flanders, but was returned to Brabant in 1406. The village was severely damaged by war several times in the 16th century and again during World War I. In 1977, the municipality Vremde was merged into Boechout.

== Landmarks ==
- Schaliehoeve

== Climate ==
Climate data for Boechout (1991−2020 normals)
Month	Jan	Feb	Mar	Apr	May	Jun	Jul	Aug	Sep	Oct	Nov	Dec	Year
Mean daily maximum °C (°F)	6.6 (43.9)	7.6 (45.7)	11.1 (52.0)	15.3 (59.5)	18.9 (66.0)	21.7 (71.1)	23.7 (74.7)	23.6 (74.5)	20.0 (68.0)	15.3 (59.5)	10.3 (50.5)	7.0 (44.6)	15.1 (59.2)
Daily mean °C (°F)	3.9 (39.0)	4.3 (39.7)	6.9 (44.4)	10.2 (50.4)	14.0 (57.2)	16.9 (62.4)	19.0 (66.2)	18.6 (65.5)	15.3 (59.5)	11.3 (52.3)	7.2 (45.0)	4.4 (39.9)	11.0 (51.8)
Mean daily minimum °C (°F)	1.1 (34.0)	1.0 (33.8)	2.7 (36.9)	5.0 (41.0)	9.1 (48.4)	12.1 (53.8)	14.2 (57.6)	13.6 (56.5)	10.6 (51.1)	7.3 (45.1)	4.1 (39.4)	1.8 (35.2)	6.9 (44.4)
Average precipitation mm (inches)	70.4 (2.77)	62.1 (2.44)	55.8 (2.20)	42.4 (1.67)	58.1 (2.29)	73.3 (2.89)	78.6 (3.09)	84.6 (3.33)	72.5 (2.85)	66.0 (2.60)	77.5 (3.05)	90.8 (3.57)	832.1 (32.76)
Average precipitation days (≥ 1.0 mm)	12.3	11.1	10.4	8.6	9.6	9.9	10.3	10.4	9.6	10.8	12.4	13.7	129.2
Mean monthly sunshine hours	60	77	134	190	219	220	225	211	163	116	66	50	1,731
Source: Royal Meteorological Institute

== Notable people ==
- Jan Cockx (1891–1976), painter
- Jimmy De Jonghe (born 1992), footballer
- Roger Rosiers (born 1946), former professional road racing cyclist
- Jan Frans Willems (1793–1846), writer and father of the Flemish movement

== Gallery ==
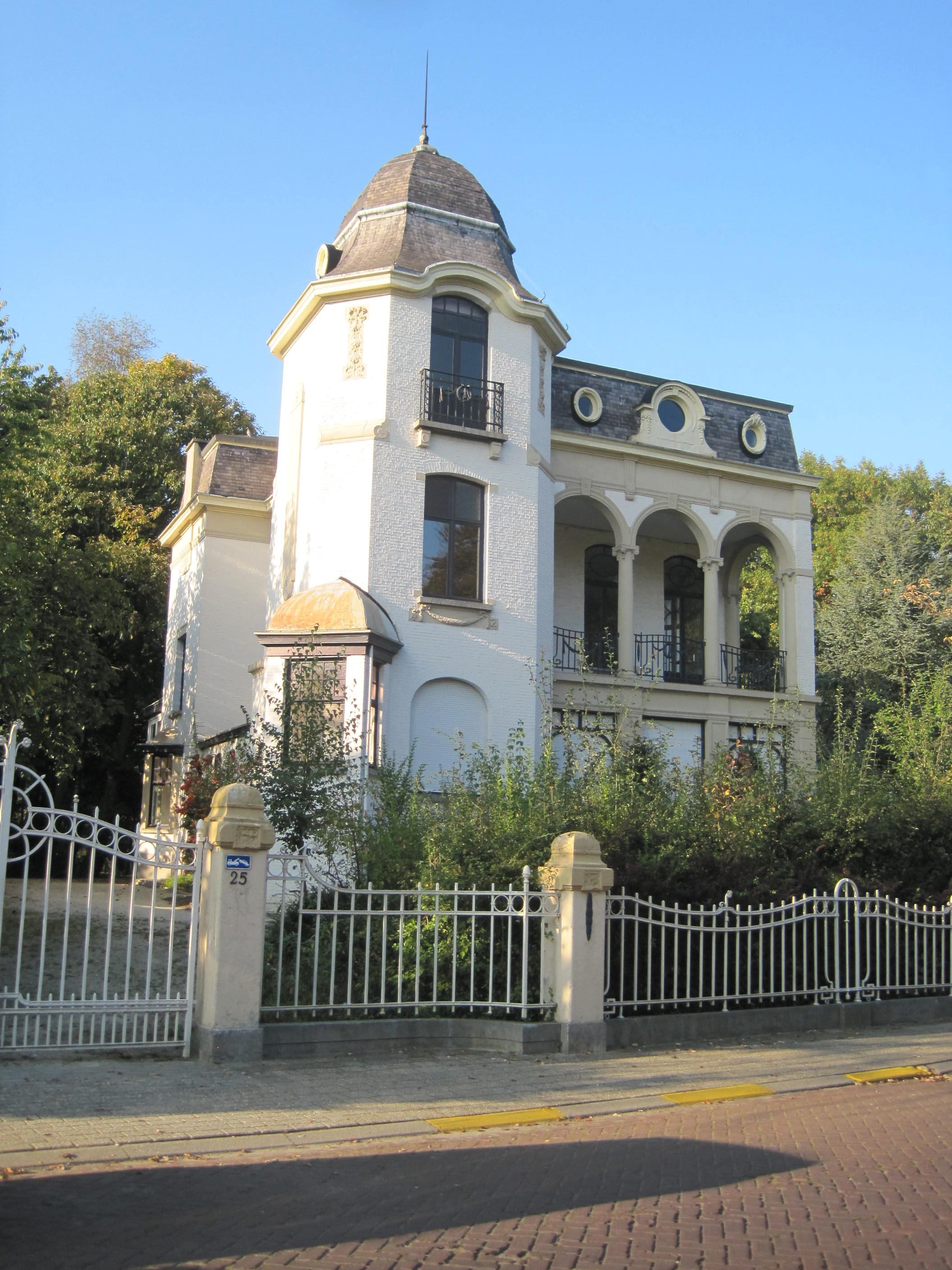
Villa in Boechout

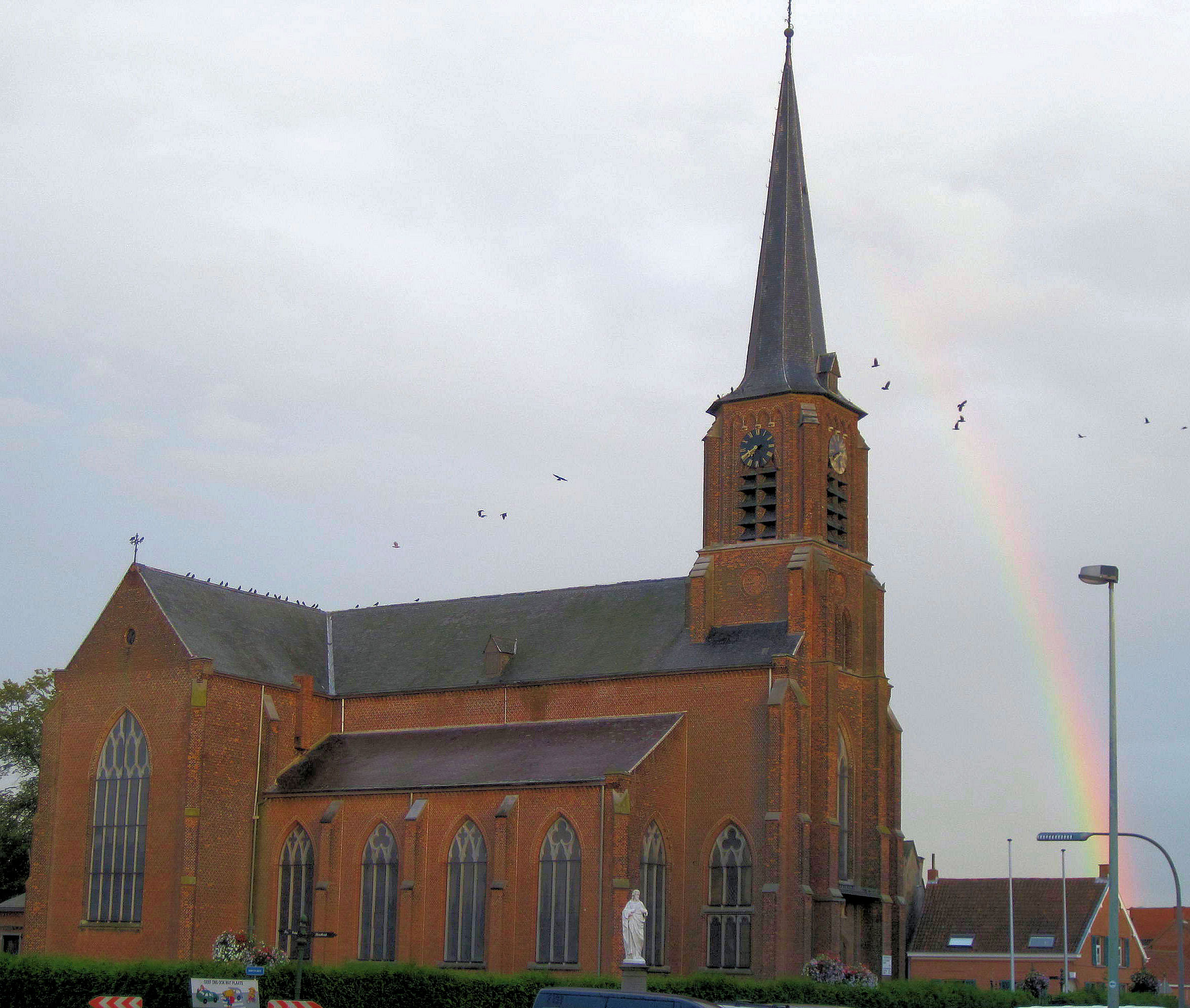
Sint-Jan-in-de-Oliekerk (Vremde)

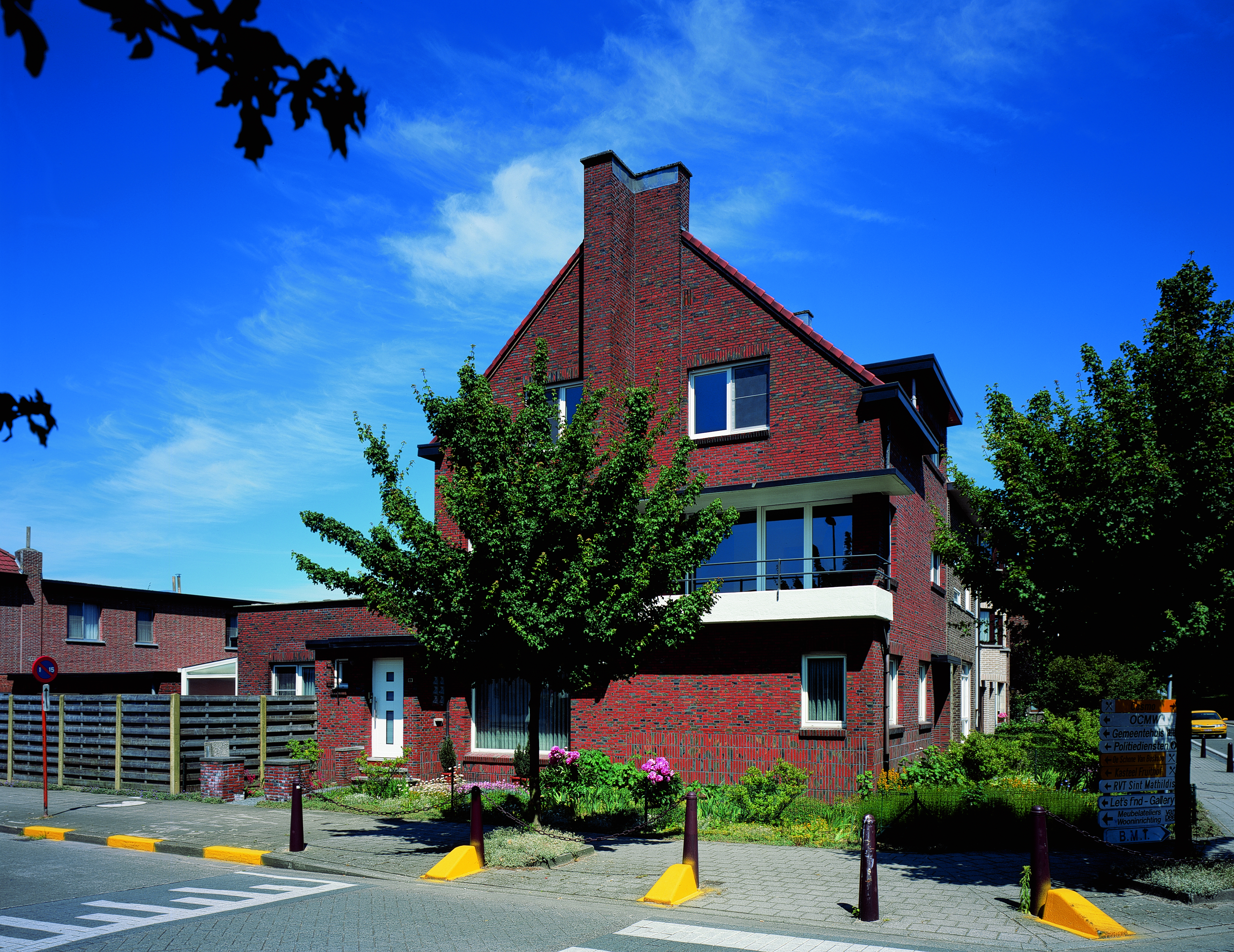
House in Boechout

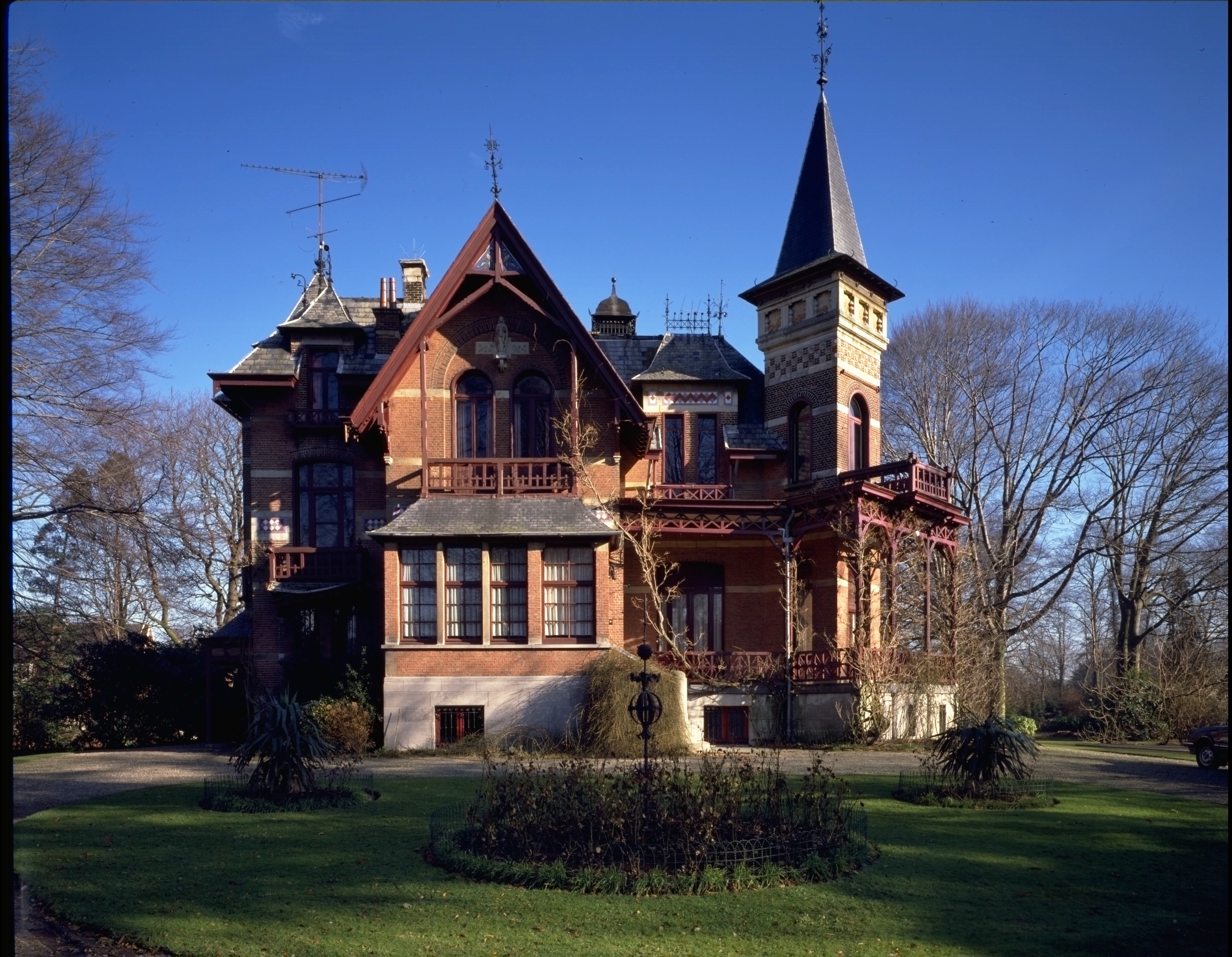
Villa "La Châtaigneraie" in Boechout
