= List of architects =

The following is a list of notable architects – well-known individuals with a large body of published work or notable structures, which point to an article in the English Wikipedia.

== Early architects ==
- Aa (Middle Kingdom), Egyptian
- Amenhotep, son of Hapu (14th c. BC), Egyptian
- Anthemius of Tralles (c. 474 – 533–558), Greek
- Apollodorus of Damascus (2nd c. AD), Damascus
- Aristobulus of Cassandreia (c. 375 – 301 BC), Greek
- Callicrates (mid-5th c. BC), Greek
- Hermodorus of Salamis (fl. 146–102 BC), Cypriot
- Hippodamus of Miletus (498–408 BC), Greek
- Ictinus (fl. mid-5th c. BC), Greek
- Imhotep (fl. late 27th c. BC), Egyptian
- Ineni (18th Dynasty of Egypt), Egyptian
- Isidore of Miletus (6th c. AD), Byzantine Greek
- Marcus Agrippa (63–12 BC), Roman
- Mnesicles (mid-5th c. BC), Athenian
- Rabirius (1st–2nd cc. AD), Roman
- Senemut (18th Dynasty of Egypt), Egyptian
- Vitruvius (c. 80–70 BC – post–15 BC), Roman
- Todos (6th-7th century), Armenian
- Yu Hao (喻皓, fl 970), Chinese
- Narasimhavarman II (695–729 CE), South India
- Perumthachan (9th c. AD), South India
- Trdat (c. 940 - 1020), Armenian

== 12th-century architects ==
- Abbot Suger (c. 1081–1151), French
- William the Englishman (1174 – c. 1214), English
- William of Sens (died 1180), French

== 13th-century architects ==
- Arnolfo di Cambio (c. 1240–1300/1310), Italian
- Villard de Honnecourt (fl. 13th c.), French
- Robert de Luzarches (fl. late 12th – early 13th c.), French
- Jean d'Orbais (c. 1175–1231), French
- Radovan (fl. 13th c.), Croatian

== 14th-century architects ==
- Filippo Calendario (died 1355), Venetian
- Jacopo Celega (died pre–1386), Italian
- Taddeo Gaddi (c. 1290–1366), Florentine
- Giotto di Bondone (c. 1267–1337), Florentine
- Anđeo Lovrov Zadranin (fl. mid–14th c.), Croatian
- Juraj Lovrov Zadranin (fl. 14th c.), Croatian
- Heinrich Parler (c. 1310–1371), German
- Johann Parler (c. 1359–1405/6), Bohemian
- Peter Parler (c. 1333–1399), Bohemian
- Wenzel Parler (c. 1360–1404), Bohemian

== 15th-century architects ==
- Leon Battista Alberti (1404–1472), Italian
- Andrea Alessi (1425–1505), Dalmatian
- Marko Andrijić (c. 1470 – post-1507), Dalmatian
- Donato Bramante (1444–1514), Italian
- Filippo Brunelleschi (1377–1446), Italian
- Mauro Codussi (1440–1504), Italian/Venetian
- Aristotele Fioravanti (c. 1415 or 1420 – c. 1486), Italian/Russian
- Niccolò di Giovanni Fiorentino (1418–1506), Italian/Dalmatian
- Juan Guas (c. 1430/1433 – c. 1496), Spanish
- Luciano Laurana (c. 1420–1479), Venetian
- Annibale Maggi detto Da Bassano (fl. 1490s), Venetian
- Paskoje Miličević (c. 1440–1516), Croatian
- Michelozzo Michelozzi (1396–1472), Italian
- Bernardo Rossellino (1409–1464), Italian
- Giorgio da Sebenico (c. 1410–1473), Venetian
- Jacob van Thienen (fl. early 15th c.), Flemish
- Leonardo da Vinci (1452–1519), Italian
- Garcia de Resende (1470–1536), Portuguese
- João de Castilho (c. 1470 – c. 1552), Castilian/Portuguese

== 16th-century architects ==
- Abramo Colorni, (1544–1599), Italian-Jewish
- Antonio Abbondi (fl. early 16th c.), Italian
- Galeazzo Alessi (1512–1572), Italian
- Bartolomeo Ammanati (1511–1592), Italian
- Michelangelo Buonarroti (1475–1564), Italian
- Girolamo Cassar (c. 1520 – c. 1592), Maltese
- Vittorio Cassar (c. 1550 – c. 1609), Maltese
- Guglielmo dei Grigi (1485–1550), Italian
- Nikolaus Gromann (1500–1566), German
- Juan de Herrera (1530–1597), Spanish
- Adam Kraft (1460–1509), German
- Francesco Laparelli (1521–1570), Italian
- Pirro Ligorio (1512–1583), Italian
- Philibert de l'Orme (1514–1570), French
- Giovanni Magenta (1565–1635), Italian
- Giovanni Vincenzo Casali (1539 – 1593), Florentine
- Hans Hendrik van Paesschen (c. 1510–1582), Flemish
- Andrea Palladio (1508–1580), Italian
- Antonio da Sangallo the Elder (c. 1453–1534), Italian
- Antonio da Sangallo the Younger (1484–1546), Italian
- Michele Sammicheli (1484–1559), Venetian
- Raffaello Santi (Raphael) (1483–1520), Italian
- Vincenzo Scamozzi (1548–1616), Italian
- Sebastiano Serlio (1475–1554), Italian
- Koca Mimar Sinan Agha (1489–1588), Ottoman
- Friedrich Sustris (1540–1599), Italian/Dutch
- Lambert Sustris (1518–1584), Dutch
- Pellegrino Tibaldi (1527–1596), Italian
- Giorgio Vasari (1511–1574), Italian
- Giacomo Barozzi da Vignola (1507–1573), Italian
- Postnik Yakovlev (fl. mid-16th c.), Russian
- Afonso Álvares (?- c.1580), Portuguese

== 17th-century architects ==
- Gian Lorenzo Bernini (1598–1680), Italian
- Francesco Borromini (1599–1667), Italian
- Ustad Ahmad Lahauri (fl. 17th c.), Indian
- Jacob van Campen (1596–1657), Dutch
- Pietro da Cortona (1596/1597–1669), Italian
- Jan Zygmunt Deybel (c. 1685–1752), German
- Johann Dientzenhofer (1663–1726), German
- Leonhard Dientzenhofer (1660–1707), German
- Tumas Dingli (1591–1666), Maltese
- Léopold Durand (1666–1746), French
- Pietro Paolo Floriani (1585–1638), Italian
- Lorenzo Gafà (1639–1703), Maltese
- Guarino Guarini (1624–1683), Italian
- Jules Hardouin-Mansart (1646–1708), French
- Elias Holl (1573–1646), German
- Inigo Jones (1573–1652), English
- Louis Le Vau (1612–1670), French
- Baldassarre Longhena (1598–1682), Italian
- Carlo Maderno (1556–1629), Italian
- François Mansart (1598–1666), French
- Johann Arnold Nering (c. 1659?–1695), German
- Francesco Antonio Picchiatti (1619–1694), Italian
- Matthäus Daniel Pöppelmann (1662–1736), German
- Carlo Rainaldi (1611–1691), Italian
- Andreas Schlüter (c. 1659–1714), German
- Nicodemus Tessin the Younger (1654–1728), Swedish
- John Webb (1611–1672), English
- Elizabeth Mytton Wilbraham (1632–1705), English
- Christopher Wren (1632–1723), English

== 18th-century architects ==
- Wilhelm Ludwig von Eschwege (1777–1855), German
- Eugénio dos Santos (1711–1760), Portuguese
- André Soares (1720–1769), Portuguese
- Robert Adam (1728–1792), Scottish
- William Adam (1689–1748), Scottish
- Cosmas Damian Asam (1686–1739), German
- Egid Quirin Asam (1692–1750), German
- Joseph Bonomi the Elder (1739–1808), Italian
- Étienne-Louis Boullée (1728–1799)
- William Buckland (1734–1774), English/American
- Colen Campbell (1676–1729), Scottish
- John Carr of York (1723–1807), English
- Richard Cassels (1690–1751), German
- William Chambers (1723–1796), Swedish/Scottish
- François de Cuvilliés (1695–1768), Netherlandish/German
- Christoph Dientzenhofer (1655–1722), German
- Kilian Ignaz Dientzenhofer (1689–1751), German
- Laurent-Benoît Dewez (1731–1812), Netherlandish
- John Douglas (c. 1709–1788), Scottish
- Nicolai Eigtved (1701–1754), Danish
- Johann Bernhard Fischer von Erlach (1656–1723), Austrian
- Johann Michael Fischer (1692–1766), German
- Pierre François Léonard Fontaine (1762–1853), French
- Ange-Jacques Gabriel (1698–1782), French
- Alessandro Galilei (1691–1737), Italian
- John Gwynn (1713–1786), English
- Abraham Hargrave (1755–1808), English/Irish
- Peter Harrison (1716–1775), American
- Nicholas Hawksmoor (1661–1736), English
- Johann Lukas von Hildebrandt (1668–1745), Austrian
- James Hoban (1755–1831), Irish/American
- John Hutchison, Scottish
- Thomas Ivory (1709–1779), English
- Nicolas-Henri Jardin (1720–1799), French (in Denmark)
- Thomas Jefferson (1743–1826), American
- Richard Jupp (1728–1799), English
- Filippo Juvarra (1678–1736), Italian
- Christopher Kempster (1627–1715), English
- William Kent (1685–1748), English
- Benjamin Latrobe (1764–1820), English/American
- João da Mata Chapuzet (1770–18429, Portuguese/Brazilian
- Claude-Nicolas Ledoux (1736–1806), French
- Giacomo Leoni (1686–1746), Italian
- Joseph Christian Lillie (1760–1827), Danish
- Johann Friedrich Ludwig (João Frederico Ludovice) (1673–1752), German
- Giorgio Massari (1687–1766), Italian
- Josef Munggenast (1680–1741), Austrian
- Robert Mylne (1733–1811), Scottish
- Ivan Fyodorovich Michurin (1700–1763), Russian
- Balthasar Neumann (c. 1687–1733), German
- Mateus Vicente de Oliveira (1706–86), Portuguese
- Giovanni Paolo Pannini (1691–1765), Italian
- Edward Lovett Pearce (1699–1733), Irish
- Charles Percier (1764–1838), French
- Giuseppe Piermarini (1734–1808), Italian
- Paolo Posi (1708–1776), Italian
- Jakob Prandtauer (1660–1726), Austrian
- Giacomo Quarenghi (1744–1817), Italian/Russian
- Joseph-Jacques Ramée (1764–1842), Italian
- Bartolomeo Rastrelli (1700–1771), Italian/Russian
- Charles Ribart (fl. 1776–1783), French
- Antonio Rinaldi (c. 1710–1794), Italian
- Nicola Salvi (1697–1751), Italian
- Thomas Sandby (1721–1798), English
- Jan Blažej Santini-Aichel (1677–1723), Austrian/Czech
- Michael Searles (1750–1813), English
- Jacques-Germain Soufflot (1713–1780), French
- Manuel Caetano de Sousa (1738–1802), Portuguese
- William Thornton (1759–1828), English/American
- Lauritz de Thurah (1706–1759), Danish
- Mary Townley (1753–1839), English
- Domenico Trezzini (1670–1734), Swiss/Italian
- John Vanbrugh (1664–1726), English
- Luigi Vanvitelli (1700–1773), Italian
- Bernardo Vittone (1704–1770), Italian
- John Wood, the Elder (1704–1754), English
- John Wood, the Younger (1728–1782), English
- James Wyatt (1746–1813), English
- Dominikus Zimmermann (1685–1766), German

== 19th-century architects ==
=== A–M ===
- Dankmar Adler (1844–1900), American
- Frank Shaver Allen (1860–1934), American
- Henry Austin (1804–1891), American
- Alphonse Balat (1819–1895), Belgian
- William Swinden Barber (1832–1908), English
- Sir Charles Barry (1795–1860), English
- Charles Barry Jr. (1823–1900), English
- Edward Middleton Barry (1830–1880), English
- Frédéric Auguste Bartholdi (1834–1904), French
- Carlo Bassi (1807–1856), Italian
- Asher Benjamin (1773–1845), American
- Hendrik Beyaert (1823–1894), Belgian
- Charles Bickel (1852–1921), American
- Joseph Blick (1867–1947), American
- Edward Blore (1787–1879), English
- Camillo Boito (1836–1914), Italian
- Ignatius Bonomi (1787–1870), English
- Ferdinando Bonsignore (1760–1843), Italian
- R. Newton Brezee (1851–1929), American
- Gridley James Fox Bryant (1816–1899), American
- David Bryce (1803–1876), Scottish
- Aleksandar Bugarski (1835–1891), Serbian
- Charles Bulfinch (1763–1844), American
- William Burges (1827–1881), English
- William Burn (1789–1870), Scottish
- John Burnside (1857–1920), New Zealander
- Decimus Burton (1800–1881), English
- J. Cleaveland Cady (1837–1919), American
- Carrère and Hastings (1885–1929), American
- Cesar Castellani (died 1905), Maltese
- Basil Champneys (1842–1935), English
- Edward Clark (1822–1902), American
- Adolf Cluss (1825–1905), American
- S. N. Cooke (1882–1964), English
- Lewis Cubitt (1799–1883), English
- Thomas Cubitt (1788–1855), English
- Pierre Cuypers (1827–1921), Dutch
- Alexander Jackson Davis (1803–1892), American
- George Devey (1820–1886), English
- John Dobson (1787–1865), English
- Thomas Leverton Donaldson (1795–1885), English
- Henry Engelbert (1826–1901), American
- Kolyu Ficheto (1800–1881), Bulgarian
- George A. Frederick (1842–1924), American
- Watson Fothergill (1841–1928), English
- James Fowler (1828–1892), English
- Thomas Fuller (1823–1898), Canadian
- Frank Furness (1839–1912), American
- Charles Garnier (1825–1898), French
- Friedrich von Gärtner (1791–1847), German
- Edward William Godwin (1833–1886), English
- George Enoch Grayson (1833–1912), English
- Samuel Hannaford (1835–1911), American
- Theophil Hansen (1813–1891), Danish/Austrian
- Philip Hardwick (1792–1870), English
- Philip Charles Hardwick (1822–1892), English
- William Alexander Harvey (1874–1951), English
- Thomas Hastings (1860–1929), American
- Sophia Hayden (1868–1953), American
- Philip Herapath (1823–1892), New Zealander
- Victor Horta (1861–1947), Belgian
- William Hosking FSA (1800–1861), English
- Heinrich Hübsch (1795–1863), German
- Samuel Huckel (1858–1917), American
- R. H. Hunt (1832–1937), American
- Richard Hunt (1827–1895), American
- Benno Janssen (1874–1964), American
- Giuseppe Jappelli (1783–1852), Italian
- William LeBaron Jenney (1832–1907), American
- Sir Horace Jones (1819–1887), English
- Emilijan Josimović (1823–1897), Serbian
- Abdallah Khan (fl. 1810–1850), Persian
- Leo von Klenze (1784–1864), German
- John A. B. Koch (1845–1928), Australian
- Henri Labrouste (1801–1875), French
- Barthelemy Lafon (1769–1820), American
- Richard Lane (1795–1880), English
- Benjamin Henry Latrobe (1764–1820), American
- Robert Lawson (1833–1902), New Zealander
- Henry Simpson Legg (1832–1906), English
- Charles F. Lembke (1865–1925), American
- Joseph Christian Lillie (1760–1827), Danish
- Alexander Wadsworth Longfellow Jr. (1854–1934), American
- Sara Losh (1785–1853), English
- Richard Lucae (1829–1879), German
- Charles-François Mandar (1757–1844), French
- Luigi Manini (1848–1936), Italian/Austrian
- Charles Follen McKim (1847–1909), American
- Samuel McIntire (1757–1811), American
- Edward Mahoney (1824 or 1825–1895), New Zealander
- Enrico Marconi (1792–1863), Italian
- Leandro Marconi (1834–1919), Polish
- Oskar Marmorek (1863–1909), Austro-Hungarian
- Frederick Marrable (1819–1872), English
- Robert Mills (1781–1855), American
- Josef Mocker (1835–1899), Bohemian
- Auguste de Montferrand (1786–1858), French
- Julia Morgan (1872–1957), American
- William Morris (1834–1906), English
- Alfred B. Mullett (1834–1890), American

=== N–Z ===
- John Nash (1752–1835), English
- Atanasije Nikolić (1803–1882), Serbian
- Joseph Maria Olbrich (1867–1908), Austrian
- Frederick Law Olmsted (1822–1903), American
- Frederick J. Osterling (1865–1934), American
- Edward Graham Paley (1823–1895), English
- Alexander Parris (1780–1852), American
- Joseph Paxton (1803–1865), English
- John Wornham Penfold (1828–1909), English
- Sir James Pennethorne, English
- Francis Penrose (1817–1903), English
- Friedrich Ludwig Persius (1803–1845), German
- Francis Petre (1847–1918), New Zealand
- Albert Pretzinger (b. 1863, death date unknown), American
- William Lightfoot Price (1855–1916), American
- Augustus Pugin (1812–1852), English
- E. W. Pugin (1834–1875), English
- Peter Paul Pugin (1851–1904), English
- Joseph-Jacques Ramée (1764–1842), French
- Charles Reed (1814–1859), English
- Charles Reeves (1815–1866), English
- James Renwick Jr. (1818–1895), American
- Henry Hobson Richardson (1838–1886), American
- Thomas Rickman (1776–1841), English
- Eduard Riedel (1813–1885), German
- Antonio Rivas Mercado (1853–1927), Mexican
- Robert S. Roeschlaub (1843–1923), American
- Isaiah Rogers (1800–1869), American
- John Root (1850–1891), American
- David Ross (1828–1908), Scottish/New Zealander
- Carlo Rossi (1775–1849), Italian/Russian
- Archimedes Russell (1840–1915), American
- Octave van Rysselberghe (1855–1929), Belgian
- John Holloway Sanders (1825–1884), English
- Frederick C. Sauer (1860–1942), German/American
- George Gilbert Scott (1811–1878), English
- George Gilbert Scott Jr. (1839–1897), English
- Karl Friedrich Schinkel (1781–1841), German
- Gottfried Semper (1803–1879), German
- Edmund Sharpe (1809–1877), English
- Joseph Lyman Silsbee (1848–1913), American
- Jacob Snyder (1823–1890), American
- John Soane (1848–1913), American
- August Soller (1805–1853), German
- Vasily P. Stasov (1769–1848), Russian
- J. J. Stevenson (1831–1908), Scottish
- Heinrich Strack (1805–1880), German
- George Edmund Street (1824–1881), English
- William Strickland (1788–1854), American
- Friedrich August Stüler (1800–1865), German
- Louis Sullivan (1856–1924), American
- Henry Tanner (1849–1935), English
- Thomas Alexander Tefft (1826–1859), American
- Thomas Telford (1757–1834), Scottish
- Samuel Sanders Teulon (1812–1873), English
- Constantine Andreyevich Ton (1794–1881), Russian
- Clair Tisseur (1827–1896), French
- Ithiel Town (1784–1844), American
- Silvanus Trevail (1851–1903), English
- William Tubby (1858–1944), American
- Richard Upjohn (1802–1878), English/American
- Calvert Vaux (1824–1925), English/American
- Eugène Viollet-le-Duc (1814–1879), French
- Otto Wagner (1841–1918), Austrian
- Thomas U. Walter (1804–1887), American
- Alfred Waterhouse (1830–1905), English
- George Webster (1797–1864), English
- John Dodsley Webster (1840–1913), English
- Stanford White (1853–1906), American
- William Wilkins (1778–1839), English
- Frederick Clarke Withers (1828–1901), English/American
- William Halsey Wood (1855–1897), American
- Thomas Worthington (1826–1909), English
- Thomas Henry Wyatt (1807–1880), Irish/English
- Edward Alexander Wyon (1842–1872), English
- Ammi B. Young (1798–1874), American
- Nikola Živković (1792–1870), Serbian

== 20th-century architects ==
=== A–C ===
- Alvar Aalto (1898–1976), Finland
- Richard Abbott (1883–1954), New Zealand
- Max Abramovitz (1908–2004), US
- David Adler (1882–1949), US
- Gerard Pieter Adolfs (1898–1968), Dutch East Indies
- Charles N. Agree (1897–1982), Detroit, Michigan, US
- Walter W. Ahlschlager (1887–1965), US
- Franco Albini (1905–1977), Italy
- Christopher Alexander (1936–2022), Austria
- Tadao Ando (born 1941), Japan
- Paul Andreu (1938–2018), France
- Edmund Anscombe (1874–1948), New Zealand
- Milan Antonović (1850–1929)
- Siah Armajani (1939–2020), Iran
- Raul de Armas (born 1941), Cuba
- João Batista Vilanova Artigas (1915–1985), Brazil
- Hisham N. Ashkouri (1948–2025), US
- Charles Herbert Aslin (1893–1959), UK
- Gunnar Asplund (1885–1940), Sweden
- Ian Athfield (1940–2015), New Zealand
- Fritz Auer (born 1933), Germany
- Gae Aulenti (1927–2012), Italy
- Carlo Aymonino (1926–2010), Italy
- Rafiq Azam, Bangladesh
- Laurie Baker (1917–2007), UK/India
- Sixto Durán Ballén (1921–2016), US
- Noel Bamford (1881–1952), New Zealand
- Lina Bo Bardi (1914–1992), Italy/Brazil
- Edward Larrabee Barnes (1915–2004), US
- Howard R. Barr (1910–2002), US
- Luis Barragán (1902–1988), Mexico
- Fred Bassetti (1917–2013), US
- Garry Baverstock (born 1949), Australia
- Geoffrey Bawa (1919–2003), Sri Lanka
- Isobel Hogg Kerr Beattie (1900–1970), UK
- Welton Becket (1902–1969), US
- Claud Beelman (1883–1963), US
- Adolf Behne (1885–1948), Germany
- Peter Behrens (1868–1940), Germany
- Pietro Belluschi (1899–1994), US
- Mordechai Benshemesh (1911–1993), Australia
- Hendrik Petrus Berlage (1856–1934), Netherlands
- Sigvald Berg (1894–1985), US
- Antonio Bilbao La Vieja (1892–1980), Argentina
- Titus de Bobula (1878–1961)
- Ricardo Bofill (1939–2022), Spain
- Oriol Bohigas (1925–2021), Spain
- Gottfried Böhm (1920–2021), Germany
- J. Max Bond Jr. (1935–2009), US
- Dariush Borbor (born 1934), Iran
- Mario Botta (born 1943), Switzerland
- Claude Fayette Bragdon (1866–1946), US
- C.A. "Peter" Bransgrove (1914–1966), Tanganyika/Tanzania
- Marcel Breuer (1902–1981), Hungary
- Halldóra Briem (1913–1993), Iceland
- Denise Scott Brown (born 1931), US
- Andrea Bruno (1931–2025), Italy
- Gordon Bunshaft (1909–1990), US
- John Burgee (born 1933), US
- Daniel Burnham (1846–1912), US
- Santiago Calatrava (born 1951), Spain
- Peter Calthorpe (born 1949), US
- Alberto Campo Baeza (born 1946), Spain
- Sir Hugh Casson (1910–1999), UK
- Judith Chafee (1932–1998), US
- James Chapman-Taylor (1958–1978), UK/New Zealand
- Ethel Charles (1871–1962), UK
- Jorge Ferreira Chaves (1920–1982), Portugal
- Ann R. Chaintreuil (born 1947), United States
- Chen Chi-kwan (1921–2007), Taiwan
- Cheng Tzu-tsai (born 1936), Taiwan
- Serge Chermayeff (1900–1996), Chechnya/UK
- David Chipperfield (born 1953), UK
- Wells Coates (1895–1958), UK/Canada
- Josep Antoni Coderch (1913–1984), Spain
- Charles A. Cofield, US
- Coleman Coker (born 1951), US
- Mary Colter (1869–1958), US
- Peter Cook (born 1936), UK
- Isadore (Issie) Coop (1926–2003), Canada
- Le Corbusier (1887–1965), Switzerland/France
- Ernest Cormier (1885–1980), Canada
- Charles Correa (1930–2015), India
- Lúcio Costa (1902–1998), Brazil
- Ralph Adams Cram (1863–1942), US
- Charles Howard Crane (1885–1952), US
- Paul Philippe Cret (1876–1945), France, US
- Louis Curtiss (1865–1924), US
- Kirtland Cutter (1860–1939), US

=== D–G ===
- Justus Dahinden (1925–2020), Switzerland
- Karl Damschen (born 1942), Germany
- Raimondo Tommaso D'Aronco (1857–1932), Italy
- Miša David (1942–2000), Yugoslavia
- Giancarlo De Carlo (1919–2005), Italy
- Frederic Joseph DeLongchamps (1882–1969), US
- François Deslaugiers (1934–2009), France
- Jack Diamond (1932–2022), South Africa/Canada
- Filipe Oliveira Dias (1963–2014), Portugal
- Theo van Doesburg (1883–1931), Netherlands
- B. V. Doshi (1927–2023), India
- Alden B. Dow (1904–1983), US
- Jane Drew (1911–1996), UK
- Andrés Duany (born 1949), US
- Max Dudler (born 1949), Switzerland/Germany
- Michael Middleton Dwyer (born 1954), US
- Willem Marinus Dudok (1884–1974), Netherlands
- Arthur Dyson (born 1940), US
- H. Kempton Dyson (1880–1944), UK
- Charles Eames (1907–1978), US
- Ray Eames (1912–1988), US
- John Eberson (1875–1964), Romania/US
- Peter Eisenman (born 1932), US
- George Grant Elmslie (1869–1952), US
- Richard England (born 1937), Malta
- Arthur Erickson (1924–2009), Canada
- Raymond Erith (1904–1973), US
- Aldo van Eyck (1918–1999), Netherlands
- Hassan Fathy (1900–1989), Egypt
- Sverre Fehn (1924–2009), Norway
- Arthur Fehr (1904–1969), US
- Hermann Finsterlin (1887–1973), Germany
- Theodor Fischer (1862–1938), Germany
- Harold H. Fisher (1901–2005), US
- Kay Fisker (1893–1965), Denmark
- O'Neil Ford (1905–1982), US
- Norman Foster (born 1935), UK
- Yona Friedman (1923–2020), Hungary/France
- Maxwell Fry (1899–1987), UK
- Buckminster Fuller (1895–1983), US
- Ignazio Gardella (1905–1999), Italy
- Antoni Gaudí (1852–1926), Spain
- Giuli Gegelia (1942–2025), Georgia
- Frank Gehry (1929–2025), Canada/US
- Haralamb H. Georgescu (1908–1977), Romania/US
- Heydar Ghiai (1922–1985), Iran
- Cass Gilbert (1859–1934), US
- Moisei Ginzburg (1892–1946), Belarus/USSR
- Romaldo Giurgola (1920–2016), Italy/US/Australia
- Hansjörg Göritz (born 1959), Germany
- Bruce Goff (1904–1982), US
- Ernő Goldfinger (1902–1987), Hungary/UK
- Teodoro Gonzalez de Leon (1926–2016), Mexico
- Bertram Goodhue (1869–1924), US
- Ferdinand Gottlieb (1919–2007), Germany/US
- Noemí Goytia (born 1936), Argentina
- Giorgio Grassi (born 1935), Italy
- Michael Graves (1934–2015), US
- Charles Sumner Greene (1868–1957), US
- Henry Mather Greene (1870–1954), US
- Jules Gregory (1920–1985), US
- Vittorio Gregotti (1927–2020), Italy
- Walter Burley Griffin (1876–1937), US
- Sir Nicholas Grimshaw (1939–2025), UK
- Walter Gropius (1883–1969), Germany
- Victor Gruen (1903–1980), Austria
- Hector Guimard (1867–1942), France

=== H–K ===
- Zaha Hadid (1950–2016), Iraq/UK
- Charles Haertling (1928–1984), US
- William John Hale (1862–1929), UK
- Robert Bell Hamilton (1892–1948), Australia
- Han Pao-teh (1934-2014), Taiwan
- Halfdan M. Hanson (1884–1952), US
- Bashirul Haq (1942–2020), Bangladesh
- Hugo Häring (1882–1958), Germany
- David M. Harper (born 1953), US
- Wallace Harrison (1895–1981), US
- Francis R. Heakes (1858–1930), Canada
- John Hejduk (1929–2000), US
- Herman Hertzberger (born 1932), Netherlands
- Heinz Hess (1922–1992), Germany
- Fernando Higueras (1930–2008), Spain
- Ludwig Hilberseimer (1885–1967), Germany
- G. Noel Hill (1893–1985), UK
- Herbert Hirche (1910–2002), Germany
- Harold Frank Hoar (1907–1976), UK
- Florence Fulton Hobson (1881–1978), Ireland
- Charles Holden (1875–1960), UK
- Hans Hollein (1934–2014), Austria
- Raymond Hood (1881–1934), US
- Sir Michael Hopkins (1935–2023), UK, 1994 RIBA Gold Medal winner
- Victor Horta (1861–1947), Belgium
- Hsia Chu-joe (born 1947), Taiwan
- Hsieh Ying-chun (born 1954), Taiwan
- Edith Hughes (1888–1971), UK
- A. R. Hye (1919–2008), Pakistan
- Friedensreich Hundertwasser (1928–2000), Austria
- Wilbur R. Ingalls Jr. (1923–1997), US
- Muzharul Islam (1923–2012), Bangladesh
- Arata Isozaki (1931–2022), Japan
- Mariam Issoufou (born 1979), Niger
- Arne Jacobsen (1902–1971), Denmark
- Hugh Newell Jacobsen (1929–2021), US
- Helmut Jahn (1940–2021), Germany/US
- Peter Janesch (born 1953), Hungary
- Benno Janssen (1874–1964), US
- Pierre Jeanneret (1896–1967), Switzerland
- Peder Vilhelm Jensen-Klint (1853–1930), Denmark
- Jon Jerde (1940–2015), US
- Philip Johnson (1906–2005), US
- Clarence H. Johnston Sr. (1859–1936), US
- E. Fay Jones (1921–2004), US
- Josep Maria Jujol (1879–1949), Spain
- Ryszard Jurkowski (born 1945), Poland
- Albert Kahn (1869–1942), US
- Fazlur Rahman Khan (1929–1982), Bangladesh
- Louis Kahn (1901/1902–1974), US
- Maxwell M. Kalman (1906–2009), Canada
- Louis Kamper (1861–1953), US
- Jan Kaplický (1937–2009), Czech/UK
- Katayama Tōkuma (1854–1917), Japan
- Oskar Kaufmann (1873–1956), Hungary
- Kendrick Bangs Kellogg (1934–2024), US
- Raymond M. Kennedy (1891–1976), US
- Hugh T. Keyes (1888–1963), US
- Nader Khalili (1936–2008), US
- Edward Killingsworth (1917–2004), US
- Kim Swoo-geun (1931–1986), South Korea
- Charles Klauder (1872–1938), US
- George Klenzendorff (1883–?), US
- Michel de Klerk (1884–1923), Netherlands
- Ralph Knott (1878–1929), UK
- Austin Eldon Knowlton (1909–2003), US
- Carl Koch (1912–1998), US
- Hans Kollhoff (born 1946), Germany
- Musa Konsulova (1921–2019), USSR, Ukraine
- Rem Koolhaas (born 1944), Netherlands
- Károly Kós (1883–1977), Hungary
- Johannes Krahn (1908–1974), Germany
- Piet Kramer (1881–1961), Netherlands
- Léon Krier (1946–2025), Luxembourg
- Kisho Kurokawa (1934–2007), Japan
- Edgar-Johan Kuusik (1888–1974), Estonia
- Ivan Sergeyevich Kuznetsov (1867–1942), Russia

=== L–M ===
- Thomas W. Lamb (1871–1942), US
- G. Albert Lansburgh (1876–1969), US
- Eve Laron OAM (1931–2009), Australia
- Henning Larsen (1925–2013), Denmark
- Sir Denys Lasdun (1914–2001), UK
- Vilhelm Lauritzen (1894–1984), Denmark
- John Lautner (1911–1994), US
- Ricardo Legorreta (1931–2011), Mexico
- William Lescaze (1896–1969), US
- Jan Letzel (1880–1925), Czechoslovakia
- Amanda Levete (born 1955), UK
- Sigurd Lewerentz (1885–1975), Sweden
- Liang Sicheng (1901–1972), China
- Adalberto Libera (1903–1963), Italy
- Daniel Libeskind (born 1946), Poland/US
- João Filgueiras Lima (1931–2014), Brazil
- Maya Lin (born 1959), US
- El Lissitzky (1890–1941), Russia
- Gordon W. Lloyd (1832–1905), US
- Leandro Locsin (1928–1994), Philippines
- Elmar Lohk (1901–1963), Estonia
- Adolf Loos (1870–1933), Austria/Czechoslovakia
- Berthold Lubetkin (1901–1990), UK/USSR
- Bill Lucas (1924–2001), Australia
- Hans Luckhardt (1890–1954), Germany
- Wassili Luckhardt (1889–1972), Germany
- Owen Luder (1928–2021), UK
- Edwin Lutyens (1869–1944), UK
- Ivar Lykke (born 1941), Norway
- George Washington Maher (1864–1926), US
- Fumihiko Maki (1928–2024), Japan
- Charles Rennie Mackintosh (1868–1928), UK
- Imre Makovecz (1935–2011), Hungary
- Robert Mallet-Stevens (1886–1945), France
- Angelo Mangiarotti (1921–2012), Italy
- George R. Mann (1856–1939), US
- Robert Matthew (1906–1975), UK
- George D. Mason (1856–1948), US
- Edward Maufe (1883–1974), UK
- Bernard Maybeck (1862–1957), US
- Wayne McAllister (1907–2000), US
- Raymond McGrath (1903–1977), UK/Ireland
- Roy Mason (1938–1996), US
- François Massau, Belgium
- Richard Meier (born 1934), US
- Konstantin Melnikov (1890–1974), USSR
- Erich Mendelsohn (1887–1953), Germany
- Paulo Mendes da Rocha (1928–2021), Brazil
- Henry Mercer (1856–1930), US
- Geoffrey Harley Mewton (1905–1998), Australia
- Johan van der Mey (1878–1949), Netherlands
- Hannes Meyer (1889–1954), Switzerland
- Giovanni Michelucci (1891–1990), Italy
- Ludwig Mies van der Rohe (1886–1969), Germany/USA
- Andrés Mignucci (1957–2022), Puerto Rico
- Vlado Milunić (1941–2022), Czech Republic
- James Rupert Miller (1869–1946), US
- Dom Mintoff (1916–2012), Malta
- F. A. Minuth, American, New York City
- Hadi Mirmiran (1945–2006), Iran
- Enric Miralles (1955–2000), Spain
- Antonio Miró Montilla (born 1937), Puerto Rico
- Samuel Mockbee (1944–2001)
- Erik Møller (1909–2002)
- Rafael Moneo (born 1937), Spain
- Roger Montgomery (1925–2003), US
- Adolfo Moran (1953–2024), Spain
- Riccardo Morandi (1902–1989), Italy
- Luigi Moretti (1907–1973), Italy
- Arthur Cotton Moore (1935–2022), US
- Charles Willard Moore (1925–1993), US
- Lester S. Moore (1871–1924), US
- Julia Morgan (1872–1957), US
- Raymond Moriyama (1929–2023), Canada
- Eric Owen Moss (born 1943), US
- Michel Mossessian (born 1959), France/UK
- Frederick Augustus Muhlenberg (1887–1980), US
- Glenn Murcutt (born 1936), Australia
- C. F. Møller (1898–1988), Denmark
- Barton Myers (born 1934), Canada

=== N–R ===
- Robert Natus (1890–1950)
- Pier Luigi Nervi (1891–1979), Italy
- Peter Newell (1916–2010), Australia
- Richard Neutra (1892–1970)
- Ngo Viet Thu (1926–2000), Vietnam
- Oscar Niemeyer (1907–2012)
- Enamul Karim Nirjhar (born 1962), Bangladesh
- Oscar Nitzchke (1900–1991)
- Percy Erskine Nobbs (1875–1964)
- Samuel Tilden Norton (1877–1959)
- Ellice Nosworthy (1897–1972), Australia
- Jean Nouvel (born 1945)
- Martin Nyrop (1849–1921), Denmark
- Gyo Obata (1923–2022)
- Samuel Oghale Oboh (born 1971) Canada / Nigeria
- John J. O'Malley (1915–1970), US
- Yafes Osman (born 1946), Bangladesh
- Frei Otto (1925–2015)
- Charles Souders Paget (1874–1933), America / China
- J.J.P. Oud (1890–1963)
- Félix Candela Outeriño (1910–1997), Spain/Mexico
- Paul Paget (1901–1985)
- Henry (Harry) Paley (1859–1946)
- Mustapha Khalid Palash (born 1963), Bangladesh
- Mihály (Michael) Párkányi (1924–1991) Hungary
- John and Donald Parkinson (1861–1945)
- John Pawson (born 1949)
- Arthur Peabody (1858–1942)
- I. M. Pei (1917–2019)
- César Pelli (1926–2019)
- Hubert Petschnigg (1913–1997)
- Frits Peutz (1896–1974)
- Timothy L. Pflueger (1892–1946)
- Renzo Piano (born 1937), Italy
- Stjepan Planić (1900–1980)
- Jože Plečnik (1872–1957)
- Hans Poelzig (1869–1936)
- Gino Pollini (1903–1991), Italy
- James Polshek (1930–2022)
- Donald Perry Polsky (1928–2021)
- Gio Ponti (1891–1979)
- John Russell Pope (1874–1937)
- John Portman (1924–2017)
- Christian de Portzamparc (born 1944), France
- George B. Post (1837–1913), US
- Fernand Pouillon (1912–1986), France
- Henry Price (1867–1944)
- Alain Provost (born 1938)
- Freeman A. Pretzinger
- William Gray Purcell (1880–1965), US
- C. W. Rapp (1860–1926), US
- George L. Rapp (1878–1941), US
- Isaac Rapp (1854–1933), US
- Ralph Rapson (1914–2008)
- Steen Eiler Rasmussen (1898–1990)
- Antonin Raymond (1888–1976), Japan/US
- William J. Reese (1943–2011), US
- Affonso Eduardo Reidy (1909–1964), Brazil
- Sir Charles Herbert Reilly (1874–1948)
- Sir Albert Richardson (1880–1964)
- Gerrit Rietveld (1888–1964)
- Isabel Roberts (1871–1955), US
- Harry G. Robinson III (born 1942)
- Kevin Roche (1922–2019)
- Ernesto Nathan Rogers (1909–1969)
- Richard Rogers (1933–2021)
- Mario Romañach (1917–1984), Cuba
- Aldo Rossi (1931–1997), Italy
- Wirt C. Rowland (1878–1946)
- Paul Rudolph (1918–1997)
- Robert Tor Russell (1888–1972)
- Kerttu Rytkönen (1895–1991), Finland

=== S–Z ===
- Eero Saarinen (1910–1961), Finland
- Eliel Saarinen (1873–1950), Finland
- Eugen Sacharias (1906–2002)
- Moshe Safdie (born 1938)
- Paul Saintenoy (1862–1952)
- Cathy Saldaña (born 1966), Philippines
- Rogelio Salmona (1929–2007), Spain/Colombia
- Guðjón Samúelsson (1887–1950), Iceland
- João Santa-Rita (born 1960)
- Carlos A. Santos-Viola (1912–1994)
- Louis Sauer (born 1928)
- Carlo Scarpa (1906–1978)
- Hans Scharoun (1893–1972)
- Rudolf Schindler (1887–1953)
- Paul Schmitthenner (1884–1972)
- Fritz Schumacher (architect) (1869-1947), Germany
- Margarete Schütte-Lihotzky (1897–2000)
- Frederic Schwartz (1951–2014)
- Elisabeth Scott (1898–1972), UK
- Giles Gilbert Scott (1880–1960)
- Harry Seidler (1923–2006)
- Richard Seifert (1910–2001)
- Joseph Lluís Sert (1902–1983)
- H. Craig Severance (1879–1941)
- Hooshang Seyhoun (1920–2014), Iran
- Arpan Shah (born 1975), Indian
- Alexey Shchusev (1873–1949)
- Richard Sheppard (1910–1982)
- Vladimir Shukhov (1853–1939)
- Claudio Silvestrin (born 1954)
- Alvaro Siza (born 1933), Portugal
- Howard Dwight Smith (1886–1958)
- George Washington Smith (1876–1930)
- Alison Smithson (1928–1993)
- Peter Smithson (1923–2003)
- Charles B. J. Snyder (1860–1945), US
- Paolo Soleri (1919–2013), Italy
- Alejandro de la Sota (1913–1996)
- Eduardo Souto de Moura (born 1952), Portugal
- Albert Speer (1905–1981)
- Basil Spence (1907–1976)
- Johann Otto von Spreckelsen (1929–1987)
- Sheila Sri Prakash (born 1955), India
- William L. Steele (1875–1949), US
- Andrew Steiner (1908–2009), Czechoslovak-American
- Rudolf Steiner (1861–1925)
- Joseph Allen Stein (1912–2001), US, India
- Robert A.M. Stern (1939–2025)
- John Calvin Stevens (1855–1940), US
- Sir James Stirling (1926–1992)
- Edward Durrell Stone (1902–1978)
- James Strutt (1924–2008), Canada
- Joseph Sunlight (1889–1978)
- Kimiko Suzuki (1929–1992), Japan
- Roger Taillibert (1926–2019)
- Benedetta Tagliabue (born 1963), Italy, co-founder of EMBT
- Alexander Tamanyan (1878–1936), Armenia
- Kenzo Tange (1913–2005)
- Bruno Taut (1880–1938)
- Max Taut (1884–1967)
- Giuseppe Terragni (1904–1943)
- Quinlan Terry (born 1937)
- Heinrich Tessenow (1876–1950), German
- Benjamin C. Thompson (1918–2002)
- Edmund von Trompowsky (1851–1919), Latvia
- Horace Trumbauer (1868–1938)
- Bernard Tschumi (born 1944)
- Gilbert Stanley Underwood (1890–1960)
- Jørn Utzon (1918–2008), Denmark
- Attilia Vaglieri (1891–1969), Italy
- Vann Molyvann (1926–2017), Cambodia
- François Valentiny (born 1953), Luxembourg
- William van Alen (1883–1954)
- Henry Van de Velde (1863–1957)
- Henri van Dievoet (1869–1931)
- Antoine Varlet (1893–1940)
- Robert Venturi (1925–2018)
- Miguel Vila Luna (1943–2005), Dominican Republic
- Carlos Raúl Villanueva (1900–1975)
- Rafael Viñoly (1944–2023)
- Roland Wank (1898–1970)
- Paul Waterhouse (1861–1924), UK
- Carlo Weber (1934–2014)
- W. H. Weeks (1864–1936)
- Carl Westman (1866–1936)
- Paul Williams (1894–1980)
- Clough Williams-Ellis (1883–1978)
- Jan Wils (1891–1972)
- George J. Wimberly (1914–1996)
- James Wines (born 1932), US
- Geoffrey Wooding (1954–2010)
- Lebbeus Woods (1940–2012), US
- Frank Lloyd Wright (1867–1959), US
- Marcellus E. Wright Sr. (1881–1962), US
- Minoru Yamasaki (1912–1986)
- F. R. S. Yorke (1906–1962), UK
- Jean-François Zevaco (1916–2003)
- Milan Zloković (1898–1965)
- Peter Zumthor (born 1943), Switzerland

== 21st-century architects ==
=== A–D ===
- Michel Abboud (born 1977), Lebanon
- Olajumoke Adenowo (born 1968), Nigeria
- David Adjaye (born 1966), Tanzania
- Basil Al Bayati (born 1946), UK
- Hossein Amanat (born 1942), Iran
- Hidetsugu Aneha (born 1957), Japan
- Ron Arad (born 1951), Israel
- Wiel Arets (born 1955), Netherlands
- Rafiq Azam, Bangladesh
- Shigeru Ban (born 1957), Japan
- Carol Ross Barney (born 1949), US
- Christopher Charles Benninger (1942–2024), India
- Tatiana Bilbao, Mexico
- Stefano Boeri, Italy
- Stephan Braunfels (born 1950), Germany
- Robby Cantarutti (born 1966), Italy
- Marco Casagrande (born 1971), Finland
- Alexandre Chan
- Christina Cho, Australia
- Kees Christiaanse (born 1953), Netherlands
- Antonio Citterio (born 1950), Italy
- Denise Civil (living), New Zealand
- Terence Conran (1931–2020), UK
- Hafeez Contractor (born 1950), India
- Sue Courtenay, Belize
- Lise Anne Couture (born 1959), Canada
- Odile Decq, (born 1955), France
- Thomas Doerr (born 1964), US
- Joe Doucet, US
- Roger Duffy
- Michael Middleton Dwyer, US

=== E–G ===
- Erick van Egeraat (born 1956), Netherlands
- Peter Eisenman (born 1932), US
- Günay Erdem (born 1978, Bulgaria), Turkey
- Sunay Erdem (born 1971, Bulgaria), Turkey
- Peter Exley, US
- Sir Terry Farrell, UK
- Norman Foster, (born 1935), UK
- Eric Corey Freed (born 1970)
- Tony Fretton (born 1945), UK
- Sou Fujimoto (born 1971), Japan
- Massimiliano Fuksas, Italy
- Jeanne Gang (born 1964), US
- James Garrison (born 1963), US
- Dominique Gauzin-Müller (born 1960), France
- Nabil Gholam (born 1962), Lebanon
- Sean Godsell (born 1960), Australia
- T. J. Gottesdiener
- Michael Green, Canada
- Keith Griffiths (born 1954), UK

=== H–M ===
- Zaha Hadid (1950–2016), UK
- Ivan Harbour (born 1962), UK
- David M. Harper (born 1953)
- Craig W. Hartman
- Arif Hasan (born 1943), Pakistan
- Gregory Henriquez (born 1963), Canada
- David Randall Hertz (born 1960), US
- Thomas Herzog (born 1941)
- H. R. Hiegel
- Jonathan Hill (1958–2023), UK
- Eric Ho (living), US
- Steven Holl (born 1947), US
- Bjarke Ingels (born 1974), Denmark
- Christoph Ingenhoven (born 1960), Germany
- Jun'ya Ishigami (born 1974), Japan
- Mariam Issoufou (born 1979), Niger
- Toyo Ito (born 1941), Japan
- Hermann Kamte (born 1992), Cameroon
- Kevin Kennon
- Pouya Khazaeli (born 1975), Iran
- Bernard Khoury (born in 1969), Lebanon
- Atsushi Kitagawara (born 1951), Japan
- Sunita Kohli (born 1946), India
- Rem Koolhaas (born 1944), Netherlands
- Kengo Kuma
- Tom Kundig
- Raffaella Laezza, Italy
- Jimenez Lai
- Daniel Libeskind (born 1946, Poland), US
- Maya Lin, US
- Jing Liu
- Greg Lynn
- Kamel Mahadin (born 1954), Jordan
- Nzinga Biegueng Mboup, Senegal
- Philippe Maidenberg (born 1966), France
- Michael Maltzan (born 1959), US
- Prathima Manohar (living), US
- Andy Martin (born 1963)
- Thom Mayne
- William McDonough
- Adolfo Moran
- Toshiko Mori, Japan

=== N–Z ===
- Florent Nédélec
- Enamul Karim Nirjhar
- Samuel Oghale Oboh (born 1971), Canada/Nigeria
- Liz Ogbu
- Neri Oxman
- Patricia Patkau
- Satyendra Pakhale (born 1967), India
- Mustapha Khalid Palash
- Eugene Pandala (born 1954), India
- Bimal Patel (born 1961), India
- Thomas Phifer
- Renzo Piano, Italy
- Dimitris Potiropoulos
- Antoine Predock
- Joshua Prince-Ramus
- Dy Proeung, Cambodia
- Philippe Rahm (born 1967)
- Richard Rogers, UK
- Fernando Romero, Mexico
- Lawrence Scarpa
- Tatjana Schneider, Germany
- Kazuyo Sejima (born 1956), Japan
- Shirley Shen, Canada
- Adrian Smith
- Galia Solomonoff
- Sheila Sri Prakash (born 1955), India
- Paul Steelman (born 1955), US
- Jörg Stollmann, Germany
- Marshall Strabala
- Sergei Tchoban (born 1962), Russian-born architect
- Jack Travis (born 1952), US
- Victor Vechersky (born 1958), Ukraine
- Wang Shu (born 1963), China
- Ross Wimer
- Wilfried van Winden (born 1955)
- Gert Wingårdh (born 1951), Sweden
- Jun Xia, China
- Ken Yeang (born 1948), Malaysia

== Mythological/fictional architects ==
Several architects occur in worldwide mythology, including Daedalus, builder of the Labyrinth, in Greek myth. In the Bible, Nimrod is considered the creator of the Tower of Babel, and King Solomon built Solomon's Temple with the assistance of the architect Hiram. In Hinduism, the palaces of the gods were built by the architect and artisan Vishvakarma. Moreover, Indian epic Mahabharata cites amazing work by architect 'Maya.'

Architects also occur in modern fiction. Examples include Howard Roark, protagonist in Ayn Rand's The Fountainhead; Bloody Stupid Johnson, a parody of Capability Brown who appears in Terry Pratchett's Discworld novels; and Slartibartfast, designer of planets in Douglas Adams's The Hitchhiker's Guide to the Galaxy. Basil Al Bayati's novel The Age of Metaphors on the theme of Metaphoric Architecture is also replete with fictional architects. The main characters of Sa'ad, Shiymaa and Sa'im are all architects, as are a number of others who appear throughout the book.

Many films have included central characters who are architects, including Henry Fonda's character "Juror 8" (Davis) in 12 Angry Men (1957), Charles Bronson's character in Death Wish (1974), John Cassavetes' character in Tempest (1982), Wesley Snipes' character in "Jungle Fever" (1991), Christopher Lloyd's character in Suburban Commando (1991), Tom Hanks' character in Sleepless in Seattle (1993), David Strathairn's character in The River Wild (1994), Michael J. Fox's character in The Frighteners (1996), Michael Keaton's character in White Noise (2005) and Jeremy Irons' character in High-Rise (2015).

In television, Mike Brady, father of The Brady Bunch, is an architect; as is Wilbur Post, owner of Mister Ed; Ted Mosby, from How I Met Your Mother, Marshall Darling from Clarissa Explains It All; and David Vincent from The Invaders. Adam Cartwright of Bonanza was an architectural engineer with a university education who designed the sprawling familial ranch-house on the Ponderosa Ranch. The character George Costanza pretends to be an architect named "Art Vandelay" in Seinfeld. Architect Halvard Solness is the protagonist of Henrick Ibsen's 1892 play The Master Builder.

== Lists of architects by country ==
- List of American architects
- List of Armenian architects
- List of Australian architects
- List of Austrian artists and architects
- List of Bahamian architects
- List of Bangladeshi architects
- List of Belgian architects
- List of Brazilian architects
- List of British architects
- List of Bulgarian architects
- List of Canadian architects
- List of Chinese architects
- List of Croatian architects
- List of Cuban architects
- List of Czech architects
- List of Danish architects
- List of Dutch architects
- List of Egyptian architects
- List of Estonian architects
- List of Finnish architects
- List of French architects
- List of German architects
- List of Hungarian architects
- List of Indian architects
- List of Indonesian architects
- List of Iranian architects
- List of Italian architects
- List of Japanese architects
- List of Korean architects
- List of Latvian architects
- List of Lebanese architects
- List of Lithuanian architects
- List of Malaysian architects
- List of Mexican architects
- List of New Zealand architects
- List of Nigerian architects
- List of Norwegian architects
- List of Pakistani architects
- List of Polish architects
- List of Portuguese architects
- List of Romanian architects
- List of Russian architects
- List of Serbian architects
- List of Slovak architects
- List of Slovenian architects
- List of Spanish architects
- List of Sri Lankan architects
- List of Swedish architects
- List of Swiss architects
- List of Taiwanese architects
- List of Turkish architects
- List of Uruguayan architects

== See also ==
- List of architects of supertall buildings
- List of architectural historians
- List of architecture firms
- List of women architects
