= List of Brazilian architects =

Following is a list of Brazilian architects.

- Affonso Eduardo Reidy (1909–1964)
- Alexandre Chan (born 1942)
- Ana Luiza Nobre (born 1964)
- Arthur Casas
- Assis Reis (1926–2011)
- Franz Heep (1902–1978)
- Igor de Vetyemy (born 1981)
- Joaquim Guedes (1932–2008)
- Lina Bo Bardi (1914–1992)
- Lota de Macedo Soares (1910–1967)
- Lúcio Costa (1902–1998)
- Marcio Kogan (born 1952)
- Oscar Niemeyer (1907–2012)
- Paulo Mendes da Rocha (1928–2021)

== See also ==
- List of architects
- List of Brazilians
