= Skalica Culture House =

Secession building in Holíč

Coordinates: 48°50′46.7″N 17°13′46.4″E

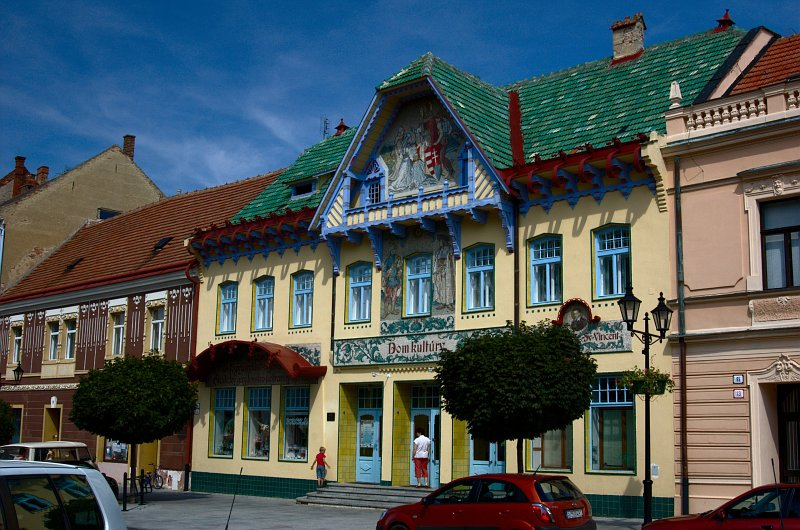
Skalica Culture House

The Skalica Culture House (Slovak: Skalický kultúrny dom) is a Secession building in Skalica, Slovakia, built in 1905 by Slovak architect Dušan Jurkovič.

== History ==
Idea of Skalica Culture House was presented by Slovak politician Pavel Blaho. Architect was Dušan Jurkovič who gain inspiration from Slovak and Moravian folk architecture. Building was open to the public in 1905.
