= Andrijić =

Andrijić, sometimes spelled Andrijic, is a surname and patronym.

== Surname ==
Notable people with the surname include:

- Jay Andrijic (born 1995), Australian tennis player

== Patronym ==
Notable people with the surname include:

- Radoslav Andrijić (fl. 1254), Lord of Hum
- Marko Andrijić (died after 1507), Ragusan stonemason
- Petar Andrijić (died after 1553), Ragusan stonemason
