= Jörg Stollmann =

German architect

Jörg Stollman (born 1968 in Düsseldorf) is a German architect, currently the chair for Urban Design & Architecture at TU Berlin's Institut für Architektur. He is the cofounder of UrbanInform.net.

== Work ==
His most recent work is the restoration of Santozeum, the original site for which was designed by the renowned Greek architect Constantinos Decavallas.
