= List of Romanian architects =

Following is a list of notable architects from Romania.

== A to M ==
- Petre Antonescu (1873–1965)
- Gheorghe Asachi (1788–1869)
- Doina Marilena Ciocănea (born 1951)
- Maria Cotescu (1896–1980)
- Horia Creangă (1892–1943).
- Radu Dudescu (1894–1983)
- Haralamb H. Georgescu (1908–1977)
- Marcel Iancu (1895–1984)
- Károly Kós (1883–1977)
- Cezar Lăzărescu (1923–1986)
- Dimitrie Maimarolu (1859–1926)
- Duiliu Marcu (1885–1966)
- Ion Mincu (1852–1912)
- Paraschiva Iubu (1920–2011)

== N to Z ==
- Alexandru Orăscu (1817–1894)
- Edmond van Saanen Algi (1882–1938)
- Toma T. Socolescu (1883–1960)
- Rosalia Spirer (1900–1990)

== See also ==
- Architecture of Romania
- List of architects
- List of Romanians
