= List of Taiwanese architects =

The following is a list of Taiwanese architects sorted in alphabetical order by surname:

== C ==
- Chen Chi-kwan
- Chen Yin-ho
- Cheng Tzu-tsai

== H ==
- Han Pao-teh
- Hsia Chu-joe
- Hsieh Ying-chun
- Rossana Hu
- Arthur Huang
- Huang Baoyu

== K ==
- Kwan Sung-sing

== L ==
- Lan Mu
- Chen Kuen Lee
- Chu-yuan Lee

== P ==
- Charles Phu

== R ==
- Roan Ching-yueh

== W ==
- C. P. Wang
- Wang Chiu-Hwa
- Wang Da-hong
- Wu Ching-kuo

== X ==
- Xiu Zelan

== Y ==
- Yang Cho-cheng
- Kris Yao

== See also ==
- Architecture of Taiwan
- List of architects
- List of landscape architects
- List of Taiwanese people
