= List of Indonesian architects =

This list of Indonesian architects includes notable architects and civil engineers associated with Indonesia.

== Ancient period ==
- Dang Hyang Nirartha
- Gunadharma

== Early modern period ==
- Albert Aalbers
- A.W. Gmelig Weyning
- Cosman Citroen
- Frans Ghijsels
- G.J.P.M. Bolsius
- Han Groenewegen
- H. von Essen
- Henri Maclaine Pont
- J. Gerber
- J.F.L. Blankenberg
- K. Bos
- Liem Bwan Tjie
- M.J. Hulswit
- Pieter Moojen
- Soejoedi Wirjoatmodjo
- Sukarno
- Thomas Karsten
- Wolff Schoemaker

== Contemporary to present ==
- Han Awal
- Yori Antar
- Andra Matin
- Adi Purnomo
- Daliana Suryawinata & Florian Heinzelmann
- Danny Wicaksono
- Sonny Sutanto
- Budi Pradono
- Ahmad & Wendy Djuhara
- Achmad Noerzaman
- Ardi Jahya
- Tiyok Prasetyoadi
- Gatot Surarjo
- Eko Prawoto
- Irianto PH
- Yanto Effendi
- Sardjono Sani
- Sukendro Prioso & Jeffry Sandy
- Denny Gondo
- Supie Yolodi & Maria Rosantina
- Hendy & Patrick Lim
- Zenin Adrian
- Ridwan Kamil
- Achmad D Tardiyana
- Oki Kuspriyanto
- Muhammad Thamrin
- Willis Kusuma
- Andy Rahman
- Endy Subijono
- Baskoro Tedjo
- Bambang Eryudhawan
- Gunawan Tjahjono
- Yu Sing
- Y. B. Mangunwijaya
- Friedrich Silaban
- Raynaldo Timothy Irwantoro

== See also ==
- Architecture of Indonesia
- List of architects
