= Charles A. Cofield =

American architect

Charles A. Cofield is an African-American architect and advocate for the disabled in his work in Massachusetts and Los Angeles.

== Education and career ==
Cofield completed his undergraduate degree at Howard University where he injured himself as a result of an accident, resulting in paralysis in his arms and legs. He was the first quadriplegic graduate from the MIT School of Architecture where he received his Bachelor of Science in Architecture in 1972, Master of Architecture in 1973 and Master in City Planning in 1974. During his studies, Cofield was employed by the Urban Massachusetts Transit Authority and the Department of Housing Urban Development. He also received the MIT Graham-Rotch Foundation Fellowship in 1971, the MIT Lawrence B. Anderson Fellowship in 1972, and traveled to Europe to study disabled housing communities.

After MIT, he obtained his PhD from UCLA's Urban Planning Program as the first quadriplegic attendee. During Cofield's time at MIT and UCLA, he was able to help introduce disabled access in the schools. Cofield was the first licensed quadriplegic architect in the State of California and the first quadriplegic director of the Los Angeles Housing Authority, which he oversaw for 24 years.
