= Igor de Vetyemy =

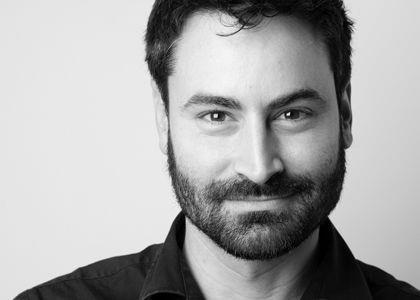
- Born: Igor Freire de Vetyemy; February 28, 1981 (age 45); Rio de Janeiro, Brazil
- Education: Delft University of Technology (2012), Federal University of Rio de Janeiro (2005), University of Oxford (2003)
- Occupation: Architect
- Awards: 2012 Netherlands Architecture Institute Building of the Future
- Projects: City of Sex, Rio de Janeiro Underground canal houses, Amsterdam

Igor de Vetyemy (born February 28, in Rio de Janeiro, 1981), is a Brazilian architect, urban planner, professor and designer. Considered to be one of the exponents of avant-garde Brazilian architecture, he represented the country, together with Paulo Mendes da Rocha and others, in 2008 London Festival of Architecture. In his book "Exhibit Design: The Future", the North American Critic Georges Jacob describes de Vetyemy as "an oxford educated proponent of bio-climate architecture, who believes in surprising the senses." With a focus in Sustainable architecture and another in formal space research, the architect's projects always intend to surprise human senses, emphasizing the sensitive character of architecture. Between 2000 and 2012, de Vetyemy studied in Rio de Janeiro, Oxford and Delft. In 2006, he became an Architecture Professor at Estácio de Sá University and, in 2008, at the Federal University of Rio de Janeiro. Having studied with Master Oscar Niemeyer himself in the beginning of the 2000s, the influence of the "reinforced concrete poet" is clear in the first years of his career. Manuel Sanches, a Brazilian architect, sociologist and Politic Sciences professor at the Federal University of Rio de Janeiro, considers Igor de Vetyemy's work "a demonstration that Brazilian contemporary architecture is worthy of the prestige it has since Niemeyer designed Pampulha(...) Surprising, innovative in the use of materials, in the proposal of constructive methods and, above all, in aesthetics.". But despite the strong influence of Brazilian Masters of tropical modernism, according to the British critic Richard J. Williams, Igor de Vetyemy represents a shift from that architecture in the approach to the vernacular sensuality of Brazilian architecture. In his words, "Niemeyer and his circle pretended that such commodification did not exist, but ended up, by default, endorsing it. Vetyemy recognizes the reality of the situation. Such frankness (...) suggests a less romantic, but more realistic, future.".

== Biography ==
Born in Rio de Janeiro, Brazil, on February 28, 1981, Igor de Vetyemy graduated as an architect and Urban planner with distinction at the Federal University of Rio de Janeiro in 2005. In 2001, studied the generation of Brazilian Masters of Tropical Modernism with Master Oscar Niemeyer himself, leading a team of "professors that included some of the biggest Brazilian exponents of diverse areas, as the poet Ferreira Gullar, o sociologist and politic scientist Emir Sader, the physician and philosopher Luiz Alberto de Oliveira and the engineer José Carlos Sussekind. Between 2003 e 2004 specialized in Architectural history in University of Oxford, in Britain. In 2012 defended a Master Thesis on “Mutualistic Architecture in Delft University of Technology, in The Netherlands, once more graduating with distinction.

During and after the period studying in Rio de Janeiro, de Vetyemy worked at one of the biggest architecture offices of Rio de Janeiro, Indio da Costa AUDT, and founded the “Garage Group” together with colleagues, which used to get together in a garage to research and develop architectural ideas. In 2004 the group began to publish articles on contemporary architecture. In the same year, they were rewarded in a contest for the construction of a Social Daycare in the labor's community of their University.

In 2006, after receiving several awards for his project for the controversial “City of Sex” in Copacabana, he was invited to present his project to the Mayor of Rio de Janeiro, who was interested in building the complex, and had his work published in magazines and newspapers from more than 30 countries around the world. The British architect Nigel Coates considered the project as "a key step in updating Rio's tradition of contemporary architecture." Still in 2006, de Vetyemy became professor at Estácio de Sá University and, in 2008, at the Federal University of Rio de Janeiro lecturing about Ephemeral Architecture, Sustainable architecture, Conception of the architectural form.

In 2007, the architect officially founded his own office, "Igor de Vetyemy arquitetura e design" and in the following year was already invited by the Brazilian Embassy in London to join the “London Festival of Architecture” where his work was presented for the first time to the European public as an example of the avant-garde Brazilian architecture.

In 2010, de Vetyemy moved to The Netherlands, where he got married with the Dutch fashion designer Arno Smedinga. In 2012, the architect was rewarded by the Netherlands Architecture Institute for his project Downtown Amsterdam, underground canal houses. Since 2011, Igor de Vetyemy collaborates with Mecanoo architecten, a Delft-based office.

== Major works ==
- 2004: Social Daycare in the labor's community at Ilha do Fundão, Rio de Janeiro, RJ Brazil
- 2005: City of Sex, Rio de Janeiro, RJ, Brazil
- 2005: Elizabeth Savalla residence, Rio de Janeiro, Brazil
- 2006: Botucatu Acoustic Shell, São Paulo, Brazil
- 2006: Várzea Paulista Municipal Theatre, São Paulo, Brazil
- 2007: MAB Fundição store, Rio de Janeiro, Brazil
- 2008: Juliana Paes residence, Rio de Janeiro, Brazil
- 2008: Eco house, Rio de Janeiro, Brazil
- 2009: CREA Headquarters (Brazilian certification board for engineers, architects and contractors), Curitiba, Brasil
- 2010: Corrfa building renovation, Rio de Janeiro, Brazil
- 2010: Alcion Copacabana building renovation, Rio de Janeiro, Brazil
- 2010: Água Branca farm, Nova Friburgo, Brazil
- 2011: Sustainable Headquarters for IAB (Brazilian Architects Institute), Palmas, Brazil
- 2011: Arno Smedinga residence, Rotterdam, The Netherlands
- 2012: Underground canal houses, Amsterdam, the Netherlands

== Lectures and exhibitions ==
- 2012: from October to November in BK City, T.U.Delft

Archiprix exhibition with the best Master projects of 2011/2012

- 2008: from June to July in Gallery 32, London, England

Group exhibition “RAW: New Brazilian architecture”, part of the “London Festival of Architecture”, as a representative, together with Paulo Mendes da Rocha and others, of Brazilian avant-garde architecture.

- 2008: November in Fluminense Federal University (UFF), Niterói, Brazil

Lecture on “Contemporary Architecture and the Brazilian market”

- 2008: August in Estácio de Sá University, RJ, Brazil

Lecture on “Urban Voids”

- 2007: from February to June: Touring Exhibition Opera Prima 2006

With the 18th edition winning works: Universities in Campinas, Porto Alegre, Florianópolis, Salvador, Recife and Fortaleza, Brazil

- 2006: August in Estácio de Sá University, RJ, Brazil

Lecture on project “City of Sex”, in Rio de Janeiro

- 2006: August in Porão das Artes, Bienal Building in São Paulo

Group exhibition Opera Prima with the 18th edition winning works

== Prizes ==
- 2012: “Building of the future” competition by the Netherlands Architecture Institute

First prize with the project “Downtown Amsterdam - Underground canal houses”

- 2012: Archiprix

Indicated by Delft University of Technology with the thesis “Mutualistic architecture: Innovative approach towards a preservative densification”

- 2006: "Arquiteto do Amanhã" ("Tomorrow's Architect Award")

finalist with the project “City of Sex”

- 2006: Opera Prima

Honorable mention with the project “City of Sex”

- 2006: “Projetando com PVC” (Plastic Design award)

Honorable mention with the project “City of Sex”

- 2004: Design competition for a social Nursery in the campus of the Federal University of Rio de Janeiro

Honorable mention

== Bibliography ==
- JACOB, Georges. Exhibit Design: the future. Lexington: Create Space, 2011
- WILLIAMS, Richard J. Brazil: Modern architectures in history. Reaktion books, 2009
