= Jack Travis =

American architect

Jack Travis (born March 2, 1952) is an American interior designer, architect, author and educator based in South Bronx, New York City. He designed Spike Lee's home and was the architectural consultant for Lee's film Jungle Fever. He has mentored students at the Charter High School for Architecture. Travis wrote African American Architects in Current Practice (1991)
