= Eric Ho =

American architect

Eric Ho is an American trained architect, urban strategist and educator based in Hong Kong. He is the co‑founder and director of Architecture Commons, a design agency for urban innovation, and founder of the Neighbourhood Innovation Lab. Ho has worked on participatory urban projects in New York and Hong Kong and is noted for his role as lead consultant for Hong Kong’s Well-being Design Guide for public housing estates.

Ho studied architecture at the University of Pennsylvania and at the Harvard University Graduate School of Design, where he received a faculty design award. He later became a registered architect in the U.S. state of New York and a LEED Accredited Professional.

Ho is most noted for his "miLES" (Made in the Lower East Side) project, which raised over US$32,000 in crowdsourcing funds. whose Kickstarter campaign raised over US$32,000. The project was created to convert underused or vacant New York City storefronts into short‑term spaces for cultural, community and entrepreneurial uses. A later profile in The New York Times described Ho as “the pop‑up activist of the Lower East Side” and highlighted his role in activating vacant storefronts through miLES. According to an earlier article from The New York Times’ Local East Village blog, Ho hoped that theatre companies and other community groups could take advantage of the spaces.

Ho later co‑founded Architecture Commons, described as a design agency working on urban innovation, housing and neighbourhood‑scale projects in Hong Kong and beyond. As part of this work he launched the Neighbourhood Innovation Lab, which develops human‑centred approaches to city design and has received recognition such as Good Design Awards in 2022 and 2025.

Ho spearheaded the consultant team that developed the Well‑being Design Guide for public housing estates in Hong Kong under the Hong Kong Housing Bureau and Hong Kong Housing Authority. The guide was created through an extensive process of expert consultation and resident engagement and organises well‑being in public housing around eight concepts, including health and vitality, green living and sustainability, age‑friendliness and intergenerational living. It provides around 50 strategies and more than 170 design ideas intended to inform both new developments and improvement works to existing estates. The project has been reported as influencing policy for public housing estate environments, facilities and public spaces and has received professional awards, including recognition from the Hong Kong Institute of Urban Design and the Hong Kong Institute of Planners.

In addition to practice, Ho teaches urban design at the Chinese University of Hong Kong’s School of Architecture and has taught design thinking and strategy at Parsons School of Design. He is a member of the American Institute of Architects and has served in leadership roles in the AIA Hong Kong chapter, including as president for 2025.
