= Oscar Nitzchke =

American architect

Oscar Nitzchke (August 29, 1900 – February 11, 1991) was an architect, best known for designing the United Nations headquarters in New York and the Los Angeles Opera House.

Nitzchke was born in Altona, Germany, and grew up in Switzerland. In 1920 he moved to Paris to enter the École nationale supérieure des Beaux-Arts, but left the school in 1922 to work with Le Corbusier. He came to New York in 1938 to work with the architectural firm Harrison & Abramovitz, and later moved on to Jim Nash Associates, where he was made head of design. He retired in the early 1970s. In his retirement Nitzchke moved back to Paris, and died in the suburb Ivry-sur-Seine.

== Sources ==
- Agrest, Diana; R. Stephen Sennott (2003). Encyclopedia of 20th-Century Architecture. Taylor & Francis. pp. 935–6. ISBN 1-57958-433-0.
