= Charles-François Mandar =

French architect and engineer

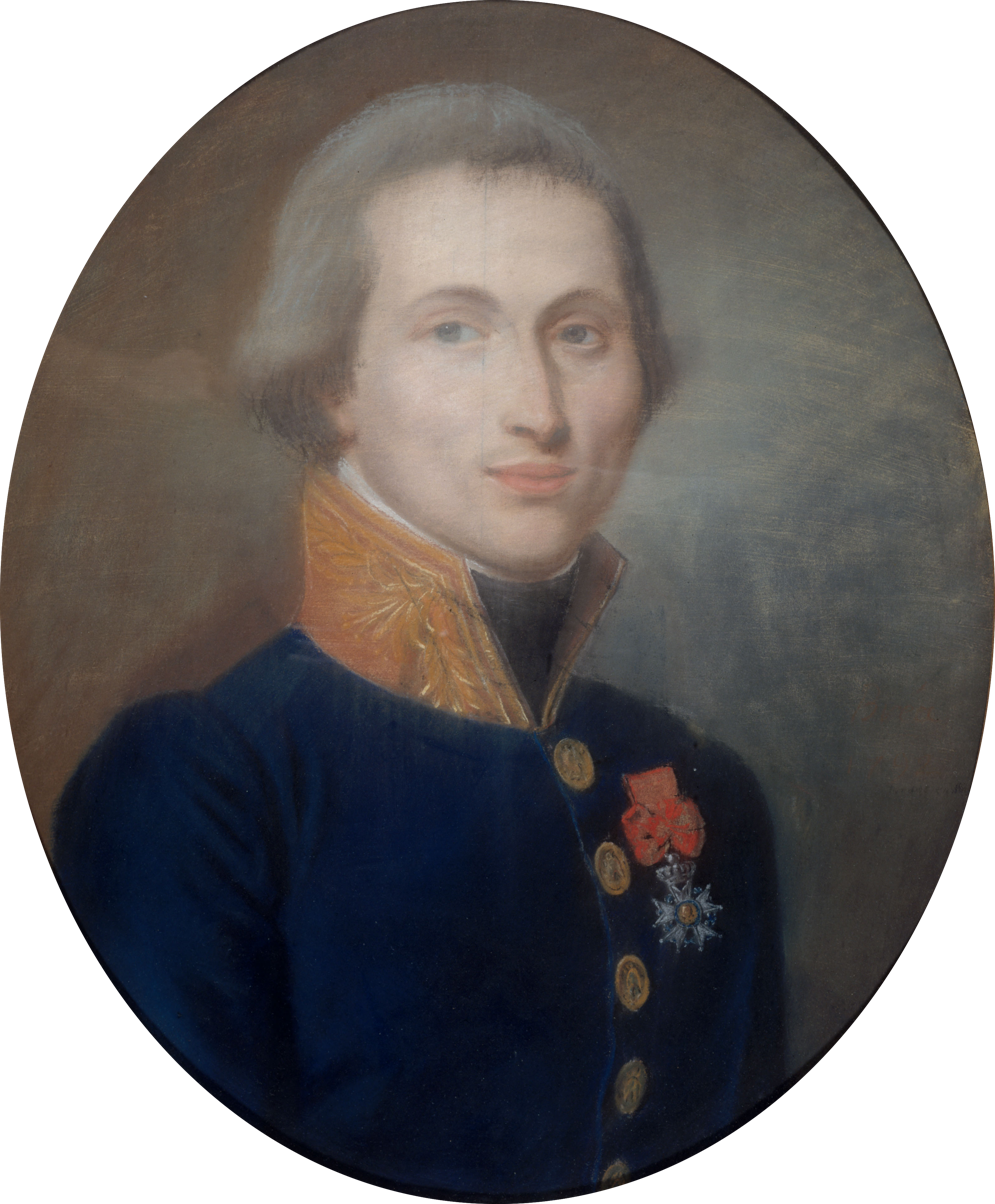

Charles-François Mandar (11 November 1757 in Marines – 8 September 1844 in Paris) was a French architect and engineer, best remembered for building a Chinese pavilion at the Château de Madon in 1790. He was made a Knight of the Legion of Honour in 1814.
