= Geoffrey Wooding =

American architect

- Born: Geoffrey Marshall Wooding; February 20, 1954
- Died: January 26, 2010 (aged 55)
- Occupation: Architect
- Buildings: Koch Biology Building, MIT; South Campus Residence Hall and Dining Commons, UChicago; Whittemore Hall, Dartmouth College

Geoffrey Wooding (February 20, 1954 – January 26, 2010) was a Boston architect who mainly designed mixed-income housing and college dormitories. He was also one of the authors of Building Type Basics for Housing a book documenting good housing design and conventions. Wooding was part of the American Institute of Architects, LEED certified, and a principal of Goody, Clancy & Associates, Inc of Boston.
