= Adolfo Moran =

Spanish architect (1953–2024)

Adolfo Morán
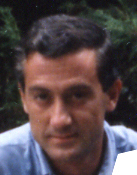
- Moran in 2014
- Born: 1953; Valladolid, Spain
- Died: 14 November 2024 (aged 70–71); Pozuelo de Alarcón, Spain
- Education: University of Navarra
- Occupations: Architect, city planner, theoretical physicist

Adolfo Morán Ortega (1953 – 14 November 2024) was a Spanish architect, city planner and theoretical physicist, who co-founded of World Physics Society.

Moran was professor of architecture at University of Valladolid, in which he was Projects I chairman and at the Faculty of Fine Arts of the University of Salamanca, full titular professor of Architectural Ideation Department, full professor of Architectural Imagination and City Imagination, and director of Permanent Seminar of Housing Studies at Technical University of Madrid.

In 1992 his architectural work was selected as the principal one by the Spanish Architecture Biennial. With Joaquin Moran, he received the award Gran Vía Posible. Madrid 2010.

== Books and scientific publications ==
- The Reasonable Architecture or The Music of Space (La Arquitectura Razonable o La Música del Espacio) Adolfo Moran (1989 GAC edit.)
- The Project of The City to Live (El Proyecto de la Ciudad para Vivir )Adolfo Moran (1992 Madrid City Hall edit.)
- About the Method of Analysis and Architectural Production (Sobre el Método de Análisis y Producción Arquitectónica) Adolfo Moran (1991. Génova. Unione Italiana per el Disegno edit.)
- The Modification of the Architecture (La Modificación de la Arquitectura) Adolfo Moran (1994. Madrid. EGA edit.)
- Architecture and Nature (Arquitectura y Naturaleza) Adolfo Moran (1992. Valladolid. GRAPHEUS edit.)
- The Light in the Project of Architecture according to Vitruvio, Alberti, Palladio and Boullée (La Luz en el Proyecto de Arquitectura según Vitrubio, Alberti, Palladio y Boullée) Adolfo Moran (1992. Roma. Gangemmi Editori edit.)
- Principles of Architecture I (Principios de Arquitectura I) Adolfo Moran (1996. Pamplona. T6 Ediciones edit.)
- Chronicle from Marinetti's Hangar (Crónica desde el Hangar de Marinetti) Adolfo Moran (1992. Buenos Aires. Marca de Agua edit.)
- About Andrea Palladio's Method for the Construction of the Entasis (Sobre el Método de Andrea Palladio para la Realización del Entasis) Adolfo Moran (1992. Pamplona. Publicaciones Universidad de Navarra edit.)
- Towards a New Architecture. The American Challenge (Hacia una Nueva Arquitectura. El Desafío Americano. Adolfo Moran) (1992. Madrid. Taller de Editores edit.)
- The Utopian City (La Ciudad Utópica) (1993. Buenos Aires. Marca de Agua edit.)
- The Blurry Architectural Imagination (La Desdibujada Imaginación Arquitectónica) Adolfo Moran (2009. Madrid. C.EGA edit.)

== Representative buildings and projects ==
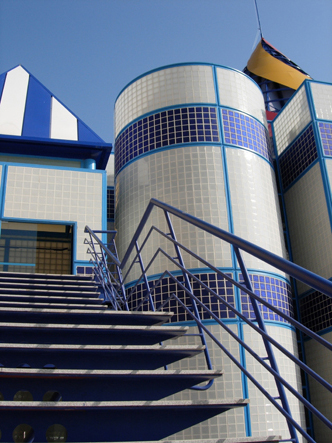
Police Building Madrid

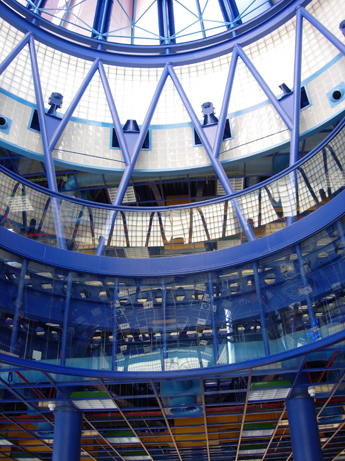

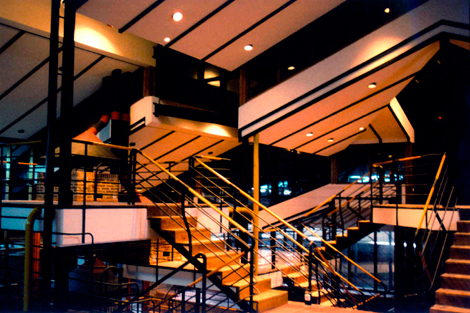
Social Club Simancas

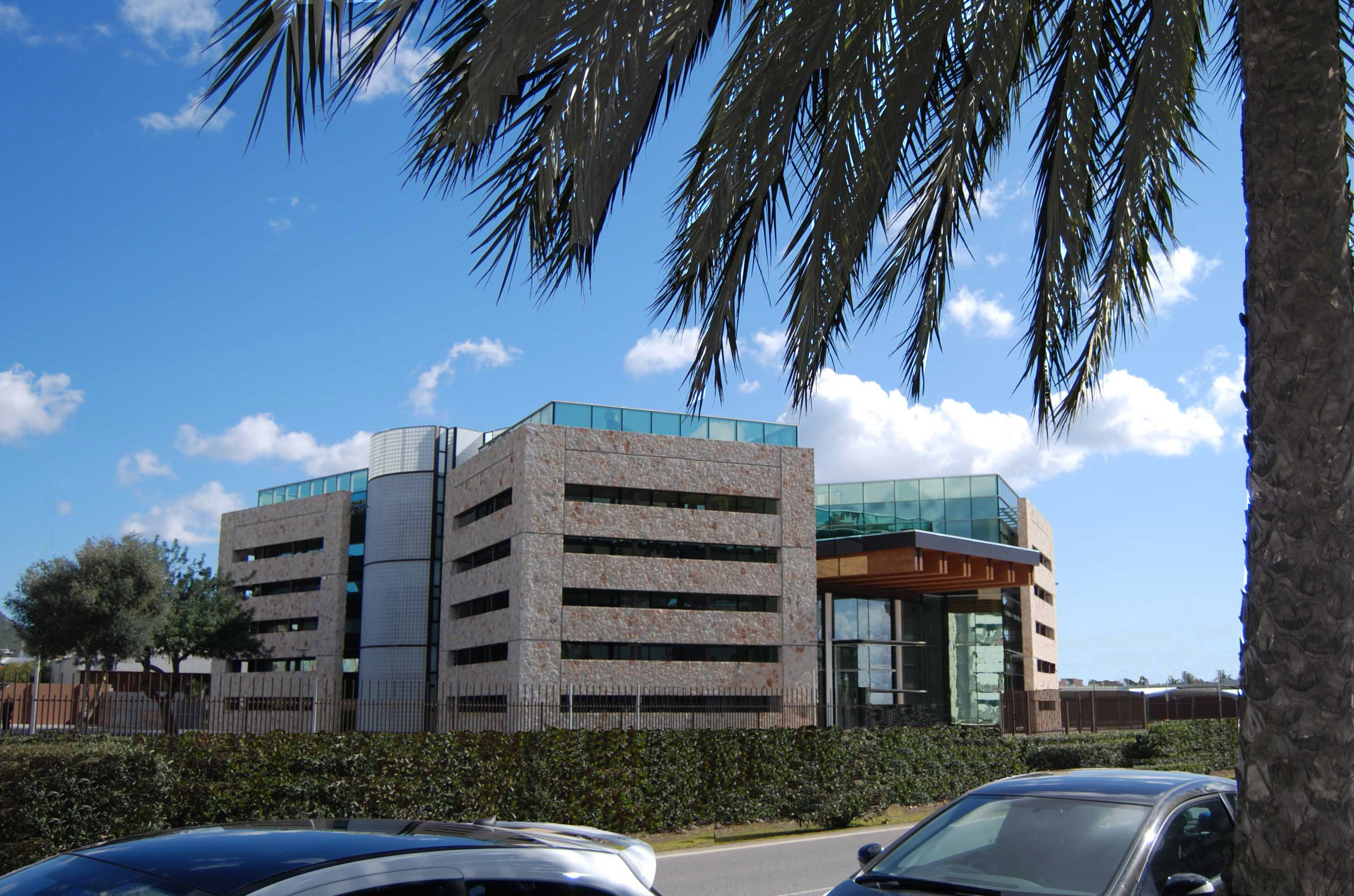
Ibiza Building Ibiza

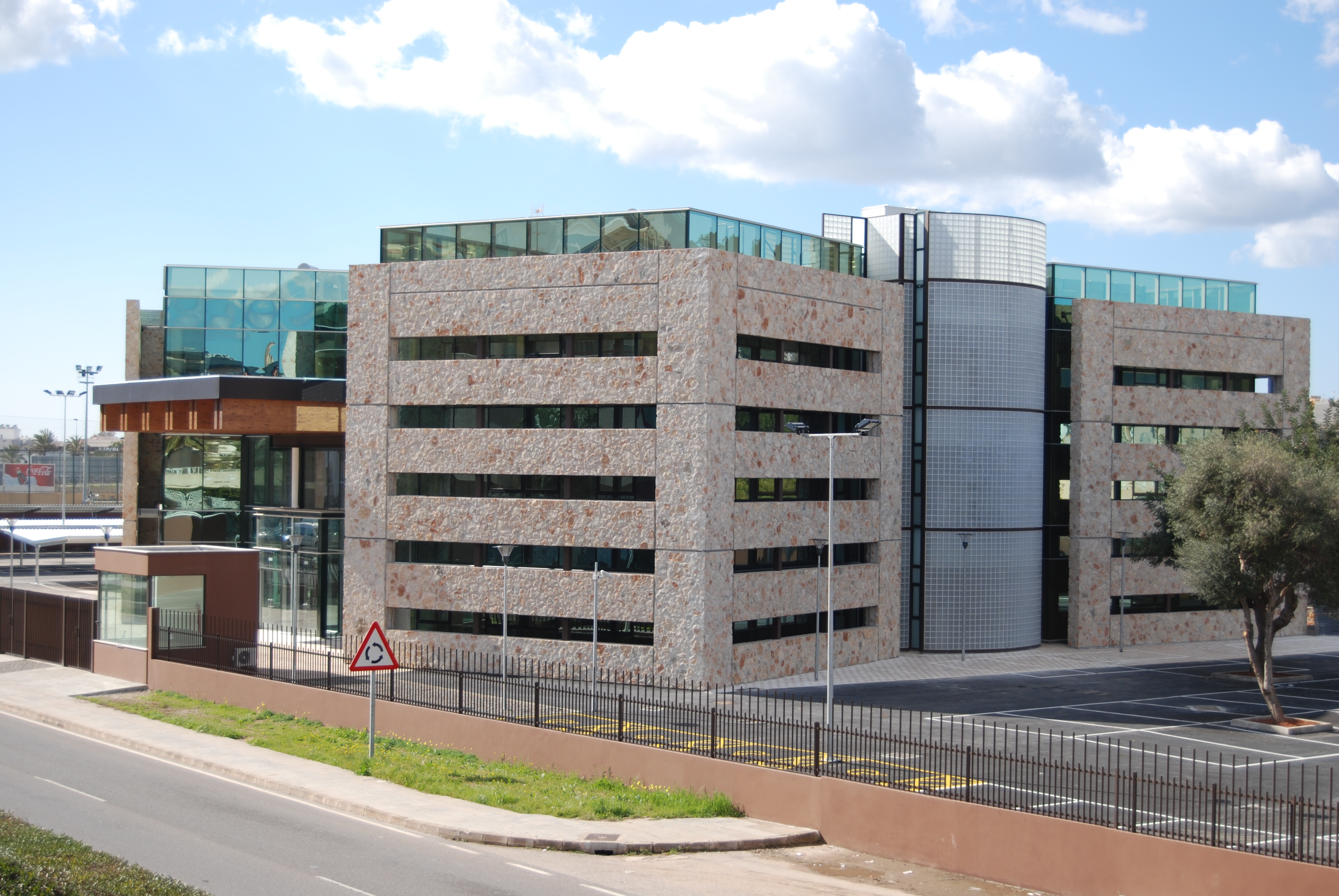
Ibiza Building Ibiza
- Arch in Manhattan. New York City . U.S. ]
- Palace of the President of Castile and Lion, Spain
- Chamberí Neighborhood Remodeling. Madrid. Spain
- Lake Town Pueblo del Lago Punta del Este. Uruguay
- Gare Routiere Town. Fes, Morocco
- Foreign Brigade. Madrid, Spain
- Control Buildings of Castile and Lion Headquarters, Spain
- Social Club and Housings in Simancas, Spain
- Transformation of the Esgueva River along Valladolid, Spain

== Recognitions ==
- The work of Adolfo Moran was rewarded by II Spanish Architecture Bienal(1993), as one of main Spanish architecture works
- First prize Award Gran Vía Posible. Madrid 2010
- First prize Eivissa Building. Eivissa. Balearic Islands 2006
- First prize Commissioner Universal Exposition EXPO08. Zaragoza 2006
