= F. A. Minuth =

American architect

- Known for: Architect

F. A. Minuth, AIA, was an American architect practicing in New York City in the late nineteenth and early twentieth century. His work was exclusively residences and lofts. His office was located at 289 Fourth Avenue until 1905, and at 425 Fifth Avenue from 1908.

== Works ==
- 1901: 160 E 1st Ave and 19th Street, a five-storey brick residence for the Evangelical Lutheran Church of Christ for $10,000
- 1901: 80 East Sixth Avenue and 15th Street, a six-storey brick and stone lofts and stores for $70,000 (builder N Campbell & Sons of 146 West 23rd Street)
- 1901: 60 and 62 West 15th Street, a six-storey brick store and loft building, for Charles Wittenauer of 36 West 15th Street for $70,000
- 1903: Fifth Ave and the NE corner of 11th Street, a 10-storey and mezzanine brick and stone apartment hotel for William E Finn of 115 Broadway of $375,000
- 1903: 100 West Second Ave and 84th Street, a 6.5-storey brick and stone clubhouse for Workingmens Educational and Home Association of 206 E 86th Street for $200,000.00
- 1903: 415 W Fifth Ave and 35th Street, an 11-storey brick and stone store and loft building for Dr Henry P Loomis of 58 E 34th Street for $350,000
- 1904: 400 W Fifth Avenue and 34th Street, an 11-storey brick and stone store and loft buildings for Dr H P Loomis Mrs Adeline E L Prince of 58 E 34th Street and 15 Lexington Ave for $400,000
- 1905: 13 West 34th Street, a 5-storey brick and stone store and loft building for Robert Smith of 32 West 92nd Street for $70,000
- 1908: 37-39 West 8th Street, a nine-sty brick and stone store and loft building for A De Jonge of 1144 Jackson Ave. for $130,000
- 1908: NE corner of 21st Street and Eleventh Ave, a three-storey brick and stone stores and factory for Moore Estate of 191 Ninth Avenue for $60,000
- 1909: 139-145 East Houston Street, a seven-storey brick and stone store and loft building for Louis Minsky and Martin Engel of 236 Eldridge Street for $100,000
