= Rafiq Azam =

Bangladeshi architect

Md. Rafiq Azam
- রফিক আজম
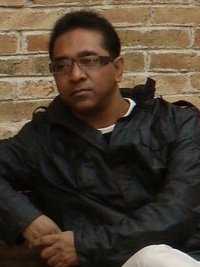
- Azam in 2011
- Born: 29 December 1963 (age 62)
- Education: Bangladesh University of Engineering and Technology
- Occupation: Architect
- Website: rafiqazam.com

Muhammad Rafiq Azam (born 29 December 1963) is a Bangladeshi architect.

== Career ==
Azam graduated from Bangladesh University of Engineering and Technology in 1989.

In 2016, Dhaka South City Corporation launched the "Jol Sobujer Dhaka Project" with a 2 billion Bangladeshi Taka ($24M as of 2016) budget to revitalize 19 parks and 12 playgrounds. As part of the project, Azam and his team at Shatotto Architecture redesigned the 1.3-acre (0.53 ha) Shahid Abdul Alim Playground in Old Dhaka. The boundary wall was removed to make it more welcoming, improve visibility, and to discourage squatters, dumping, and other illegal activities. Trees were planted, and a 500-cubic-metre (18,000 cu ft) underground rainwater reservoir was added to alleviate flooding and help keep the grass green during the dry season. In January 2017, Azam and his team began work on the renovation of 29-acre (12 ha) Osmani Udyan park in Dhaka. The work was scheduled to be completed by June 2018, but after multiple design changes is still ongoing as of February 2021.

== Projects ==
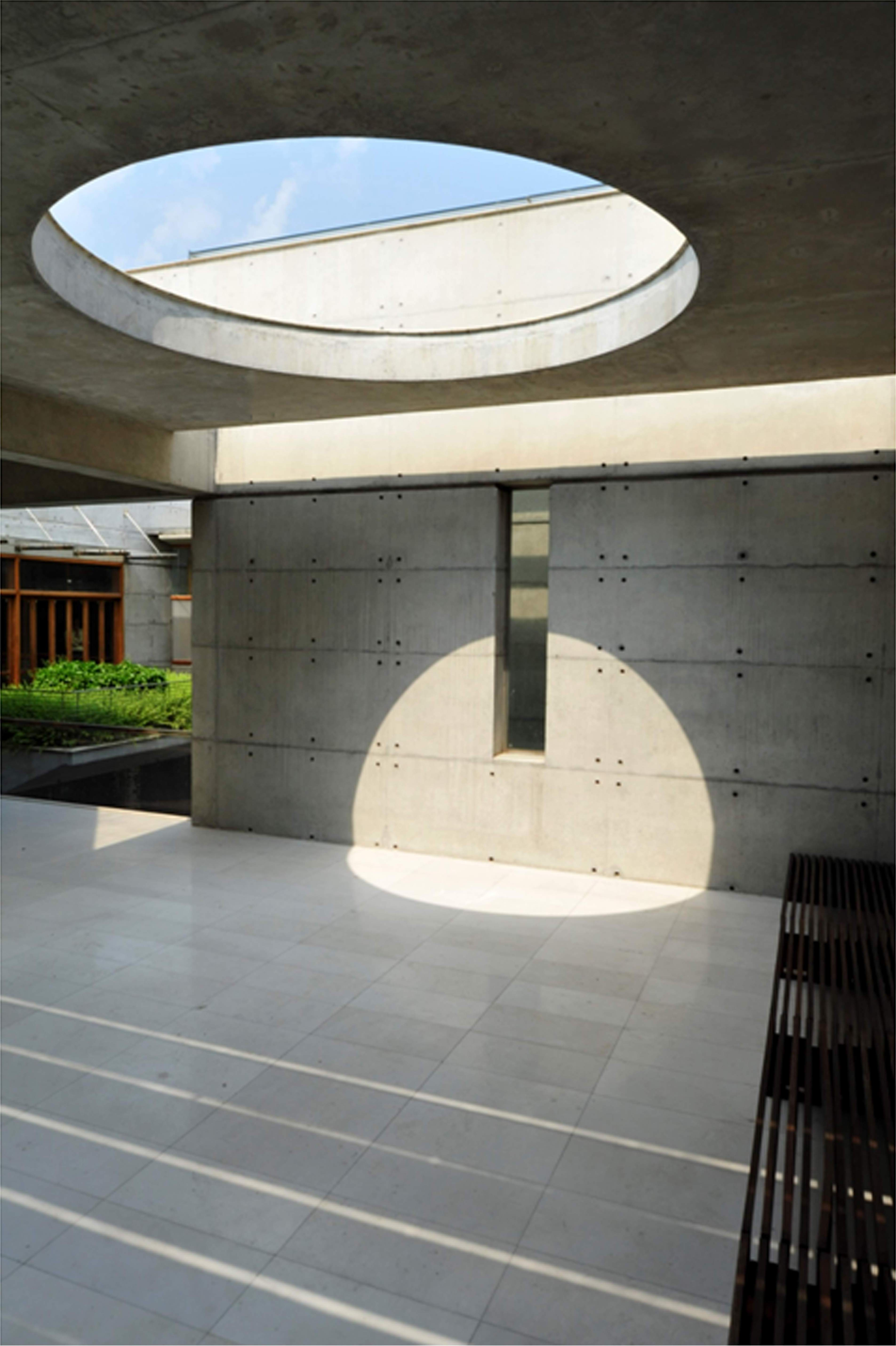
S.A. Residence

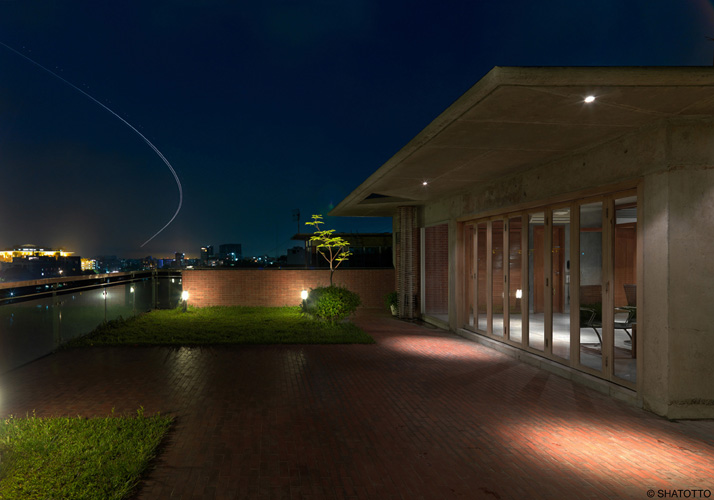
South Water Garden

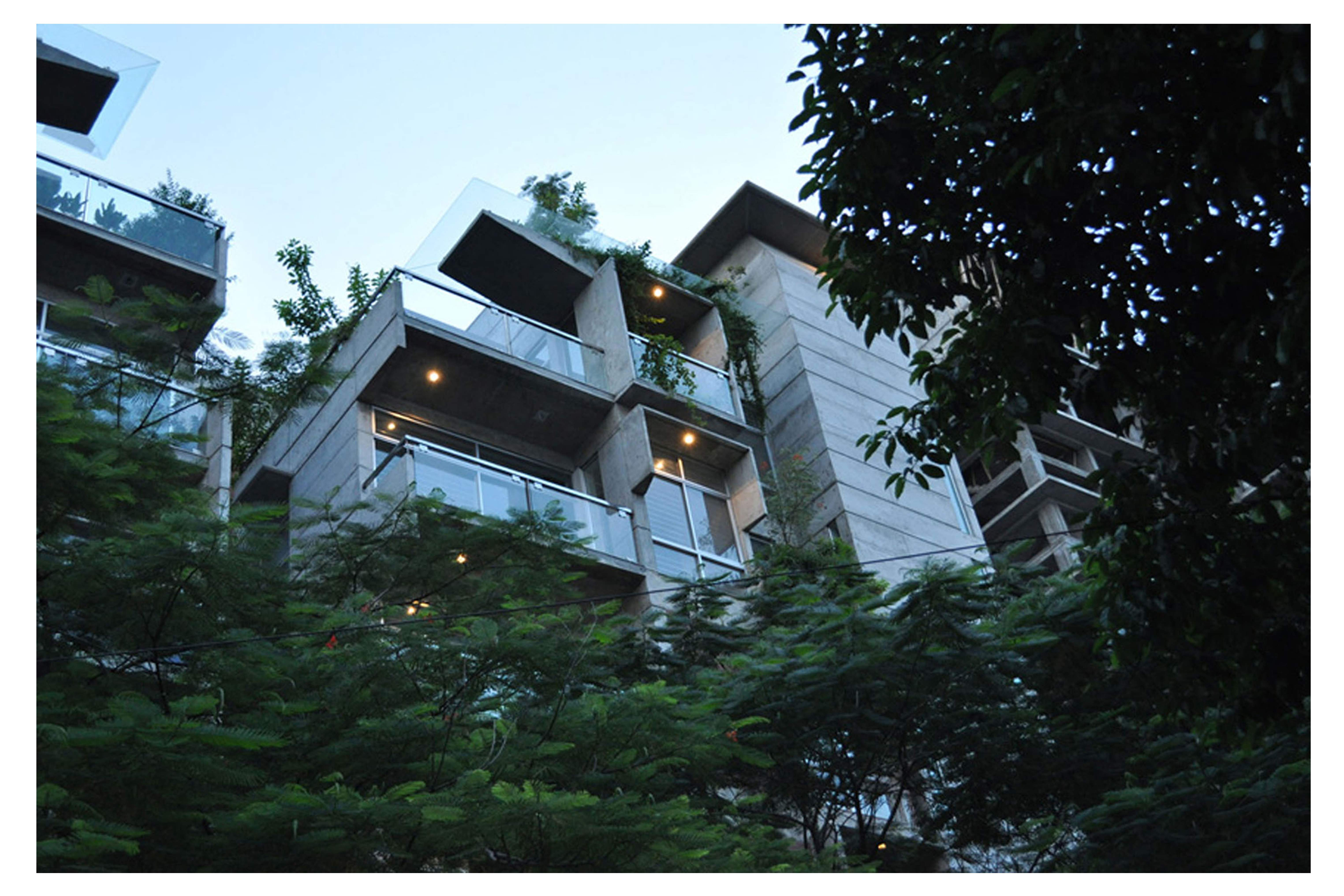
South Water Caress

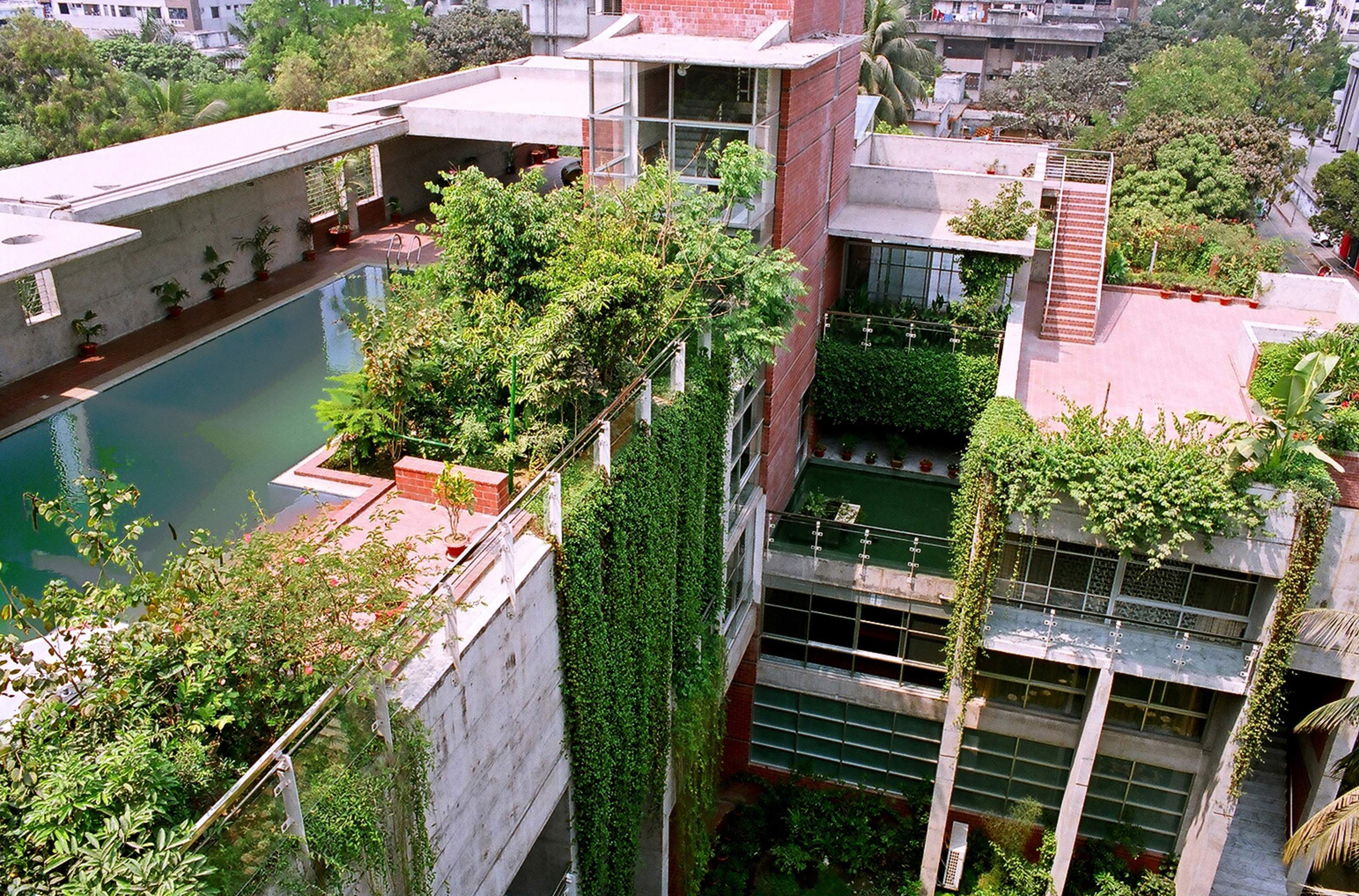
Meghna Residence

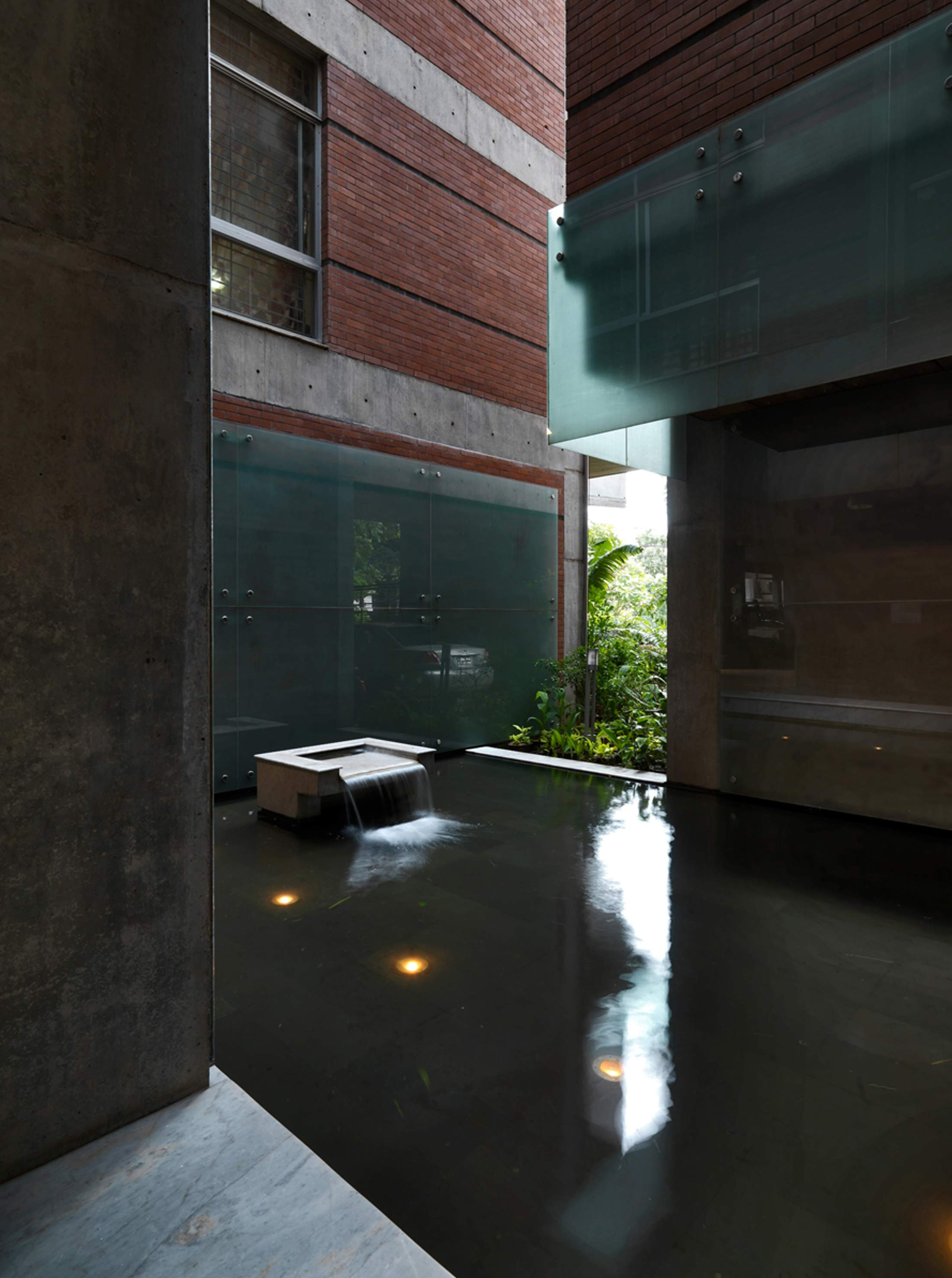
Alif Breeze

== Awards ==
- 1976: Jawharlal Neheru Memorial Gold Medal
- 1977: First prize in the National Children’s Television Award (NOTUN KURI), Bangladesh
- 1991: Winner, Mimar International Design Competition- VII, London
- 1996: IAB Design Award, awarded by the Institute of Architects Bangladesh
- 2004: short-listed for the Aga Khan Award for Architecture
- 2007: AR Emerging Awards
- 2007: Berger Award for Excellence in Architecture for the project 'Meghna Residence'
- 2007: The 2007 Kenneth F. Brown, Asia Pacific Culture & Architecture Design Award. US
- 2007: Short-listed among the 27 finalists for the Aga Khan Award for Architecture
- 2008: Winner, 2nd cycle (Most Thought Provoking Project), World Architecture Community Award
- 2008: Winner, 1st cycle, World Architecture Community Award
- 2009: Leading European Architecture Award (LEAF)
- 2009: Winner, Cityscape Architecture Award 2009
- 2009: Winner, 5th cycle, World Architecture Community Award
- 2012: Winner of Emirates Glass Leading European Architects' Forum (LEAF) Awards Residential Building of the year award (multiple occupancy)
- 2012: Winner of World Architectural Community Award, 11th Cycle (5 times)
- 2012: The South Asian "Architect of the Year" Award, 2011 (6 times)
- 2015: The Edge PAM Green Excellence Award
- 2016: Rise High Bangladesh : "Amazing Bangladeshi 2016"
- 2017: Berger Award for Excellence in Architecture, Winner
- 2017: World Architecture Festival Award (WAF), Winner for "Aga Khan Academy Bangladesh"
- 2017: Cityscape Award for Emerging Markets, Winner for "South Huda's Skyline" in the category, "Residential-Medium to High Rise (Built)"
- 2017: ARCASIA Gold Medal Award for "SA Family Graveyard" in the category "Public Amenity Buildings – Specialized"
- 2018: AD100 Most Influential Names in Architecture
- Eurasian Prize Gold Diploma in Architecture 2020
- Eurasian Prize Silver Diploma in Urban Planning
- DNA Paris Design Awards 2021- Honorable Mention
- Outstanding Property Award London- Platinum Category
- AR Public Award 2022- High Commendations
- UIA 2030 Award 20220- High Commendations
- Commonwealth Associations of Architects Robert Matthew Lifetime Achievement Award 2022
- 12th Idea-Tops Award China-2022 Winner for "Rasulbagh Children's Park"
- 2022: World Architecture Festival Award (WAF), Winner for "Rasulbagh Children's Park"

== Exhibitions ==
- 1985: 7th National Exhibition Bangladesh
- 1986: 3rd Asian Art Biennial, Bangladesh
- 1993: 6th Asian Art Biennial, Bangladesh
- 1994: Tenth National Young Artists Exhibition, Dhaka
- 1995: Solo Painting Exhibition, Nepal
- 1995: 8th ARCASIA Forum Architectural Exhibition, Singapore
- 1998: Solo Exhibition "ArTchitecture" in New York, U.S.
- 1999: Solo Exhibition "ArTchitecture" in Drik Gallery, Dhaka
- 2005: UIA2005, Architectural exhibition in Istanbul
- 2005: Kenneth Brown Worldwide Travel Exhibition
- 2007: AR Emerging Architecture Exhibition at the RIBA, London, Korea and Germany
- 2008: "Nature is" a solo exhibition at Bengal Gallery, Dhaka
- 2008: Architectural Excellence in Bangladesh, RAIA exhibition in Sydney, Australia
- 2009: "Two Men Show" at Gallery Hittite, Yorkville art district Toronto, Canada
- 2014: "Water in Light" at Bengal Art Lounge, Gulshan, Bangladesh
- 2014: Venice Architectural Biennale 2014 (Time Space Existence)
- 2016: Venice Architectural Biennale 2016 (Time Space Existence)
- 2016: Dhaka Art Summit
- 2019: Bengal Stream, Over the World
