= Marko Andrijić =

Stonemason from Ragusa

Marko Andrijić (c. 1470 - after 1507) was a stonemason from the Republic of Ragusa and one of the great master builders of the 15th and 16th-century. His son, Petar Andrijić (c. 1492–1553), was also a stonemason.

Many ornamental carvings in Korčula and elsewhere are attributed to Marko Andrijić. He also introduced some transitional Renaissance features in his work.

== See also ==
- List of architects
