= Antonio Miró Montilla =

Puerto Rican architect

Antonio Miró Montilla (born 1937, San Juan, Puerto Rico) is a Puerto Rican architect and educator.

== Education ==
He studied architecture at the University of Notre Dame, Notre Dame, Indiana, from 1956 until 1961, when he graduated at the top of his class and was awarded the Student Medal of the American Institute of Architects. He is listed by the University of Notre Dame among the Notable Alumni. In 1979, Miró Montilla was awarded the Gold Medal of the Colegio de Arquitectos de Puerto Rico.

== Career ==
Antonio Miró Montilla was the first Puerto Rican architect appointed as a director of an agency of the Commonwealth of Puerto Rico when he was appointed as Executive Director of the Puerto Rico Public Buildings Authority in 1969. In 1971, Miró Montilla was appointed as first Dean of the School of Architecture of the University of Puerto Rico. The School of Architecture was established in 1966 at the Río Piedras Campus as an autonomous school attached to the office of the Chancellor. In 1971, the School was placed at the faculty level headed by a dean. Under Miró Montilla's leadership, the first major revision of the architecture curriculum was made and the professional degree was changed to Master of Architecture. During his time as Dean the School of Architecture was accredited for the first time by the National Architectural Accrediting Board (NAAB).

Miró Montilla served as Dean of Architecture until 1978 when he was appointed Chancellor of the Río Piedras Campus of the University of Puerto Rico. He served as Chancellor for six years and in 1985 returned to teaching at the School of Architecture. At the end of 1997 he retired from the University of Puerto Rico.
