= Sigvald Berg =

American architect

- Born: November 15, 1894; Helena, Montana, U.S.
- Died: December 4, 1985 (aged 91); Helena, Montana, U.S.
- Education: Montana State University
- Occupation: Architect
- Spouse: Helen Haller

Sigvald Berg (November 15, 1894 - December 4, 1985) was an American architect who designed many buildings in the state of Montana, especially Helena. In 1954, he designed the first residence hall for male students on the campus of Montana State University in Bozeman.
