= Denise Civil =

New Zealand architect

- Education: University of Auckland
- Occupation: Architect

Academic background
- Thesis: Aspects of urban form: a descriptive technique and investigation of the form of a New Zealand urban environment (1984)

Denise Civil (née Hackwell) is a New Zealand architect.

== Biography ==
Civil studied architecture in Auckland, and following graduation, worked as a town planner at the Auckland City Council. She returned to her studies in 1981 and completed a PhD in 1984. She then moved to the United States for three years before returning to New Zealand and working at Claire Chambers Architects. She registered as an architect in 1989 and set up her own practice in 1990. Civil's work is primarily residential alterations, new houses and commercial projects.

In 2001, Civil became an assessor of graduates applying for New Zealand registration as architects. From 2009 to 2015, Civil was involved with the Australian and New Zealand Architecture Programme Accreditation Procedure, which monitors and validates architecture degree programmes in New Zealand. In 2023, Civil received a Te Kāhui Whaihanga New Zealand Institute of Architects President's Award for her service to the profession.
