= Shirley Shen =

Chinese–Canadian architect

Shirley Shen is a Chinese–Canadian AIBC certified architect registered in Washington State. She currently works in Vancouver, British Columbia where she is the creative director and co-founder of Haeccity Architecture Studio.

== Early life ==
Shen was born in Richmond, BC. Throughout her life she has lived in Canada, China, Taiwan and the United States. From 1993 to 2000 Shen lived in Hong Kong, where she attended King George V High School (KGV). Shen speaks English, Cantonese and Mandarin.

Shen credits I.M Pei’s Bank of China Tower as the inspiration for wanting to become an architect. At the age of 17 she tried to intern for I. M. Pei, but he didn't have an office in Hong Kong, so she worked for two weeks at Sherman Kung & Associates (another partner who worked on the tower). This short stint as an intern was enough to confirm for Shen that she wanted to practice architecture in the future.

Shen has attributed what felt like a natural move into being an architectural practitioner, in part, to the structured and community-minded framework of her youth.

== Education ==
Shen received her undergraduate degree in architecture (BSc Arch.) from the McGill School of Architecture in 2004.

In 2005 she went on to get her Masters of Architecture from the MIT School of Architecture and Planning. While at MIT Shen co-founded the Office for Unsolicited Architecture which proposes an alternative form of architectural practice "that pro-actively seeks out new territories for intervention, addresses pressing social needs and takes advantage of emerging opportunities for architecture." Shen's Masters thesis at MIT, in Boston, addressed cultural relativity in architecture. She was interested in looking into how architecture could be used as a site for cultural exchange, as well as how it could express cultural context.

She graduated from MIT in 2008.

== Career ==
=== Early years ===
In 2001 Shen started her career working as an intern for Leigh & Orange Architects for three months during her undergraduate degree. After graduating in 2005, she went on to have a brief stint as a summer scholar for Hanbury Evans Wright Vlattas & Company, an architecture and planning firm based out of Virginia, United States. Shen's last short work period was for three months in 2008 when she was an architectural and urban designer for ORG Office for Permanent Modernity in Brooklyn, New York.

Shen started her career working as a Junior Architect at Peter Gluck & Partners from 2008 to 2010 in New York, where she credits gaining "some of the most valuable experience of her career."

After a move back to Vancouver, Shen worked as a designer for Henrique Partners Architects between 2011 and 2014.

Shen was also a member of the Vancouver Heritage Commission for the City of Vancouver for two years beginning in 2020.

Shen has recalled being treated like a model minority when living in the United States. She noted that her training never fully prepared her to be the only young, Chinese-Canadian, female architect in the room, thus leading to inadvertent competition with other Asians or cultural groups in the early days of her career.

=== Founding Haeccity ===
Shen founded Haeccity [Heck-Si-Tee] with her husband and fellow architect, Travis Hanks, in 2011. Haeccity is a Vancouver based full-service design studio that blurs the lines between art, architecture and planning, where Shen currently operates as the Creative Director.

The firm name Haeccity is derived from the word Haecceity meaning the status of being an individual or a particular nature, or the characteristics of a certain thing that set it apart from others.

Haeccity Studio is known for their community engagement and tries to approach each design challenge holistically, focusing on the intersection between architecture, environment, community and culture.

=== Approach to architecture ===
Shen does not have a signature style of architecture, each project she takes on is different. However, throughout her practice use of local materials and a focus on custom details, while working within a medium budget, has created a distinct look. In a 2021 interview Shen said,

"What’s most important to me, at this stage in my career, is making some sort of impact on people’s lives. For single-family projects and renovations, it’s about guiding the client through a complex process that will take longer and cost more than they imagined, and have them come out the other side saying “that was worth the wait and expense, and was even fun at times". For multi-family projects, it's about a benefit to society, whether it's providing housing that's slightly more affordable, more sustainable, or durable. I think as a female, POC owner, I also have to work harder to find ways to make the world more equitable and accessible to the next generation of female POC."

Shen is an advocate for intersectionality. She has said that young architects should not be afraid to advocate for things that are "outside" of architecture – politics, policy, etc. – because it's all interconnected.

== Work in academia ==
In 2021 Shen taught at the University of British Columbia School of Architecture and Landscape Architecture, the leading school for architecture in Canada. She, along with husband and work partner Travis Hanks, offered what is called an option studio for students working on their Master's degree. The studio focused on the topic of "Missing Middle Housing" in Vancouver.

== Recognition ==
In 2018, the Urbanarium, a city improvement platform, held an open design competition to develop and present options for addressing Metro Vancouver's affordability and social health challenges, with outstanding design and social innovation. Shen and Haeccity Studio won both the Grand Prize and Planner's Prize for their Micro-Op Concept.

Haeccity Studio was awarded Runner-up in the Volvo New Garage Challenge in 2021. Their project titled "Mainspring: Our Place to Recharge” was focused on densified neighbourhoods and more sustainable modes of transportation.

Shen’s studio, Haeccity, was selected to be a part of the 2023 Venice Architecture Biennale (La Biennale di Venezia). They were one of ten contributors, from across Canada, for the “Not for Sale!" exhibition by Architects Against Housing Alienation (AAHA).

In 2015 Haeccity was part of the VIVA Vancouver's Robson Redux competition designed to transform the 800 block of Robson Street in Downtown Vancouver, Canada. Haeccity's entry "Robson Reclaimed" received widespread recognition and an honourable mention award.

Notable works include Curio House and Missing Middle Infill Housing in Vancouver, BC.
