= Mihály Párkányi =

Hungarian architect (1924–1991)

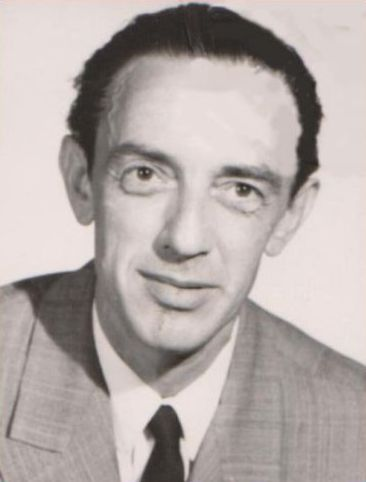
dr. Mihály (Michael) Párkányi

Dr. Mihály (Michael) Párkányi (1 January 1924 in Budapest – 28 January 1991 in Budapest ) was a Hungarian architect.

== Biography ==
Finished Technical University, Budapest, Faculty of Architecture, Graduated 1948. Later on in 1952-1954 finished further two years at the Budapest Lorand Eötvös University of Sciences, as historian.

1948-50 Designer at the Building Research Institute (ÉTI) Type-planning section

1950-51 Secretary of the Scientific Society for Building (Federation of Technical and Scientific Societies.)

1951-55 Chief engineer at the Secretariat of the Architectural Council, and Assiant, later lecturer at the Technical University of Budapest, Faculty of Architecture

1955-57 Designer at the Office for Planning Residential and Communal Buildings (LAKÓTERV), Budapest

1958-60 Deputy director at the Institute for Restoration of Historical Monuments, Budapest

1961-62 Assistant at the London County Council, Housing Department

1963-69 Head of Research and Development Group, Technical Department, LAKÓTERV Budapest

1970-91 Senior Principal Scientific Officer. Technical University; Budapest; Faculty of Architecture

1974-91 University Professor at the Technical University of Budapest; Faculty of Architecture

== Data of scientific degrees; social obligations, medals ==
Finished first postgraduation (Candidate's Degree) in 1964. Thesis on Modular Coordination was accepted by the TMB (i.e.: Scientific Assessment Board appointed to the Hungarian Academy of Sciences) in 1965. Obtained the degree „Candidate of Technical Sciences” in 1965. Number of diploma: TMB 3117/1965.

Obtained the degree „Doctor Technicae” from the Technical University of Budapest 17 May 1966. Number of diploma: 67/1966.

Finished second postgraduation (Doctor's Degree) in 1967. Doctoral thesis entitled „Blind manufacture. An approach to automation through double coordination” was presented at the TMB on 1 May 1967. Degree „Doctor of Technical Sciences” at the end of 1969.

Participated in the work of the Department of Technical Sciences of the Hungarian Academy of Science as a member of the Committee of Theory of Architecture and as the Secretary of the Committee of Building Science.

Between 1964-67 Member of the International Modular Group (C.I.B. Working Committee W.24.)

== Data of scientific research work ==
From 1962 on the following themes:

Modular coordination;

Double coordination: Specific questions of automation in building industry;

Tissue structures: theory and practice of open system industrialization;

Specific problems of mass-housing in the developing countries.

Author a number of publications, Works published in English:

The inherent contradictions of the closed systems of prefabrication and the future trends of evolution.

Towards Industrialized Building. Proceedings of the third CIB Congress, Copenhagen 1965. Elsevier Publishing Company, Amsterdam 1966. pp. 295–296.

Tissue structures. Vol. I. Modular variations on a span-indifferent structural system. LAKÓTERV, Budapest, 1967. 120 pages

Tissue structures. Vol. II. Blind Manufacture. An approach to automation through double coordination. LAKÓTERV, Budapest, 1967. 80 pages

Tissue structures, Vol. III. Blind manufacture II. An adaptation of the Gutenberg principle to building industry. LAKÓTERV. Budapest 1969. 206 pages

Tissue structures: An approach to solving problems of masshousing in the developing countries, Scientific World. 1969

Some technological and economic aspects of changing the structure of building industry in developing countries. LAKÓTERV July 1969. 30 pages
