= Dominique Gauzin-Müller =

French architect and critic

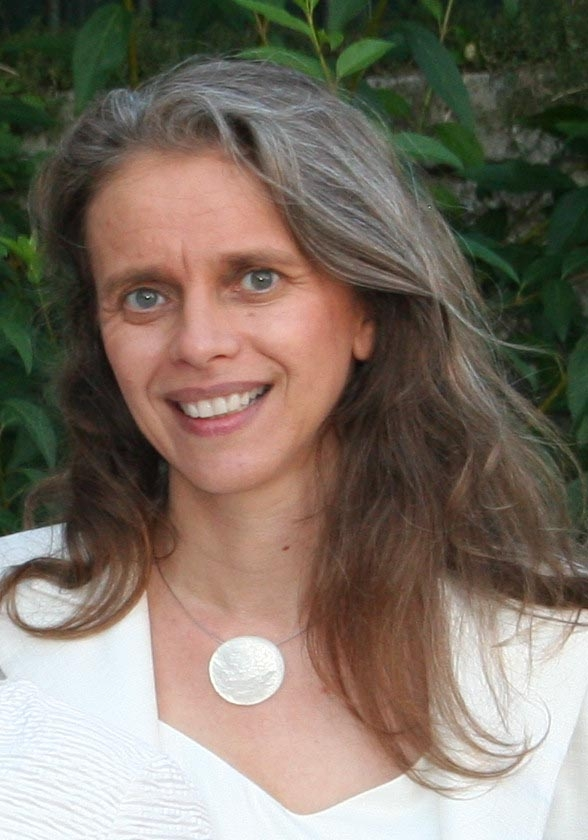
Dominique Gauzin-Müller

Dominique Gauzin-Müller (born 1960) is a French architect and architectural critic, focusing on wood and sustainability in architecture and urbanism. She is the author of several books on these subjects, which have been translated into several languages. She wrote Construire avec le Bois (1999), L'architecture écologique (2001), 25 maisons en bois (2003) and 25 maisons écologique (2005).

== Early life and education ==
Dominique Gauzin-Müller was born in Vincennes, near Paris, but grew up in Saint-Céré, Lot . She studied architecture at the École d'architecture Paris-Tolbiac, under Roland Schweizer, the French specialist in wooden buildings, and Marion Tournon-Branly. 1984 she received a "Diplôme" and in 1985 a "Certificat d'études approfondies" (Masters) in wooden building from the same university. In 1983, she attended a seminar called "Energy planning and the environment" at the Summer University of Oslo. Since her marriage to a German engineer (1986), she lives in Stuttgart, Germany.

== Career ==
Dominique Gauzin-Müller worked as an architect for a few years, before devoting herself primarily to writing and teaching. She lectured at the University of Stuttgart between 1988 and 1989.

She published Le Bois dans la Construction in 1990. Between 1998 and 2004, Gauzin-Müller was the editor of the book Jean Prouvé - Complete Works, in three volumes, by Peter Sulzer. Since 1994 she has organized over 40 study tours for French architects and engineers in Germany and in the Vorarlberg, including the French National Order of Architects and the National Committee for Development the promotion of Wood (CNDB). In 1995, she received the Prix Henri Courbot for her book Le Bois dans la construction. In 1997 she published, in German, Behnisch & Partner 50 Jahre Architektur on the German architect Günter Behnisch, a book which received the prize awarded to the "50 most beautiful books of Germany". In 1999, Gauzin-Müller published Construire avec le Bois, a work for which she received the Prix Henri Le Même awarded by the French Académie d'architecture. The same year, she participated in the competition for the Mirecourt High School, Stuttgart, with the architectural firm Jockers. Her most successful book, L'Architecture Écologique, was published in 2001 and has since been translated into six languages, including Chinese. Gauzin-Müller participated as co-designer in the project of the Waste-Recovery Center of the "Parc d'activités" in Mayenne, led by Joel Gimbert.

In 2003 she published 25 Maisons en Bois, translated into three languages, and in 2005 25 Maisons Écologiques translated into five languages. In 2007, the French Académie d'architecture awarded her the Prix Dejean "for studies and research on the implementation of the principles of sustainable development to architecture and urbanism". In addition to her personal works, Gauzin-Müller has published essays in numerous books, including "Une Terre humaine" in L'Architecte e(s)t l'autre, "Développement durable dans l’architecture et l’urbanisme" and "Les énergies renouvelables dans le bâtiment" in the Neufert (2007), "L’exemple du Vorarlberg" in La maison individuelle, "L’architecture éco-responsable" in La science au présent 2008, une année d’actualité scientifique et technique of the Encyclopædia Universalis.

She works with several publishers, and has also published essays in community works such as "Les éléments des projets de construction" (Neufert, 2007) or the "Encyclopedia Universalis" (2008). Since the early 1980s, Gauzin-Müller has written for many European architectural magazines: D'Architectures (France), Techniques et architecture (France), Maisons à vivre (France), Séquence bois (France), Architecture intérieure créé (France), Le Moniteur des travaux publics et du bâtiment (France), L'Architettura naturale (Italy), Deutsche Bauzeitung (Germany), Detail (Germany), etc.

Gauzin-Müller, who gives talks all over Europe, was invited to several architectural universities, for example in Vienna, and La Coruña (Spain). From 2004 to 2007, she taught at the École Nationale Supérieure d'Architecture in Nancy. Currently, she is a professor at the Ecole Nationale Supérieure d'Architecture in Strasbourg.

Since its foundation in 2007, she is also the chief editor of the French architecture magazine écologiK, which deals with issues of sustainability in architecture and urban planning.
