= William J. Reese (architect) =

American architect (1943–2011

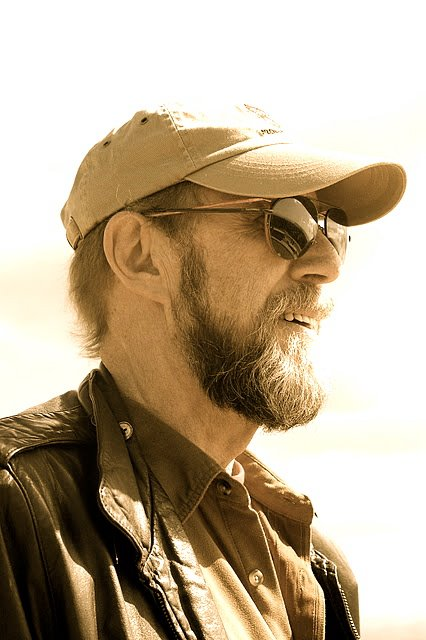
William J. Reese

William Jerome Reese (April 24, 1943 – November 30, 2011) was an American born architect, whose most important works were built in or near the eastern end of Long Island, New York, specifically in the Hamptons area. Although the body of his work includes traditional, post modern and classic architectural styles, he is best known for his modern buildings, many being borderline brutalism.

== Early life ==
Born in Coronado, California, on April 24, 1943, he was the son of Hope King Reese and Wilbur Roy Reese. The Reese family moved to Williamsburg, Virginia, when he was seven, and he attended James Blair High School before enrolling in the University of Virginia as an undergraduate. From 1966 to 1968, he served in the U.S. Navy on a search and rescue ship off the coast of Vietnam. Upon completion of his military service, he returned to school and graduated with bachelor's degree in architecture in 1971.

After receiving his professional certification in 1973, Bill spent several years working for architecture firms in the Charlottesville and Newport News area before relocating to La Jolla, California, in 1977. He practiced architecture in the San Diego area until 1982.

Reese believed the work of architect Rudolph Schindler to be of great importance and considered Schindler's contribution to the world of architecture to be monumental. He found in him a kindred spirit and was inspired by the freedom and simplicity of his designs.

Reese lived in one of Schindler's homes in the Pueblo Ribera complex in La Jolla, California in the early 1980s. The impact of Schindler's simplistic architectural style can be seen in many of Reese's designs, including the North Haven, New York home for which Reese was featured by Metropolitan Home magazine as one of the top 100 architects to have been published by the magazine.

== Later professional career ==
In 1982, Reese headed east to join his long-time friend and colleague Kirby Grimes and set up an office in Bridgehampton. He remained on the East End until 2006, when he returned to California and opened an office in La Jolla.

== Projects and awards ==
Over the years, Reese designed more than 225 projects, including single family residences, high-rise and low-rise apartment buildings and various commercial projects. His work was featured in numerous publications, including, among others, Home, House & Garden, Woman's Day, Glamour, and Metropolitan Home, in which his home in Shinnecock Hills was featured on the cover and chosen as House of the Year.

In 1993 The New York Times featured Reese's 6000 sq ft eco-house at Water Mill, Long Island. The house used off-the-shelf materials, and environmental features including a tall ventilation tower and a large concrete slab to provide radiant heat.

He was also the recipient of several design awards, including two from the American Institute of Architects.

== Bibliography ==
- August H. Muff, Glamour Making It Modern, Filipacchi Publishing, New York (May 20, 2009) pages 134 & 164
