= Constantinos Decavallas =

Greek modernist architect (1925–2023)

Constantinos Decavallas (1925 – February 2023) was a Greek modernist architect.

== Biography ==
Constantinos Decavallas was born in Athens in 1925. He studied at the School of Architecture of the National Technical University of Athens (N.T.U.A.) (1948), Columbia University (1953), and the University of London (1956). On returning to Greece, he worked on the Asteras tourist complex in Glyfada, then at the Ministry of Public Works in charge of the reconstruction of Santorini. From 1960 to 1969, he was the architect for the National Bank of Greece. From 1960, he has maintained an architectural and city-planning design practice.

In 1980, he became a professor at the N.T.U.A. School of Architecture. His four architectural "credos" are: incorporating a building into its natural environment and utilizing bioclimatic architecture; respect for the structural environment; organically incorporating visual arts into a building; and most importantly, the knowledge and joy an architect has in collaborating with a team.

Decavallas died in February 2023, at the age of 97.

== Works ==
- Astir Beach and Resort (Glyfada Beach, Attica, 1955–58)
- Bank of Crete Branch (Voukourestiou and Valaoritou Sts., Athens 1975–78)
- Exarchia Theatre (69 Themistokleous, Athens, 1987–90)
- M. Goulandris Vacation Home (Kavouri, Attica, 1968–71)
- M. P Nomikos Vacation Home since 2012 Santozeum Museum (Thira Town, Santorini, 1958–60)
- Nafsika Astir Pallas Hotel (Mikro Kavouri, Vouliagmeni, 1976–79)
