= Musa Konsulova =

Soviet and Ukrainian architect (1921–2019)

Musa Borysivna Konsulova (20 July 1921 – 18 March 2019) was a Ukrainian architect and researcher of architecture.

== Early life and education ==
Musa Konsulova was born on 20 July 1921 in Romanivka village, now Kostiantynivsky district of Donetsk region, Ukraine. In her youth, Konsulova studied music professionally. In 1946, she graduated from Moscow Architectural Institute.

== Career ==
From 1947 Konsulova worked as an architect at the Lviv branch of Dipromisto Institute. In the 1950s and 1960s, Konsulova was actively involved in the design of Lviv's public and residential buildings. In 1951–1952, she participated in the creation of a project for the construction of a new central square near Lviv Opera House which was not implemented.

From 1951 to 1957, Konsulova continued her studies at the graduate school of the Research Institute of Architectural Structures of the Academy of Civil Engineering in Kyiv. Since 1952 she was a Member of the Union of Architects of the Ukrainian SSR. In 1953–1956, Konsulova authored the projects of the restaurant in the Bohdan Khmelnytsky Central Culture and Recreation Park, as well as coffee shops in Stryj Park in Lviv.

In 1955–1957, she co-authored with an architect V. Goldstein a 7-story residential building on the street 700th Lviv anniversary (now V. Chornovil Avenue), 3.

In 1960, Konsulova presented the first experimental residential building with apartments on two levels at the exhibition in Kyiv.

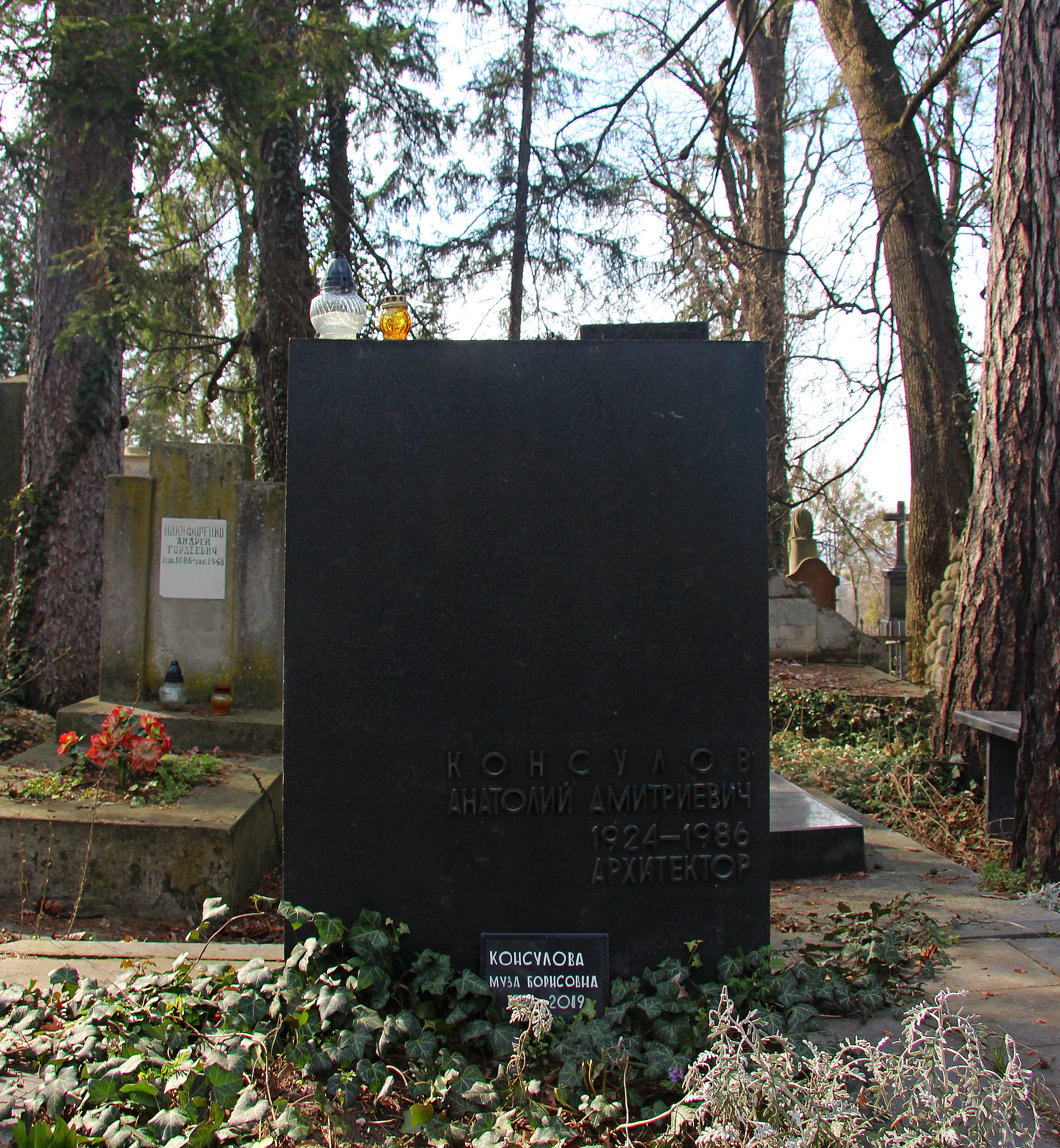
Konsulova's family gravestone

In 1962, she defended a dissertation on the topic "Low-rise apartment buildings with apartments on two levels" and received a diploma of candidate architectural sciences.

In 1966, Konsulova was approved as an associate professor of the Department of Architecture of Lviv Polytechnic Institute. The same year she was awarded the first prize at the Republican competition "Low-rise residential buildings for rural construction in Ukraine.

From 1966 to 1970, Konsulova worked on building educational buildings of the Lviv Polytechnic Institute, namely the General Technical Faculty building on O. Nevsky street (now Metropolitan Andrew), 5, and the Faculty of Energy building on the Myru street (now Stepana Bandera street) 28a.

In the 1970s, Konsulova developed restoration projects and castles known as the "Golden Horseshoe of Lviv Region" - in Olesk, Pidhirtsi, Zolochiv, Svirzh, Stary Selo.

In 1978, she was awarded the prize of the Council of Ministers of the USSR.

Konsulova has published a number of scientific articles in the journals “Visnyk of Lviv Polytechnic Institute” and “Stroitelstvo i arkhitektura”.

Musa Konsulova died on 18 March 2019 in Moscow, Russia at the age of 97. She is buried in Lychakiv Cemetery in Lviv, Ukraine.

== Personal life ==
Konsulova was married to an architect Anatolii Konsulov who is best known as a co-author of a monument to soldiers of the 1st Cavalry Army near Olesk, as well as a monument to Ivan Fyodorov in Lviv. In 1948, Konsulova gave birth to their daughter Natalia who later became an architect as well.
