= Prathima Manohar =

Prathima Manohar is a social entrepreneur and the founder of The Urban Vision, a think tank on cities. She was a contributing columnist on architecture, urban development and design for The Times of India. She had previously been a contributing correspondent with France24 and TF1 on the Indian economy, developmental and cultural issues.

Outside of her work as a social entrepreneur, Manohar is an architect, critic, writer and a TV journalist. She is an urban expert. As an urbanist, she has worked on pilot projects and researched on issues such as affordable housing, participatory planning and green cities.

She is the author of a monograph on the works of one of India's leading architects Hafeez Contractor. She has written for the opinion pages of the International Herald Tribune, Wall Street Journal and has reviewed for the Architecture Record .

Prathima holds a bachelor's degree in architecture. She was awarded Stanford University’s prestigious Draper Hills Fellowship on Democracy, Development, and the Rule of Law which is bestowed on rising international stars who work on issues related to Democracy and Development. She is also a Fellow at Harvard Kennedy School's Ash Center for Democratic Governance and Innovation.
