= List of Slovak architects =

Following is a list of notable architects from the country of Slovakia.

== A–M ==
- László Hudec (also known as Ladislav Hudec)
- Dušan Jurkovič

== N–Z ==
- Emery Roth
- Andrew Steiner
- Fridrich Weinwurm
- Ernst Wiesner (1890–1971)

== See also ==
- List of architects
- List of Slovaks
