= Heinz Hess =

German architect

- Born: June 2, 1922
- Died: May 3, 1992 (aged 69)
- Education: Karlsruhe University
- Occupation: Architect

Heinz Hess (June 2, 1922 – March 5, 1992) was a German architect best known for his involvement in the construction of 20 churches in and around Mannheim.

== Career ==
Hess began his study of architecture at Karlsruhe University in 1940, but interrupted his education between 1941 and 1945 to fight in the Second World War. He received his diploma in 1948 after resuming his studies under Otto Ernst Schweizer and Heinrich Müller, and became an assistant to Müller. In 1951, he presented his thesis and took employment in the civil service, where he worked alongside Horst Linde. In 1956, Hess accepted a position with the construction offices of the Roman Catholic Archdiocese of Freiburg, and from 1986 headed the organisation following the retirement of Hans Rolli. From 1972 to 1977, Hess also served as Chief of department in Heidelberg.

== Works ==
His works include:

- St.-Antonius-Kirche in Mannheim-Rheinau with Hans Rolli 1960
- St.-Theresia-Kirche in Mannheim-Pfingstberg 1961
- St.-Hildegard-Kirche in Mannheim-Käfertal 1961
- St.-Konrad-Kirche in Mannheim-Casterfeld 1964
- St.-Martin-Kirche in Mannheim-Luzenberg 1966
- Zwölf-Apostel-Kirche in Mannheim-Vogelstang 1969
- Enlargement of St.-Remigius-Kirche in Heddesheim

== Gallery ==
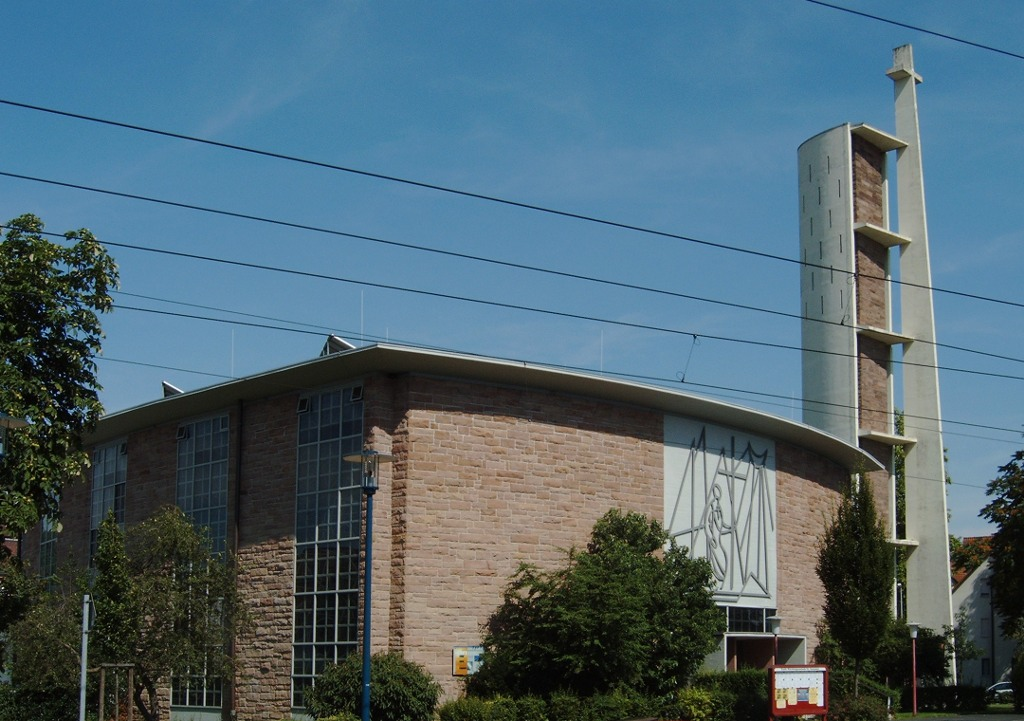
St.-Antonius-Kirche Mannheim-Rheinau

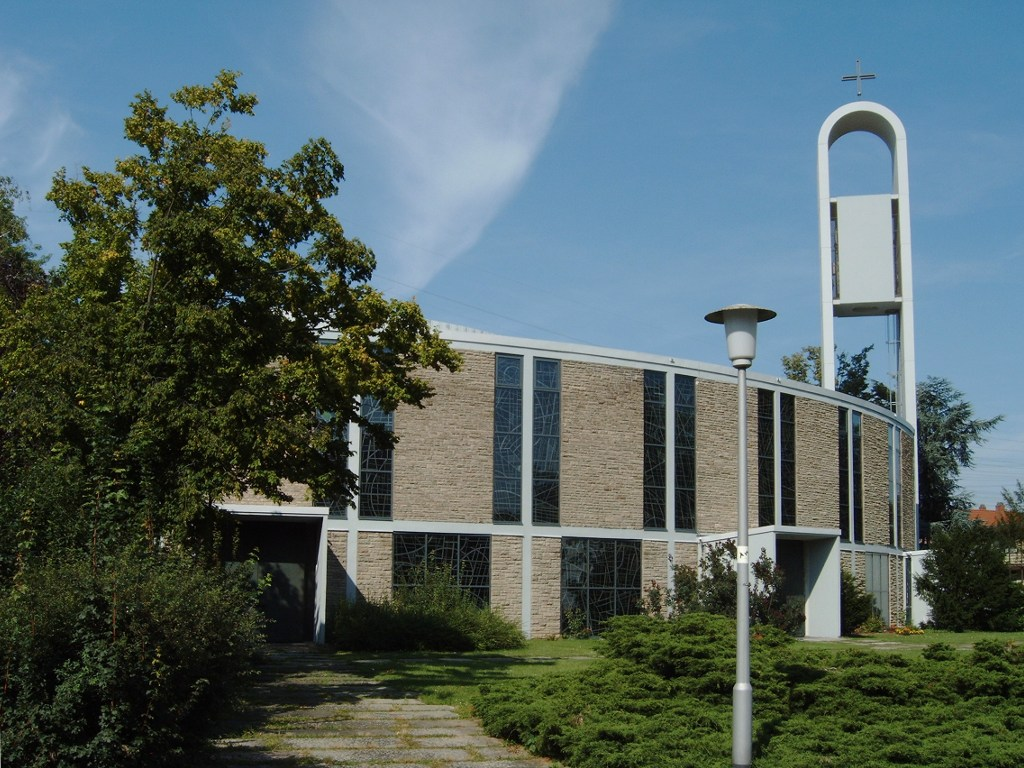
St.-Theresia-Kirche Mannheim-Pfingstberg

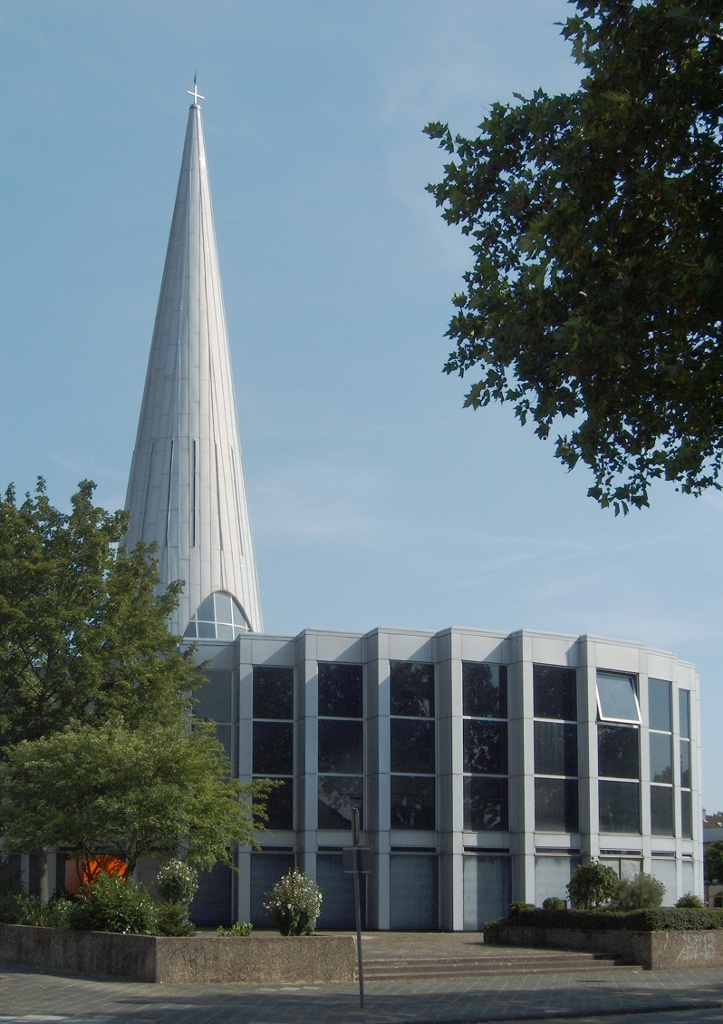
St.-Konrad-Kirche Mannheim-Casterfeld

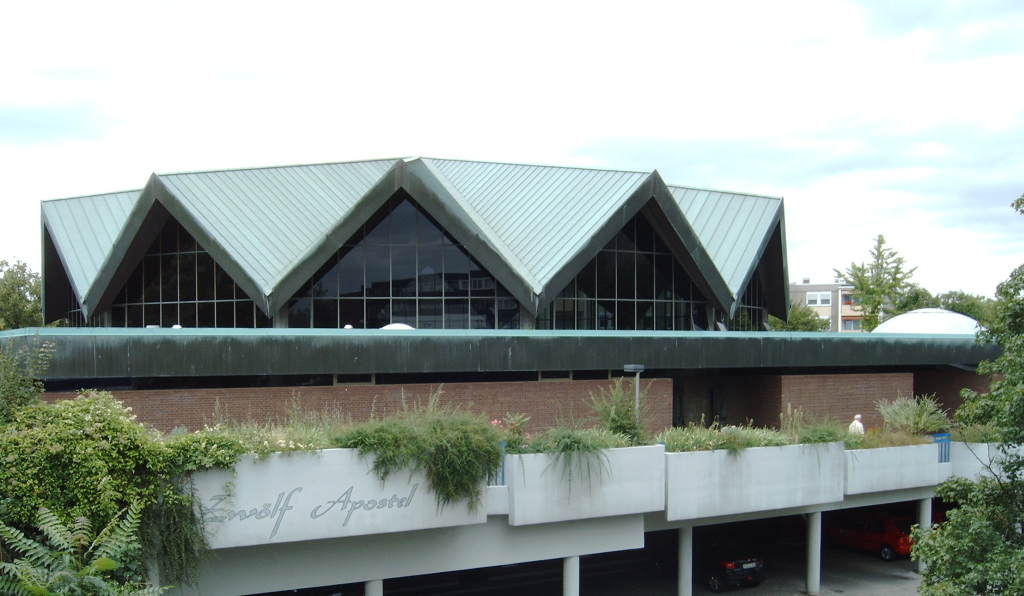
Zwölf-Apostel-Kirche Mannheim-Vogelstang
