= List of Belgian architects =

Following is a list of Belgian architects in alphabetical order.

== A–M ==
- Alphonse Balat (1818-1895)
- Jean-Baptiste de Béthune (1821-1894)
- Hendrik Beyaert (1823-1894)
- Francis Bonaert (1914-2012)
- Albert Bontridder (1921-2015)
- Victor Bourgeois (1897-1962)
- Renaat Braem (1910-2001)
- Cluysenaar family
- Jean-Pierre Cluysenaar (1811-1880)
- Christine Conix (born 1955)
- Xaveer De Geyter (born 1957)
- Louis Delacenserie (1838-1909)
- Luc Deleu (born 1944)
- Laurent-Benoît Dewez (1731-1812)
- Wim Goes
- Paul Hankar (1859-1901)
- Victor Horta (1861-1947)
- Jan Keldermans
- Lucien Kroll (1927-2022)
- François Massau

== N–Z ==
- Paul Neefs (1933-2009)
- Johan Neerman (born 1959)
- Philippe Neerman (1930-2011)
- Charles Nissens (1858-1919)
- Joseph Poelaert (1817-1879)
- Dita Roque-Gourary (1915-2010)
- Paul Saintenoy (1862-1952)
- Christian Satin (born 1946)
- Gustave Strauven (1878-1919)
- Claude Strebelle (1917-2010)
- Ferdinand Truyman (1857-1939)
- Alphonse Vanden Eynde (1884-1951)
- Henry Van de Velde (1863-1957)
- Henri van Dievoet (1869-1931)
- Frans Van Dijk (1853-1939)
- Bob Van Reeth (1943–2025)
- Charles van Rysselberghe (1850-1920)
- Octave van Rysselberghe (1855-1929)
- Antoine Varlet (1893-1940)
- Jean-Jacques Winders (1849-1936)

== See also ==
- List of architects
