= Emmanuel Hiel =

Flemish poet and writer

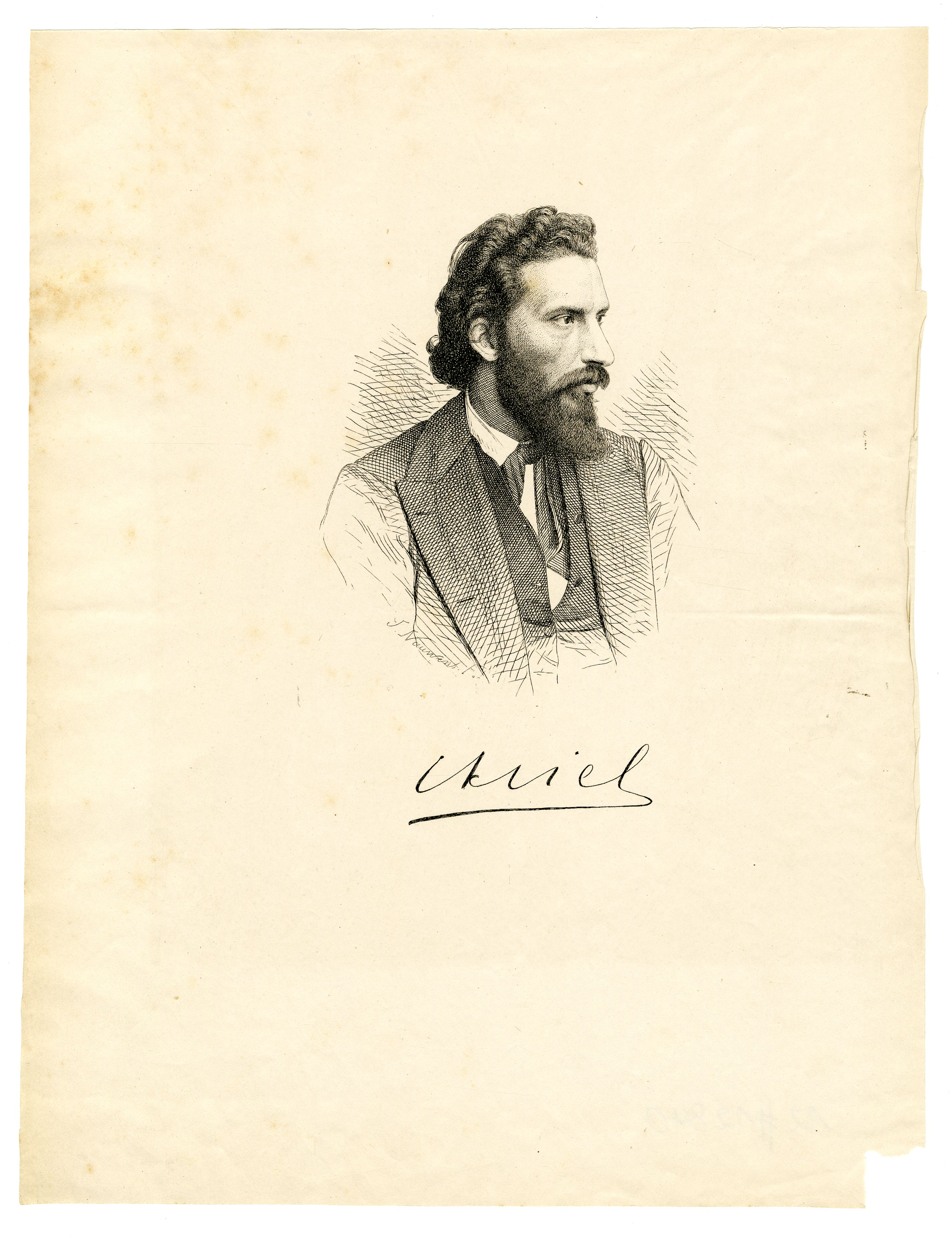
- Emmanuel Hiel
- Born: 30 May 1834; Sint-Gillis-bij-Dendermonde, Belgium
- Died: 27 August 1899 (aged 65); Schaerbeek, Belgium
- Occupations: poet, writer

Emmanuel Hiel (30 May 1834 – 27 August 1899), was a Flemish-Dutch poet and prose writer.

Hiel was born at Sint-Gillis-bij-Dendermonde. During his life he held various jobs, from teacher and government official to journalist and bookseller, busily writing all the time both for the theatre and the magazines of North and South Netherlands. His last posts were those of librarian at the Industrial Museum and professor of declamation at the Conservatoire in Brussels.

Hiel took an active and prominent part in the so-called Flemish movement in Belgium, and his name is constantly associated with those of Jan van Beers, Jan Frans Willems, and Peter Benoit. Benoit set some of Hiel's verses to music, notably in his oratorios Lucifer (performed in London at the Royal Albert Hall and elsewhere) and De Schelde ("The Scheldt"). The Dutch composer Richard Hol (of Utrecht) composed music for Hiel's Ode to Liberty, and van Gheluwe used Hiel's verses in his Songs for Big and Small Folk (second edition, much enlarged, 1879). That music greatly contributed the popularity of Hiel's writing in schools and among Belgian choral societies.

Hiel also translated several foreign lyrics. His rendering of Tennyson's Dora was published in Antwerp around 1871. For the national festival of 1880 at Brussels, to commemorate the fiftieth anniversary of Belgian independence, Hiel composed two cantatas, Belgenland ("The Land of the Belgians") and Rer Belgenland ("Honour to Belgium"), which, set to music, were much appreciated.

Hiel's efforts to counteract Walloon influences and bring about a rapprochement between the Netherlanders in the north and the Teutonic racial sympathizers across the Rhine made him very popular with both. A volume of his best poems was in 1874 the first in a collection of Dutch authors published in Leipzig, Germany.

He died in 1899 at Schaerbeek.

== Bibliography ==
Among his better-known poetic works are:

- Looverkens ("Leaflets," 1857)
- Nieuwe Liedekens ("New Poesies," 1861)
- Gedichten ("Poems," 1863)
- Psalmen, Zangen, en Oratorios ("Psalms, Songs, and Oratorios," 1869)
- De Wind (1869), an inspiriting cantata, which had a large measure of success and was crowned
- De Liefde in Leven ("Love in Life," 1870)
- Elle and Isa (two musical dramas, 1874)
- Liederen voor Groote en Kleine Kinderen ("Songs for Big and Small Folk," 1879)
- Jakoba van Beieren ("Jacquelein of Bavaria," a poetic drama, 1880)
- Mathilda van Denemarken (a lyrical drama, 1890)

His collected poetical works were published in three volumes at Roeselare in 1885.

== See also ==
- Flemish literature
