= Staf Pyl =

Belgian ceramist and stained glass artist

- Born: Gustaaf Albertus Pyl; April 14, 1923; Sint-Niklaas, Belgium
- Died: January 14, 2007 (aged 83); Sint-Niklaas, Belgium
- Education: Higher Institute Sint-Lucas, Ghent
- Known for: Stained glass, ceramics, glass-in-concrete
- Movement: Post-war religious and monumental art
- Spouse: Yvonne Cools

Gustaaf Albertus "Staf" Pyl (14 April 1923 – 14 January 2007) was a Belgian ceramist and stained glass artist active primarily in East Flanders, Belgium. He is best known for monumental stained glass and glass-in-concrete works integrated into churches and public buildings. According to art-historical and heritage sources, Pyl belongs to the post-Second World War renewal of Flemish stained glass, characterized by architectural integration and renewed attention to color and light. Like his contemporaries Michel Martens and Armand Blondeel, he was part of a generation of artists who, from the 1970s onward, increasingly approached glass as an artistic medium beyond its traditional ecclesiastical function.

== Biography ==
Pyl was born in Sint-Niklaas on 14 April 1923. He studied decorative arts and drawing at the Sint-Lucasinstituut in Ghent. His education was interrupted during World War II when he was subjected to forced labor in Germany.

After the war, he returned to Sint-Niklaas and established himself as an independent artist. In the economically difficult post-war period he increasingly focused on applied and monumental arts, working from an atelier at his home in Sint-Niklaas, where he executed both design and production himself, assisted by his wife Yvonne Cools.

== Works ==
Pyl’s career developed during a period of significant transformation in Belgian religious and monumental art following the Second World War. Reconstruction, modernist architecture and changing liturgical ideas encouraged artists to explore new materials and visual languages. In stained glass, this resulted in a gradual shift away from historicist narrative toward abstraction and architectural integration.

Studies of post-war stained glass identify glass-in-concrete as a characteristic technique of the reconstruction period, enabling large-scale compositions with strong color and light effects suited to modern buildings. Within this broader context, Pyl is discussed in general surveys of Belgian glass art as part of a generation that redefined stained glass as an artistic medium rather than a purely decorative craft.

Although originally trained with a strong emphasis on drawing and painting, Pyl developed a practice centered on architectural glass. In his biographical account he described his approach as “painting with glass, lead and light.” His stained glass is characterized by carefully controlled color harmonies and a pronounced graphic use of lead lines, which function as compositional elements rather than merely technical necessities. From the 1950s onward, he increasingly employed glass-in-concrete techniques, aligning his work with broader developments in post-war monumental glass and modernist architecture.

Pyl executed numerous commissions in churches and public institutions across Flanders. He is particularly known for the monumental stained glass for the Christus-Koningkerk in Sint-Niklaas and architectural glass and glass-in-concrete works in schools, care institutions and administrative buildings in the Waasland region.

== Legacy ==
Later scholarly and curatorial attention has emphasized Pyl’s contribution to the post-war renewal of stained glass in Flanders, particularly his integration of modernist tendencies within monumental and religious contexts. His designs and preparatory drawings are preserved in the collections of the Flemish Architecture Institute, supporting ongoing research into post-war monumental art and stained glass in Belgium. His work fits within the broader evolution of Belgian stained glass documented by the Corpus Vitrearum project, which recognizes the post-war period as a distinct and historically significant phase in the medium’s development.

== Gallery ==
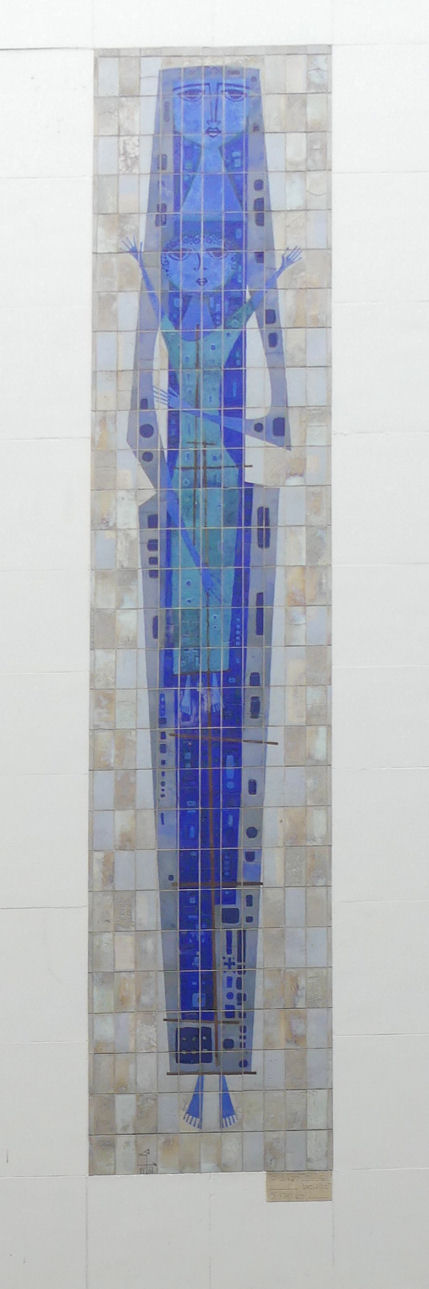
Ceramic work, Our Lady of the Berkenboom.

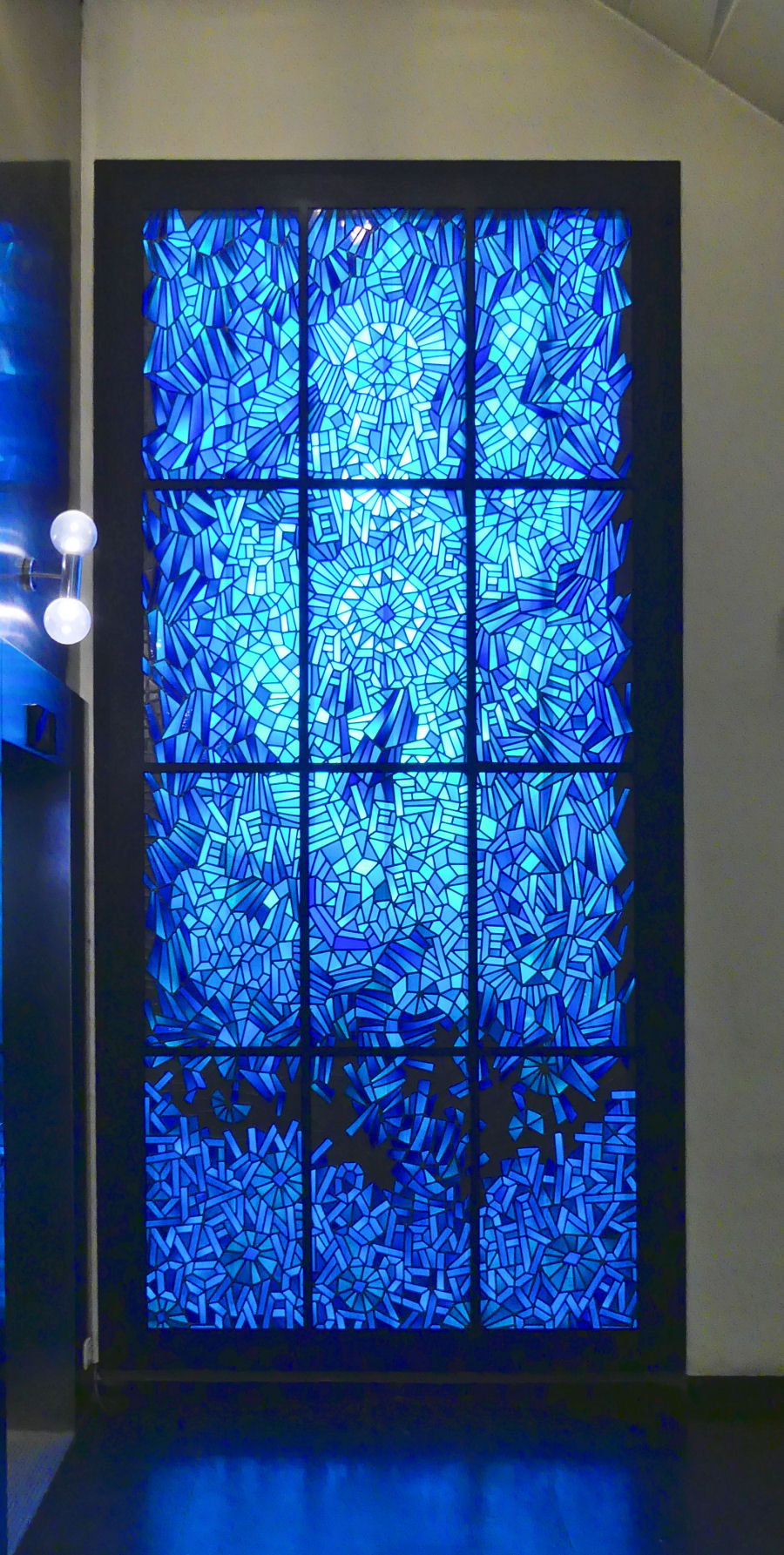
Stained glass, Sint-Niklaas Library.

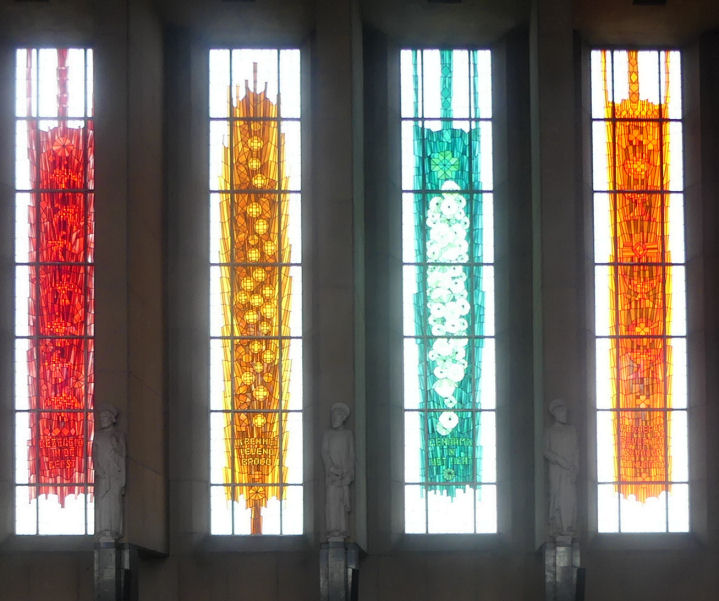
Stained glass, Christus-Koningkerk, Sint-Niklaas.
