= Couwelaar Castle =

Castle in Antwerp, Belgium

- Te Couwelaar
- Deurne, Belgium
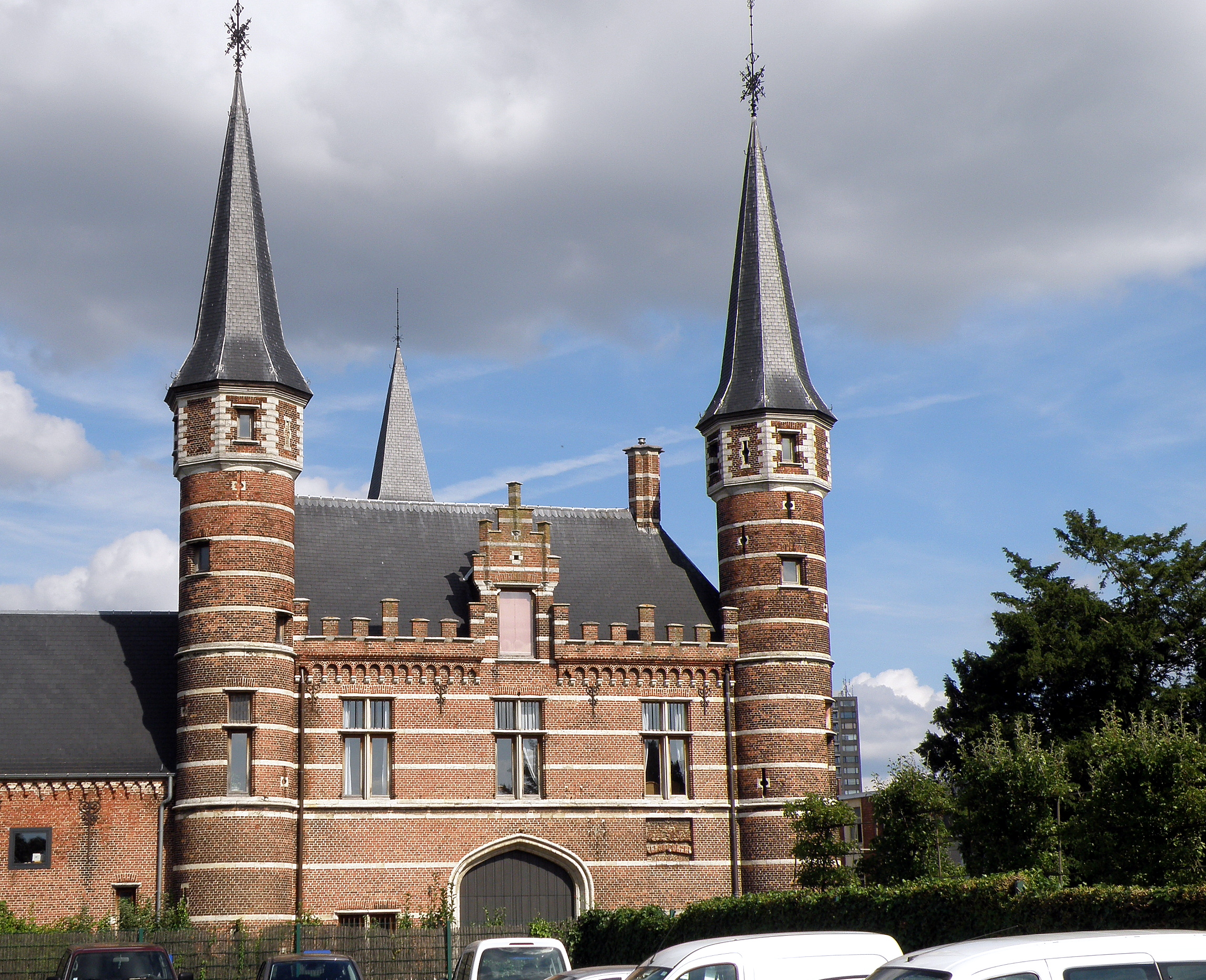
- Couwelaar Castle

Site information
- Type: Castle

Location
- Coordinates: 51.228°N 4.455°E

Site history
- Built: before 1402

Couwelaar Castle (Dutch: Te Couwelaar), also known as De Drie Torekens (The Three Turrets), is a castle in the Deurne district of Antwerp. The castle is L-shaped and consists of a main building with wings, as well as several outbuildings including a coach house. The main building is characterized by two round towers at the front and a built-in, square tower at the rear. Over the centuries, the castle has been extensively altered and restored several times and has stylistic elements of the Neo-Renaissance and Rococo, among others. Couwelaar Castle is a historical monument.

== History ==
The first mentions of a Couwelaar estate date to the beginning of the 15th century: in 1402 it is recorded as belonging to Pieter van Immerseel. It later passed to Pieter de Francques, a merchant from Antwerp, and then to his son Raphaël. In 1584, Couwelaar was sold in the Vrijdagmarkt. In any event, in 1606 it was owned by Gilles Du Mont, a cloth merchant who had also recently acquired the nearby castle of Bisschoppenhof. The Du Monts significantly improved the castle by adding six towers and laying out gardens and fish ponds.

Couwelaar changed hands several times in the following years. Pedro de Man, a former schepen (alderman) of Antwerp, had the castle thoroughly restored in 1766, in classical style. Four of the towers were in poor repair and were demolished and a new moat, among other things, was added. In 1848, a pleasure garden in the style of the Italian Neo-Renaissance was commissioned by John della Faille de Leverghem and his wife, who had purchased the castle two years earlier. They also had the castle itself renovated in the style of the Flemish Neo-Renaissance.

The real estate company Crédit Foncier d'Anvers acquired the castle in 1913 and had the moats filled in. In 1927, the castle ultimately became the property of the municipality, which until 1970 used it for administrative services and as a workshop and storage. Repairs were carried out in 1986–88, particularly to the towers and roofs. In the early 21st century the castle was sold to a group of new owners who pledged to restore it without impairing its historic character, and it has been divided into five cohousing apartments.

== Sources ==
- "Kasteel Te Couwelaar" (in Dutch). De Inventaris van het Bouwkundig Erfgoed.
