= Christine Conix =

Belgian architect

- Born: 1955 (age 70–71)
- Education: Hoger Instituut voor Architectuurwetenschappen Henry van de Velde
- Occupation: Architect
- Awards: Won contract out of 28 firms to redesign Vrije Universiteit Brussel
- Practice: Architecture
- Buildings: Atomium
- Projects: Redesign of Moroccan city of Nador

Christine Conix (born 1955) is a Belgian architect whose projects have been described as innovative and diverse and creative. She created her firm Conix Architects in 1979 in the Antwerp city of Wilrijk; by 2007, her firm employed 67 people and by 2014, it had offices in Brussels, Warsaw, Rotterdam, Terneuzen, with the head office in Antwerp. In 2013, Conix architects won a contract to rebuild a Moroccan city named Nador to transform it into a center for economics and tourism, which involves constructing critical infrastructure such as houses, schools, and hospitals. Conix Architects designed a renovation and expansion for the Atomium in Belgium, a structure originally built for the 1958 World's Fair in Brussels. It designed the Belgian pavilion at the World Expo in Shanghai in 2010. Her firm won a contest among 28 architectural firms agencies for architectural work relating to the Vrije Universiteit Brussel. Conix believes intuition should play a large role in architectural design, and believes in sustainability, and sees no significant difference between men and women today in the field of architecture. She studied architecture at the Hoger Instituut voor Architectuurwetenschappen Henry van de Velde in Antwerp.

== Notable works ==
- Sterckshof silver museum, renovation and new interior design, Deurne (2007–2015)
- Renovation and extension 4th European school, Brussels (2006 –...) (JV 4à4: Conix Architects (Pilot), Archi 2000, Duijsens Meyer Viol, Atelier Du Sart Tilman, Marcq & Roba)
- Glass House, renovation and reconversion of modernist office building into residential development, Antwerp (2009–2011)
- Ocean's Four Apartments, Gdańsk (Poland) (2008–2011)
- Belgian EU pavilion for Expo 2010, Shanghai (China) (2008–2010) (in association with the JV Interbuild – Realys)
- Mixed development London Tower, Antwerp (2006–2010)
- CX series (Duscholux), sanitary collection, rewarded with a 'Good Design Award' (2007-2009)
- W16, renovation and extension of an office building for BKCP), Brussels (2005–2009)
- Mercelis, new library and residential development, Elsene (2005-2009)
- Master planning industrial site, construction and renovation several offices and industrial buildings for Umicore, Hoboken (2005–2009)
- Conversion Wool Weaver's chapel into flagship store for McGregor Women, Ghent (2007)
- Renovation Atomium and new pavilion, Brussels (2004–2007)
- Renovation goods station and new head office for Bank J. Van Breda & Co., Antwerp (2003–2007)
- Mixed development Hoopnatie, Antwerp (1999–2006), used as a film location for Loft
- Renovation of an old Tuscan farm and reconversion into guesthouse, Ferranesi, Asciano (Italy) (2001-2003)
- New private house in historical Cogels Osylei, Antwerp (1990–1992)
- New private house in Antwerp, Wilrijk, Pater Verbiststraat (1989)
