= St Joseph College, Turnhout =

Coordinates: 51.321812°N 4.92181°E

St Joseph College
- Sint-Jozefcollege
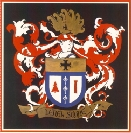
- Turnhout, Antwerp; Belgium

Information
- Type: Private Roman Catholic non-profit coeducational Primary and Secondary school
- Religious affiliation: Roman Catholic (Jesuit)
- Established: 1845; 181 years ago
- Founder: Society of Jesus
- Campus: Suburban
- Website: St Joseph College
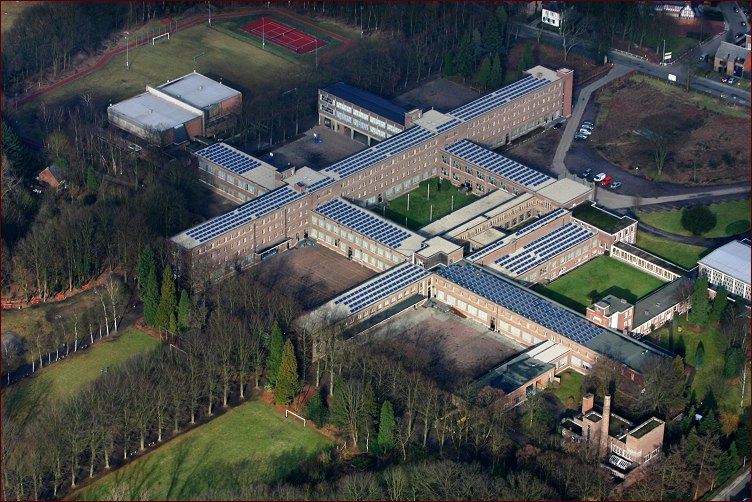

St Joseph College (Dutch: Sint-Jozefcollege) is a Roman Catholic secondary school in Turnhout, Belgium. It was founded by the Society of Jesus in 1845 and was rebuilt in the same style as Xaverius College in Borgerhout.

== History ==
As early as 1639, there was a Latin school in the area. This lasted until the 1796 and the Napoleonic Wars.

In 1845 a landowner, Maria de Nef, asked the Jesuits to take over the school. It was re-established as the Collegium Sancti Josephi Turnholtanum. Over the following 90 years, its campus grew in size to accommodate the increasing student population. In 1935, a new school was built on a 22-acre site on the outskirts of the city. In 1941, this was expanded and in 1958 a new primary school was built.

Originally, it only taught Greek and Latin. In 1959, sciences were introduced and in 1985 it became co-educational.

== Alumni ==
Notable former students include:

- Jos Geysels
- Paul Janssen
- Paul Neefs
- Edward Schillebeeckx
- Paul Stoffels
- Guy Van Nueten
- Christian Van Thillo

== Gallery ==
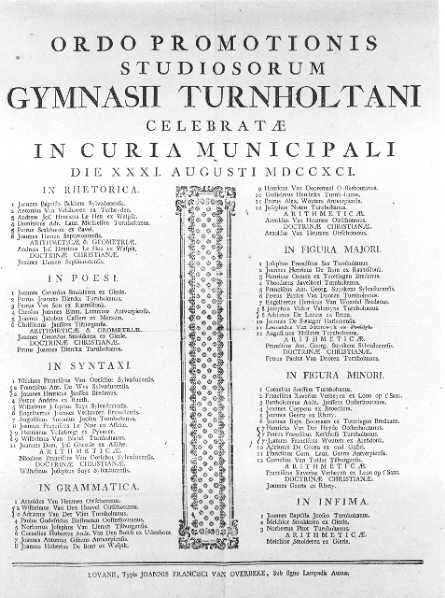
Original Latin School Charter

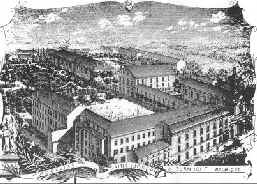
Old College drawing

== See also ==
- List of Jesuit sites in Belgium
- Xaverius College
- Diocese of Antwerp
