= Sterckshof =

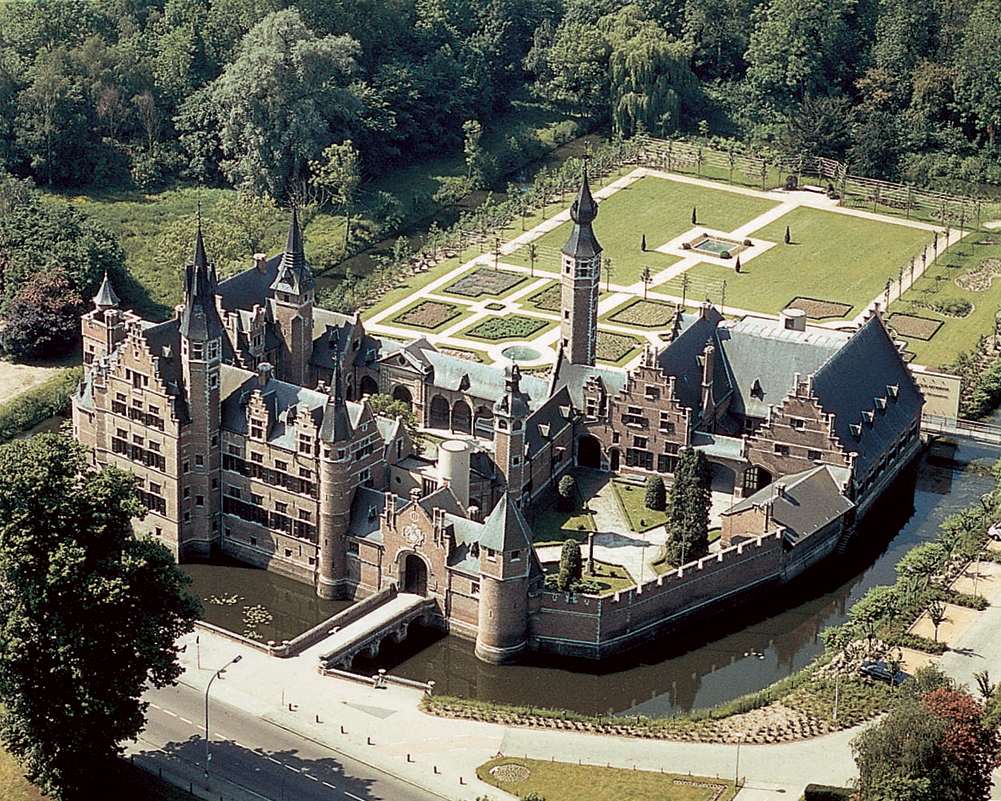

- Location within Belgium

General information
- Location: Deurne, Antwerp, Belgium
- Coordinates: 51.214992°N 4.462777°E
- Construction started: 1524
- Renovated: 1930s

The Sterckshof castle is in Deurne, Antwerp, Belgium. From 1994 to 2014 it housed the Sterckshof silver museum of the province of Antwerp. Built on the site of a much older castle, or great house, the present building is a reconstruction erected in the 1920s.

== History ==
Sterckshof is about 6 kilometres (3.7 mi) east of Antwerp city centre. It is situated at an altitude of 3 metres (9.8 ft) above sea level. From as early as the 13th century the site of the castle was occupied by the fortified "Hooftvunder" farmhouse, surrounded by a moat. It was probably used to defend a nearby wooden bridge over the Grote Schijn River.

In 1523 it was described as a farm with a house, brewery, moat, ponds, fishery, etc. That year it purchased by Gerard Sterck, who put up picturesque buildings with a castle, towers and turrets, and called it Sterckshof, a name it retains today. Gerard's grandson was Guillaume de Berghes, bishop of Antwerp. In Sterck's monument in Antwerp cathedral he is described as a knight, and lord of Busquoy, Wyneghem, Casterlé and Hooft-Vundere. Sterck was a merchant, banker and adviser to Emperor Charles V. Another owner, Jacob Edelheer, furnished the castle with art collections and scientific collections.

Unlike other castles in Antwerp, the Sterckshof was not destroyed during the wars of the 16th and 17th centuries, but it was neglected during a dispute between the heirs after the owner, Jacob van Lemens, died childless in 1664. From 1693 Sterckshof was owned by the Jesuits of Lier, but the castle was damaged or allowed to deteriorate during the war of the Austrian Succession (1740–1748). After the dissolution of the Jesuit Order, the estate was sold in 1776 to the banker Jan Baptist Cogels, who merged it with his Ter Rivieren estate. By the 1880s the buildings, long uninhabited, were no more than ruins.

== Owned by the province ==
In 1921 the Province of Antwerp bought the Ter Rivieren estate, with the Sterckshof castle, to make it into the current Rivierenhof park. Of the Sterckshof all that was standing was the floor of a tower, the entrance gate and some ramshackle outbuildings. In 1922 the architect JA Van der Gucht submitted plans for reconstruction. Using old pictures and archaeological discoveries, in the 1930s the building rose as an evocative reconstruction. The reconstructed building with its red brick turrets and courtyards is set in formal gardens surrounded by a moat, conveying an impression of the houses of the wealthy in the 16th century.

The municipality of Deurne declined to use the building for their town hall. In 1926 the idea of using it for the province's technical department was explored but rejected since the building was not suitable. The idea of using it for a dairy was also rejected. Eventually, in 1934 an Association was founded to established a Museum of Flemish Civilization. The Sterckshof was transferred to the association on 21 May 1938 and it was immediately opened to the public. Joseph De Beer, the honorary curator, moved into the house and began acquiring what became a huge and disparate collection of archaeological, natural history, ethnology and art and crafts objects.

From 1951 the state began funding the museum. When De Beer died in February 1953 the original association was liquidated and the castle was taken over by the province of Antwerp. At first it housed the Province's Sterckshof Museum of Art Crafts, and later the Province's Sterckshof silver museum. The museum's displays covered techniques for working the metal and domestic and religious uses. It also included a silversmith's workshop. The museum exhibited Belgian silver and pewter wares from the 16th to 21st centuries, and also some fine antique furnishings. The museum was unable to expand on the site due to planning restrictions, so was closed in 2014 and merged with the Antwerp Diamond Museum to create the DIVA Museum for Diamonds, Jewellery and Silver, located in Antwerp city centre.

After the silver museum moved out, the province put the castle on the market, with an asking price of 4.5 million euros; in 2017 the Flemish government approved 2 million euros in renovation subsidies to sweeten the offer. As of August 2019 a buyer had still not been found.

== Gallery ==
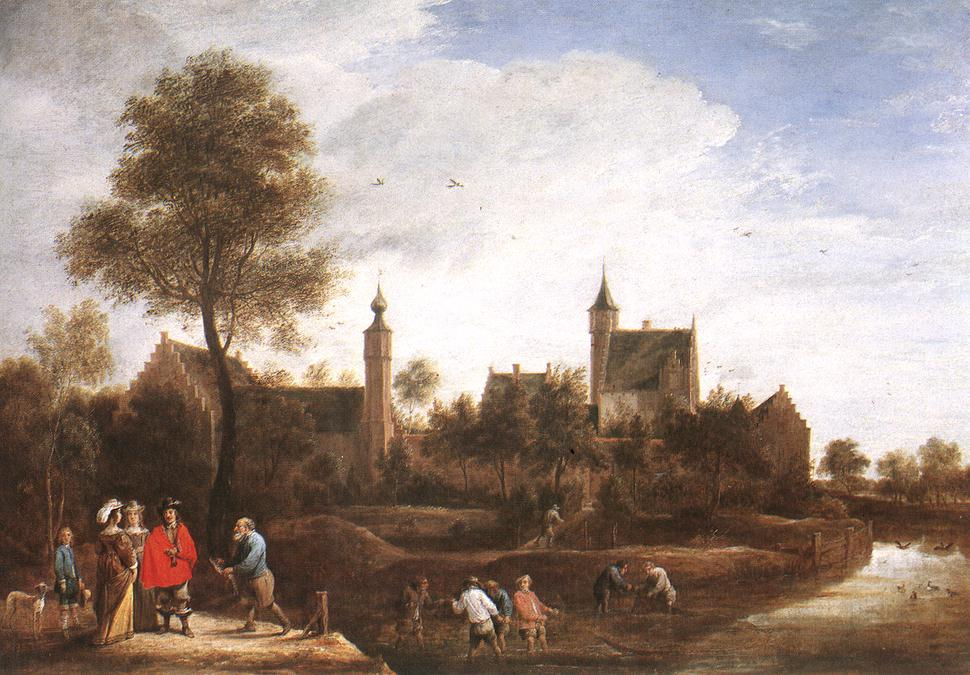
David Teniers the Younger, View of the garden side of the Sterckshof, 1650, London, National Gallery

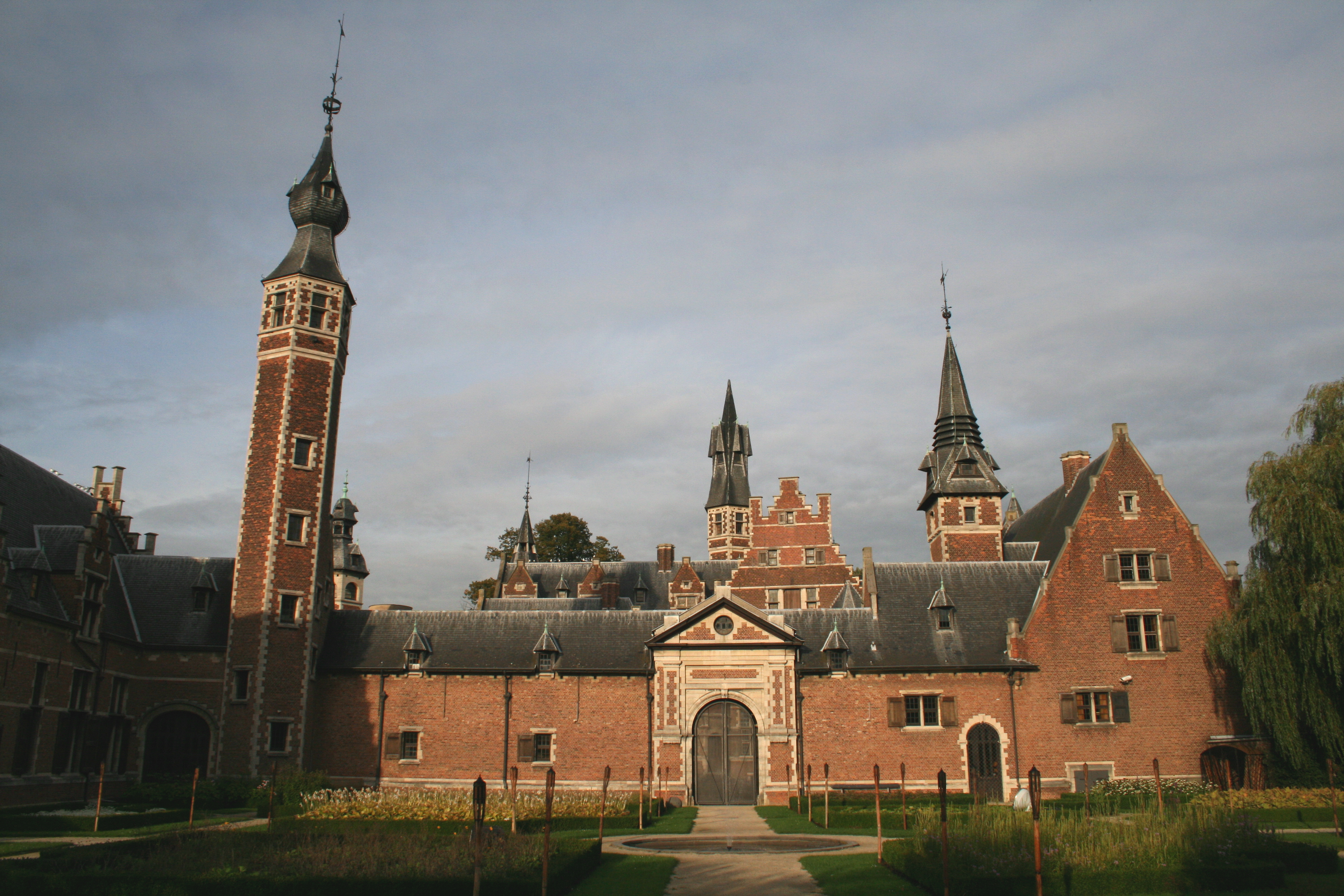
Provinciaal Museum Kunstambachten, Sterckshof

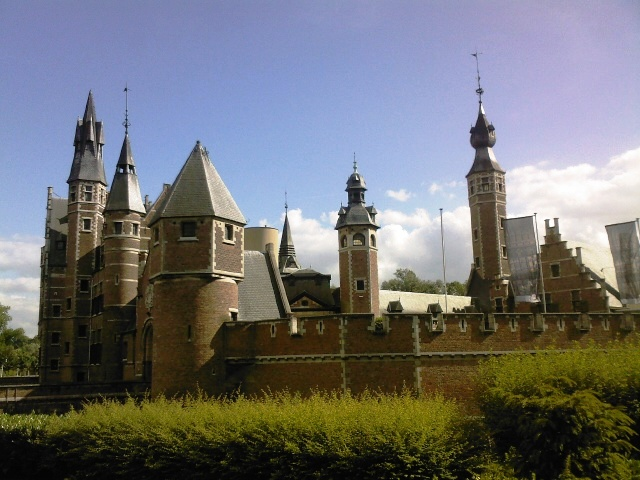
2008

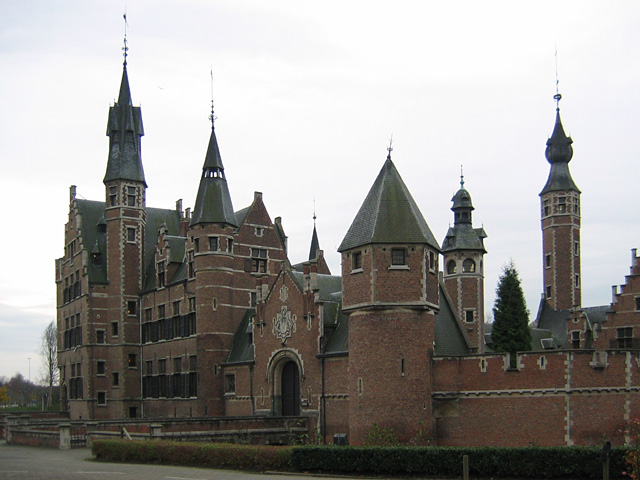
2006

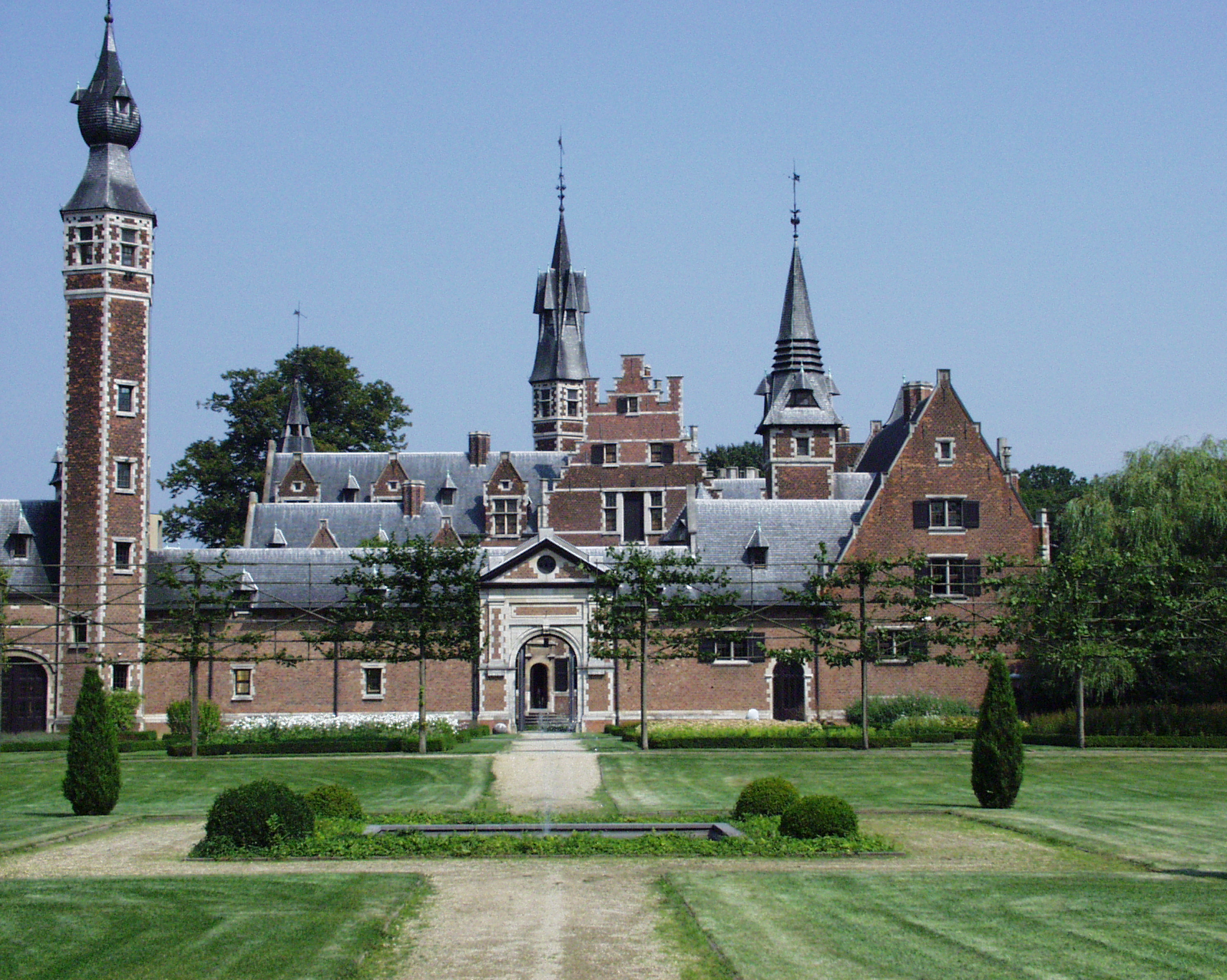
2009

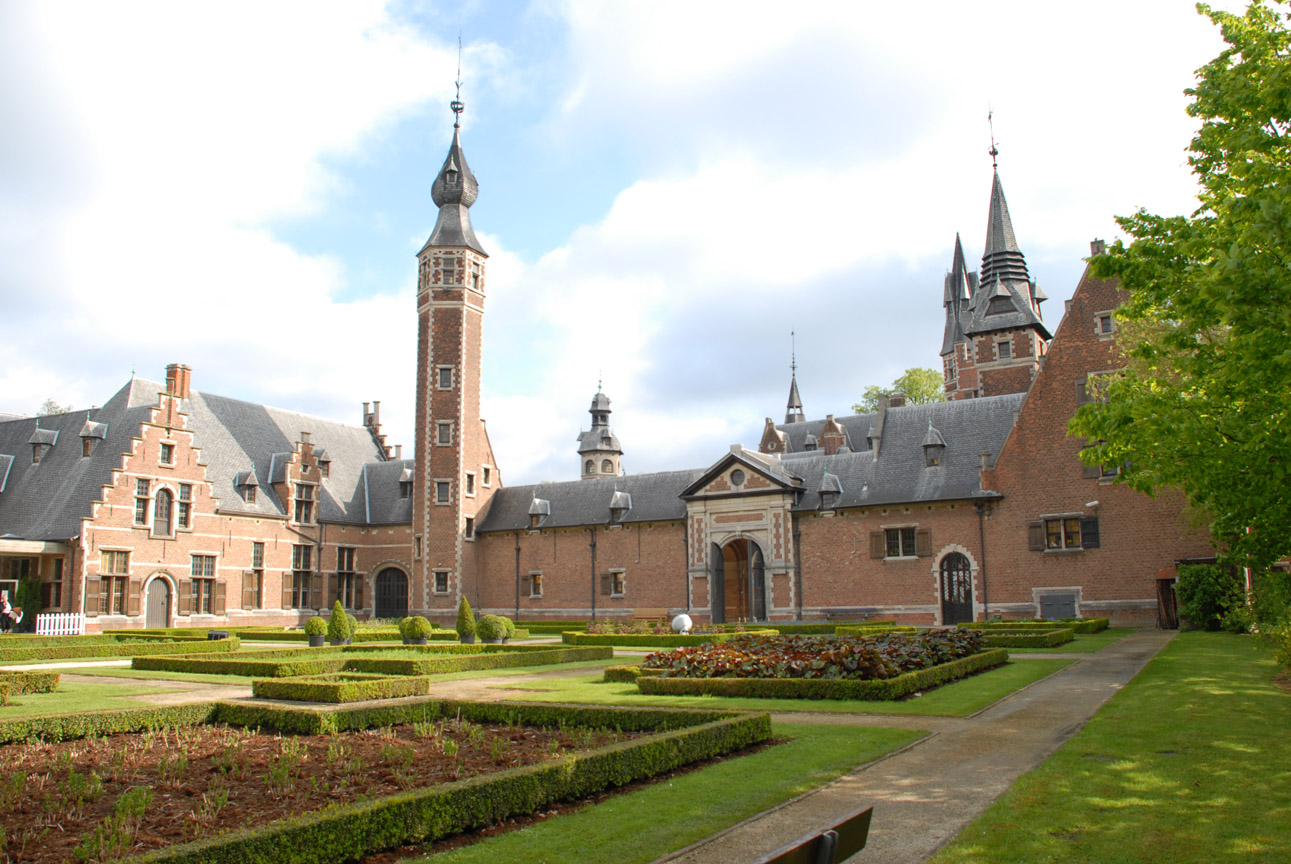
2009

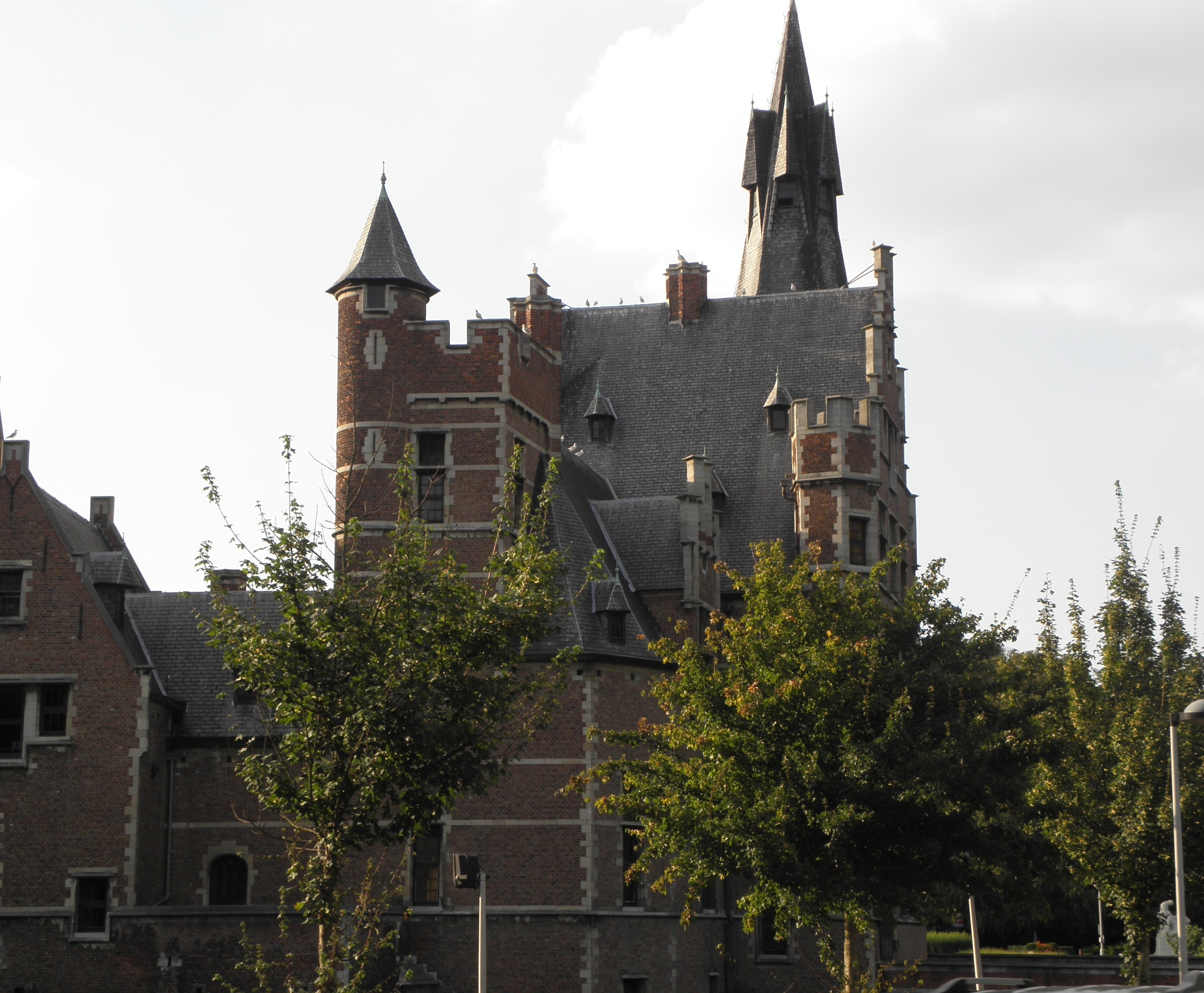
September 2011
