= Van Gheluwe =

Van Gheluwe is a Belgian surname. Notable people with the surname include:

- Guido van Gheluwe (1926–2014), Flemish lawyer
- Peter Van Gheluwe (born 1957), Belgian artist
