= Sint-Gillis-bij-Dendermonde =

- Village
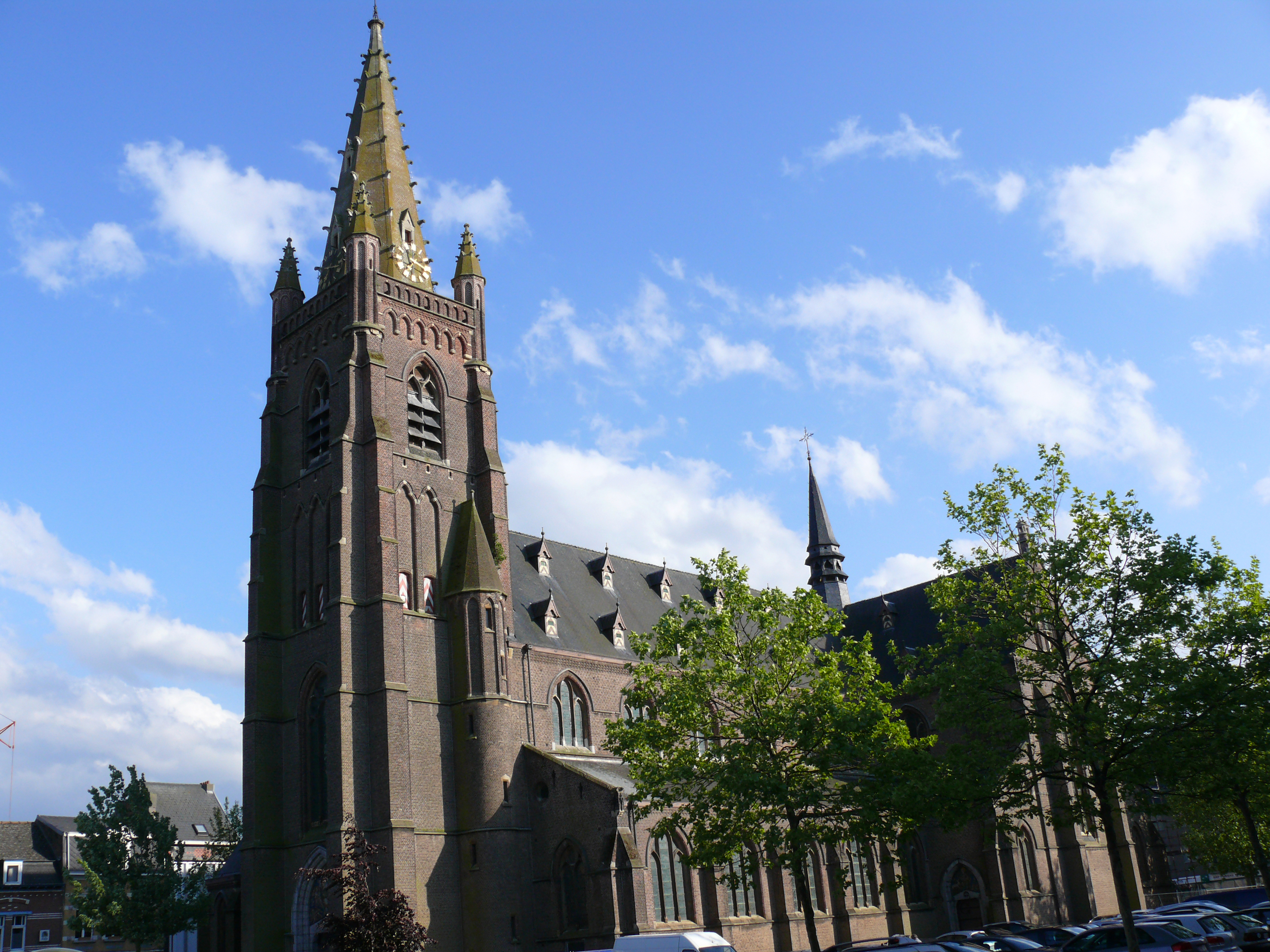
- Saint Egidius church

- Location in Belgium
- Coordinates: 51°01′08″N 4°06′21″E
- Country: Belgium
- Region: Flemish Region
- Province: East Flanders
- Municipality: Dendermonde

Area
  - Total: 10.94 km^{2} (4.22 sq mi)

Population (2021)
  - Total: 12,920
  - Density: 1,181/km^{2} (3,059/sq mi)
- Time zone: CET
- Postal code: 9200

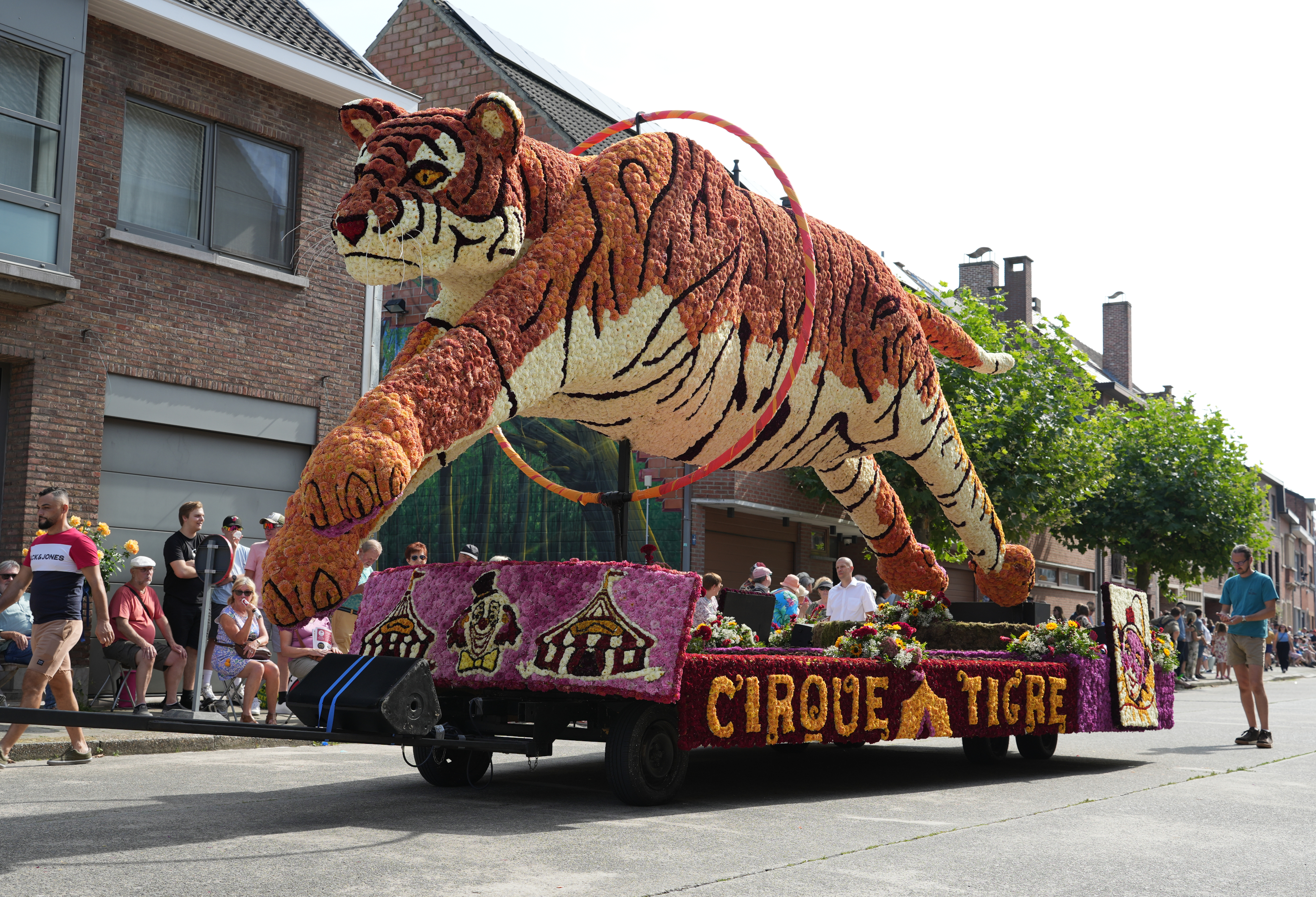
Bloemencorso, 2023

Sint-Gillis-bij-Dendermonde (French: Saint-Gilles-lez-Termonde) is a part of the municipality of Dendermonde in the Denderstreek in East Flanders in Belgium, a typical agricultural village in the Dendervallei near the junction of the railroads to Ghent, Mechelen and Brussels. It was formerly known as Zwijveke.

Sint-Gillis-bij-Dendermonde is birthplace to poet Emmanuel Hiel (1834 - 1894) and literature historian Wies Moens (1898 - 1982).

Every year, on the first Sunday of September, a parade of flower-covered floats, built in the different districts, is held in Sint-Gillis-bij-Dendermonde.

On 23 January 2009, a man attacked a children's daycare centre in the village, killing at least three people and wounding as many as twenty. Italian singer Luciano Ligabue dedicated to the victims a song, Quando mi vieni a prendere? (Dendermonde 23/01/09) inserted in his 2010 album, Arrivederci, Mostro!.

== Places of Interest and Events ==
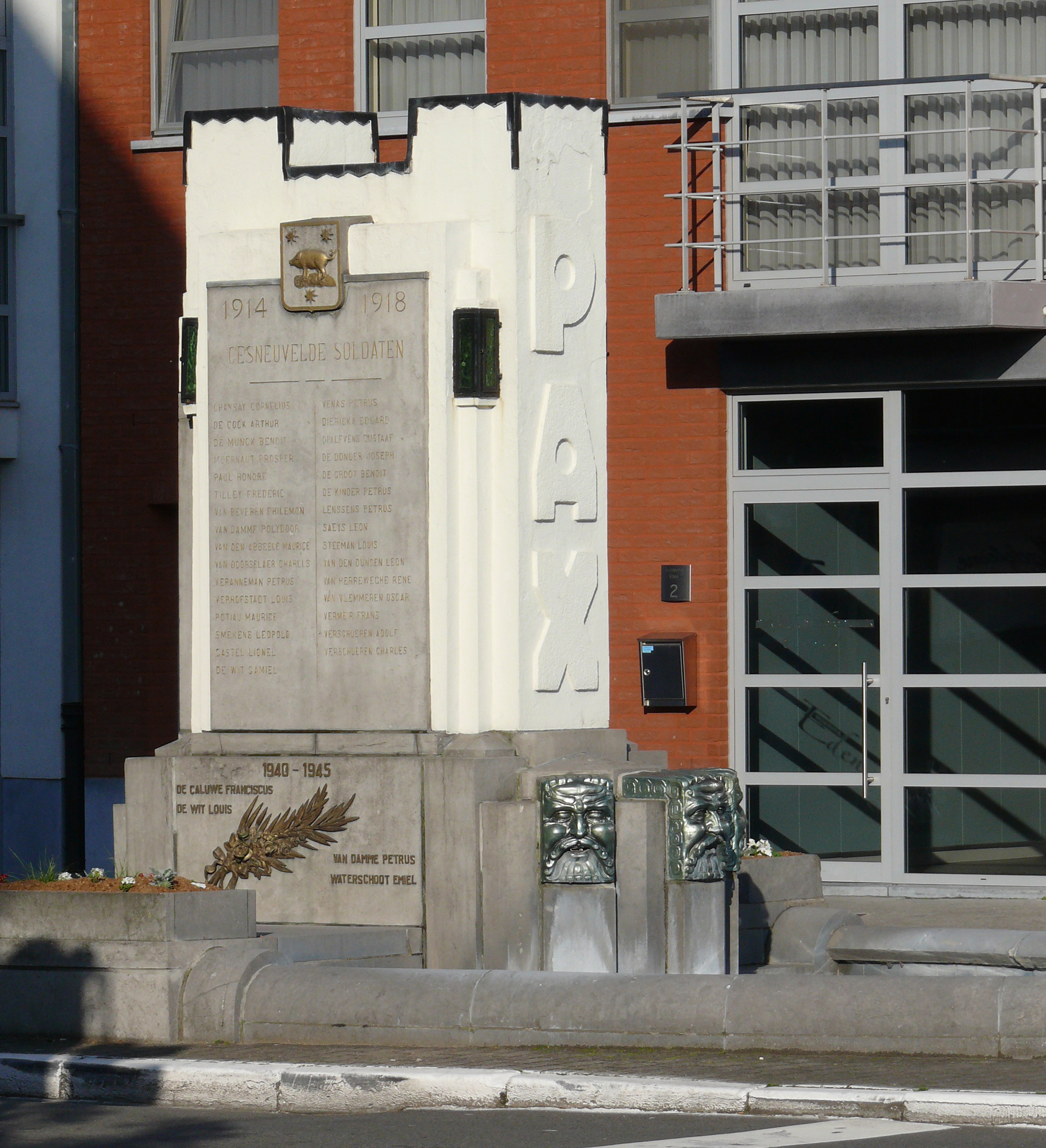
PAX, War memorial

There is one cinema in Sint-Gillis-bij-Dendermonde, named Cinema Albert. It is one of the oldest cinemas in Belgium: it has been in business since 1914 and expanded after the First World War. It has been a family business from the start, and is still run by the same family since 1914. It ranks 36th in the Belgian list of top cinemas.

In 1931, a war monument was erected at Burgemeester Potiaulaan in remembrance of the victims of the First World War. It was designed by Jules Tijtgat, an engineer from Ghent.

Each year in the spring, the Dendermonde Rugby Club organises a rugby cup in Sint-Gillis-bij-Dendermonde.

On the first Sunday of September, a Bloemencorso is organised, a flower parade in which floats, cars and boats are decorated with flowers.
