= Sterckshof silver museum =

Museum in Deurne, Antwerp, Belgium

Zilvermuseum Sterckshof Provincie Antwerpen
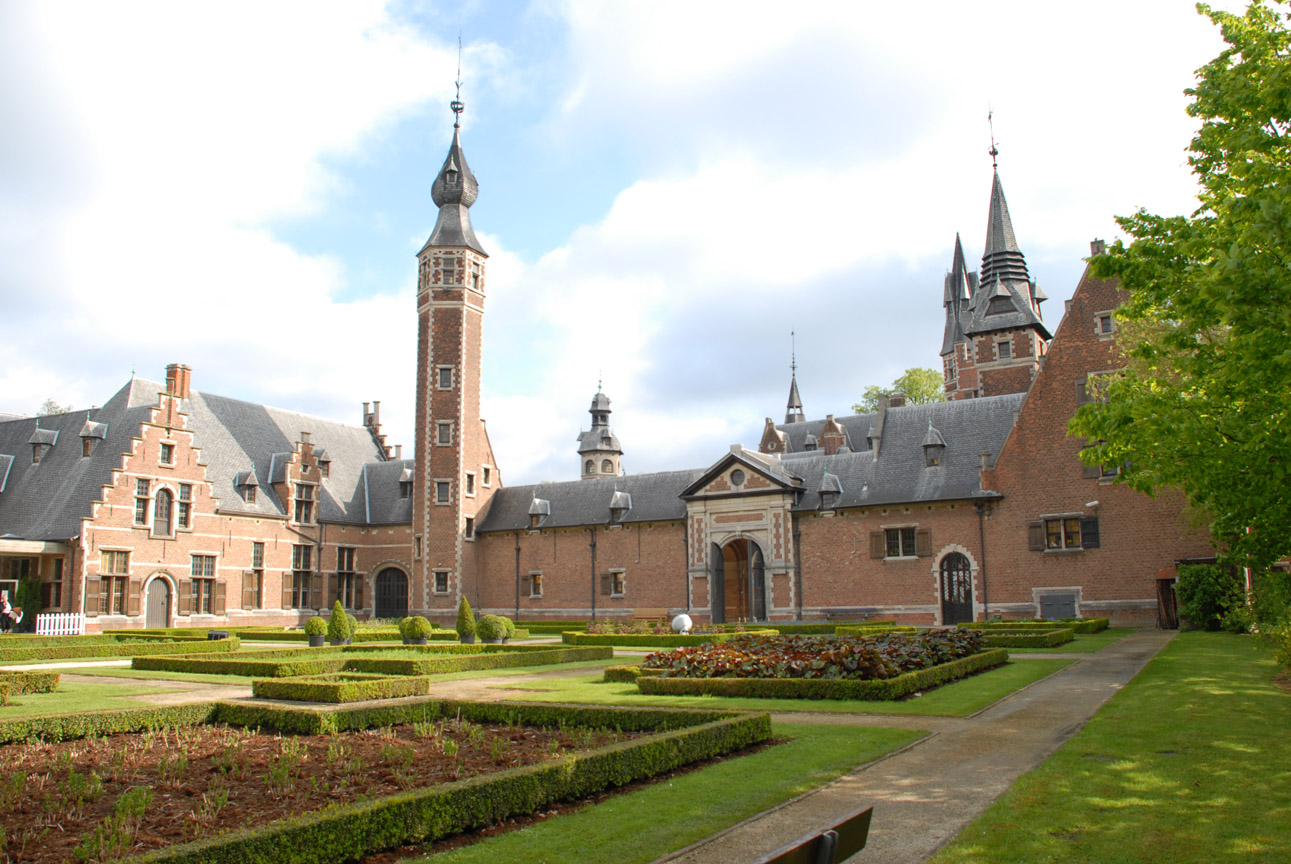

- Location within Belgium
- Established: Museum since 1992
- Dissolved: Merged with the Antwerp Diamond Museum to form DIVA in 2014
- Location: Sterckshof castle in Deurne, Belgium
- Coordinates: 51.214992°N 4.462777°E
- Type: Silversmith
- Curator: Sandra Janssens
- Website: www.zilvermuseum.be

The Sterckshof silver museum of the province of Antwerp (Dutch: Zilvermuseum Sterckshof Provincie Antwerpen, French: Musée de l'Argenterie de Sterckshof) was a museum located in Sterckshof castle in Deurne, Province of Antwerp, Belgium, from 1994 to 2014. It then merged with the Antwerp Diamond Museum to form DIVA Museum for Diamonds, Jewellery and Silver, based in Antwerp city centre.

== Purpose ==
The Sterckshof silver museum was founded as a centre for research, expertise and promotion of the silversmith's trade. In 2007 the museum was the first museum to ever win the art history prize of the 's-Hertogenbosch Art & Antiques Fair.

== Collection ==
Sterckshof castle was built in neo-Flemish Renaissance style, completed in 1938. The silver museum opened in the castle in 1994 after a major renovation. The museum was about 6 kilometres (3.7 mi) from downtown Antwerp. It was located in the Rivierenhof, one of the city's largest parks. The castle where it was based includes courtyards with a wishing well, a French garden and ruins.

The silver collection is extremely varied, covering the period from the 16th century to the present. The artifacts were presented thematically, with techniques, brands, styles and the use of the objects presented in context. The museum displays included domestic and religious artifacts. The museum also included exceptional examples of antique Belgian furniture.

== Other aspects ==
The museum held silver expertise days and silver Sunday. It organized regular discussions, night classes and tours, and geared custom programs on the theme of silver to schools and groups. There was a functioning silversmith's workshop. The library of the Sterckshof Silver Museum held a unique collection with a focus on Belgian goldsmiths.

There was also an extensive collection related to applied arts, as well as descriptions of artifacts, art styles, information about artists, conservation and restoration techniques and specific topics.

From 1996 onwards the Sterckshof Silver Museum of the Province of Antwerp gave an annual contract to a Belgian silversmith to make a silver artifact for the museum's collection. The museum and the selected jeweler agreed on the object to be made, which should be characteristic of the artist's oeuvre. It was manufactured entirely or in part in the museum's silver workshop. The museum would publish a small monograph on the artist.

In September 2010 Sandra Janssens, formerly a scholarly associate at Musea Brugge, replaced acting director Wim Nys as curator.

In 2014 the museum merged with the Antwerp Diamond Museum to form DIVA Museum for Diamonds, Jewellery and Silver, which opened in 2018 near the Grote Markt in Antwerp. Alternative uses have been sought for the Sterckshof site.
