= Peter Van Gheluwe =

Belgian artist (born 1957)

- Born: 6 December 1957 (age 68); Sint-Denijs-Westrem
- Education: Higher Institute of Fine Arts Saint-Lucas
- Known for: Painting, drawing
- Website: petervangheluwe.be

Peter Van Gheluwe (Ghent, 6 December 1957) is a Belgian artist, known for his paintings, drawings and spatial work. Works of Van Gheluwe are part of collections such as those of the Flemish Community, the National Bank of Belgium, Mu.ZEE Ostend and the city of Aalst, along with private collections in Belgium and abroad. He was married twice and has three sons. He currently lives and works in Scheldewindeke.

== Early life and education ==
Peter Van Gheluwe was born in Ghent and was raised as the youngest of nine children and developed an observing eye for his surroundings early on. Around the age of twelve he began capturing the world in his drawings, and he started painting around his 14th birthday. He started an education in drawing and graphics at the Higher Institute of Fine Arts Saint-Lucas. Inspired by a study trip through Europe during the first year of his studies, where he visited many major cities and museums, he continues painting in his studio at home.

== Beginning artist ==
After his studies, Van Gheluwe combines the first years of work as an advertisement painter with his artistic work. In 1982 he is asked to teach at his alma mater, the Higher Institute of Fine Arts Saint-Lucas.

He participates in a series of competitions. In 1978 his first solo exhibition takes place in Galerie Siegfried De Buck and he wins the "Price for Painting" in Poperinge and the "Price for Painting" of the Lions Club Ghent. He also wins the "Price for Graphic Art Ebes" in 1980.

== Career ==
In 1983, Van Gheluwe receives a distinction in the "Jeune Peinture Belge", followed by an exhibition in the Centre for Fine Arts, Brussels. He receives a bronze medal in the Europaprize for painting (Ostend) in 1984. Two years later, he is honored with another distinction in the "Jeune Peinture Belge", again followed by an exhibition in the Centre for Fine Arts, Brussels, together with Wim Delvoye, Dirk Braeckman and others. Many other individual and group exhibitions take place afterwards, in Ghent, Middelburg, Palma de Mallorca, the Sharjah Art Museum in the United Arab Emirates and others.

From the start of his artistic career, Van Gheluwe focusses on the workings of light. That can be seen in the series "Ardens ritme" (1978) and "Staken in landschap" (1979–1983). This is followed up with a more expressive period with monumental blocks presented as still lifes. This leads to primitive boat- and houseshapes, which he begins to craft in 3D iron wire structures. The boat shape takes an increasingly prominent role in his imagery due to the Amoco Cadiz oil spill and the Herald of Free Enterprise disaster. A monumental example of this is shown in the exhibition "Anti-chambre" in Gent, during the Chambres d'amies in 1986, together with Thierry De Cordier. Jan Hoet names both as exceptional submissions in newspaper articles about the exhibition.

He also starts using the same shapes to develop a personal drawing language using iron wire, culminating in an exhibition in Brussels (Ouvrons les ateliers) where a 10 by 4-meter boat made out of hundreds of smaller iron wire boat shapes is displayed.

On the occasion of his laureateship of the Ebes prize for graphical arts, Van Gheluwe is invited to work at the Frans Masereel Centre in Kasterlee. The results are shown multiple times in exhibitions at home and abroad, for example in De Brakke Grond, Amsterdam and in Palma de Mallorca.

From 1992 onwards, Van Gheluwe's work become more contemplative. Large color planes with his typical earth tones, appear on his canvasses, painted in many layers. The images still express strong impressions of light. In 1996 he begins using sheets of lead in three dimensional work. This series of work is shown in the Claeys-Bouüart Castle in Mariakerke, along with the installation "Geworpen", a 4 x 4-meter salt field with iron boats below an iron raster structure.

In 2006, Van Gheluwe creates a self-designed orangery-shaped installation in the Eeklo Academy. Inside the orangery are unused canvasses behind windows that the spectator can open and close. This way, he wanted to raise questions about place, time and perception.

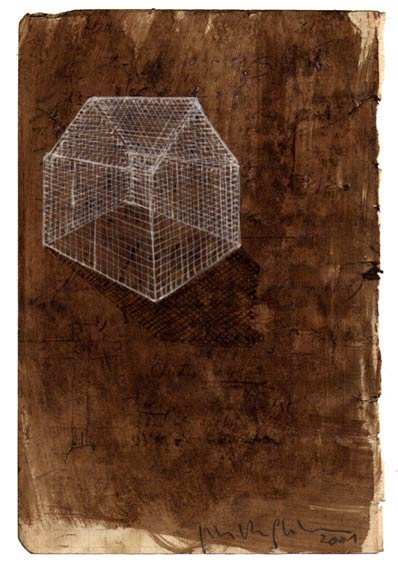
Peter Van Gheluwe, A dialogue, 2001. Mixed media/paper19 x 12.5 cm

Starting in 2003, Peter Van Gheluwe begins digging into his own history. He studied the life of his father, who died when Van Gheluwe was 20 years old and spent years in a labor camp in Germany during World War II. Some drawings about this theme were shown in the exhibition "Zie tekening" in Lier. He continues researching the horror and dehumanization and undertakes a few study trips to concentration camps in Germany and Poland, leading to many drawings, sketches, photographs and film clips. This search leads to the art book "Hidden View" in 2008, with introductory texts by Volkmar Mühleis and Luc Martens and an exhibition in Galerie Negenpuntnegen in Roeselare. Light continues to have a prominent role in these representations of horror.

Van Gheluwe joins the group "Lumen" in 2006, with exhibitions in De Markten, Brussels and De Halle, Geel. He also participates in the art book "Katernen" with an original drawing. This book is exhibited in the Van Abbemuseum in Eindhoven. In between these series he also focuses on how light interacts with water and human tracks on the road.

After 2008, Van Gheluwe turned his focus to the workings of light and its relationship with time and place. Some works from this period were displayed in the exhibition "Stil-Licht", while others were bundled in the book Gnomon with a text by Chris Fite-Wassilac and will be exhibited in Roberto Polo Gallery

== Awards ==
- 1978 – "Hoppeland" prize for painting – Poperinge
- 1979 – Prize for painting – Kuurne
- 1979 – Prize for painting – Lions Club Ghent (honorable mention)
- 1980 – Provincial prize for Graphics – East Flanders (distinction)
- 1982 – Prize for Graphical Arts – Ebes Ghent
- 1983 – Jeune Peinture Belge – Brussels (distinction)
- 1983 – Prize for Painting – Leuven (special mention)
- 1983 – Provincial prize for Painting – East Flanders (distinction)
- 1984 – Europaprize – Ostend (bronze medal)
- 1986 – Jeune Peinture Belge – Brussels (distinction)
