= Wim Goes Architectuur =

Architecture practice

Wim Goes Architectuur is an architecture practice founded by Wim Goes (Ghent, BE) in 1999. Next to his architecture practice, Wim Goes has published drawings and texts on architecture and is teaching at the KU Leuven Faculty of Architecture since 2005. He received his master's degree from Sint-Lucas School of Science & Arts in 1993 and attended the 2006 Glenn Murcutt International Master Class in Australia and the 2008 Master Class in New Zealand with Ian Athfield. He worked on construction sites and in workshops before establishing Wim Goes Architectuur.

== Selected works ==
- 2014: Refuge II, Flanders (BE)
- 2012: Royal Belgian Sailing Club Alberta, Zeebrugge (BE)
- 2010: Idiot Chapel, with artist Kris Martin, Book, White Cube, London (UK)
- 2007: Yohji Yamamoto flagship store, Antwerp (BE)
- 2006: Johann König Gallery, Berlin (DE)
- 2005: Contour, 2nd Biennial of Moving Image, Exhibition design, Mechelen (BE)
- 2004: Jan Hoet Square Ghent, a shared museum square for the M.S.K. (Museum of Fine Arts, Ghent) and the S.M.A.K. (Stedelijk Museum voor Actuele Kunst), First Prize for competition, Ghent (BE)
- 1999: Zich Ophouden Bij, Exhibition design for curator Jan Hoet, Brugge (BE)

== Selected awards ==
- 2016: AR Pop-up Awards, The Architectural Review (GB)
- 2015: Fassa Bortolo International Prize for Sustainable Architecture, University of Ferrara (IT)
- 2013: Belgian Building Awards 2013 (BE)
- 2009: Europe 40 under 40, The European Centre and The Chicago Athenaeum (EU)
- 2007: Agents for Human Interaction, Royal Academy of Arts and WAN (GB)
- 2005: Belgian Prize for Architecture & Energy (BE)
- 2002: Province of East Flanders Architecture Award (BE)

== Publications ==
- 2011 Wim Goes Architectuur, Executive Search, text by prof. Dr. T.L.P Avermaete, TOM publishers, Ghent (BE), ISBN 978-9081570503
- 2010 Idiot Chapel, 2010. Kris Martin & Wim Goes Architectuur, TOM Publishers, Ghent (BE), ISBN 978-0934324458
