= Christian Satin =

Belgian painter (born 1946)

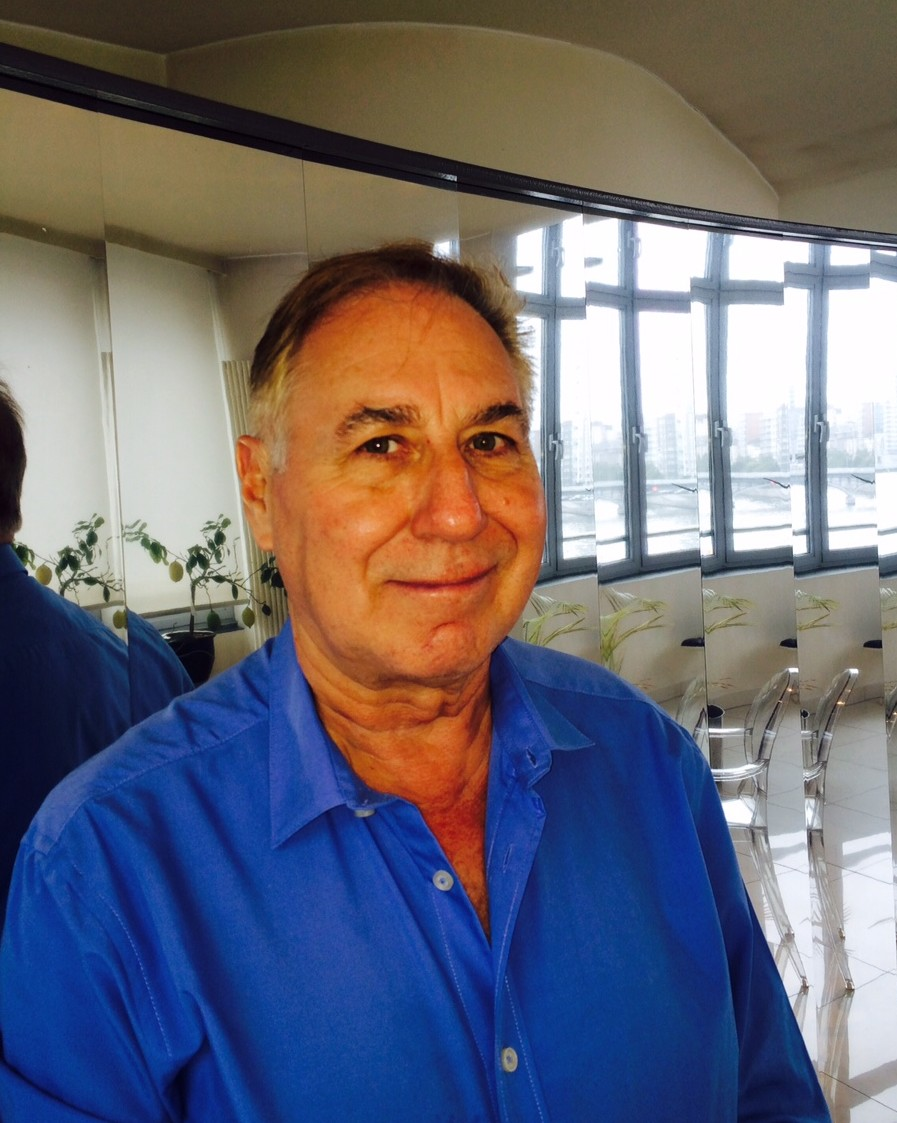
- Christian Satin
- Born: 15 April 1946 (age 79); Brussels, Belgium
- Occupations: Painter, Architect
- Years active: 1966–present
- Children: 1
- Website: http://christiansatin.be/

Christian Satin (born 1946) is a painter born in Brussels. He began painting with oil on canvas at age nine, first borrowing from impressionist techniques, going through a cubist period, before turning towards Surrealism. He started exhibiting and selling his early works as a teenager; this part of his career ended in 1966. His last exhibition was at the Gallery Piranèse together with three other young and upcoming artists. Satin gradually abandoned painting for architecture, partly because of André Breton's death, which seemed to mark the end of the Surrealist movement. He graduated in architecture in 1970 from the Academy of Fine Arts in Liège. After nearly fifty years without touching a paintbrush, Satin rejoined Surrealism in 2012, giving it a new form: Trans-realism.

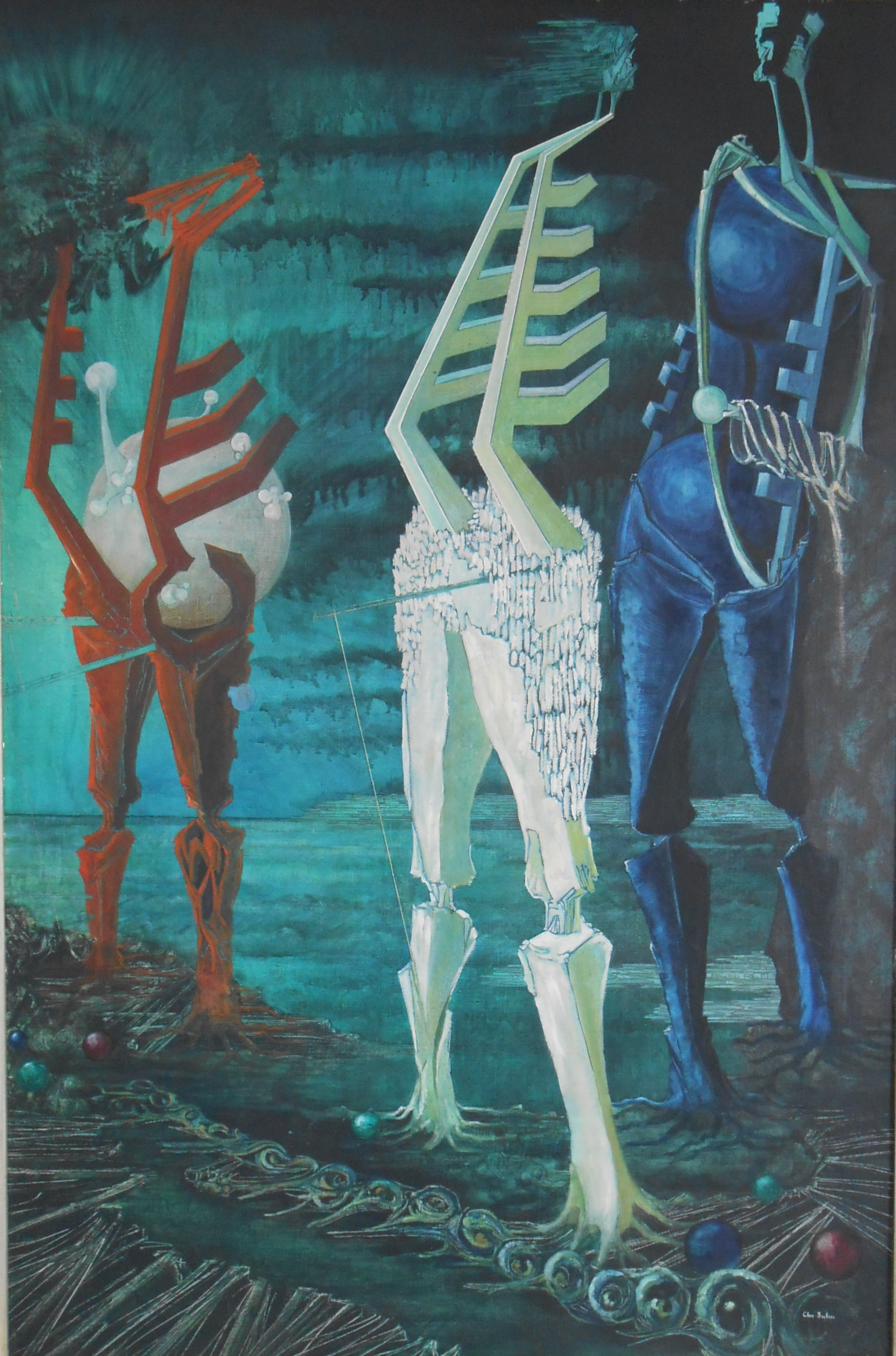
Marcolina (1966–1969)

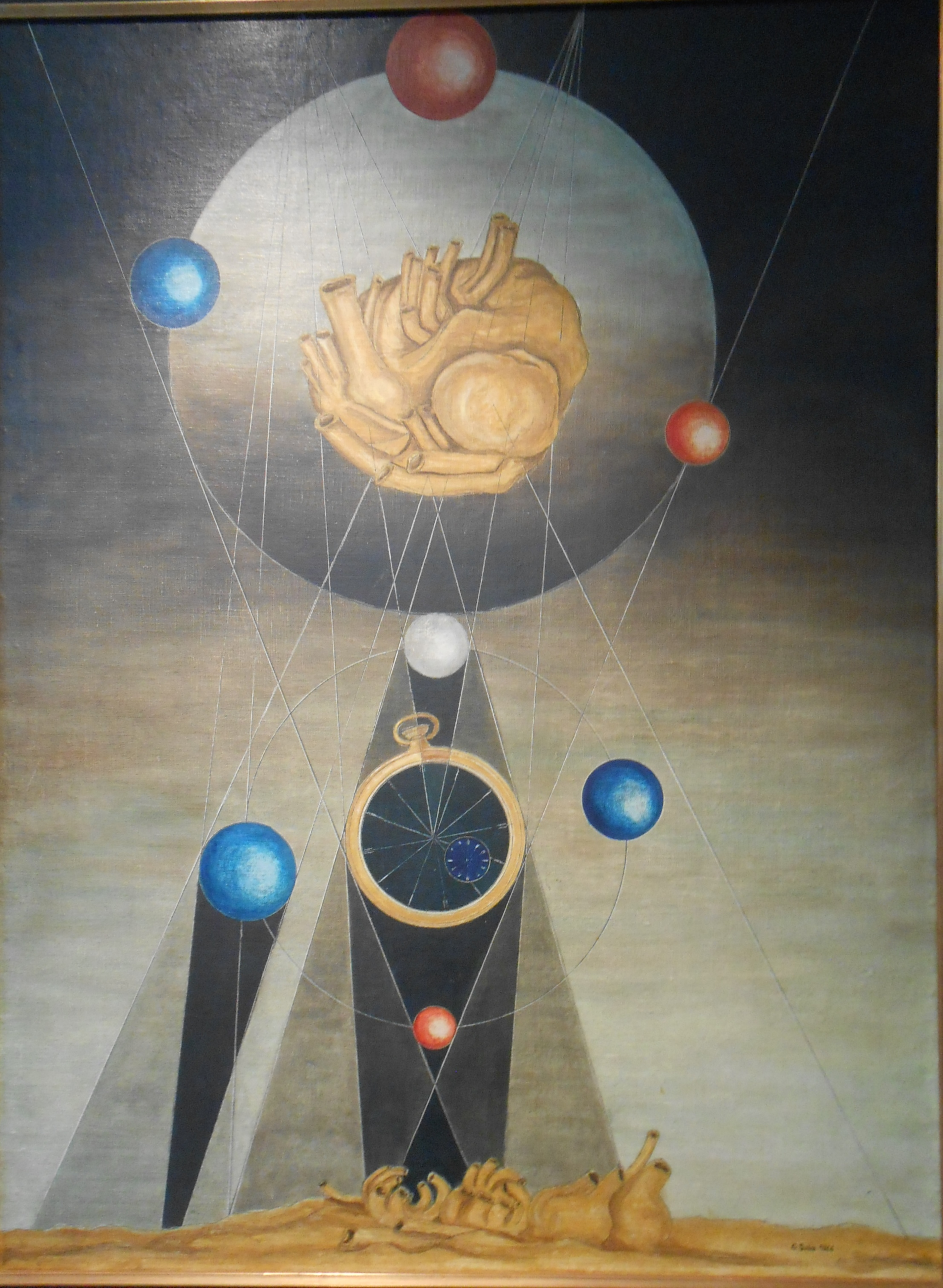
Untitled (ca 1966)

== Trans–realism ==
Trans-realism is the expression of immersive situations and images intended to blur the demarcation line between imagination and reality. Satin paints Trans-realist triptychs in which temporal coherence is interrupted by the insertion of scenes that create another reality. His vision "flows from the current perception of the world at the heart of a universe, where the reality of apparent experience is integrated into space-time; a theatre of apparently chance transformations in the cosmos, and our singular and precarious perception of the quotidian. Similarly, the universe and evolution impose their superior changes onto the potential and imaginative capacity of the brain."

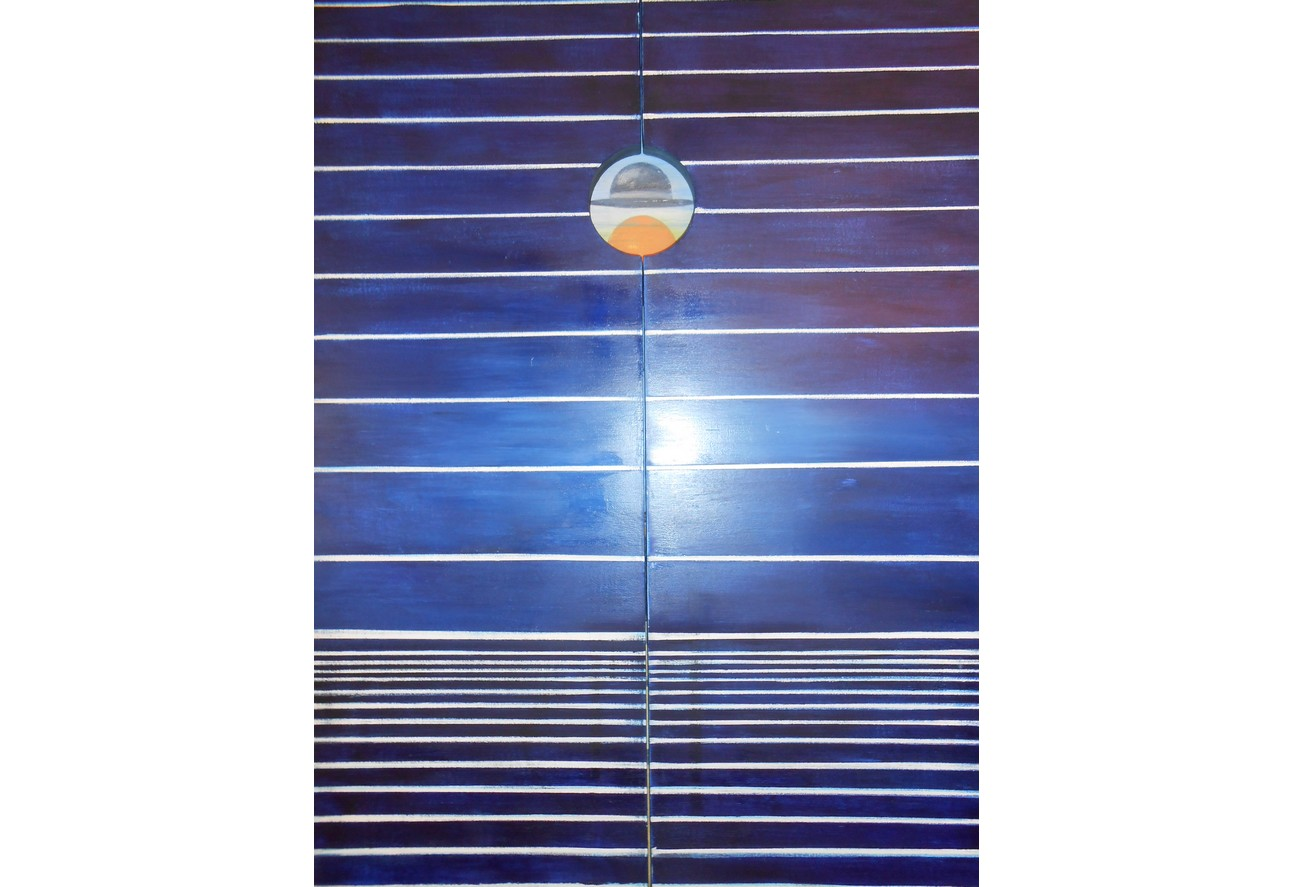
Surrealist Cemetery (Closed triptych)

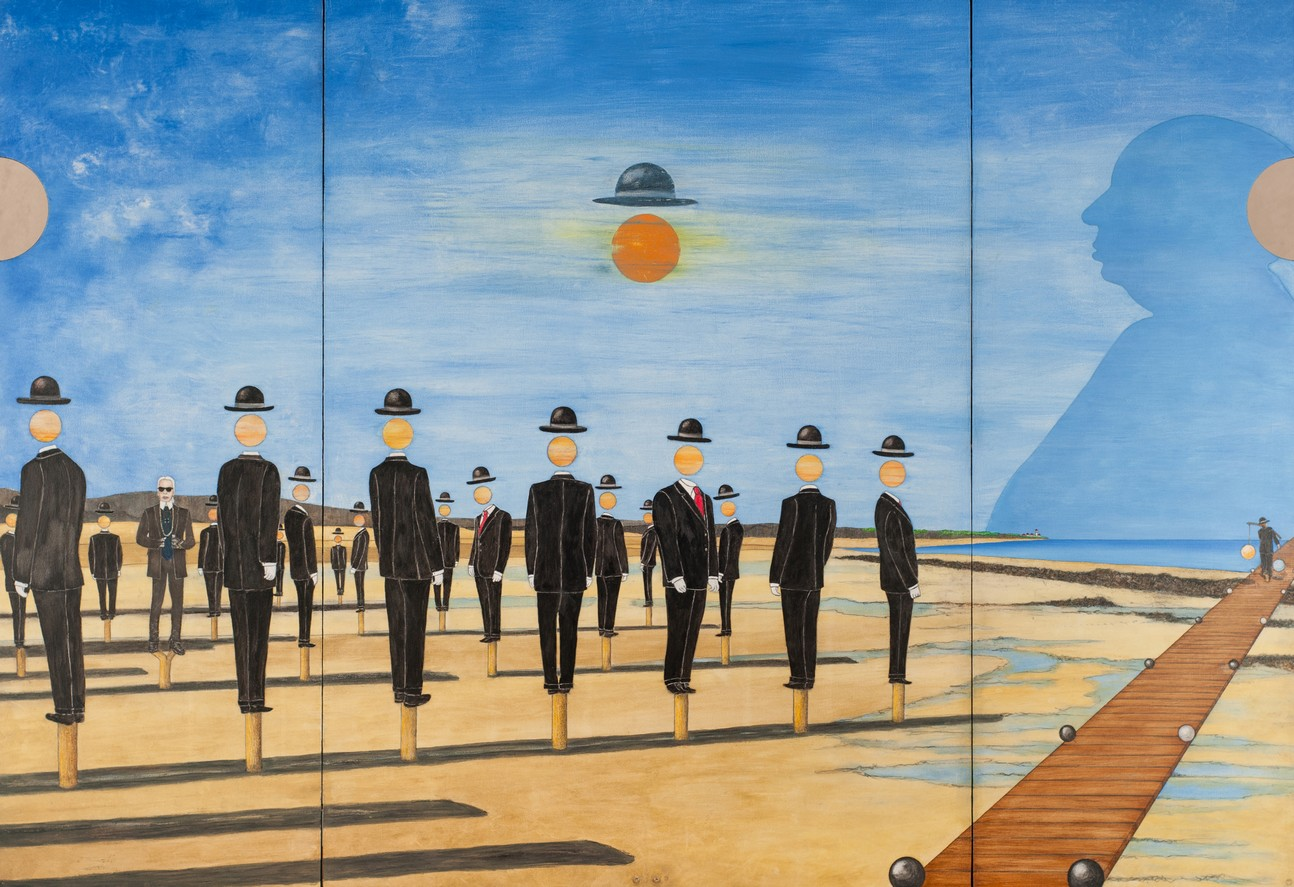
Surrealist Cemetery (Open triptych)

After returning to painting, Christian Satin exhibited his work at the Venta Gallery in Liège in 2014 as well as at the Expo Tempo Gallery in Knokke. The town of Liège and the Wallonia-Brussels Federation set up a major retrospective exhibition at the Grand Curtius Museum entitled: "Christian Satin: Painter and Architect" in March 2015.

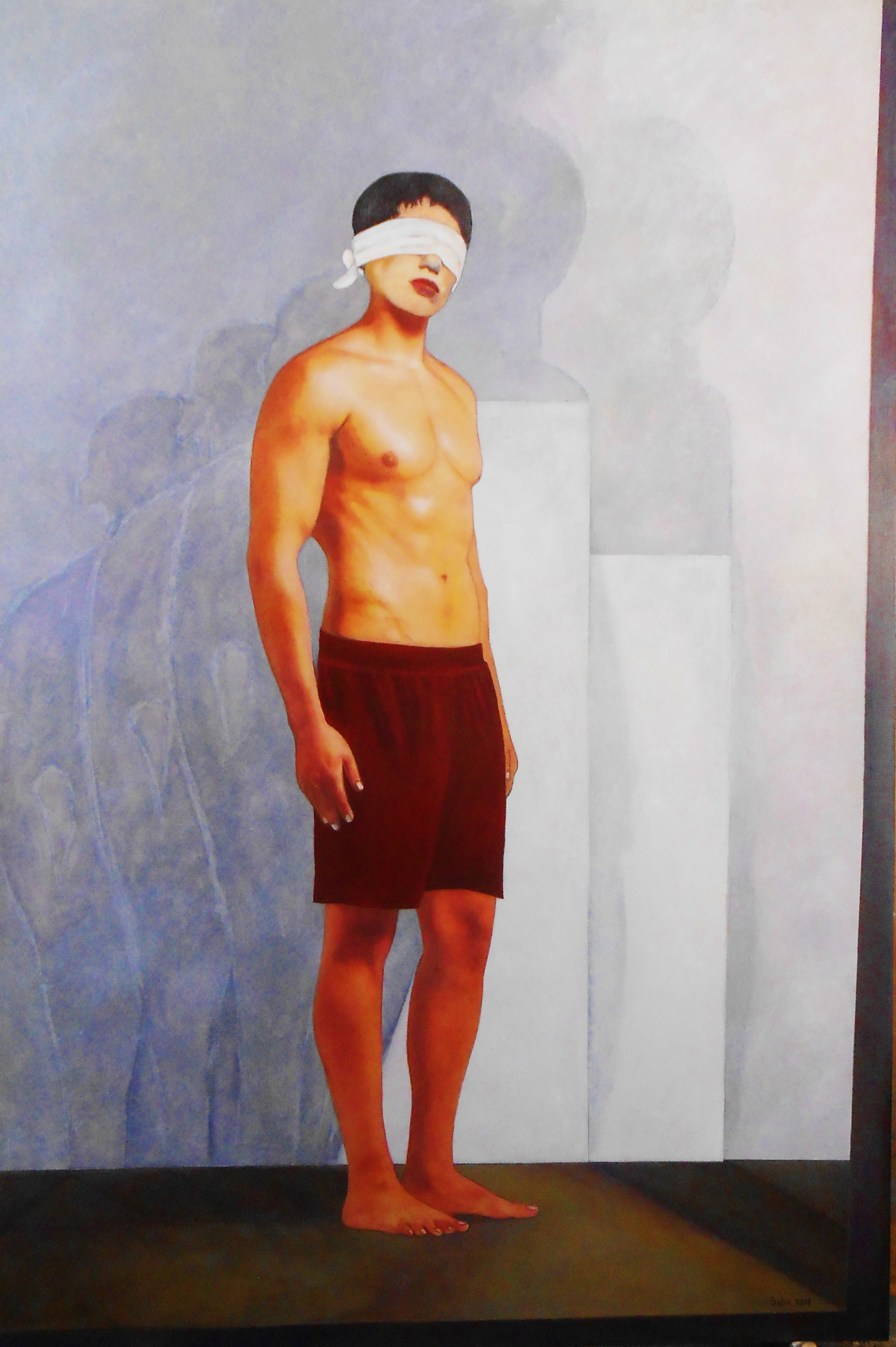
Chronos (2019)

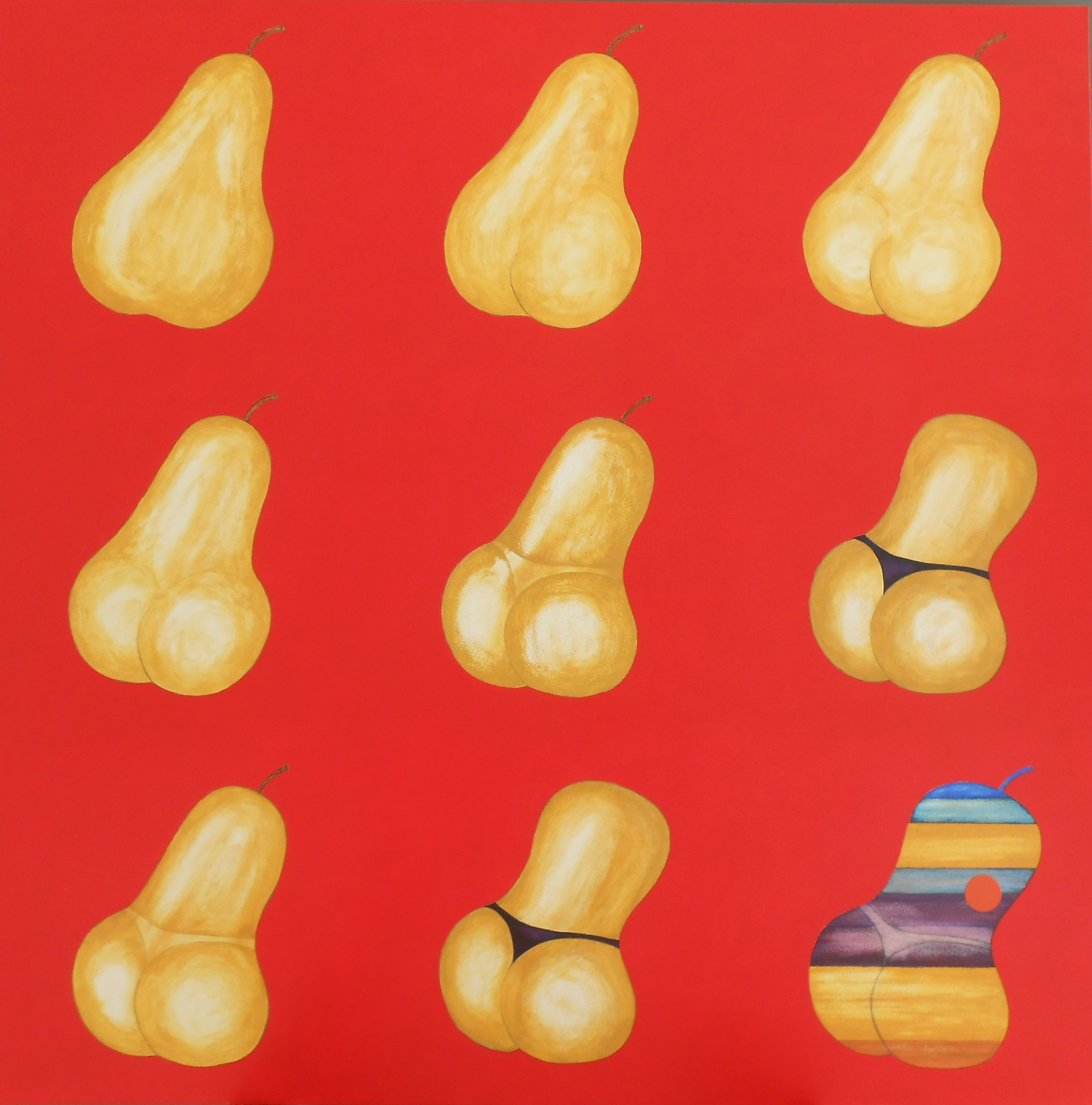
Poires (2016)

== Architecture ==
From the end of the 1960s and for the next forty-five years, Christian Satin was better known as an architect and as a professor. In 1973, he opened his architecture firm, AGE Engineering.

He collaborated in competitions with architects such as Jean Nouvel, Kengo Kuma, Architecture-Studio. He was President of the Liège Provincial Order of Architects and Head of the Walloon Chamber.

One of his accomplishments is Le Vertbois. His use of red paint for the facade was harshly criticised in the press at the time, but the colour has since become a "classic" in Wallonia.

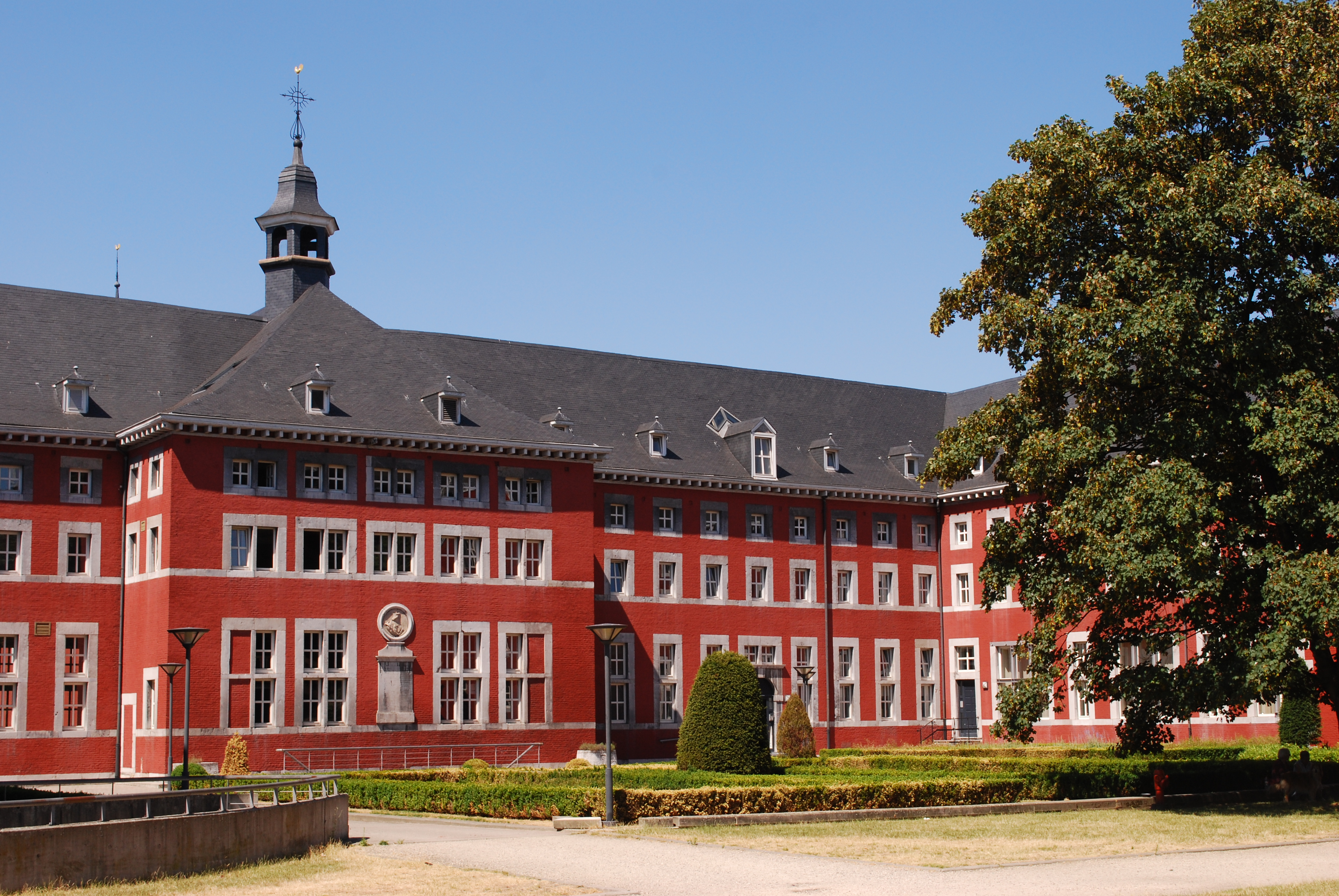
Le Vertbois

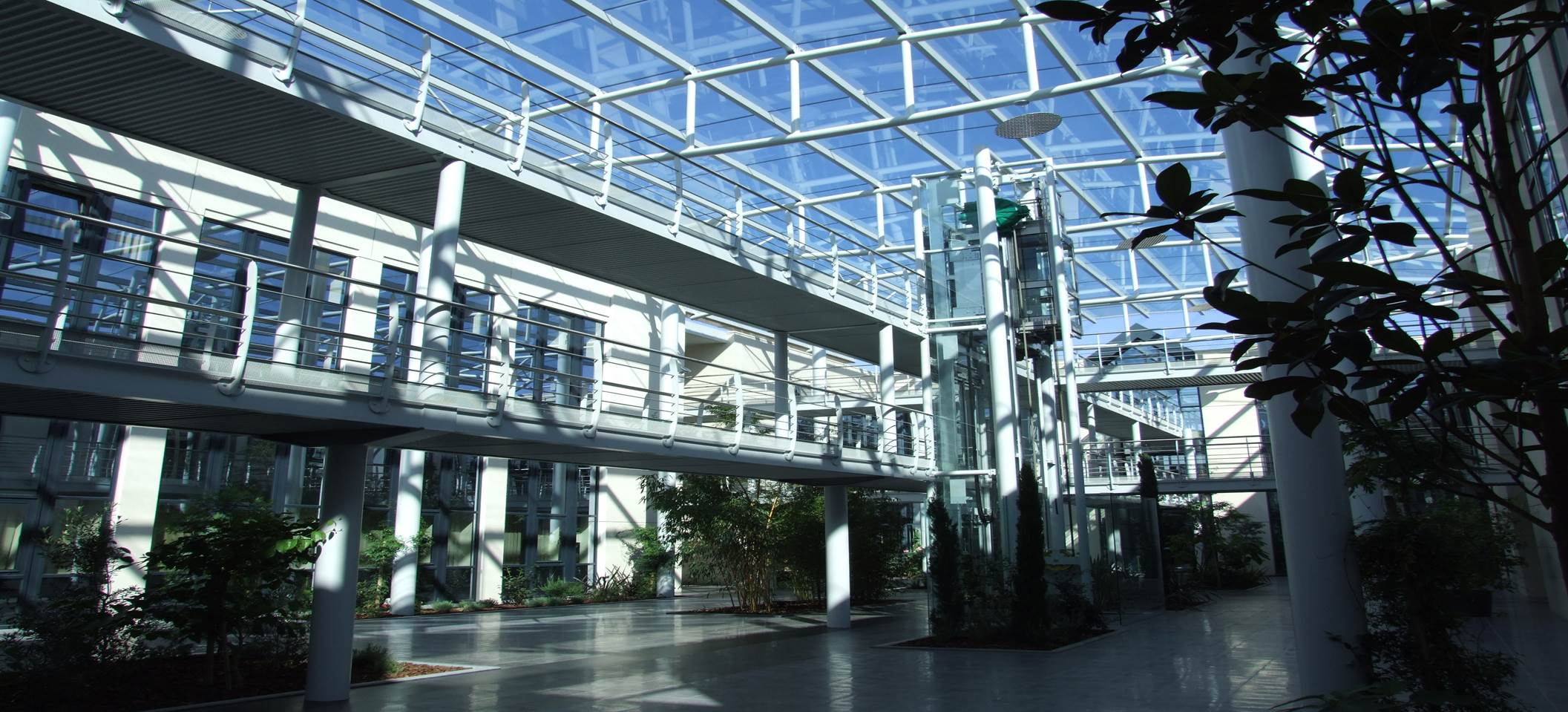
Chaudfontaine office of BAM-GALERE

== Awards ==
Christian Satin was awarded the Urban Planning Prize of Liège in 1991 for the building Maréchal in Rue Cathédrale. In 1996, Satin was awarded the title Knight of the Order of the Crown by His Majesty King Albert II of Belgium. In 2015, Satin received the Bruggenbouwer award from the Institut royal des Élites du Travail, Belgium.
