= François Massau =

François Massau was a Belgian builder and one of the first pioneers of the heliotropic house design. He built his first of three rotating houses in 1958.

== Revolving house ==
Massau built his revolving house in 1958 so that his sick wife, a schoolteacher, could enjoy sunshine and warmth whenever she wanted it. Such buildings were unheard of at the time. The technology that he used at the time was so effective that it still works today and all three revolving houses that he built remain operational. His first revolving house is on a rise above Wavre, with its circular brick and concrete foundation stationary. The steel track on top of this foundation allows the house to revolve with a small electronic motor. The roof is stationary as well. Dominique Quinet, a beautician, currently lives in the home and has her business there. As she said, “It’s the most beautiful house in Wavre. If I worked in the kitchen I simply moved the kitchen to where the sandbox was, so I could keep an eye on her (daughter).” The house moves slowly and makes a full 360 degree turn in 90 minutes.

== Reaction to his houses ==
In 1958, Massau worked to finish his first revolving home before the Brussels World's Fair. He made no money from it, however, and he had to sell the house in 1968 to Ms. Quinet's father, Paul. Paul Quinet then extended loans to Massau so that he could make more revolving houses, which he was unable to sell.

== Death ==
Massau died poor and alone in 2002 in Belgium. His wife and three of his four children died before he did. At least one child, Julien, took his own life.
