= Alphonse Vanden Eynde =

Belgian architect

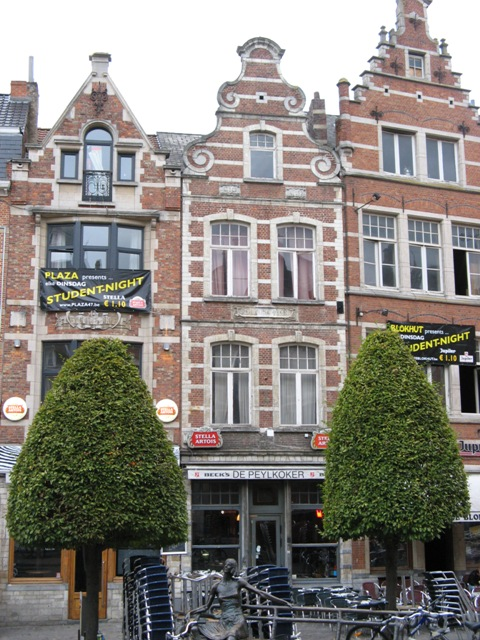
Burgher's House Den Peylkoker, Oude Markt, Leuven, 1918

Alphonse Vanden Eynde (8 April 1884 – 20 October 1951) was a Belgian architect and contractor.

== Biography ==
Alphonse Amedee Vanden Eynde was born in Leuven on 8 April 1884. Vanden Eynde became an architect, as well as a public works contractor and industrialist. He married Joséphine Dantinne. Vanden Eynde died in Heverlee in 1951.

As his career progressed, Vanden Eynde became a delegate at the Ministry of the Reconstruction Recognition Commission, an administrator of the Chamber of Commerce and Industry of the District of Leuven, Chairman of the Public Benefit Commission for the Municipality of Heverlee, Vice-President of Metscel, and a member of the llness and Invalidity Complaints Committee, Ministry of Labor and Social Security.

He was named a Knight of the Order of Leopold II, and awarded a Golden Palms of the Order of the Crown.

=== Work ===
Van den Eynde specialized in the construction of churches, chapels, and convents. After the First World War he took part in the urbanization of Heverlee, a borough of Leuven.

He often collaborated with Joris Helleputte in Leuven, where they were responsible for the construction of many residential buildings in the city center as well as the construction of the People's Bank of Leuven (Dutch: Volksbank van Leuven) on Munstraat.

== Gallery ==
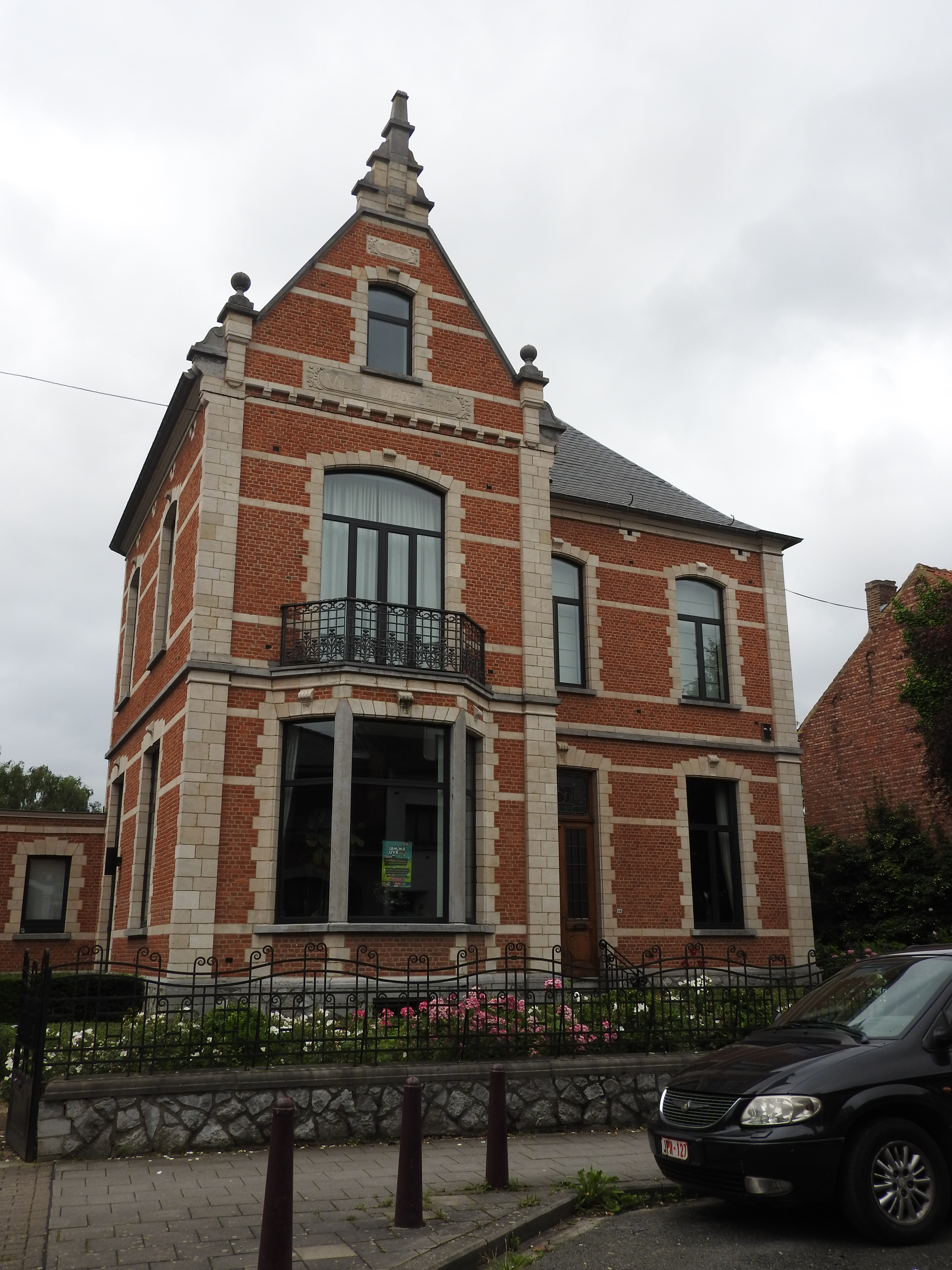
Villa Madeleine, Leo Dartelaan, Heverlee, Leuven, 1918

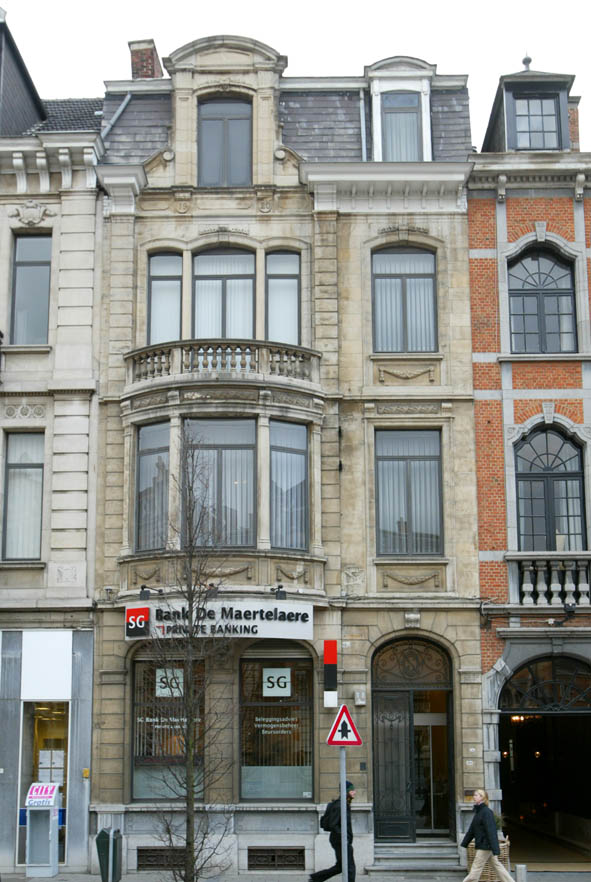
Burgher's House, Bondgenotenlaan, Leuven, 1920

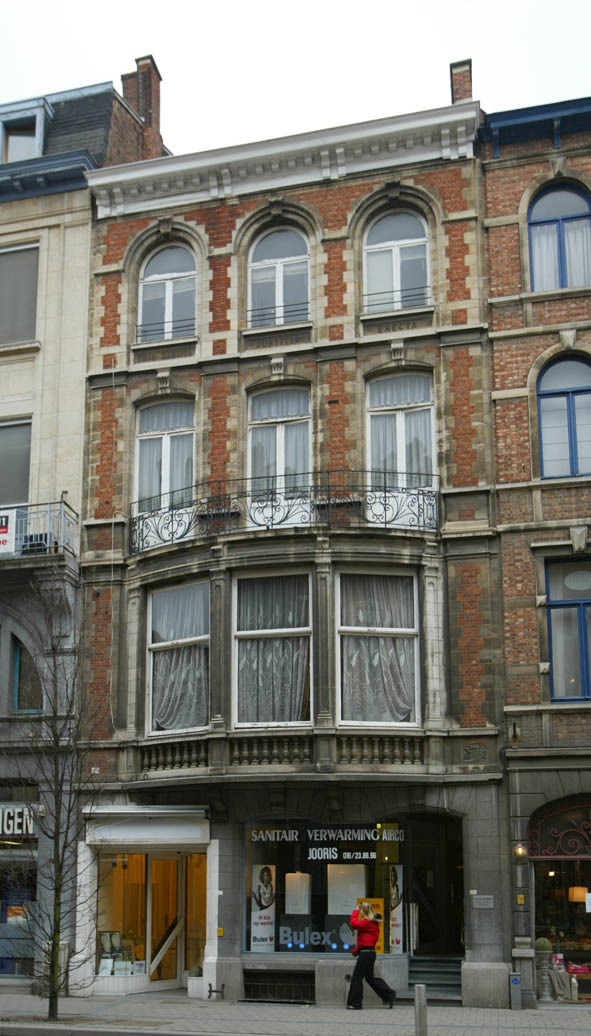
Burgher's House, Bondgenotenlaan, Leuven, 1920

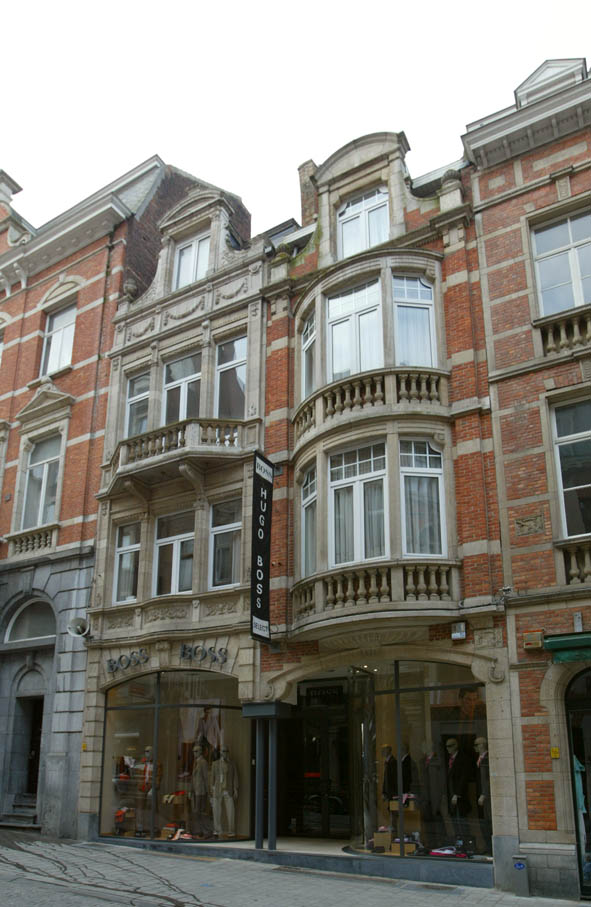
Residential Building, Leopold Vanderkelenstraat, Leuven, 1920

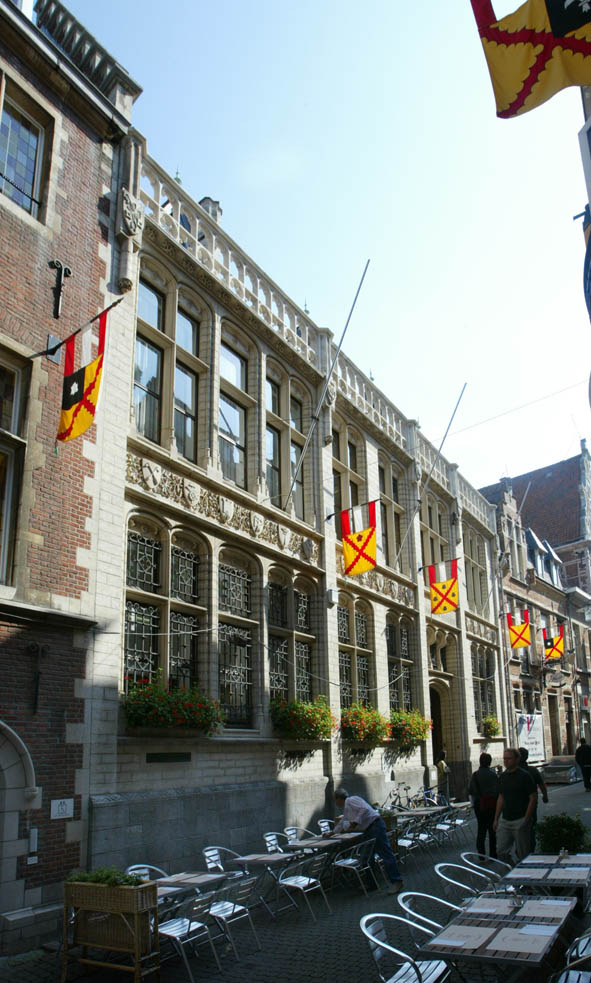
People's Bank of Leuven, Muntstraat, Leuven, 1928
