= DIVA Museum for Diamonds, Jewellery and Silver =

Coordinates: 51°13′16″N 4°23′54″E

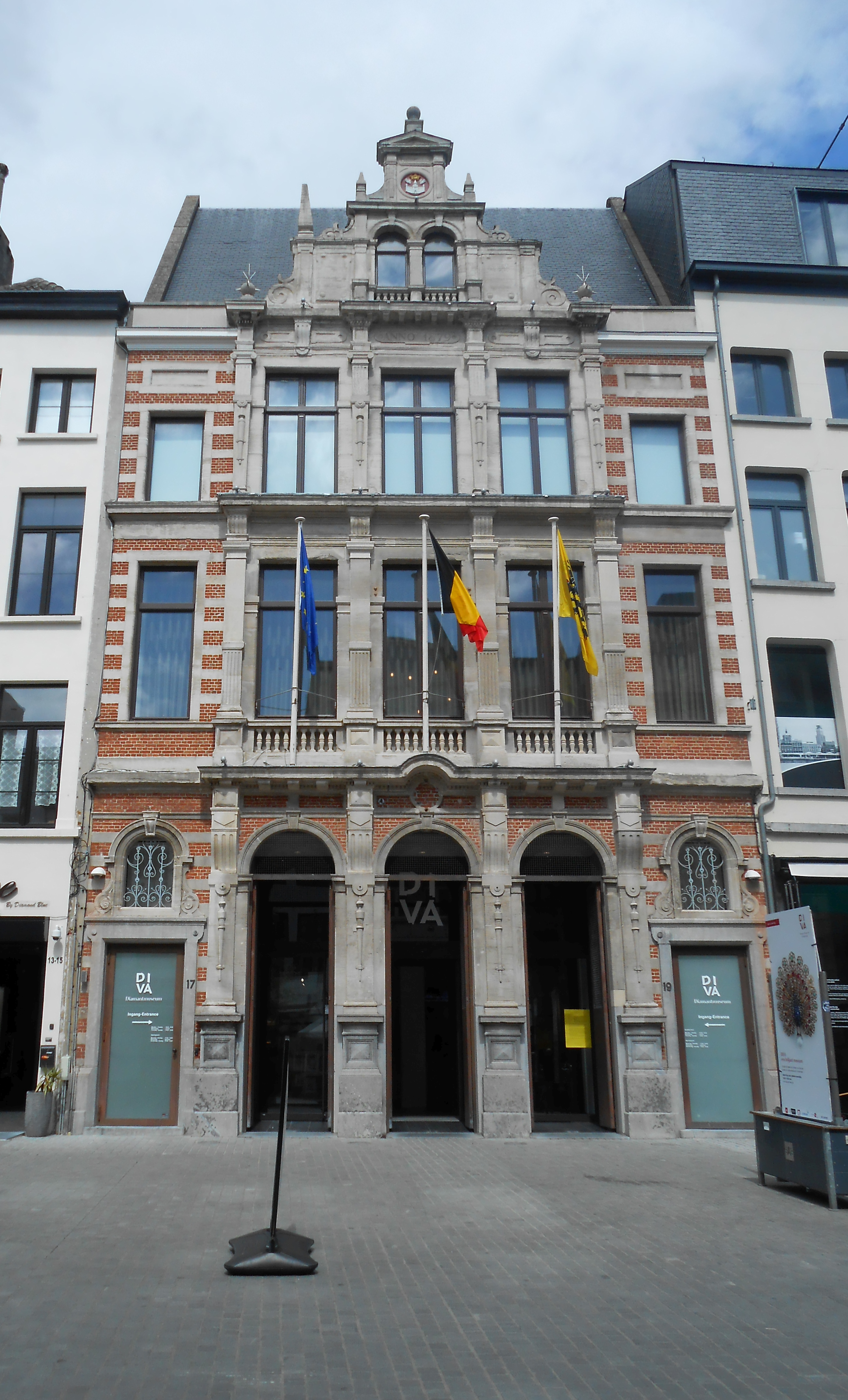
The entrance to the museum, Suikerrui 17–19, Antwerp

DIVA Museum for Diamonds, Jewellery and Silver is a museum that opened in Antwerp, Belgium, in 2018. It merged the collections of the former Antwerp Diamond Museum (1972–2012) and Sterckshof silver museum (1992–2014) in a single institution.

The museum's collection "features over 500 objects that detail the story of Antwerp's history with diamonds and gemstones".
