= Paul Neefs =

Belgian architect

Paul Neefs (4 July 1933 – 7 May 2009) was a Belgian architect and designer of wall objects and free-standing objects.

In 2007, the house he designed for himself in Oud-Turnhout, Belgium in 1965 was provisionally protected, along with those of several other Belgian architects.

== Biography ==
Neefs graduated in 1956 from the Higher Institute for Architecture St. Lucas in Ghent and worked as an independent architect from 1958 to 1983.
