= Deurne, Belgium =

Deurne
- District of Antwerp
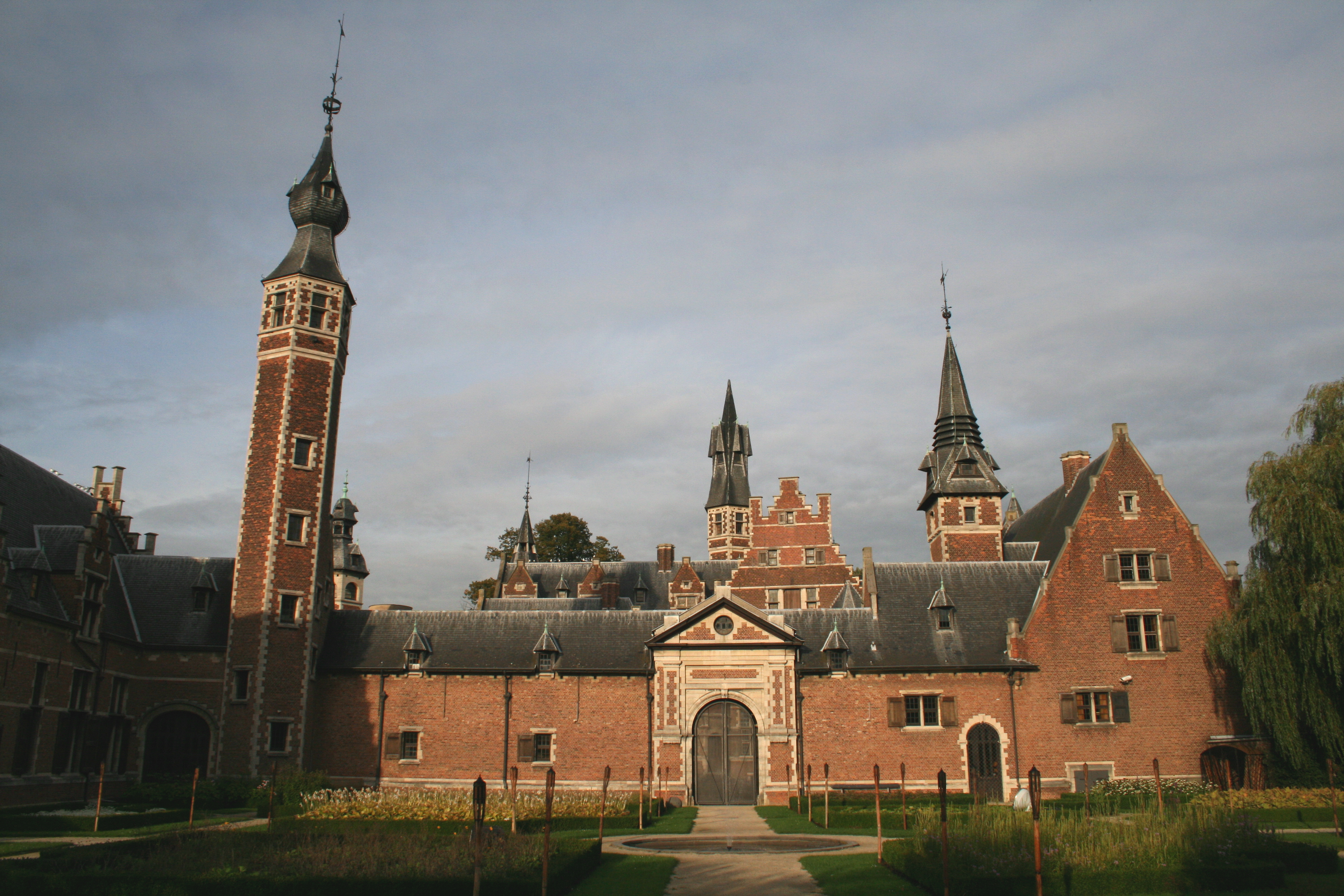
- Sterckshof castle

- Flag Coat of arms
- Interactive map of Deurne
- Location within Belgium Location within Antwerp Province
- Coordinates: 51°13′29″N 4°27′45″E
- Country: Belgium
- Community: Flemish Community
- Region: Flemish Region
- Province: Antwerp
- Arrondissement: Antwerp
- Municipality: Antwerp

Area
  - Total: 13.06 km^{2} (5.04 sq mi)

Population (2025-01-01)
  - Total: 85,283
  - Density: 6,530/km^{2} (16,910/sq mi)
- Postal codes: 2100
- Area codes: 03

Deurne (Dutch pronunciation: [ˈdøːrnə]) is the second largest district of the municipality of Antwerp, Belgium, (right after the Antwerp town district) and has 85,283 inhabitants (2025).

It was a separate municipality until 1983. On 1 January 1983, it was absorbed into the municipality of Greater Antwerp whereby Deurne became one of the 9 districts.

Deurne is best known for its green environment with the biggest park in Antwerp Rivierenhof.

== History ==
=== Ancien régime ===
Deurne was said to be the place where the Irish missionary Fredigand was abbot of Kerkelodor Abbey in the eighth century. There are indications that Deurne existed in prehistoric and Roman times but the first tangible proof of Deurne only dates back to 1185. During the Ancien régime Deurne was nothing more than part of the Eastern hinterland of Antwerp. Like many dwellings it settled on the crossroads of a river (the Schijn) and a connection route (the 'Turnhoutse baan': the road from Antwerp to Turnhout).

Deurne consisted mainly of sparsely populated farmland. However, as a direct result of the increasing wealth of the Antwerp population, many aristocratic estates were erected (the so-called "Hof van Plaisantie" was a specific rural estate, a bourgeois version of a château or country house). Typically, merchants, diplomats, wealthy artists (like Peter Paul Rubens f.i.) would escape to their Hof van Plaisantie. Some country houses in Deurne were : Sterckshof, Papenhof, Lakbors, Bisschoppenhof, Gallifort, Inkborsch, Bosuil, Ertbrugge & Venneborg. Although most country houses were destroyed over the centuries (especially in 1542), some like Sterckxhof or Bisschoppenhof survived. Further surviving evidence of this aristocratic history of Deurne is the St Fredegand Church and the adjacent cemetery (the St-Fredegandusbegraafpark).

=== Nineteenth century ===
After the battle of Waterloo William of Orange started to connect the Antwerp port with its hinterland through the construction of a series of canals between Antwerp and Liège, connecting the Scheldt with the Maas. The work, started under his reign in 1823, was completed in 1874.

The effect of this canal was to establish a permanent barrier north of Deurne (where the Kleine Schijn used to flow), separating it from Merksem. In the south the Grote Schijn would form the south barrier of Deurne. The effect of both barriers was to enhance an 'island feeling' for Deurne. This was further promoted by the establishment of the Brialmont fortifications around Antwerp. Deurne was split apart and the western part of Deurne (Borgerhout) was to become a separate municipality. The rest of Deurne now lay outside the enceinte and became physically and mentally more separated from Antwerp.

=== Modern times ===
Because of the barriers constructed in the nineteenth century, urbanization would only begin in the twentieth century. Many large scale urban functions were 'dropped' in the undestined area previously occupied by the Brialmont-fortifications (like the event hall Sportpaleis Merksem). Urban planning started in 1913 and although the original plan was never fully realised it did determine the spatial structure of Deurne.

A real demographic explosion happened because of this urban planning and the need for many Antwerp residents to find modern housing. The population grew from 15,432 in 1920 to 52,303 in 1935.

World War II halted this evolution, mainly because of the V-2 bombardments. After 1945 the growth of Deurne started again and in the 1960s social housing & other community projects further enhanced this new urban identity of Deurne.

From 1972, onward Deurne was subject to the urban exodus and the urban sprawl whereby people moved from the dense urban centres towards the suburbs. As a result, the population began to diminish in numbers and the remaining population became older.

In 1983, Deurne was absorbed into the municipality of Greater Antwerp (see : Antwerp) whereby Deurne became one of the 9 districts. In 2001, Antwerp was decentralised, Deurne once again has its own elected council, not a city council but a district council, not a mayor but a 'chairman of the district governing board'.

== Major attractions ==
Deurne has one of the oldest still functioning airports in the world, established in 1923. Antwerp Airport is a regional airport with only a limited number of flights a day. Located at the airport is the Stampe & Vertongen Museum, at the location of the old aircraft production company of the same name.

== Politics ==
=== District college ===
The members of the district college between Januari 1, 2019 and 31 December 2024 are:

District college
Districts chairman	Tjerk Sekeris (N-VA)
District aldermen	1. Elke Brydenbach (N-VA); 2. Philip Van Acker (N-VA); 3. Frank Vercammen (SP.A); 4. Freddy Lorent (Open Vld)

=== District council ===
The district council of Deurne has a total of 29 seats. De district council chairman is Frank Geudens (SP.A).

== Notable people ==
- Erik Van Looy, film director and TV quiz presenter
- An Pierlé, musician
- Björn Leukemans, cyclist
- Pascal Struijk, footballer (born 1999)
- Peter Renkens, Belgian singer, frontman of Confetti's
- Raymond Van Dijck, a Belgian pole vaulter, participated in the 1960 Olympics Games

== Economy ==
VLM Airlines has its head office on the grounds of Antwerp International Airport in Deurne; the office is also CityJet's Antwerp office.
