= Sint-Lucas School of Architecture =

Architecture school in Belgium

Coordinates: 50.8584°N 4.3683°E

Catholic University of Leuven, Faculty of Architecture, Campus Sint-Lucas Brussels/Ghent
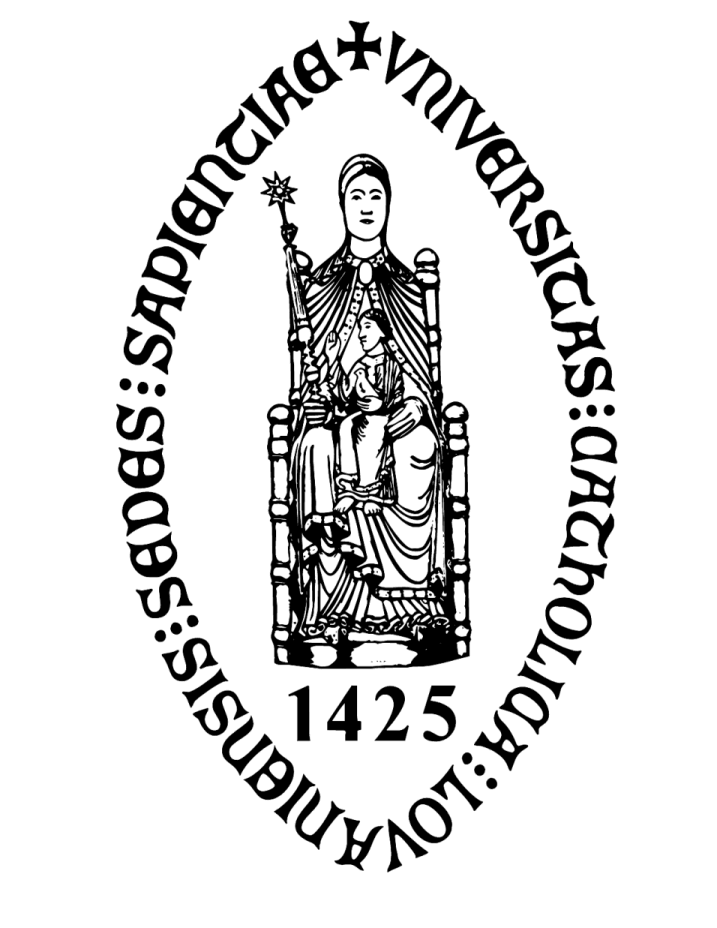
- Type: Independent University
- Established: 1862
- Dean: Dag Boutsen
- Students: 2000 (approx.)
- Location: Brussels and Ghent, Belgium
- Website: http://arch.kuleuven.be

KU Leuven Faculty of Architecture (formerly known as the Sint-Lucas School of Architecture) is a Belgian school of architecture established in 1862 with campuses in Brussels and Ghent.

== History ==
Sint-Lucas School of Architecture was founded in 1862 in Ghent and in 1887 in Brussels. It is the oldest free architecture institute in Belgium. Since 1995 the department has been part of the School of Science & Arts (Hogeschool voor Wetenschap en Kunst). The latter became a partner in the Association KU Leuven in 2002.

In 2013, the department of architecture left the school, which had become the LUCA School of Arts, to join the Katholieke Universiteit te Leuven, creating the "KU Leuven, Faculty of Architecture".

== Facilities ==
KU Leuven, Faculty of Architecture has two campuses: one in Brussels and one in Ghent. The renovation of the former building in the Brussels campus received the award for the redevelopment of a valuable old building.

In Ghent, the design studios are organized in the Dominican Abbey Kane. The Commission on Monuments and Sites nominated the restoration project of this Abbey (2002) for the memorial prize.
