= List of French architects =

The following is a chronological list of French architects. Some of their major architectural works are listed after each name.

== Middle Ages ==
Étienne de Bonneuil (late 13th century)

- Uppsala Cathedral, Sweden

Jean de Chelles (13th century)

- Notre Dame de Paris

Pierre de Montreuil (c. 1200–1266)

- Notre Dame de Paris
- the Abbey of Saint-Germain-des-Prés
- Saint Denis Basilica

Matthias of Arras (?–1352)

- Saint Vitus Cathedral in Prague

Villard de Honnecourt (14th century) – architecture plans

Pierre d'Angicourt (late 13th century)

- Lucera castle

Pierre de Chaule (late 13th century)

- Castel Nuovo

== Renaissance to Revolution ==
Jacques I Androuet du Cerceau (c. 1510 – c. 1585)

- Important book of architectural engravings

Philibert Delorme (or De L'Orme) (1510/1515–1570)

- Chateau d'Anet (c. 1550) – for Diane de Poitiers
- Tuileries Palace (1564–1567)

Pierre Lescot (1515–1578)

- Louvre Palace (Lescot Wing, 1546) – for Francis I and Henry II
- Hôtel Carnavalet (attributed, begun 1547)
- Fontaine des Innocents (1550) – carved by Jean Goujon

Jean Baptiste Androuet du Cerceau (c. 1545–1590)

- Pont Neuf (1599) – for Henry IV

Jacques Androuet II du Cerceau (c. 1550–1614)

- Grande Galerie du Louvre
- Pavillon de Flore (Tuileries)

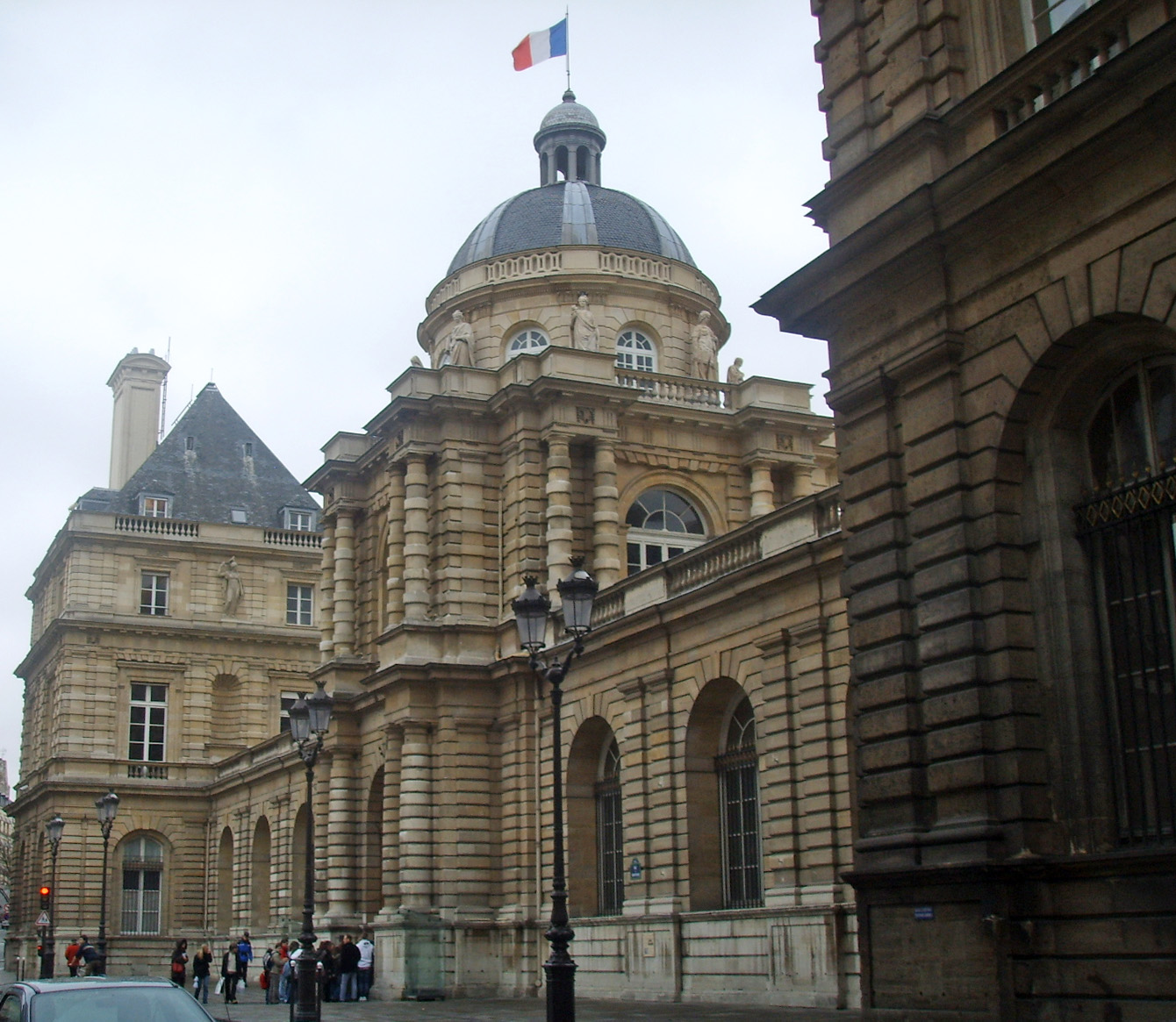
Luxembourg Palace by de Brosse

Salomon de Brosse (1575–1626)

- Luxembourg Palace (1615) – for Marie de' Medici
- St. Gervais church (facade) (1616)
- Château de Blérancourt
- Palais de Justice in Rennes (1618)

Jean Androuet du Cerceau (1585–1649)

- Hôtel de Sully (1624–1629)

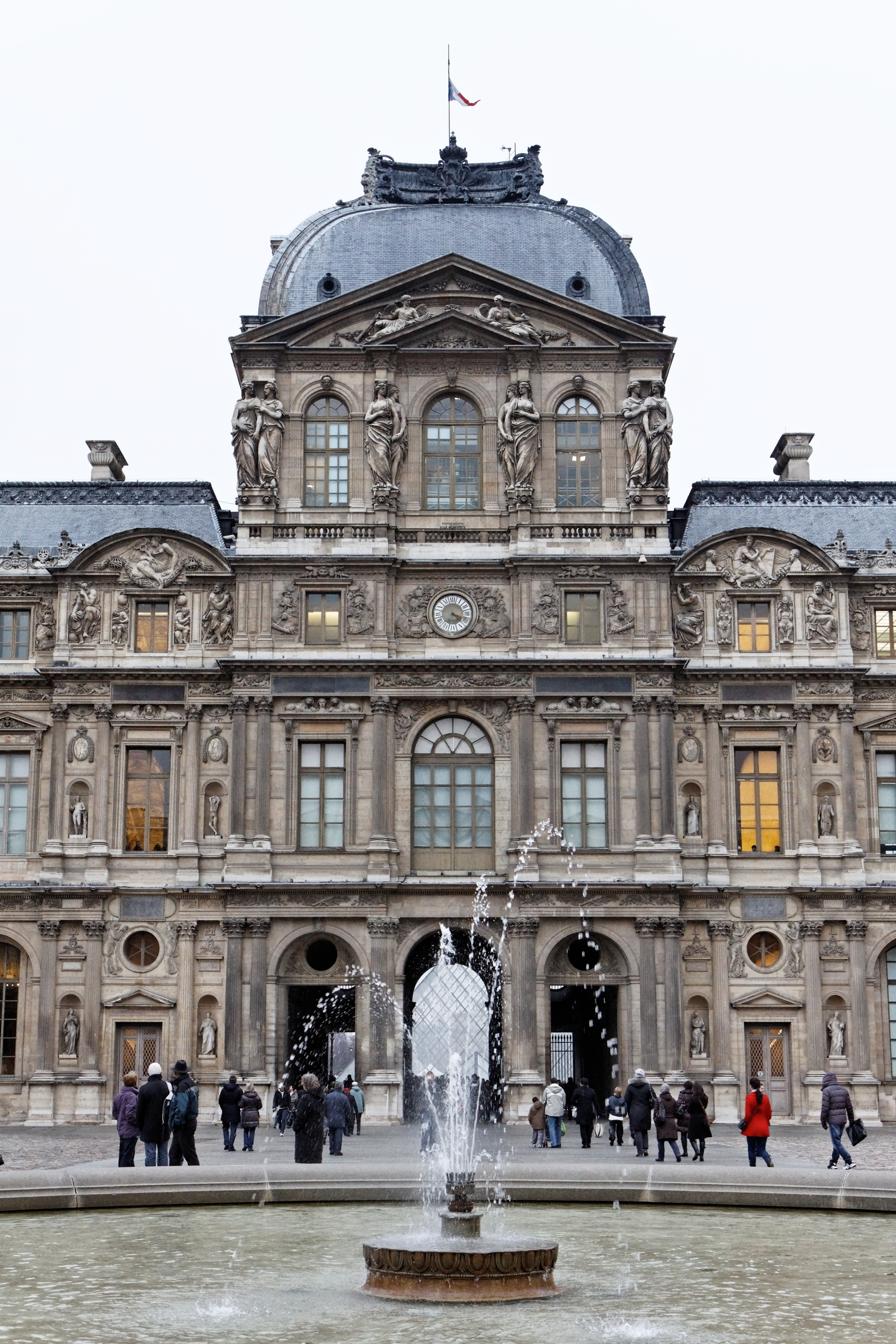
Lemercier's Pavillon de l'Horloge at the Louvre

Jacques Lemercier (1585–1654) – active for Richelieu

- Palais-Cardinal (1632) – for Richelieu
- Château de Richelieu
- City of Richelieu (from 1631)
- La Sorbonne church (1635) – for Richelieu
- Pavillon de l'Horloge (Louvre)
- St. Roch church
- Abbaye du Val-de-Grâce (1646–1653, further construction)

François Mansart (1598–1666)

- Château de Blois (1635–1638)
- Abbaye du Val-de-Grâce (1643–1646, plans and initial construction) – for Anne d'Autriche (Anne of Austria)
- Château de Maisons (1642–1646)
- Hôtel de Guénégaud (1648–1651)
- Hôtel Carnavalet (1655) – remodel
- Hôtel d'Aumont – remodel after Louis Le Vau

Louis Le Vau (1612–1670)

- Apollo wing of the Louvre
- Hôtel Lambert (1640)
- Vaux-le-Vicomte (1656) – for Nicolas Fouquet; this was to be the prototype of the Palace of Versailles
- Hôtel de Lauzun (1657)
- Château de Vincennes (1659) – for Mazarin
- Palace of Versailles – reconstruction, on the model of his Vaux-le-Vicomte, as a place of fêtes
- Saint-Louis-en-l'Île church (on the Île Saint-Louis) (1664) – plans
- Collège des Quatre-Nations (now the Institut de France) – for Mazarin

Claude Perrault (1613–1688) – helped to establish French classicism

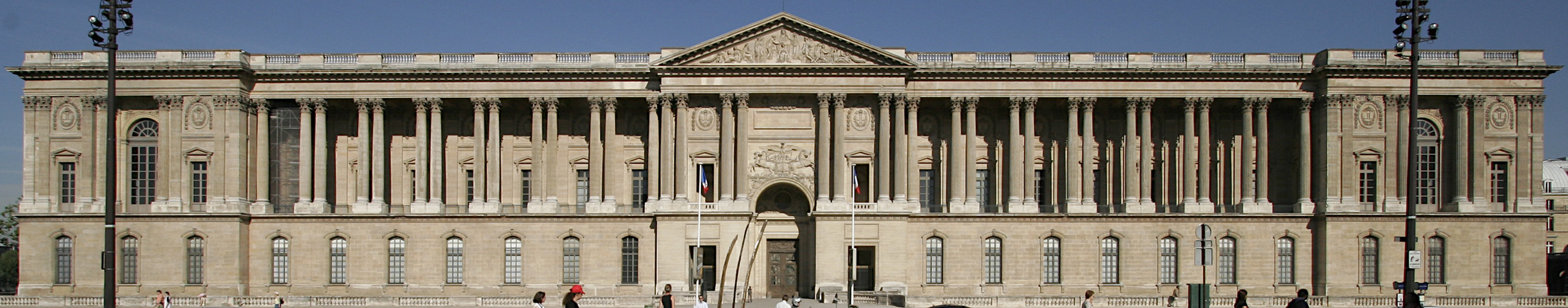
Colonnade of the Louvre, designed by Perrault, among others

- Colonnade of the Louvre (1667–1673)
- Observatoire de Paris – plans

Libéral Bruant (c. 1636–1697)

- Hôtel de la Salpêtrière (1660–1677)
- Les Invalides (1671–1676)

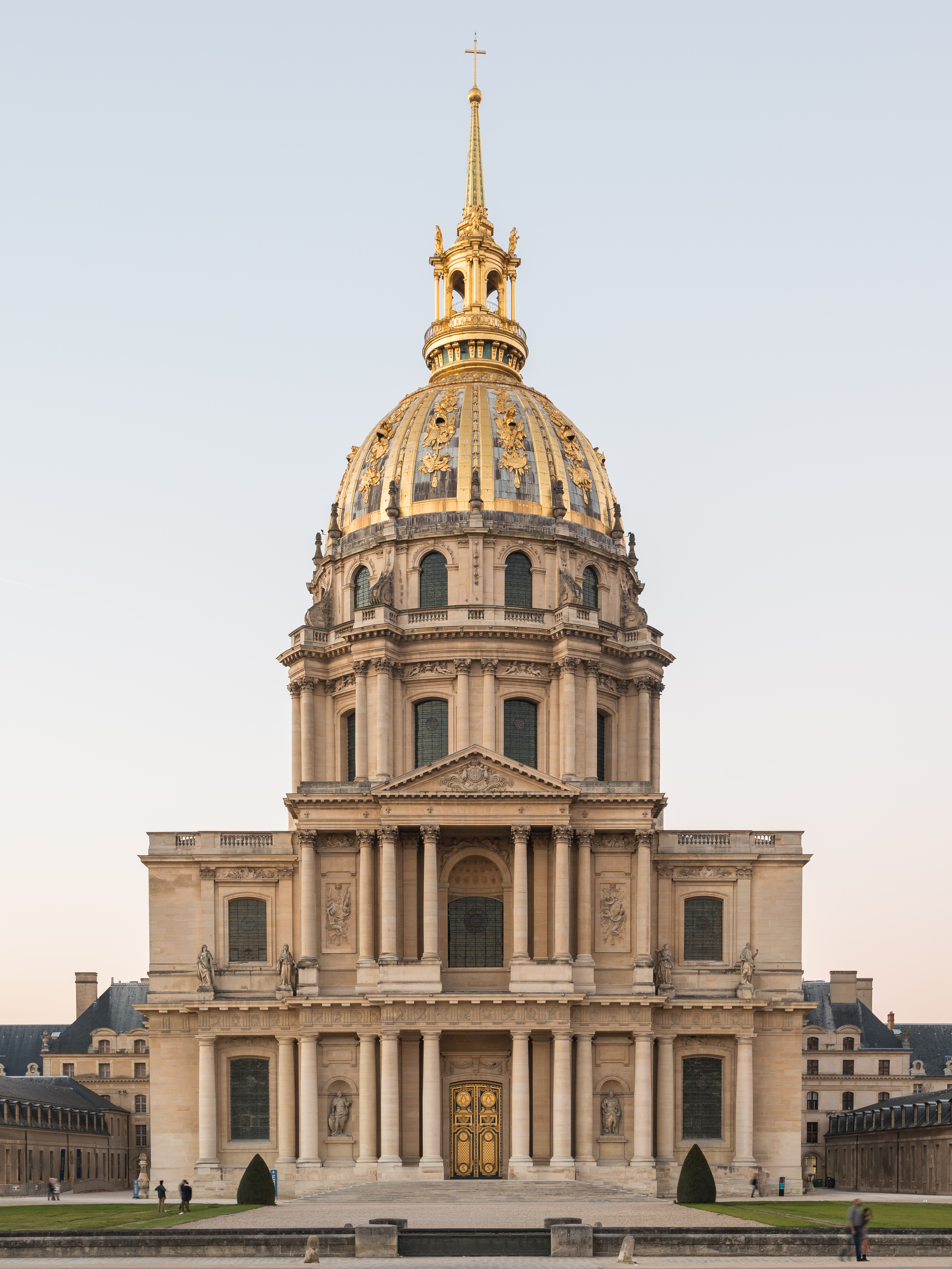
Hardouin-Mansart's chapel at Les Invalides

Jules Hardouin Mansart (Jules Hardouin; he adopted the name Mansart in 1668) (1646–1708) – responsible for the massive expansion of the palace of Versailles into a permanent royal residence.

- Palace of Versailles (from 1678) – Royal Stables, Orangerie, Grand Trianon, Chapel
- Palace of Saint-Cloud – for the Philip I, Duke of Orléans
- Château of Marly
- Domed chapel of Les Invalides
- Place des Victoires
- Place Vendôme
- Château de Meudon

Pierre Lassurance (1655–1724)

- Château de Petit-Bourg

Robert de Cotte (1656–1735) – brother-in-law of J.H. Mansart, whom he assisted on numerous projects

- Esplanade of Les Invalides
- Palais Rohan, Strasbourg

Germain Boffrand (1667–1754)

- Château Lunéville
- Remodelling of the Petit Luxembourg
- Interiors at the Hôtel de Soubise

Pierre-Alexis Delamair (1675/6–1745)

- Hôtel de Soubise
- Hôtel de Rohan

Jean Aubert (c. 1680–1741)

- Stables of the Château de Chantilly
- Hôtel Biron
- Palais Bourbon

Ange-Jacques Gabriel (1698–1782) – responsible for rococo constructions at Versailles

- Palace of Versailles (1735–1777) – apartment of the king, Versailles Opera, Library, Petit Trianon (1762–1764)
- Place de la Concorde (Place Louis XV)
- École Militaire (1751–1775)

Jacques-Germain Soufflot (1713–1780)

- The Panthéon (called the Eglise Sainte Geneviève) (1756–1780)

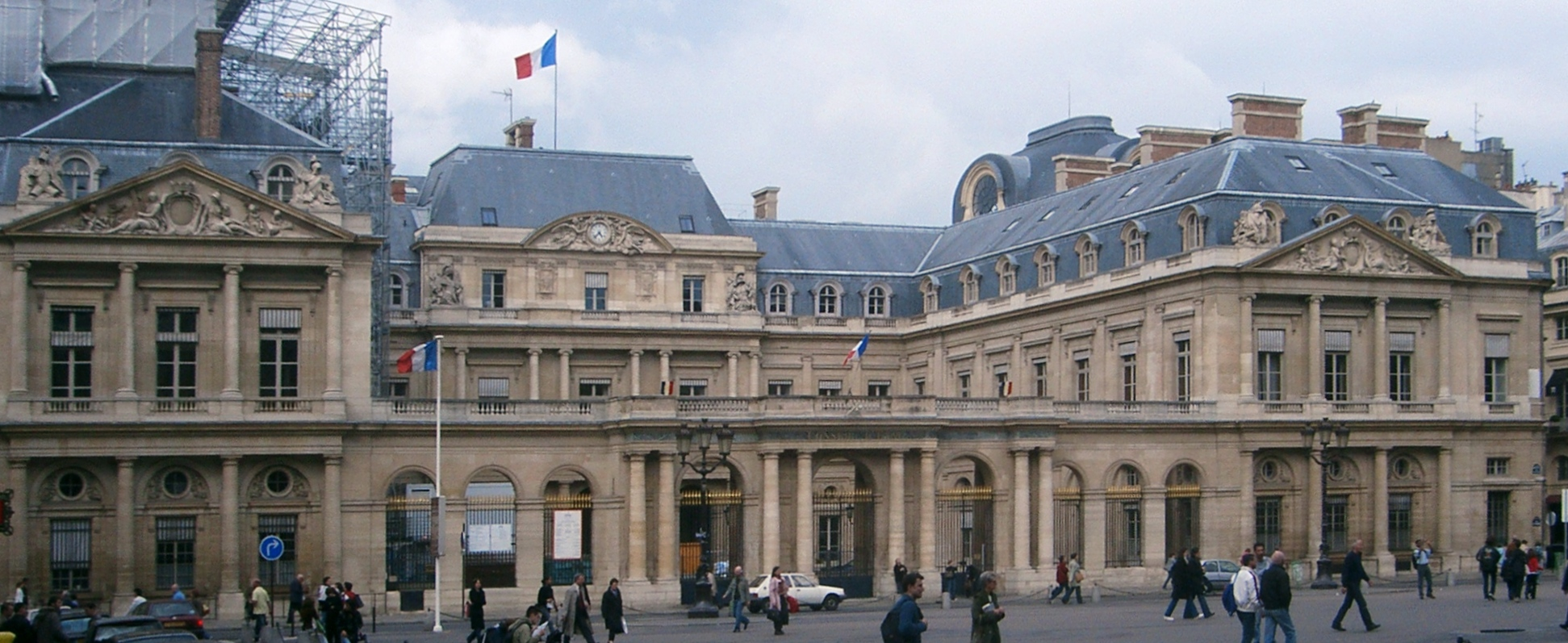
Palais-Royal entrance front by Moreau-Desproux

Pierre-Louis Moreau-Desproux (1727–1793)

- Rue St. Honoré facade of the Palais-Royal in Paris (1770)
- Second Salle du Palais-Royal, first purpose-built opera house in Paris

Étienne-Louis Boullée (1728–1799)

- Hôtel Alexandre

Joseph Brousseau (1733–1797)

- Various chateaux in the Limoges and the Limousin region

Claude Nicolas Ledoux (1736–1806) – famous for his mathematical neoclassicism.

- Wall of the Farmers-General (1784–1791) – visible at the Place de la Nation and Denfert-Rochereau
- Hôtel d'Hallwyl (remodel)
- Royal Saltworks at Arc-et-Senans (Les Salines Royales)

Jean-Jacques Lequeu (1757–1826)

== Revolution to World War II ==
Henri Labrouste (1801–1875) – famous for his use of steel

- Bibliothèque Sainte-Geneviève (1843–1861)
- National Library

Victor Baltard (1805–1874) – famous for his use of steel and glass

- Les Halles centrales (1854–1870) – destroyed in 1971 to make way for a shopping mall
- St. Eustache (church) – remodel
- Saint-Étienne-du-Mont (church) – remodel
- St. Augustin (church) (1860–1871)

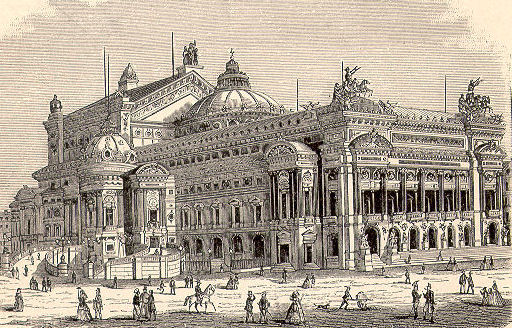
Garnier's Paris Opera

Eugène Emmanuel Viollet-le-Duc (1814–1879) – important theoretician of the 19th-century Gothic revival

- Château de Pierrefonds – restoration
- Notre Dame de Paris – restoration
- the city of Carcassonne – restoration
- Saint-Germain-des-Prés (church) – restoration
- Saint Séverin (church) – restoration

Charles Garnier (1825–1898) – celebrated architect of the Second Empire

- Palais Garnier, also known as the Paris Opera (now Opera Garnier) (1862–1875)
- Théâtre Marigny
- Casino of Monte Carlo (1878)

Clair Tisseur (1827–1896), Romanesque Revival architect and designer

- Église du Bon-Pasteur, Lyon (1875–1883)

Frantz Jourdain (1847–1935) – Art Nouveau architect and theorist

- La Samaritaine, Paris (1903–1907)

Auguste Louzier Sainte-Anne (1848–1925) – Chief architect of historic monuments

Eugène Vallin (1856–1922) – Art nouveau architect, member of the École de Nancy

- Vallin House and Studio (with Georges Biet) (1896)
- Vaxelaire Department Store (with Emile André) (1901)
- Biet Apartment House (with Georges Biet) (1902)
- Société Générale Bank/Aimé Apartment House (with Georges Biet) (1904–1906)
- École de Nancy Pavilion, Exposition Internationale de l'Est de la France (1909)

Lucien Weissenburger (1860–1929) – Art nouveau architect, member of the École de Nancy

- Magasins Réunis (department store), Nancy (1890–1907)
- Villa Majorelle, Nancy (with Henri Sauvage) (1898–1901)
- Imprimerie Royer (printing house), Nancy (1899–1900)
- Brenas Apartment House, Nancy (1902)
- Bergeret House, Nancy (1904)
- Weissenburger House, Nancy (1904–1906)
- Brasserie Excelsior and Angleterre Hotel, Nancy (with Alexandre Mienville) (1911)
- Vaxelaire, Pignot, and Company Department Store, Nancy (1913)

Hector Guimard (1867–1942) – Art nouveau architect and designer

Émile André (1871–1933) – Art nouveau architect, urbanist and artist, member of the École de Nancy

- Vaxelaire Department Store, Nancy (with Eugène Vallin) (1901)
- Parc de Saurupt, Nancy (garden-city), designer (with Henri Gutton) (1901–1906)
- Maisons Huot, Nancy (1903)
- France-Lanord Apartment Building, Nancy (1902–1903)
- Lombard Apartment Building, Nancy (1902–1904)
- Renauld Bank, Nancy (with Paul Charbonnier) (1908–1910)
- Ducret Apartment Building, Nancy (with Paul Charbonnier) (1908–1910)

Auguste Perret (1874–1954) and his brothers Claude and Gustave – important for the first use of reinforced concrete

- Théâtre des Champs-Élysées

Paul Tournon (1881–1964)

Robert Mallet-Stevens (1886–1945) – modernist architect influenced by Le Corbusier

Le Corbusier (Charles-Edouard Jeanneret) (1887–1965)

Léon Azéma (1888–1978) – appointed Architect of the City of Paris in 1928

- Douaumont ossuary (1932)

Eugène Beaudouin (1898–1983) – influential use of prefabricated elements

Jean Prouvé (1901–1984) – international style/Bauhaus-inspired

François Spoerry (1912–1999)

- Grimaud, Var, France
- Puerto Escondido, Baja California Sur, Mexico
- Port Liberté, Jersey City, New Jersey, United States
- Bendinat, Mallorca, Spain
- Saifi Village, Beirut, Lebanon

== Post World War II ==
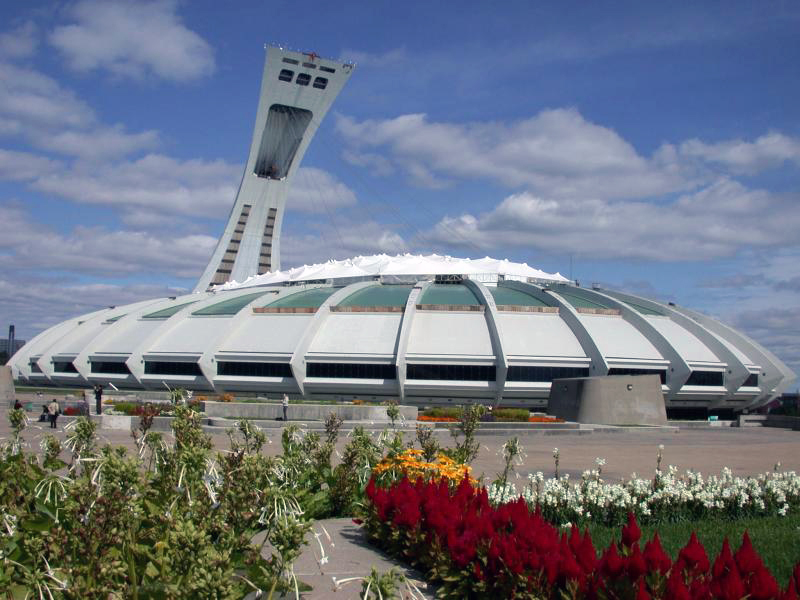
Montreal's Olympic Stadium by Roger Taillibert

Christian de Portzamparc (born 1944)

- La Villette – City of Music
- Café Beaubourg

Henry Bernard (1912–94)

- Palace of Europe

Jean-Marie Charpentier

- Shanghai Grand Theatre

Pascale Guédot (born 1960)

- Médiathèque at Oloron-Sainte-Marie (Prix de l'Équerre d'Argent)

Michel Mossessian

- Five Merchant Square in London, UK
- NATO Headquarters in Brussels, Belgium
- ExxonMobil Technology Centre in Shanghai, China

Detail from the facade of the Institut du Monde Arabe by Jean Nouvel

Jean Nouvel (born 1945)

- Institut du Monde Arabe
- Fondation Cartier
- Torre Agbar, in Barcelona, Spain
- Musée du quai Branly

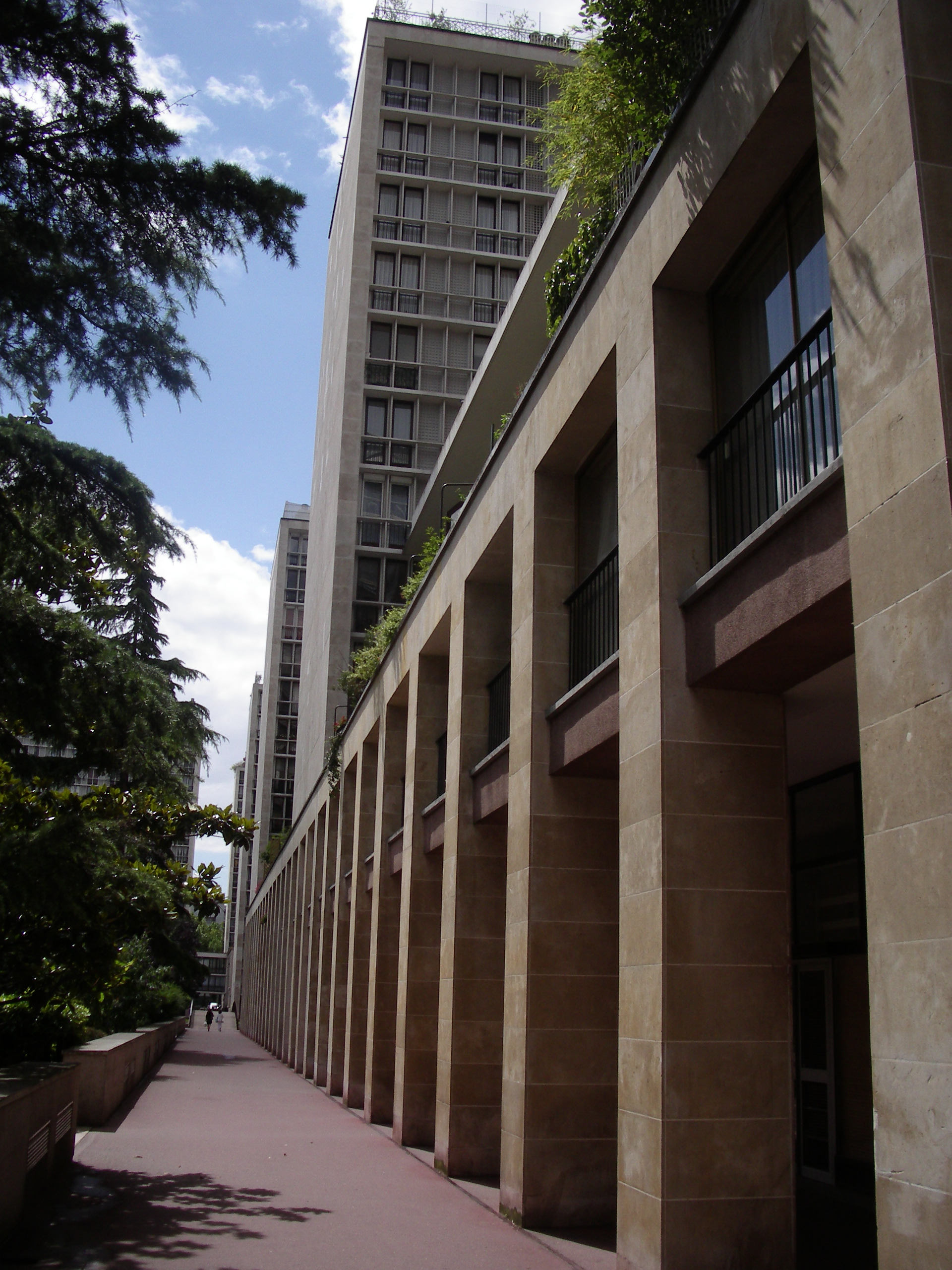
Residence Salmson Le Point du Jour, lower income residential building, Boulogne Billancourt, France by Fernand Pouillon, 1958-1963

Fernand Pouillon (1912–1986)

- Old Port of Marseille
- Tabriz railway station
- Résidence Salmson Le Point du Jour
- Chateau de Belcastel

Roger Taillibert

- Parc des Princes in Paris
- Olympic Stadium in Montreal, Quebec, Canada
- Olympic Velodrome, Montreal (now called the Montreal Biodome)
- Olympic Pool (Montreal)

Michel Pinseau

- Hassan II Mosque in Casablanca, Morocco

Philippe Ameller and Jacques Dubois

- Eurotunnel in Calais
- ISIPCA in Versailles
- Centre de la petite enfance in Issy-les-Moulineaux
- Lycée Louis-Armand in Eaubonne
- Police station in Provins

Florent Nédélec, DPLG

- The Jervois Hong Kong
- Yong He Yuan Taiwan

Philippe Maidenberg

- 123 Sebastopol (2011–2013)
- Joyce Hotel (2008–2009)
- Bel Ami (2012)
- Triangle D'Or (2009–2010)
- Hotel 34 B (2014–2015)

== See also ==
- French Baroque architecture
- List of architects
- List of French people
