= Nédélec (name) =

Nédélec is a French surname of Breton origin.

It may refer to:

- Florent Nédélec, French architect
- Michel Nédélec (1940-2009), French cyclist
- Raymonde Nédélec (1915-2016), French politician
- Jean-Marie Nédélec (1834-1896), French missionary and namesake of the Canadian municipality of Nédélec
