= Helen Rosenau =

- Born: Helene Rosenau; 23 March 1900; Monte Carlo
- Died: 27 October 1984 (aged 84); London
- Other name: Helen Rosenau-Carmi
- Citizenship: British (naturalized 1948)
- Occupations: Academic, art and architectural historian
- Employer(s): University of London, University of Manchester
- Known for: Women in Art: from Type to Personality (1944): "one of the first feminist tracts in art history"

Helen Rosenau (23 March 1900–27 October 1984) was a German-born British academic, feminist, and historian of art and architecture. Her 1944 work Women in Art has been described as "one of the first feminist tracts in art history". Forced to leave Germany during the 1930s, Rosenau was one of a number of influential European Jewish intellectuals who brought innovation to academic study in the UK and US.

== Early life and education ==
Helen Rosenau was born in Monte Carlo, the daughter of medical doctor Albert Rosenau and mother Klara Rosenau (née Lion). She was raised in Monte Carlo and in Bad Kissingen, Germany, in a wealthy family, and received her education through private tutoring. After finishing high school in 1923, Rosenau studied art history at a number of universities, including Munich under Heinrich Wölfflin, Berlin under Adolph Goldschmidt, Bonn under Paul Clemen, and Hamburg under Erwin Panofsky. Notably Rosenau was the first person to excavate the Bremen Cathedral in 1931.

Rosenau's 1930 dissertation, on the topic of Cologne cathedral, was submitted in Hamburg. She moved then to the University of Münster, planning to complete her Habilitation on medieval architecture. With the rise of the Nazi government, Rosenau had her scholarship withdrawn and she was removed from the university. With her mother, she emigrated first to Switzerland and then to the United Kingdom - arriving in 1933. Supported by a stipend from the British Federation of University Women, Rosenau completed her habilitation, Design and Medieval Architecture, in 1934. She continued her studies at The Courtauld Institute of Art, earning her PhD in 1940.

Rosenau's repeated requests during 1935 to visit her mother in Baden-Baden were rejected by German authorities, who described her as "subversive" and accused her of having a "communist attitude". In 1940, she was placed on the Sonderfahndungsliste G.B., a list of people named for arrest in the event of a successful invasion of Britain.

Rosenau married Zwi Carmi (b. 1883), a doctor, in 1938. They adopted a son, Michael, in 1944. She became a naturalized British subject in 1948. Rosenau's husband died in 1950.

== Career ==
From 1935, Rosenau contributed regularly to a number of British academic publications, including Apollo, The Burlington Magazine, and the RIBA Journal. Her articles encompassed art history, as well as her wider educational, feminist, and humanist interests. Rosenau's "progressive humanist and feminist outlook" was also evident in her lectures to the Conway Hall Ethical Society, and columns for the International Women's News.

From the 1940s, Rosenau also gave adult education lectures for the Extra-Mural Department of the University of London, the London County Council (LCC), and the Workers' Educational Association (WEA). She resumed this after her retirement After her retirement, continuing extra-mural lectures for the University of London and Polytechnic of Central London's School of Architecture.

From 1941, Rosenau worked at the London School of Economics under the sociologist Karl Mannheim, researching the historical depiction of women in art. The work she produced, Woman in Art: from Type to Personality, has been called "one of the first feminist tracts in art history"; described as "erudite and accessible", and deserving of a place "in the historiographies of both feminist thought and cutting-edge art history across two centuries." She had previously contributed a short article entitled "Changing Attitudes Towards Women" to an anthology published by the Free German League of Culture: Women Under the Swastika (1942).

After the war, Rosenau continued her career in academia, lecturing at universities including the University of London (1947-1951; 1968- ), and the University of Manchester (1951-1968). Her first English language art history book was published in 1948, on the French artist Jacques-Louis David.

At the University of Manchester, Rosenau's research focused on the work of French architect she researched the French Revolutionary architect Étienne-Louis Boullée, whose treatise, Architecture, Essai sur L'art, she edited and published in 1953. In 1959, she published The Ideal City in its Architectural Evolution. Of this, History Today wrote that "the book's main strength lies in its author's synoptic vision and her exposition of the relation between philosophical ideals and architectural forms."

Rosenau returned to the University of London in 1968, lecturing also at the progressive Jewish Leo Baeck College.

== Death and legacy ==
Helen Rosenau died in London on 27 October 1984.

In 2023, Yale University Press published a new edition of Rosenau's Women in Art, marking the eightieth anniversary of its original publication. The new setting in full colour is prefaced by a personal memoir by a former student, Adrian Rifkin, a study of the author's life in Britain as a refugee scholar by Rachel Dickson and a portrait of Rosenau as feminist intellectual followed by a suite of seven essays by Griselda Pollock analysing the significance of the book as a work of feminist social history of art .

== Selected bibliography ==
=== Books ===
- Women in Art: from Type to Personality (1944)
- The Painter Jacques-Louis David (1948)
- A Short History of Jewish Art (1948)
- Boullee's Treatise on Architecture (1954)
- Social Purpose in Architecture: Paris and London Compared, 1760-1800 (1970)
- The Ideal City: Its Architectural Evolution in Europe (1975)
- Boullée & visionary architecture (1976)
- Vision of the Temple: the Image of the Temple of Jerusalem in Judaism and Christianity (1979)

=== Articles ===
- Der kölner Dom: seine Baugeschichte und historische Stellung (dissertation; 1930)
- Design and Medieval Architecture (1934)
- The Synagogue and Protestant Church Architecture (1941)
- Architecture and the French Revolution: Jean Jacque Lequeu (1949)
- Historical Aspects of the Vitruvian Tradition in Town Planning (1955)
- Gottfried Semper and German Synagogue Architecture (1977)
