= Florent Nédélec =

French architect

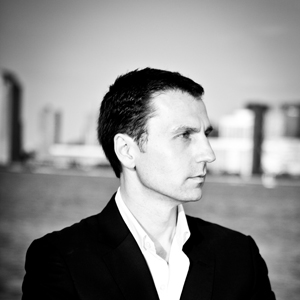
- Education: École nationale supérieure d'architecture de Paris-La Villette; Georgia Institute of Technology
- Occupation: Architect
- Awards: Big River Prize, Best Business Hotels 2012, A+ Award Finalist 2014
- Practice: NEDELEC Architecture Website
- Buildings: The Jervois, Hong Kong; Yong He Yuan, Taipei
- Projects: The Hainan Resort, China

Florent Nédélec (French pronunciation: [flɔʁɑ̃ nedelɛk]) is a French architect. He studied architecture in France and the United States and graduated with a “Diplôme d’Architecte DPLG” from the École nationale supérieure d'architecture de Paris-La Villette in Paris, France and a Master of Architecture from the Georgia Institute of Technology in Atlanta, USA. Florent Nédélec is a registered architect with “l’Ordre des architectes d’Île-de-France” in Paris, France. His projects reflect a sensibility for minimalism.

== Biography ==
Prior to starting his own practice in 2007, Florent Nédélec worked with several architectural firms, including Atelier Jean Nouvel and Pei Cobb Freed & Partners Architects LLP, formerly known as I.M. Pei & Partners. He later became a principal of the New York architectural firm Frank Williams & Partners Architects LLP to work on multiple high-rise buildings in New York, Dubai and Moscow.

== Practice ==
Nédélec's firm has offices in Central, Hong Kong and Phuket.

== Projects ==
Nédélec has designed a number of buildings across the world:

- 2015, Usherea Villa, Phuket, Thailand
- 2015, Eight South Lane, Sai Wan, Hong Kong
- 2014, Queen's Road Hotel, Central, Hong Kong
- 2014, Yong He Yuan Residences, Taipei, Taiwan
- 2012, Whitfield Hotel, North Point, Hong Kong
- 2012, The Jervois, Sheung Wan, Hong Kong
- 2008, Bonham Strand Hotel, Central, Hong Kong
- 2007, 3 West 57 Residential Tower, New York (with Frank Williams & Partners Architects LLP)
- 2007, Connaught Road Office Building, Central, Hong Kong (with Frank Williams & Partners Architects LLP)

== See also ==
- List of architects
- List of French architects
