= Étienne-Louis Boullée =

French architect (1728–1799)

- Born: 12 February 1728; Paris, France
- Died: 4 February 1799 (aged 70); Paris, France
- Occupation: Architect
- Practice: Neoclassicism
- Buildings: Hôtel Alexandre

Étienne-Louis Boullée (French: [etjɛn lwi bule]; 12 February 1728 – 4 February 1799) was a visionary French neoclassical architect whose work greatly influenced contemporary architects.

== Life ==
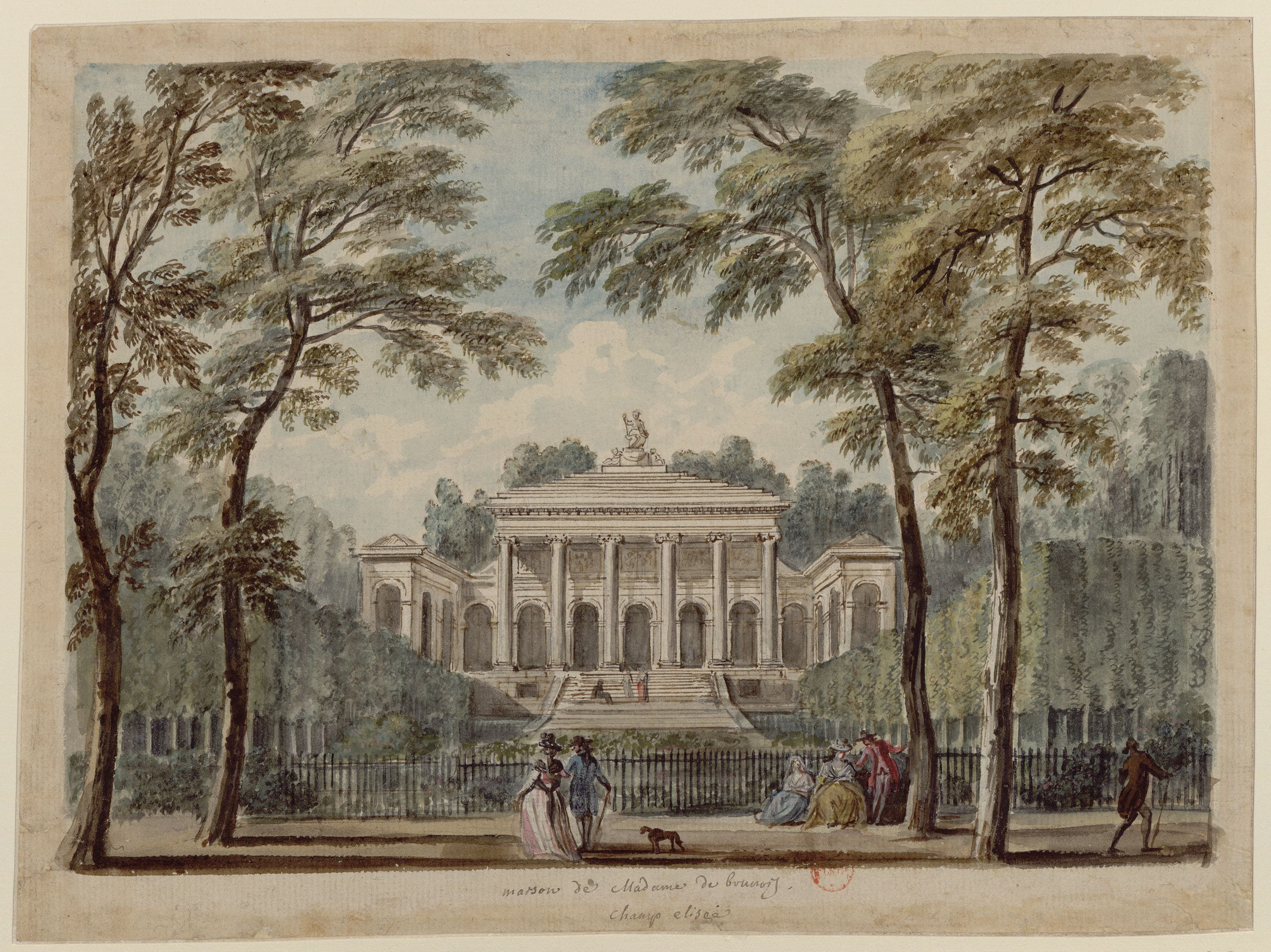
Hôtel de Brunoy, ca. 1780

Born in Paris, he studied under Jacques-François Blondel, Jacques-Germain Soufflot, Germain Boffrand and Jean-Laurent Le Geay, from whom he learned the mainstream French Classical architecture in the 17th and 18th century and the Neoclassicism that evolved after the mid century. His early designs included a lighthouse with a cryptic "saturation chamber" (possibly a ventilation room). He was elected to the Académie Royale d'Architecture in 1762 and became chief architect to Frederick II of Prussia, a largely honorary title. He designed a number of private houses from 1762 to 1778, though most of these no longer exist; notable survivors into the modern era include the Hôtel de Brunoy (demolished in 1930) and the Hôtel Alexandre, both in Paris. His work for François Racine de Monville has apparently also vanished but his probable influence on Monville's own architectural works as seen at the Désert de Retz speaks for itself. Together with Claude Nicolas Ledoux, he was one of the most influential figures of French neoclassical architecture.

== Design philosophy ==
Boullée made his biggest impact as a teacher and theorist at the École Nationale des Ponts et Chaussées between 1778 and 1788, when he developed a distinctive abstract geometric style inspired by Classical forms. His work was characterised by the removal of all unnecessary ornamentation, the inflation of geometric forms to a huge scale, and the repetition of elements such as columns in huge ranges.

For Boullée, regularity, symmetry and variety were the golden rules of architecture.

== Projects ==
=== Cenotaph for Sir Isaac Newton ===
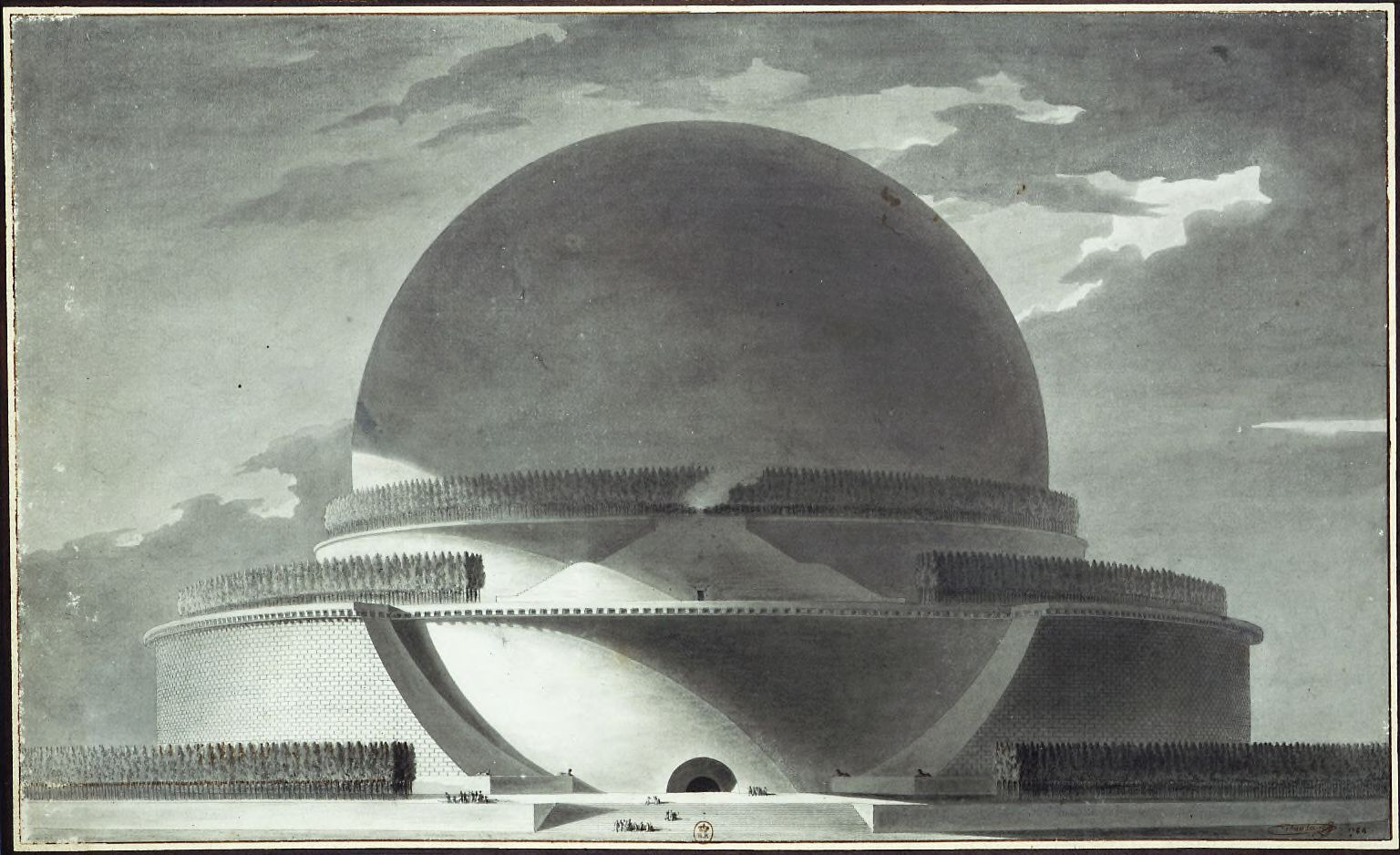
Boullée, Cénotaphe à Newton (1784)

Boullée promoted the idea of making architecture expressive of its purpose, a doctrine that his detractors termed architecture parlante ("talking architecture"), which was an essential element in Beaux-Arts architectural training in the later 19th century. His style was most notably exemplified in his proposal for a cenotaph (a funerary monument celebrating a figure interred elsewhere) for the English scientist Isaac Newton, who 50 years after his death became a symbol of Enlightenment ideas.

The building itself was a 150 metres (490 feet) tall sphere, taller than the Great Pyramids of Giza, encompassed by two large barriers circled by hundreds of cypress trees. The massive, spherical shape of the building was inspired by Boullée's own study called "theory of bodies" where he claims that the most beautiful and perfect natural body is the sphere, which is the most prominent element of the Newton Memorial. Though the structure was never built, Boullée had many ink and wash drawings engraved and circulated widely within professional circles in 1784.

The small sarcophagus for Newton would have been placed at the lower pole of the sphere. The design of the memorial was intended to create the effect of day and night. The night effect would have occurred when the sarcophagus is illuminated by the sunlight coming through the holes in the vaulting, giving the illusion of stars in the night sky. The day effect would have been provided via an armillary sphere hanging in the center that gives off a mysterious glow. Thus, the use of light in the building's design would have caused the building's interior to change its appearance.

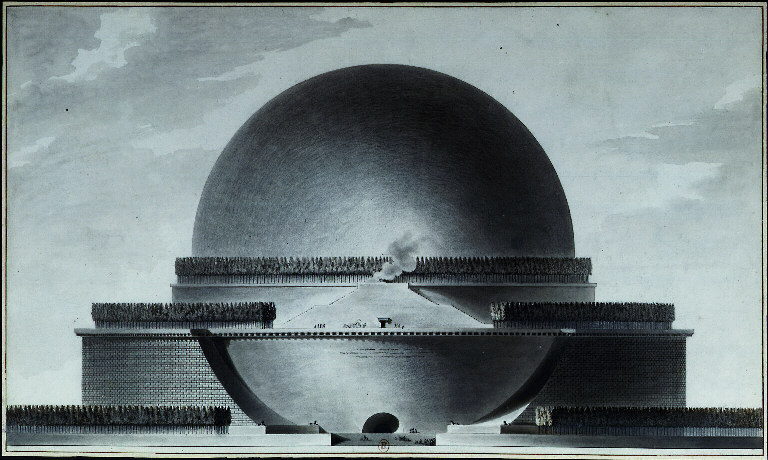
Project for the Cénotaphe à Newton, 1784

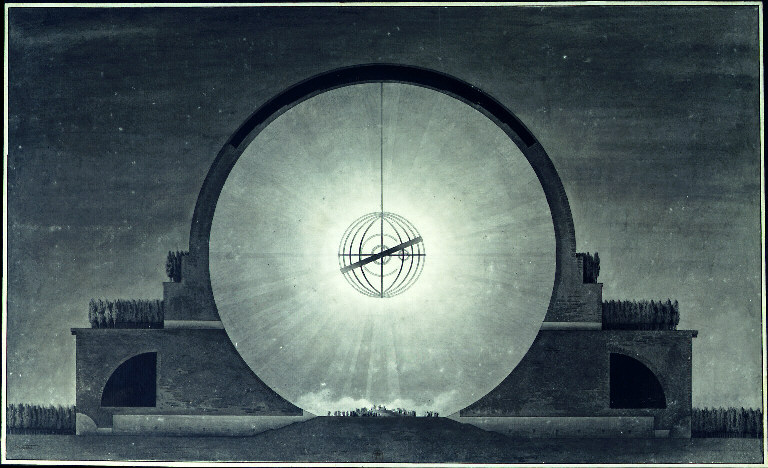
Cross-section with day effect

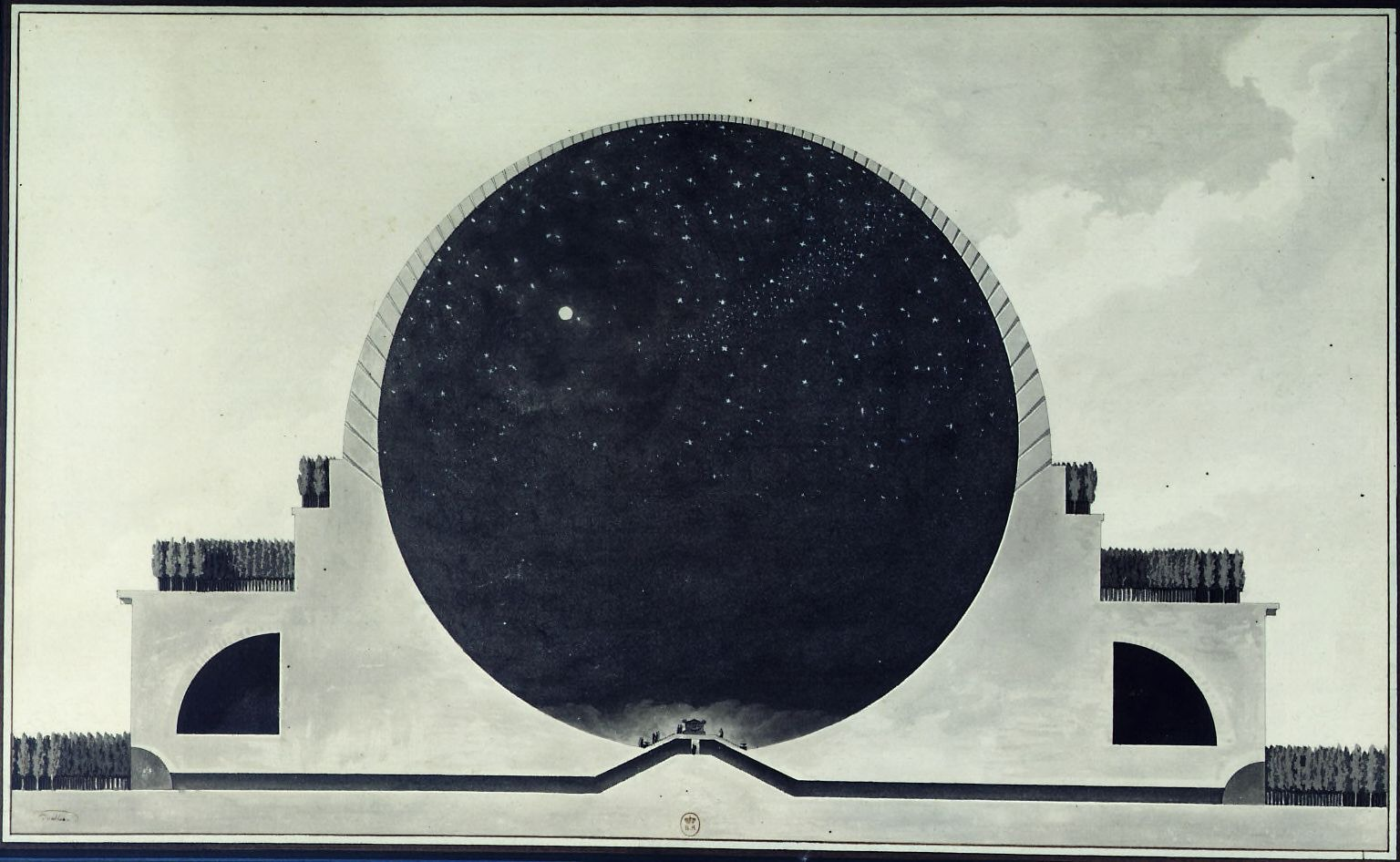
Cross-section with night effect

=== Salon for the Hôtel de Tourolles ===
The boiseries, still often dated in the mid-1760s, were discussed in the issue of L'Avant-coureur for 21 January 1761, and so must have been carried out about 1758–59. The Hôtel in the Marais district remodelled for Claude-Charles-Dominique Tourolle survives (the rue d'Orléans is now the rue Charlot) but the salon's boiseries and chimneypieces were removed in the mid-nineteenth century to a house in the rue du Faubourg Saint-Honoré now in the possession of the Cercle Interallié. Round-arched mirrors over the chimneypieces and centering the long wall in a shallow recess are disposed in a system of stop-fluted Ionic pilasters. White marble-draped caryatid therm figures support the chimneypiece's tablette. There is a full architrave under a dentilled cornice. The white-and-gold ensemble would still have been fully in style in 1790.

=== Hôtel Alexandre ===
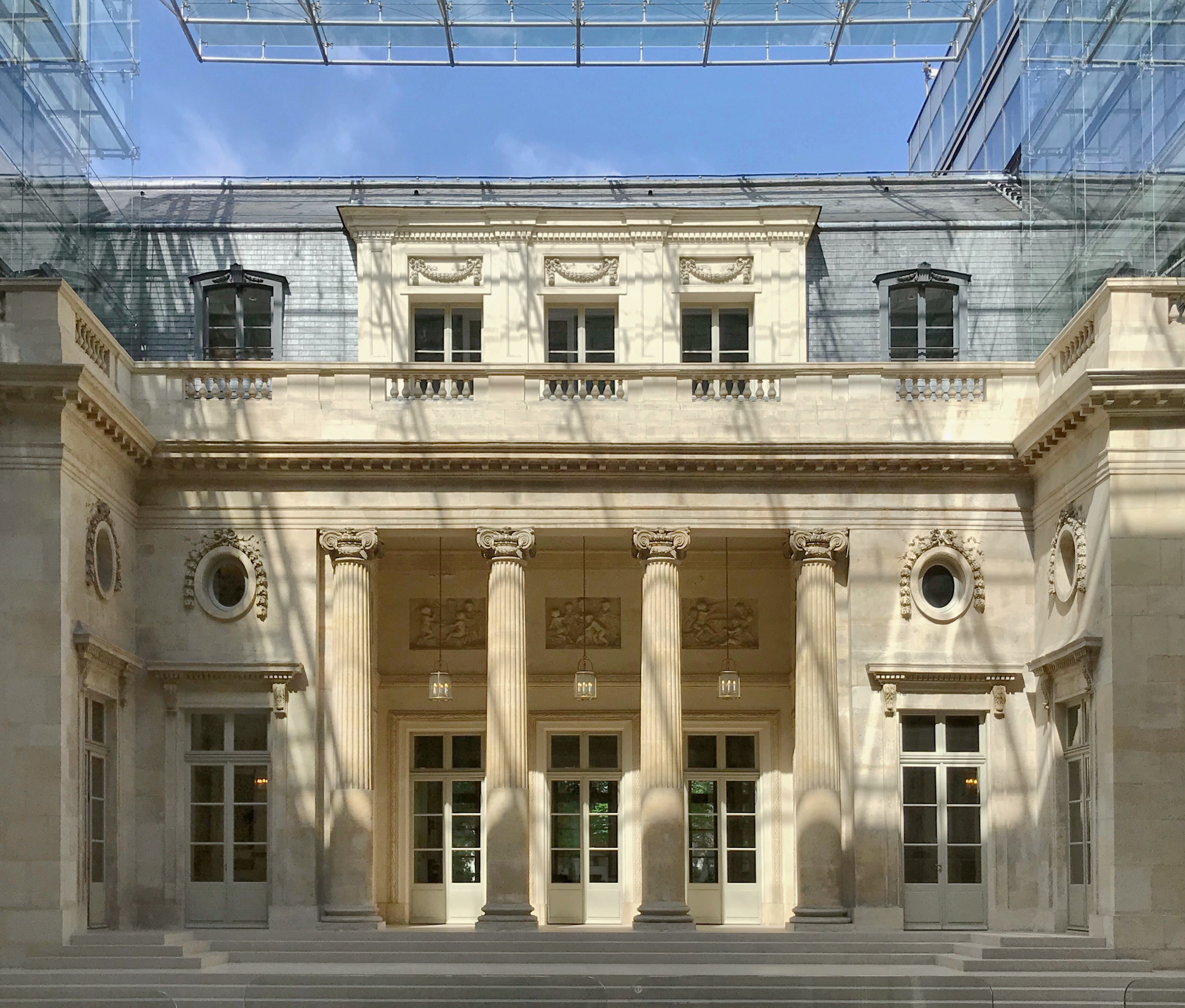
Hôtel Alexandre in 2019

The Hôtel Alexandre or Hôtel Soult, rue de la Ville l'Évêque, Paris (1763–1766), is the sole survivor of Boullée's residential work in Paris. It was built for the financier André-Claude-Nicolas Alexandre. In its cour d'honneur four Ionic columns embedded against a recess in the wall plane create an entry (now glazed). Flanking doors in the corners of the courtyard have isolated architraves embedded in the wall above their plain openings, while above oval bull's-eye windows are draped with the swags of husks that became a common feature of the neoclassical manner. The garden front has a colossal order of pilasters raised on the high basement occupied by the full height of the ground floor.

=== Project for a metropole ===
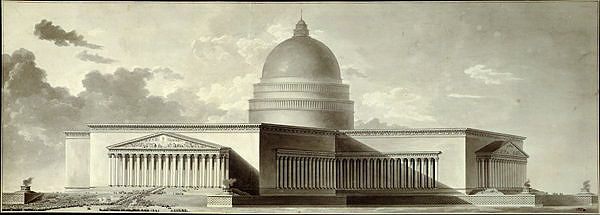
Project for a metropole, 1781 or 1782.

In around 1781, Boullée designed an architecture plan called Project for a metropole, which deals with light, as do many of his designs, as an important element. Light is a metaphor for enlightenment as is darkness for ignorance. The plan features columns spaced closer together than the canon for classical architecture would have them be placed and oversized pendentives.

== Gallery of projects ==
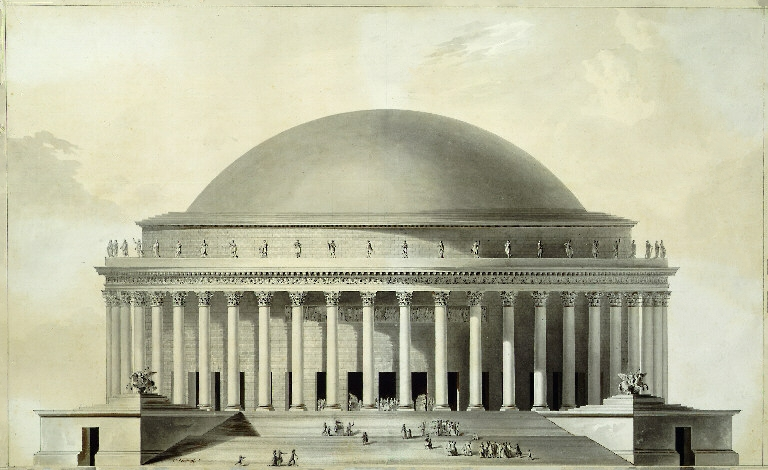
Project for a Paris opera house, 1781.

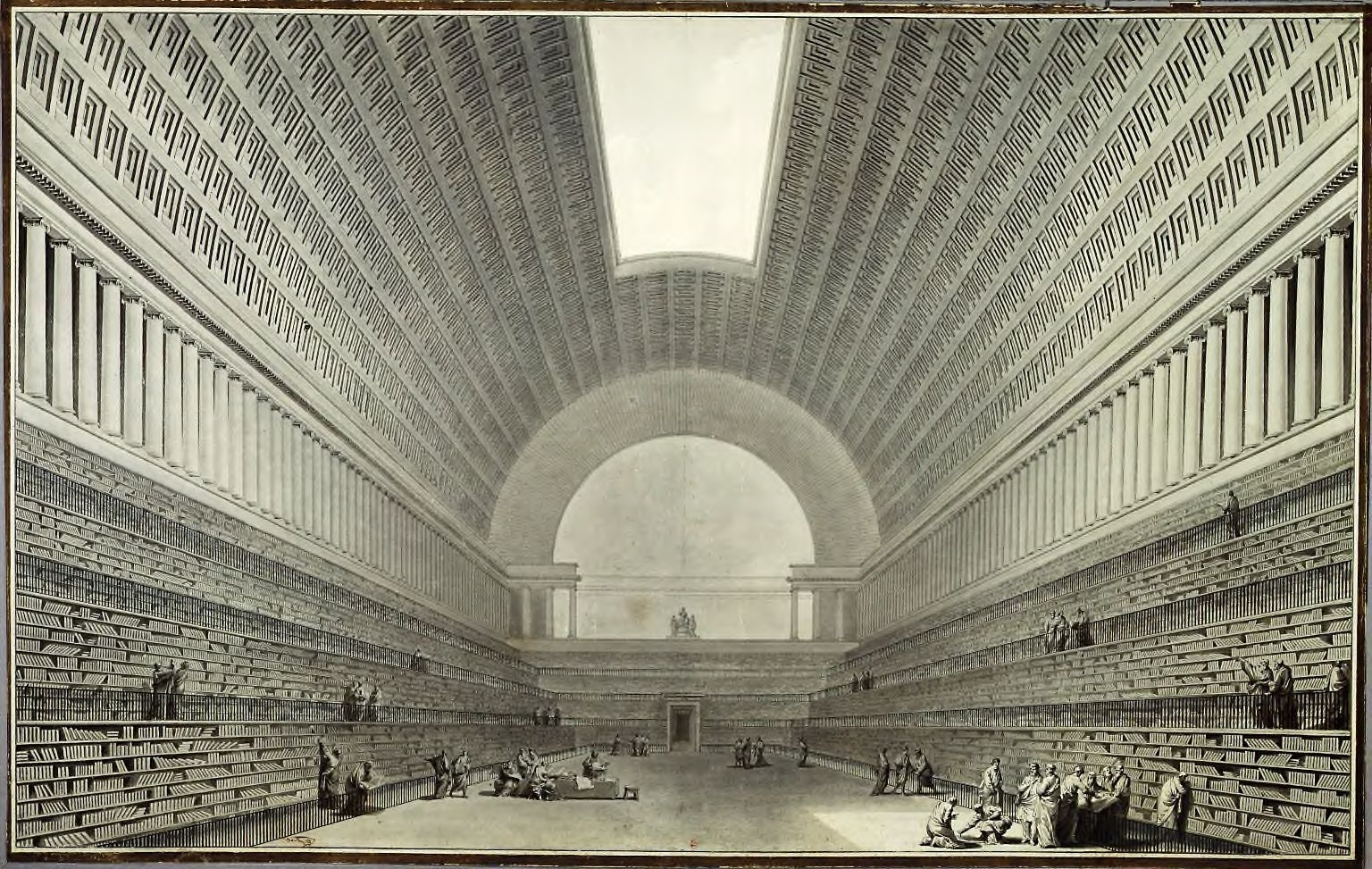
Project for a royal library, 1785.

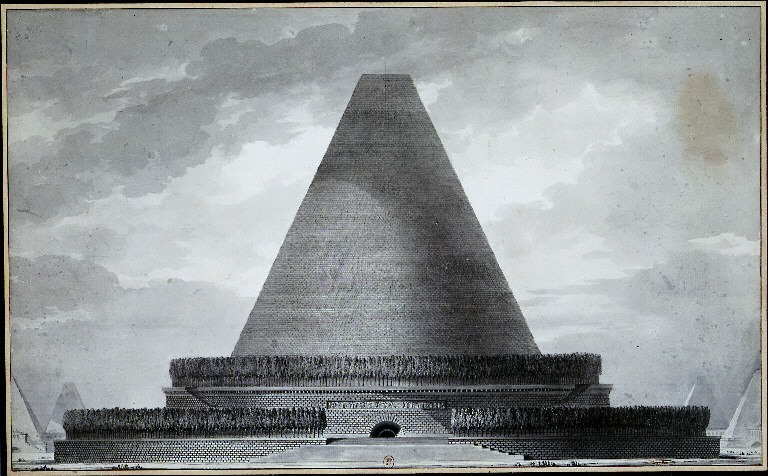
Project for a cenotaph in the Egyptian style, 1786.

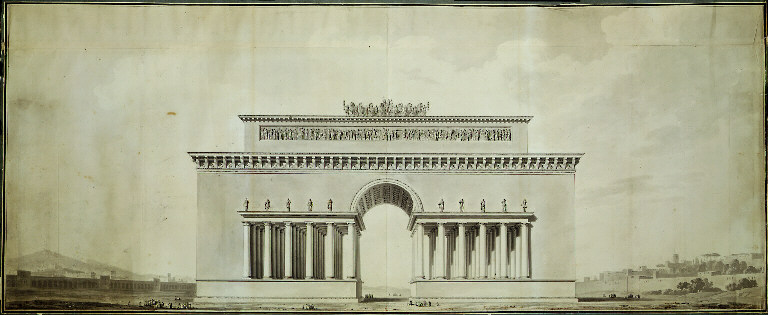
Project for an Arc de Triomphe.

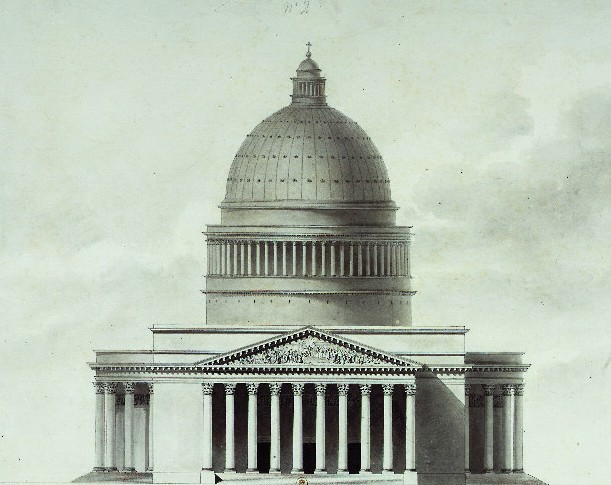
Project for the Church of the Madeleine, between 1777 and 1781.

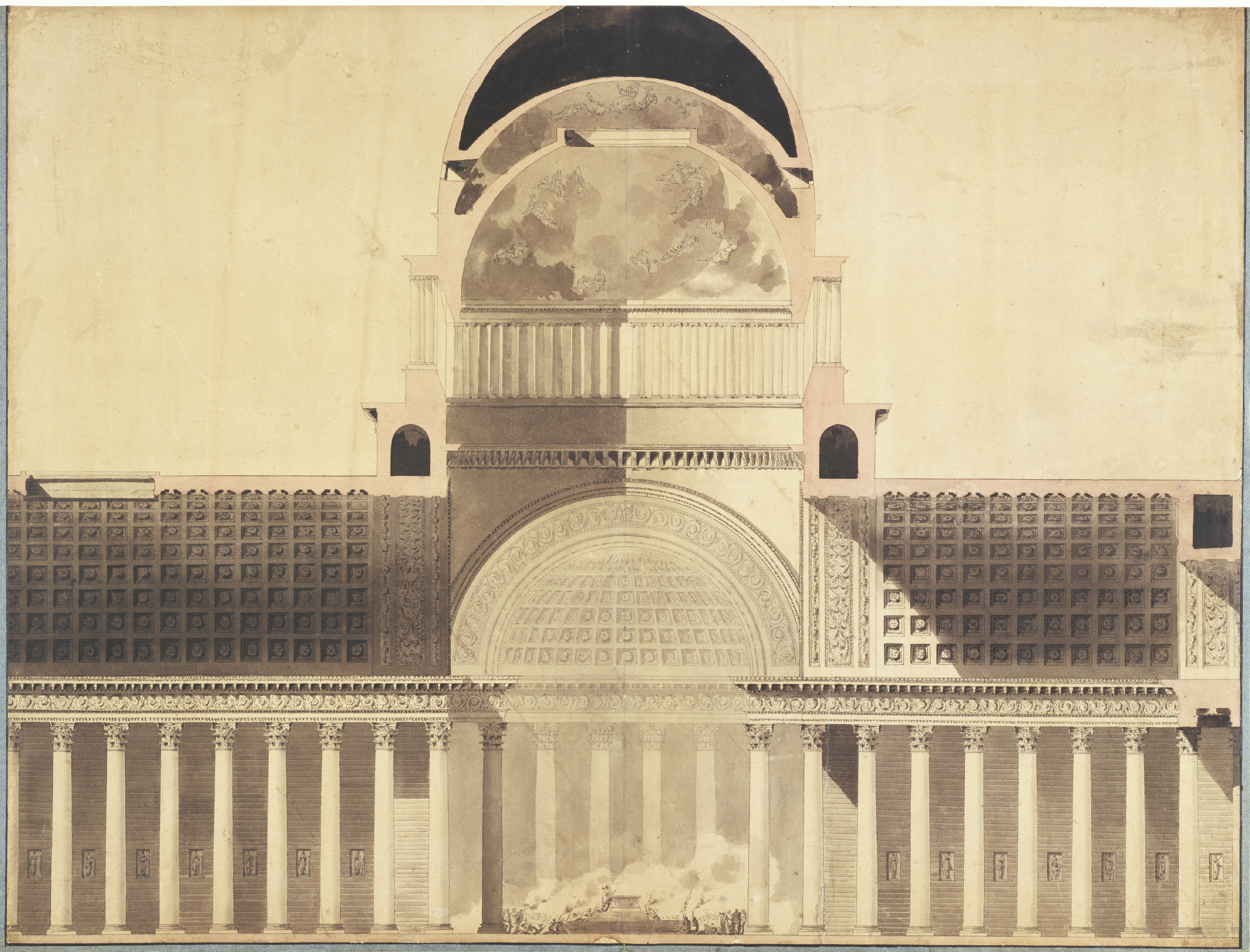
Project for the Church of the Madeleine, interior view

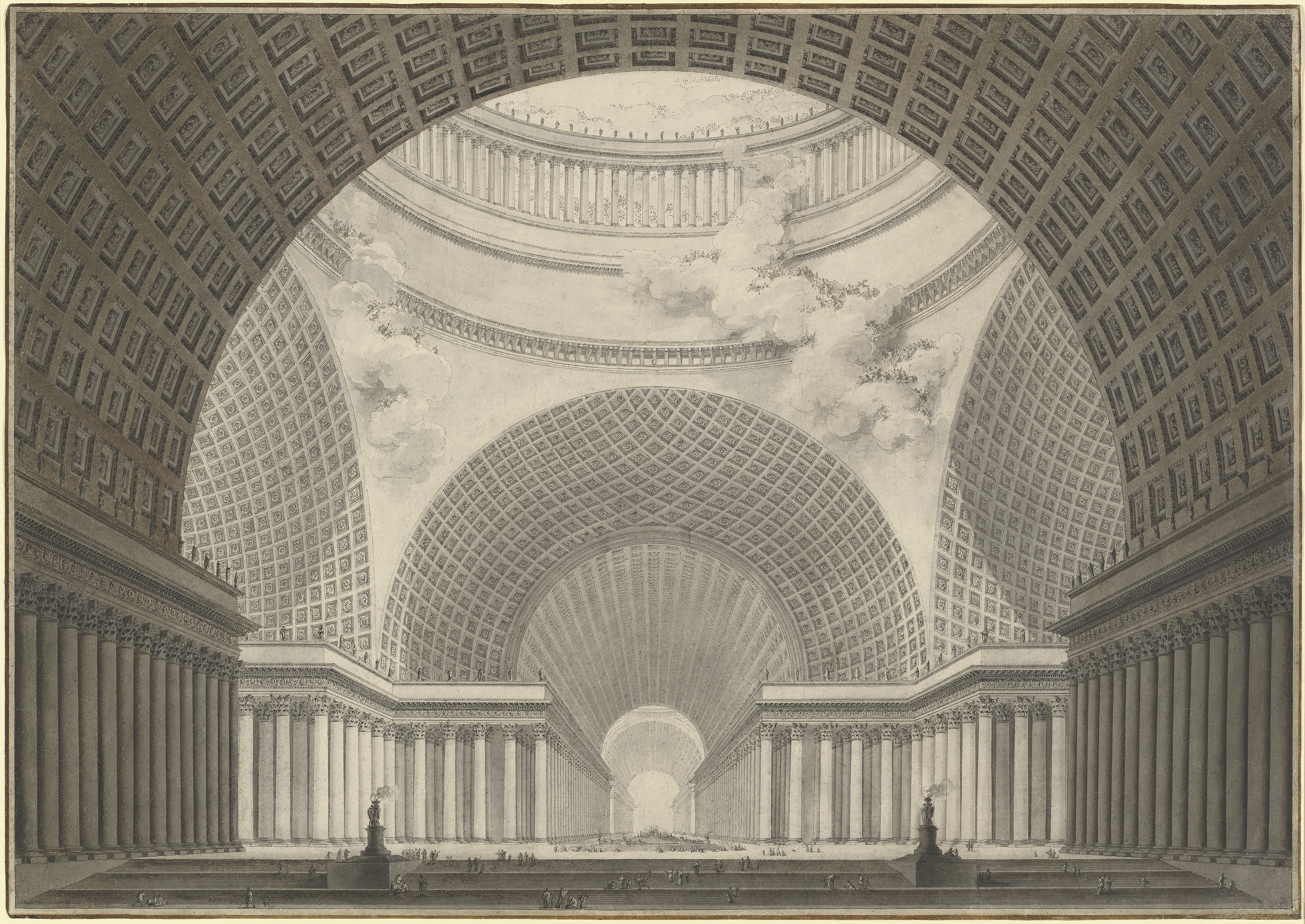
Project for the interior of a metropolitan church.

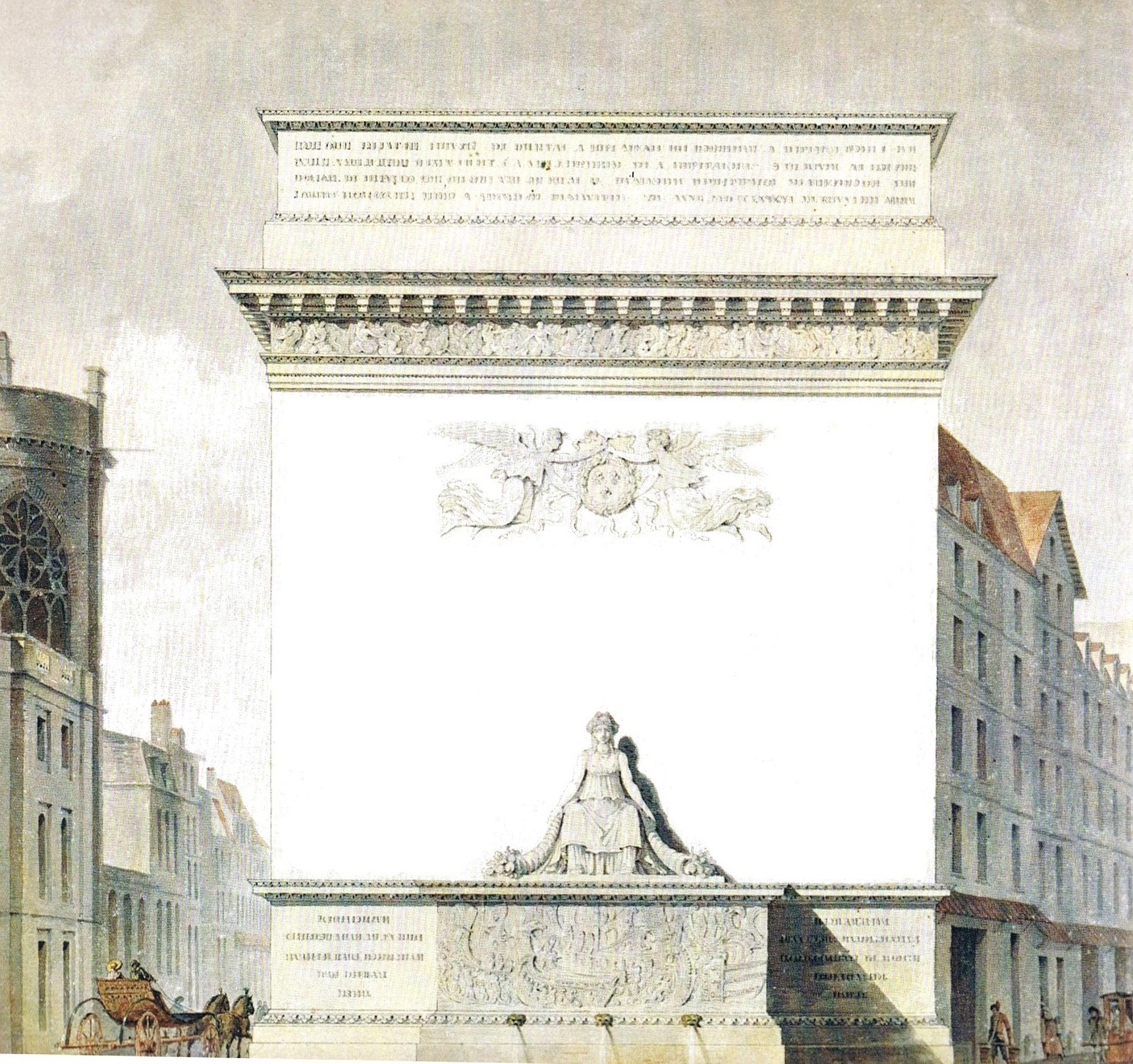
Project for a fountain near Saint-Eustache, Paris, 1766.

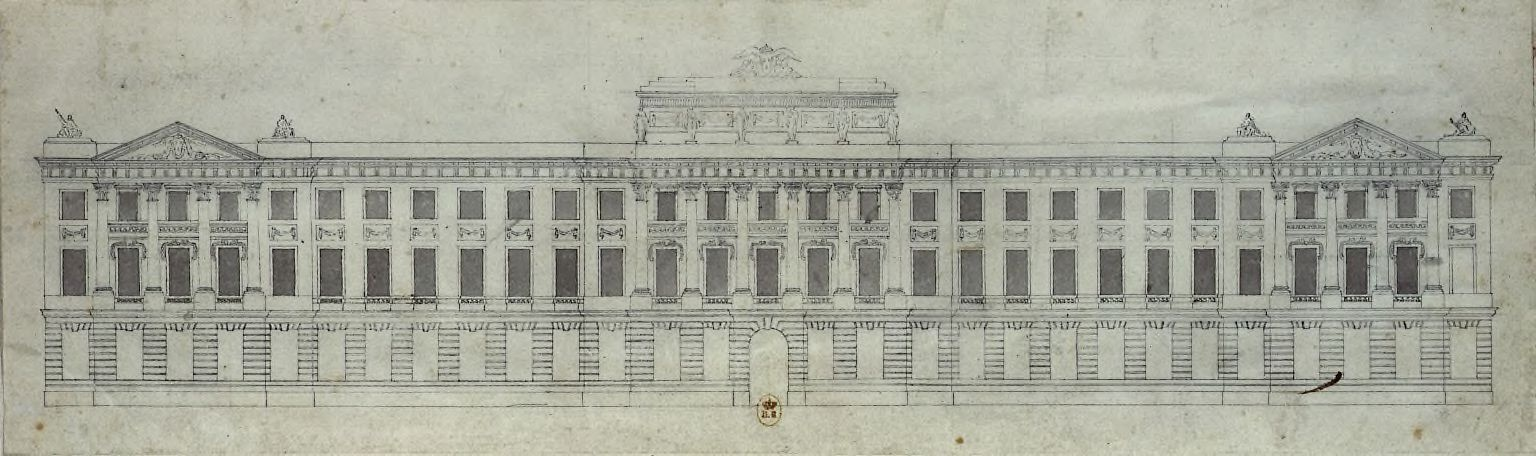
Project for a mint.

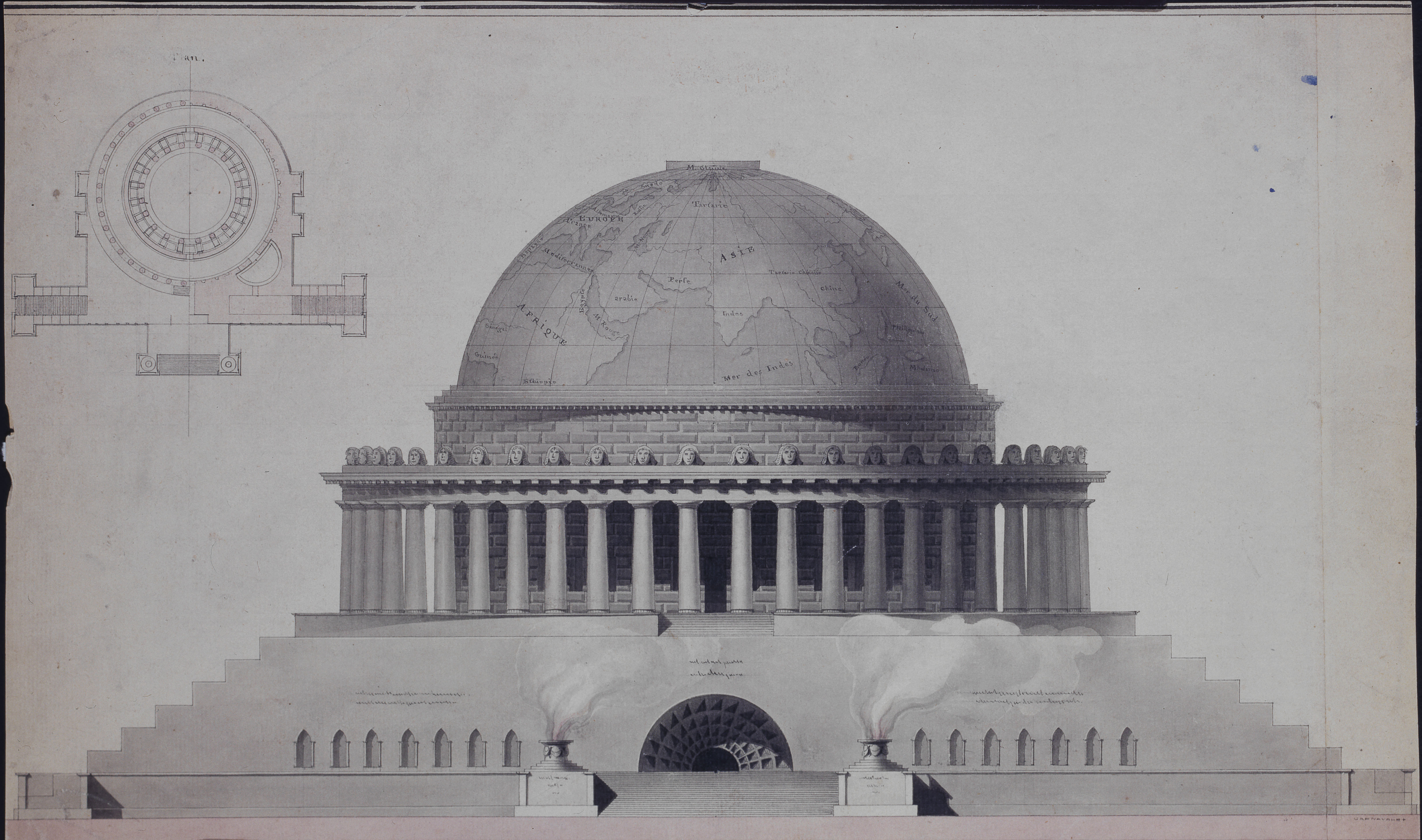
Building project.

== Legacy ==
Boullée's ideas had a major influence on his contemporaries, not least because of his role in teaching other important architects such as Jean-François Chalgrin, Alexandre-Théodore Brongniart, and Jean-Nicolas-Louis Durand. Some of his work only saw the light of day in the 20th century; his book Architecture, essai sur l'art ("Essay on the Art of Architecture), arguing for an emotionally committed Neoclassicism, was only published in 1953. The volume contained his work from 1778 to 1788, which mostly comprised designs for public buildings on a wholly impractical grand scale.

Boullée's fondness for grandiose designs has caused him to be characterised as both a megalomaniac and a visionary. His focus on polarity (offsetting opposite design elements) and the use of light and shadow was highly innovative, and continues to influence architects to this day. He was "rediscovered" in the 20th century and has influenced recent architects such as Aldo Rossi.

Peter Greenaway's film The Belly of an Architect (1987) concerns a fictitious architect who is staging an exhibition devoted to Boullée's work. The film contains many visual references to Boullée.

What Dreams May Come (1998) features a Library inspired by Boullée's 1785 "Deuxieme Projet pour la Bibliothèque du Roi".

Ethel Cain's song "Etienne", from the studio record Perverts (2025), is named after Boullée. Cain has stated that the song "was [her] ode to him", paying tribute to his life and work.

== Bibliography ==
- Jean-Michel Faidit, Spheres and starry temples in the Enlightenment : Boullée's Newton Cenotaph, architectural precursor to Planetaria ? Revue Planetarian, December 2003, pp. 6–13.
- Boullée & visionary architecture ed. Helen Rosenau, Pub. Harmony Books, New York, 1976 ISBN 0-85670-157-2.
- Boullée's Treatise on Architecture by Étienne-Louis Boullée, ed. by Helen Rosenau, pub. Alec Tiranti, Ltd. London: 1953 First Edition
- Étienne-Louis Boullée(1728-1799: Theoretician of Revolutionary Architecture) by Jean Marie Perouse De Montclos, pub.George Braziller; ISBN 0-8076-0672-3; (February 1974)
- Visionary Architects: Boullée, Ledoux, Lequeu by Jean-Claude Lemagny, pub. Hennessey & Ingalls; ISBN 0-940512-35-1; (July 2002)
- Les architectes de la liberté by Annie Jacques & Jean-Pierre Mouilleseaux, collection "Découvertes Gallimard" (nº 47), pub. Éditions Gallimard; ISBN 2-07-053067-1; (November 1988) [In French]
- A Dictionary of Architecture, James Stevens Curl, Oxford University Press (1999).
- "Boullée, Etienne-Louis (1728 - 1799)", The Hutchinson Encyclopedia, Helicon (2001).
- "Boullée, Etienne-Louis (1728 - 1799)", Crystal Reference Encyclopedia (2001).
- Patricia Likos Ricci, "Lux ex Tenebris: Étienne-Louis Boullée's Cenotaph for Sir Isaac Newton," Proceedings of the Fourth International Conference on the Inspiration of Astronomical Phenomena, Magdalen College, Oxford University. (Bristol, UK: Canopus, 2005) 355–370.
- Robin Middleton, "Boullée and the Exotic," AA Files, 19 (1990), pp. 35–49.
- Svend Eriksen, Early Neo-Classicism in France 1974. (London: Faber) translated by Peter Thornton.
