= Clair Tisseur =

French architect

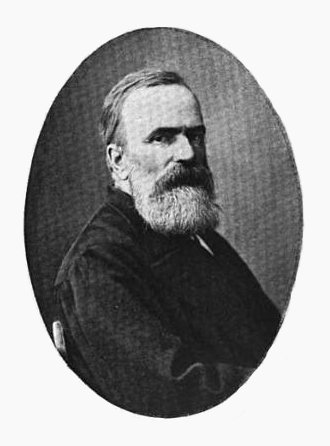
Clair Tisseur

Clair Tisseur (27 January 1827, in Sainte-Foy-lès-Lyon, Rhône – 30 September 1896, in Nyons, Drôme), was a French architect whose best known work is Église du Bon-Pasteur, a prominent Romanesque Revival church in the 1st arrondissement of Lyon. He is also remembered as a historian, linguist, biographer, poet, novelist, journalist, moralist, and satirist who frequently published his writings under the pen name Nizier du Puitspelu.

Tisseur organized and mentored a cultural society in Lyon called L'Alme et Inclyte Académie du Gourguillon, founded in 1879, that published numerous works during the Third Republic and into the 20th century. Members of the society included writers (Auguste Bleton, Henri Béraud, Monseigneur Lavarenne), artists (Pierre Combet-Descombes), and political leaders (Salles, Godard) who were active in Lyon.

French cinematographer Philippe Roger created a documentary film about Clair Tisseur entitled Clair l'obscur in 2000.

== Works as architect ==
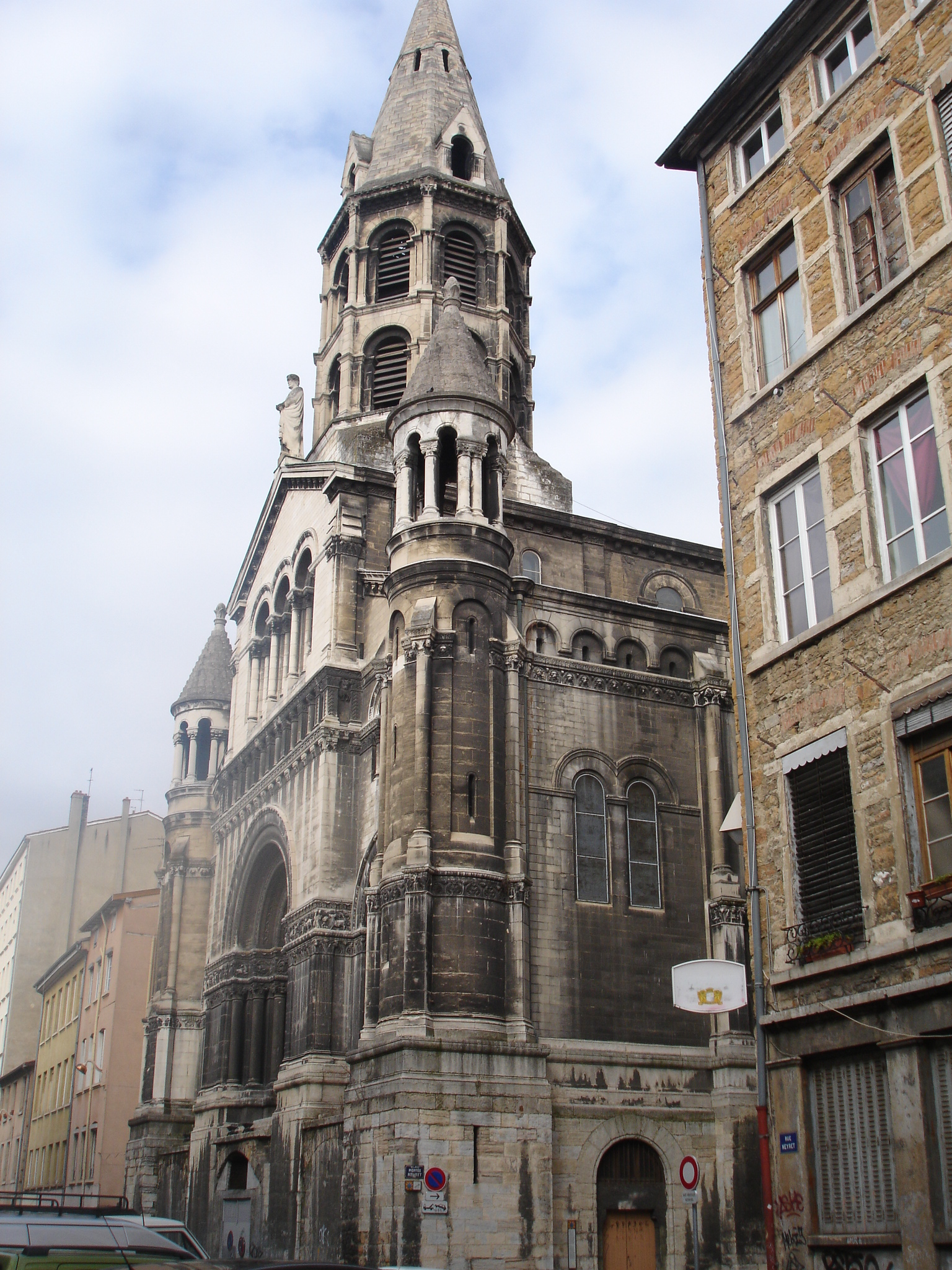
Église du Bon-Pasteur (now deconsecrated) in the La Croix-Rousse district of Lyon, designed in 1875 by Clair Tisseur

- City hall of the 2nd arrondissement of Lyon
- Église Saint-Clair de Brignais, 1859-1862 in Brignais (Rhône),
- Église Saint-Jean de Chabeuil, 1862 in Chabeuil (Drôme),
- Église Saint-Claude de Tassin, 1866-1868 in Tassin-la-Demi-Lune (Rhône),
- Église Saint-Martin d'Orliénas, Orliénas (Rhône),
- Église Sainte-Blandine, 1863-1869 in the 2nd arrondissement of Lyon,
- Église du Bon-Pasteur, 1875-1883 in the 1st arrondissement of Lyon,
- Église de Saint-Laurent-d'Agny, 1858 in Saint-Laurent-d'Agny (Rhône),
- Église de Saint-Ferréol, in Saint-Ferréol-d'Auroure (Haute-Loire),
- Several houses in the rue de la République (Lyon).

== Writings ==
Fascinated by the history of the city of Lyon, its culture, and its regional Franco-Provençal dialect, Claude Tisseur penned numerous newspapers articles, narrative writings, and scholarly language studies, as well as humorous works. These include Les vieilleries lyonnaises in 1879, Les oisivetés du sieur Puitspelu in 1883, Très humble traité de phonétique lyonnaise in 1885, and Les Coupons d'un atelier lyonnais published posthumously. Le Littré de la Grand'Côte, his popular dictionary in Lyonnaise dialect first published in 1894 has been continuously in print for more than 100 years.

He also wrote the novel Histoire d'André in 1867, a large volume of poetry titled Pauca Paucis in 1889, and a collection of memoires he called Au hasard de la pensée in 1895.

== See also ==
- Franco-Provençal language
