= École nationale supérieure d'architecture de Paris-La Villette =

Coordinates: 48°53′37″N 02°22′52″E

National Higher Architecture School of Paris-La Villette
- École nationale supérieure d'architecture de Paris-La Villette
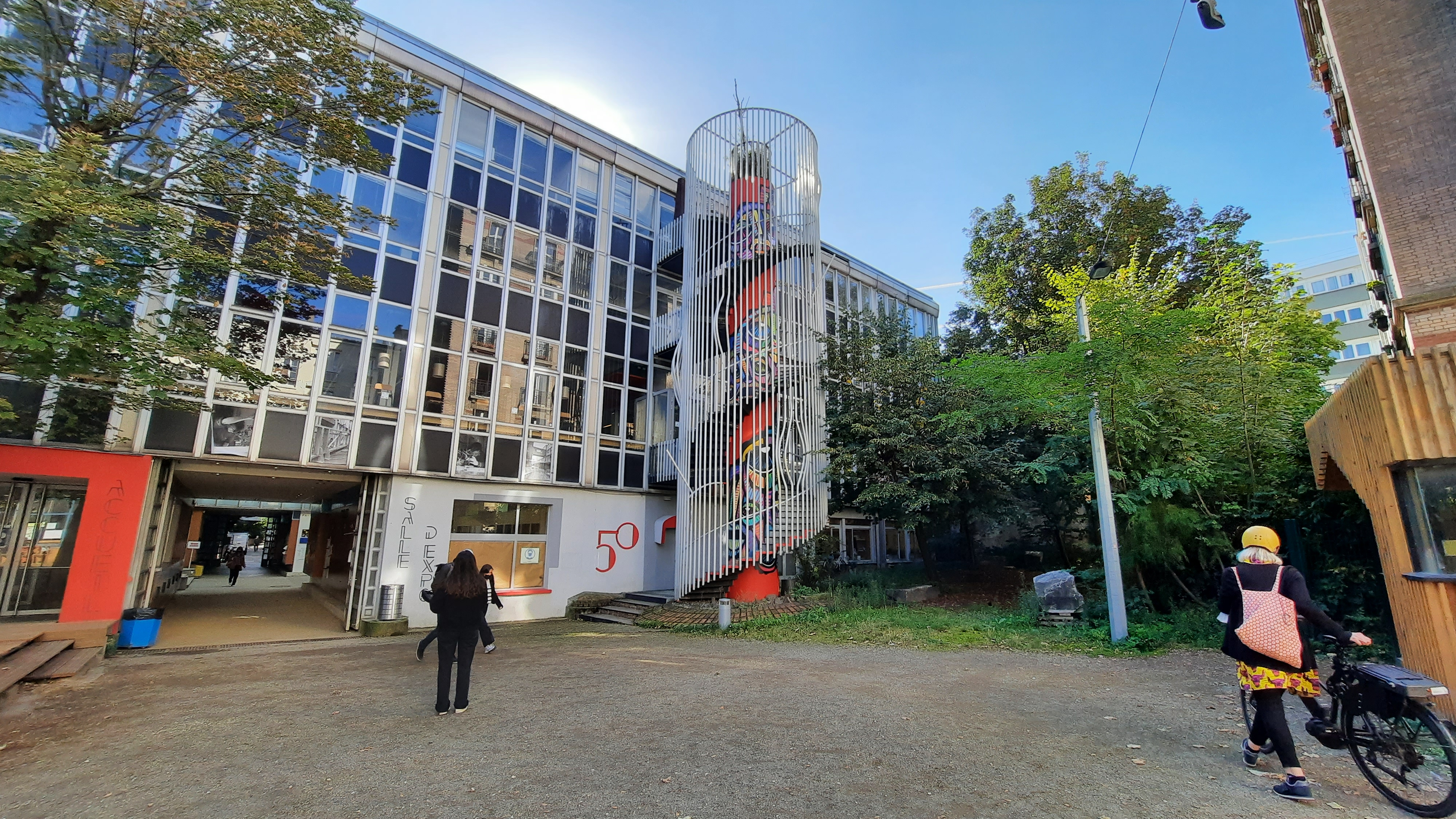
- Main building
- Type: Public
- Established: 1969
- President: Caroline Lecourtois
- Students: 2290
- Location: Paris, France
- Campus: Urban

The École nationale supérieure d'architecture de Paris-La Villette is a public tertiary school located in Paris, France. It is placed under the supervision of the ministry for the Culture and the Communication (Direction of Architecture and the Inheritance). It is one of the twenty public schools which exempt a higher education of architecture in France.

The Georgia Institute of Technology College of Architecture (in the United States) maintains a small permanent presence at the school.

== People ==
Nicolas Godin from the French electro band Air was architecture student of the École nationale supérieure d'architecture de Paris la Villette.
