= Auguste Louzier Sainte-Anne =

French architect

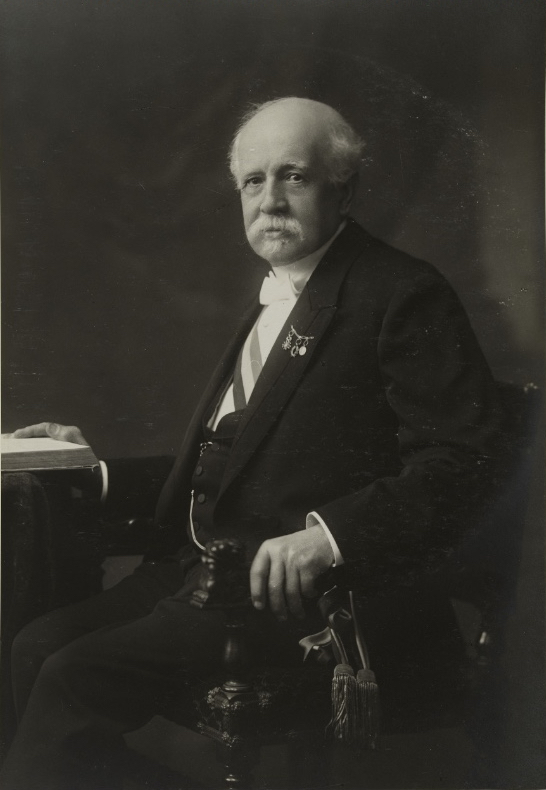
Photograph of Auguste Louzier

Auguste Louzier Sainte-Anne (2 December 1848–27 February 1925) was a French architect.
