= Yong He Yuan =

- 雍河院
- Interactive map of the Yong He Yuan area

General information
- Type: Residential
- Location: Taipei, Taiwan
- Coordinates: 25°0′49″N 121°30′41″E
- Construction started: 2009
- Completed: 2012

Height
- Roof: 87 m (285.4 ft)

Technical details
- Floor count: 25
- Floor area: 27,000 m^{2} (290,626 sq ft)

Design and construction
- Architect: Florent Nédélec
- Developer: Dahin Development

Yong He Yuan (Chinese: 雍河院; pinyin: Yōng Hé Yuàn) is a complex of two residential towers designed by Florent Nédélec and located in Taipei, Taiwan.

== Design ==
The Yong He Yuan Residences has a unique design that incorporates a woven pattern throughout the facades of the towers. The pattern is made of a series of light stripped grey granites and dark aluminum panels. The facades incorporate large square windows in between the interlaced horizontal and vertical elements of the pattern and are generously recessed to provide additional shading and protection from the sun. The luxury amenities include, gym, landscape terraces, swimming pool, under-ground parking garage, and retails.

== See also ==
- Florent Nédélec
- The Jervois
