= Hôtel Alexandre =

Hôtel particulier in Paris, France

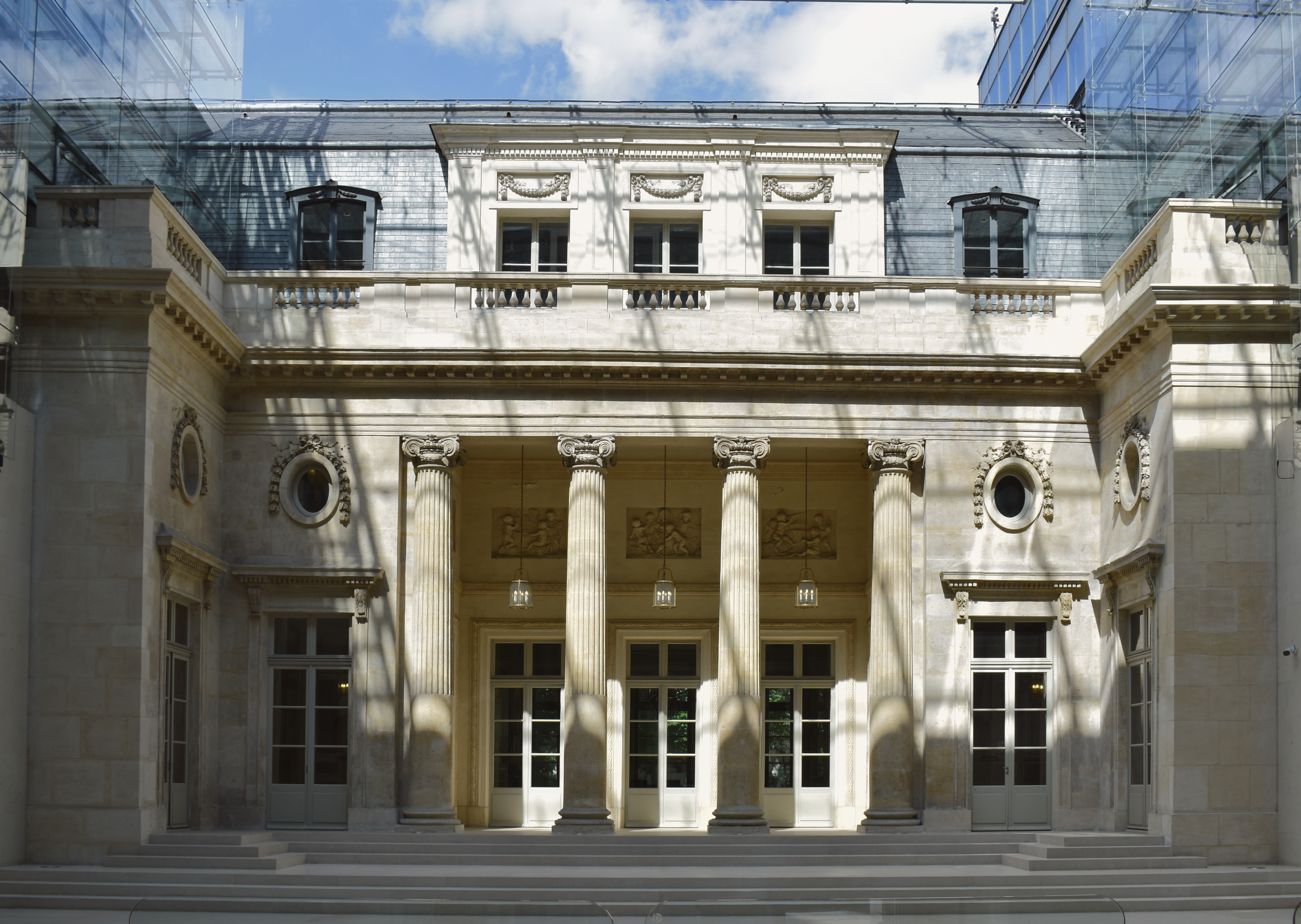
- Interactive map of the Hôtel Alexandre area

General information
- Location: Paris, France, 16 rue de la Ville-l'Évêque

Design and construction
- Architect: Étienne-Louis Boullée

Monument historique
- Designated: 4 November 1927
- Reference no.: PA00088866

The Hôtel Alexandre (French pronunciation: [otɛl alɛksɑ̃dʁ]), also known as the Hôtel Soult, is an hôtel particulier in the 8th arrondissement of Paris, designed by French architect Étienne-Louis Boullée. The building was constructed from 1763 to 1766 and is the best surviving structure designed by Boullée.

== History ==
=== Construction ===
The hôtel particulier was commissioned by André-Claude-Nicolas Alexandre, a French financer. Boullée began designing the building at age 35, making it one of his earliest projects.

A mansard roof was later added to the building, replacing its original rooftop terrace.

=== Heritage designation ===
The building was listed as a Monument historique on 4 November 1927.

=== 2001 addition ===
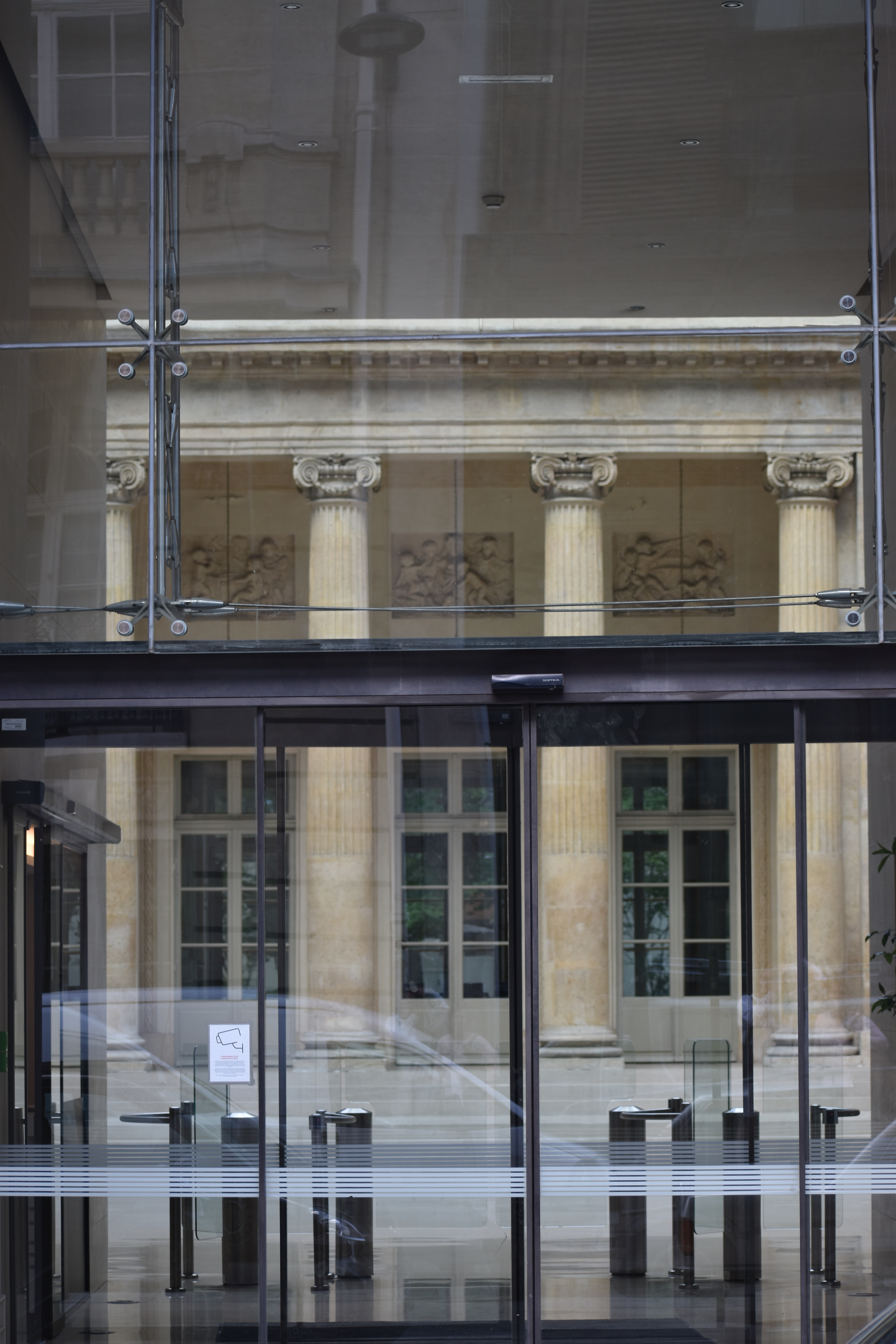
The building as seen through doorway of the 2001 addition

In 2001 the building was incorporated into the atrium of a contemporary office building designed by Delaage Tsiropoulos Architecture Carvunis Cholet to serve as the headquarters of Suez.

== Gallery ==
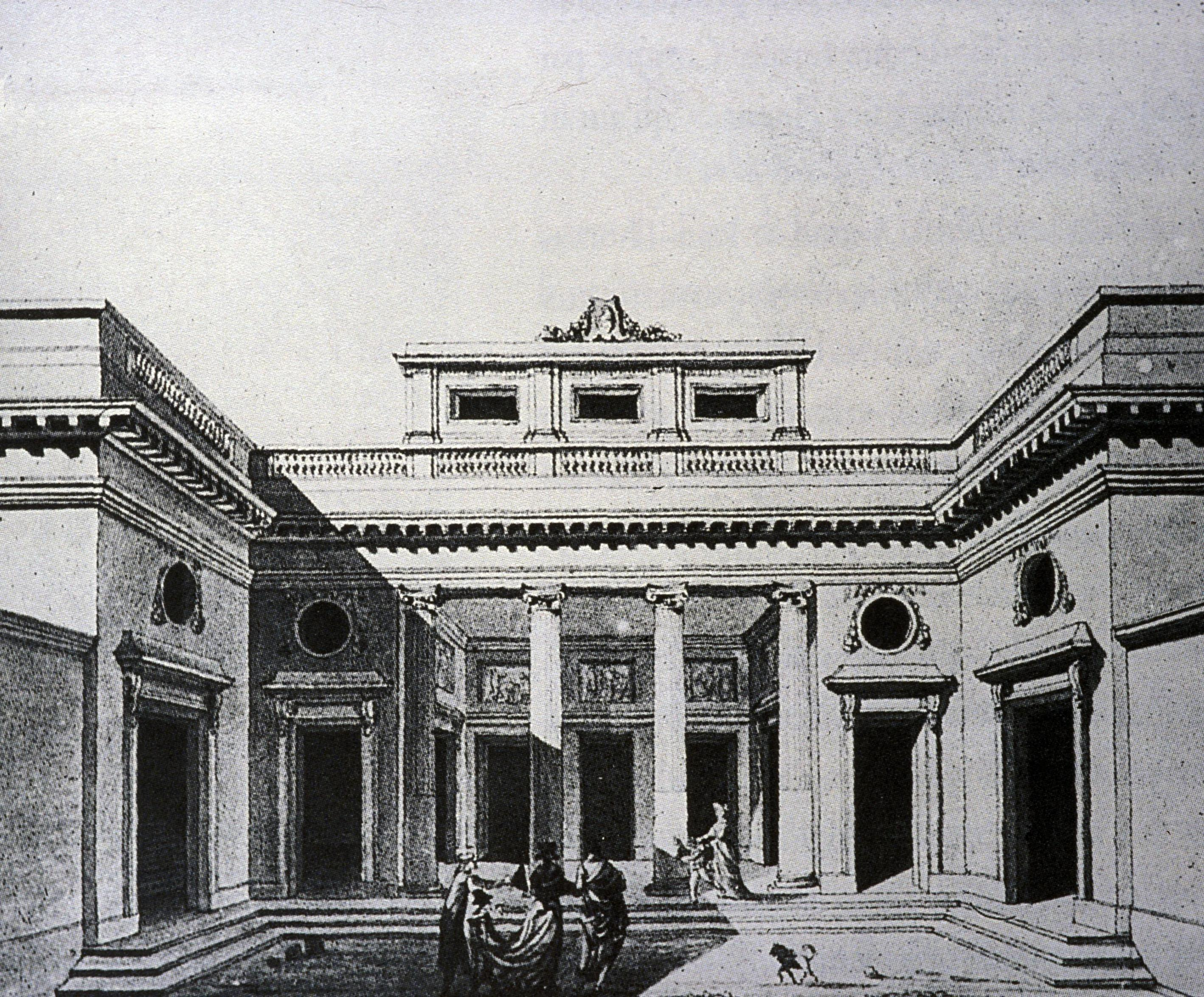
Boullée's drawing of Hotel Alexandre

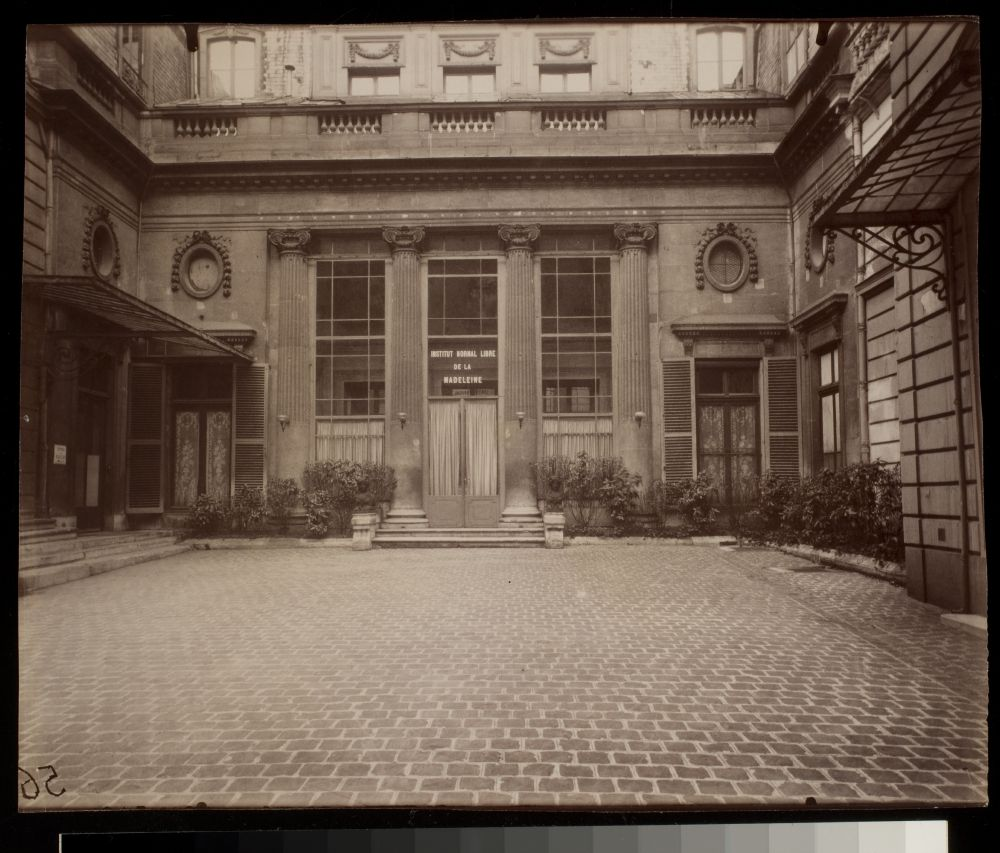
1909 photograph of the building by Eugène Atget

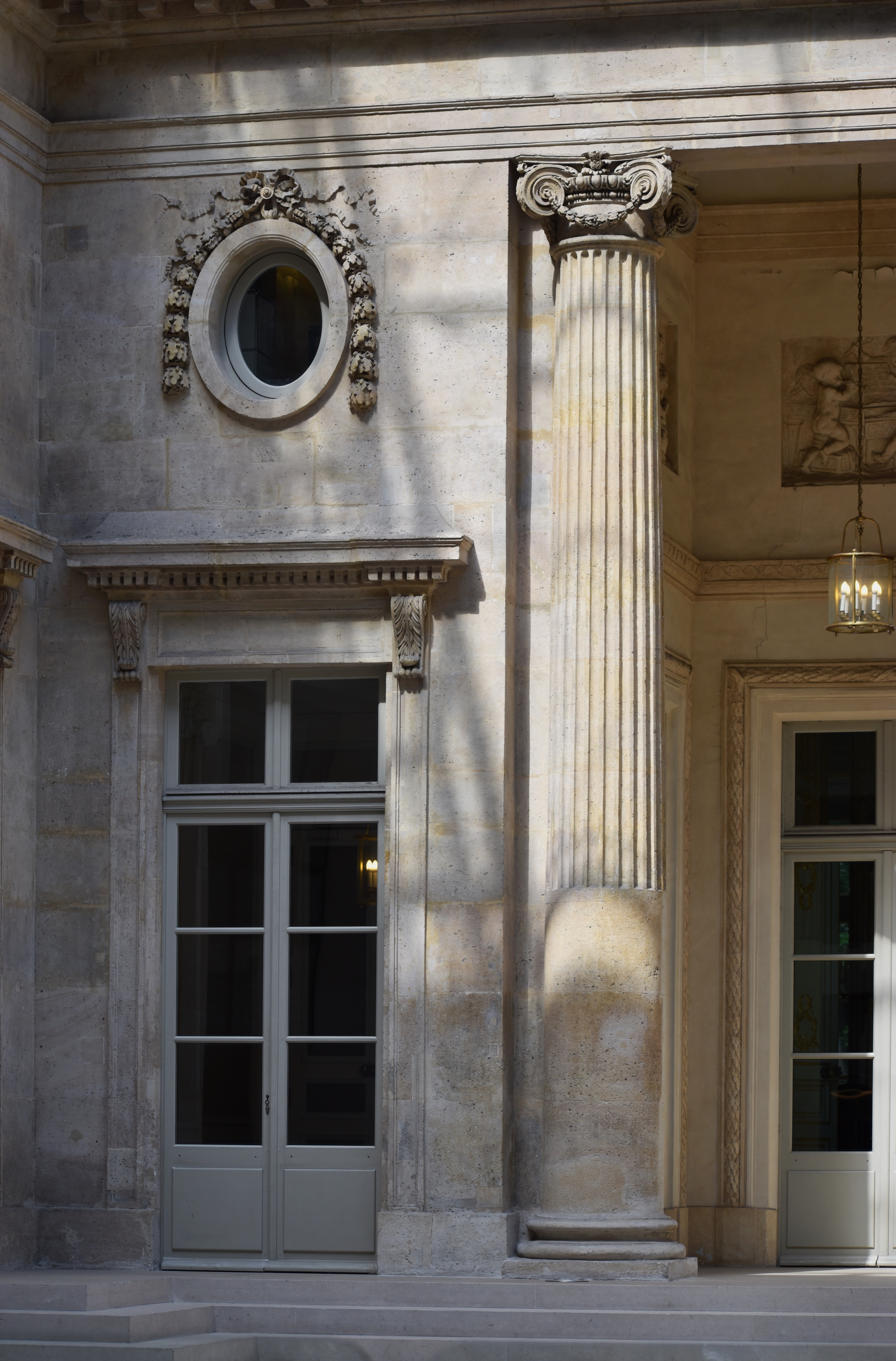
Detail of the building's facade
