= Église du Bon-Pasteur =

Roman Catholic church in Lyon, France

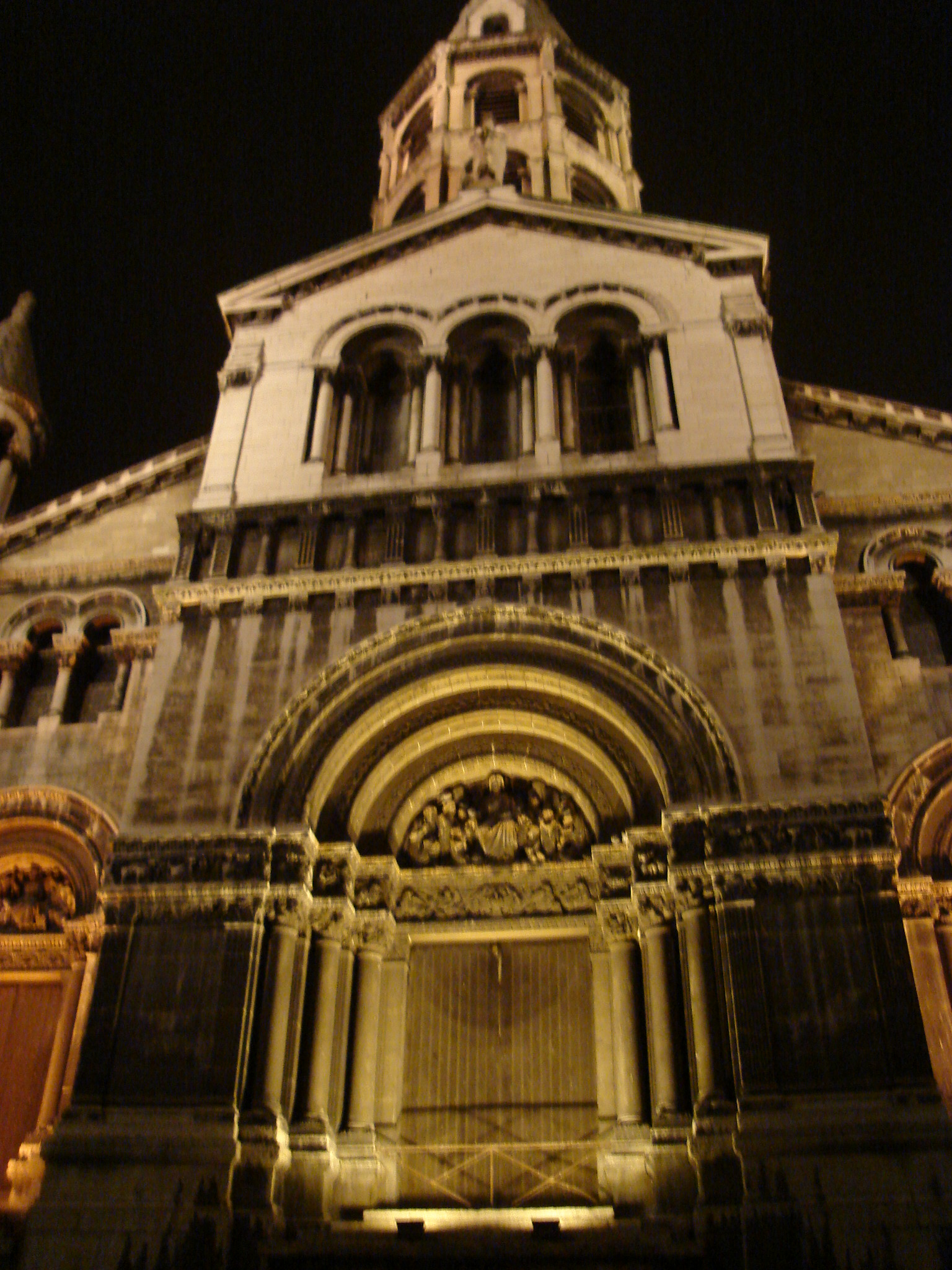
- Église du Bon-Pasteur

Religion
- Affiliation: Roman Catholic Church
- Diocese: 1st arrondissement of Lyon
- Ecclesiastical or organizational status: Cathedral

Location
- Location: Lyon, France
- Interactive map of Église du Bon-Pasteur
- Coordinates: 45.771694°N 4.829999°E

Architecture
- Architect: Clair Tisseur
- Type: Church
- Style: Poitevin Roman
- Completed: 1883

The Église du Bon-Pasteur (French pronunciation: [eɡliz dy bɔ̃ pastœʁ]) is a Roman Catholic church located at rue Neyret on the slopes of La Croix-Rousse, near the montée de la Grande Côte, in the 1st arrondissement of Lyon. Cardinal Barbarin described the church as "highly symbolic for Lyon Christians".

== History ==
The parish was founded by Cardinal de Bonald in 1855. Then the priest Callot opened a little church on this place on 16 March 1856 as Napoleon III and his wife had said they will adopt as godparents all children born that day. Thus, Callot wrote them a letter asking them to adopt his church. On 29 March 1856, an imperial decree legally recognized the Parish of the Bon Pasteur.

In 1869, Emperor Napoleon III came to Lyon to start to build the church. The work, performed by Clair Tisseur, began on 25 August 1869, but the war interrupted his work.

The current church was built between 1875-1883 by Lyon architect Clair Tisseur. The City Council provided 400,000 francs for the construction. However, his plans were not fully respected, because the Father Durant, who presided over the church then, wanted a higher tower. The church was open to the faithful on 15 June 1879 and was completed and consecrated by Archbishop Caverot on 11 June 1883.

When the church was constructed, Roman tiles laid flat over a pile of animal bones were discovered.

== Architecture ==
The architecture of the church is an imitation of Poitevin Romanesque style.

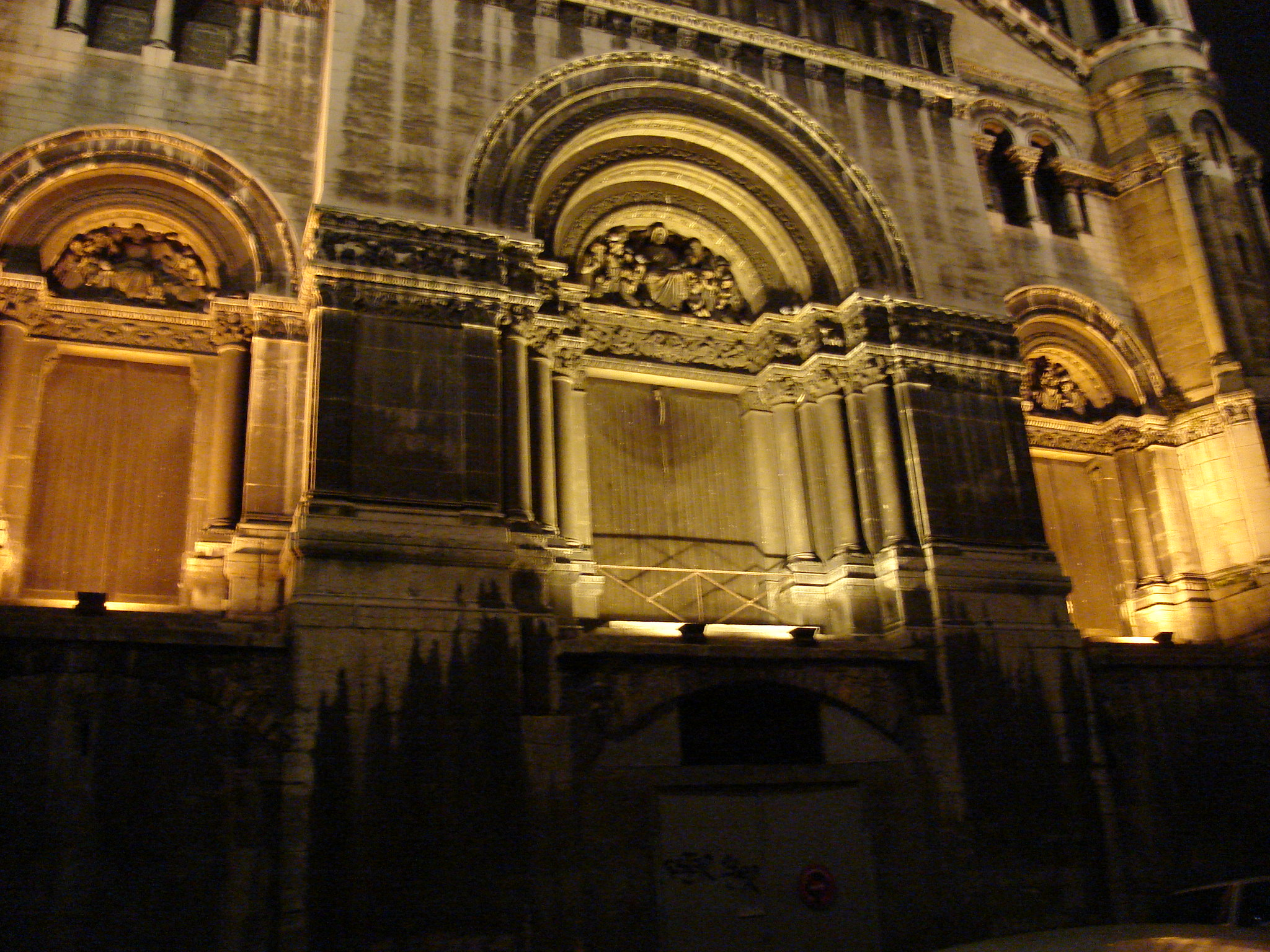
An inaccessible church

The church is characterized by its inaccessibility : there is not parvise, the door leading to the rue Neyret, more than three meters above the ground. The staircase scheduled was never built because it would have required the demolition of the barracks on the other side of the street, what anticlericalism of the 3rd Republic could not tolerate.

The stained glasses were made by Bégule and the paintings by Tony Trollet.

== Today ==
In 1984, the church was no longer assigned to the Catholic church. It was used as a showroom by the École nationale des beaux-arts de Lyon established in the vicinity until 2008, and students did not clean the church when they moved. Then the building has been regularly squatted, much degraded and desecrated. Priest Michel Durand, who served in the church, said it needs a deep renovation and wanted the Lyon mayor participated in the works.

In 2010, the church was the subject of a dispute between residents and the mayor about the installation of antennas unwanted by local residents, who decided to protest.
