= The Jervois =

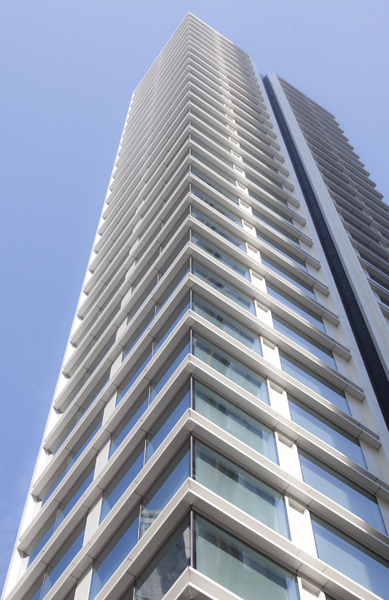
- The Jervois in 2012
- Interactive map of the The Jervois area

General information
- Status: Completed
- Type: Hotel
- Location: Sheung Wan, Hong Kong
- Coordinates: 22°17′7″N 114°9′2″E
- Construction started: 2008
- Completed: 2011
- Opening: 2011 (Hotel), 2012 (Restaurant)

Height
- Roof: 118 m (387.1 ft)

Technical details
- Floor count: 35
- Floor area: 4,300 m^{2} (46,285 sq ft)

Design and construction
- Architect: Florent Nédélec
- Developer: National Properties

The Jervois is a 35-storey tower designed by Florent Nédélec and located on 89 Jervois Street in Sheung Wan, Victoria, Hong Kong.

== Description ==
The Jervois is a luxurious boutique hotel that combines a total of 49 suites. All suites are only accessible via private lift lobbies and feature floor to ceiling windows that offer views of Hong Kong. Typical floors have two suites per floor with double corner windows while the top five floor have only one suite per floor with 360 degrees views of Victoria Harbour, Hong Kong Central and Victoria Peak.

== Design ==
The Jervois boutique hotel is a collaborative creation of two French designers, architect Florent Nédélec for the architectural design and furniture maker Christian Liaigre for the Interior decoration.

== See also ==
- Yong He Yuan
