= Philippe Neerman =

Belgian industrial designer

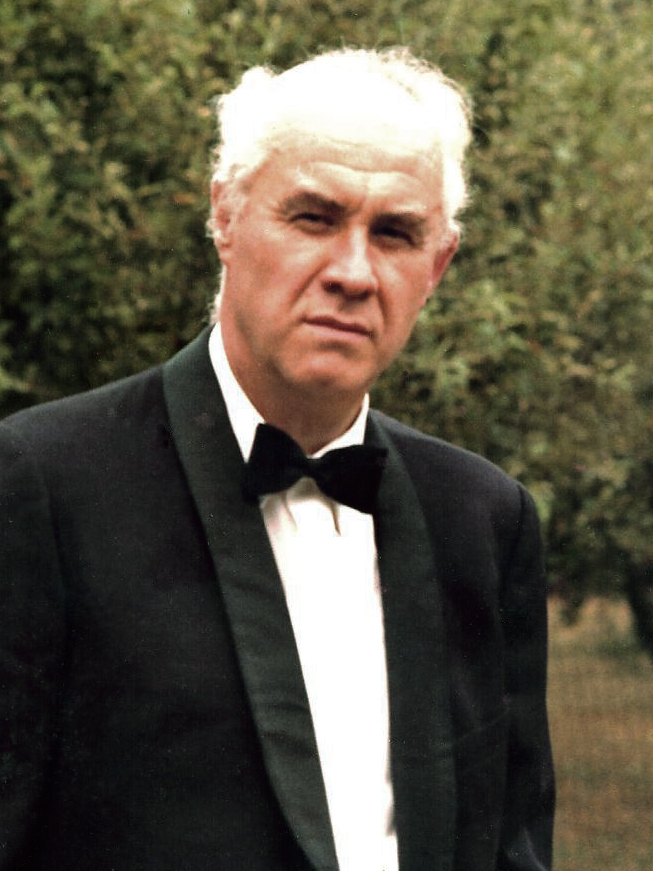
- Born: 27 May 1930; Belgian Congo
- Died: 6 June 2011 (aged 81)
- Occupation: Architect
- Awards: Goid sign-First prize of the Triennale de milano.; Design Vlaanderen 1999 Career Award

Philippe Neerman (1930–2011) was a Belgian industrial designer and President of Industrial Design Planning Office Philippe Neerman & Co. N.V.\S.A. He was known for his application of ergonomics in public transportation systems and his work on major projects such as the Royal Library of Belgium, the Royal Castle of Laeken, and the Royal Palace of Brussels. He also participated in the international Design Biennale Interieur in Courtray, Belgium. He mainly focused on transportation and made designs for metros and trams including the Euro Tram, the Brussels Metro, and the Metro in Barcelona. His work has been incorporated into a diverse collection of museums, including the Ghent Design Museum.

== Early life ==
Neerman was born in 1930 in the Belgian Congo to a Belgian father and a French mother. He grew up in Brussels in an artistic family but made many trips to France during his childhood, including during the World War II era. In Ghent, Belgium, he studied interior design, furniture design and management.

== Career ==
Neerman graduated from L'École de la Cambre in 1953. After his studies, Neerman moved to Kortrijk, where he worked for a company named De Coene, a Belgian art decore and design firm. He was involved with setting up the Brussels Design Centre after beginning his work with De Coene and claims to be the originator of the centre. As he indicated himself in the mid-1950s, several fellow designers were won over to the goal of having a Brussels-based DC. During the end of his career at De Coene, he designed the Philips Chair for the company's home office in Eindhoven. He was commissioned in 1955 by the Belgian Ministry of Economic Affairs to set up the Institute of Industrial Aesthetics and the Design Centre.

Neerman created his own company in 1967 and was among the first European industrial designers to adapt ergonomic studies to the design of public transportation while working on projects such as the Metro of Brussels, and the Metro of Lyons & Marseille. After working on numerous transportation system projects, he began to concentrate on different transportation systems such as buses, trains, people movers, and tramways. During that time, he also focused on interior and furniture design for different buildings.

Neerman was a professor at the National Higher Institute of Architecture and Urbanism in Antwerp until 1995.

=== Career history ===
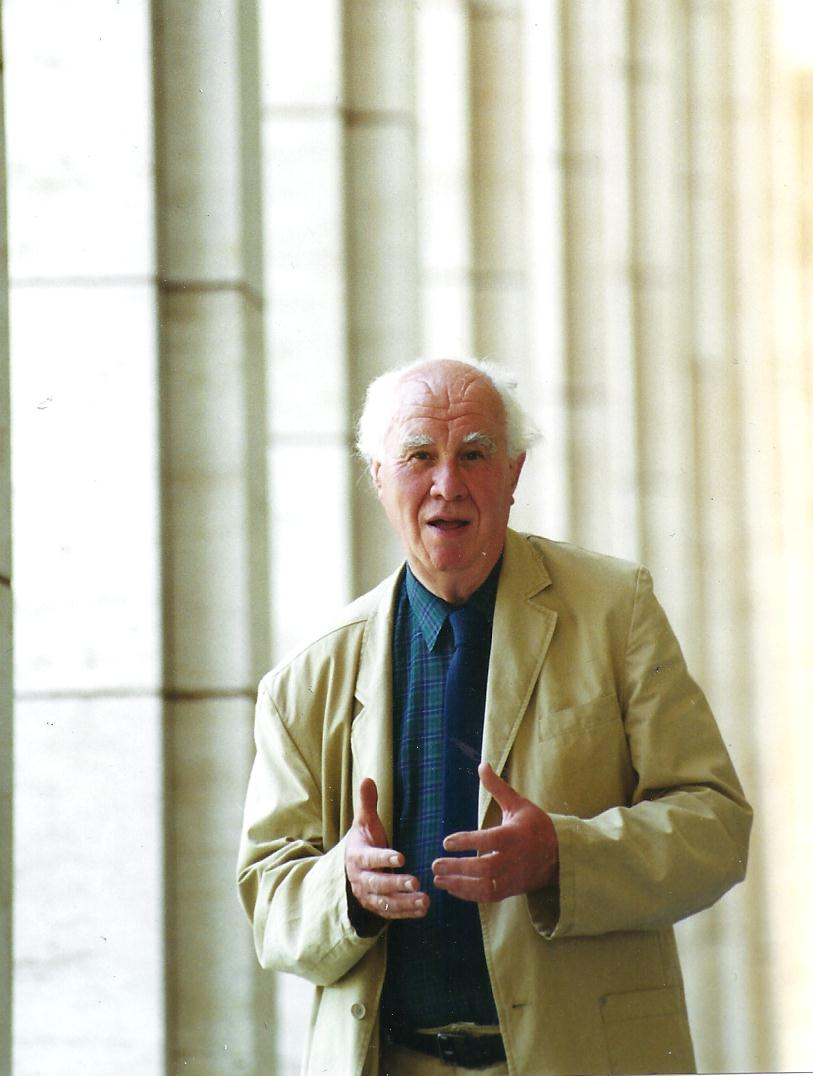
Philippe Neerman

- 1953–54: Collaborator, Mobilier Universel Jules Wabbes (Brussels)
- 1954–62: Plant manager, SAIB De Coene et Freres N.V., Courtray;
- 1962–67: Project manager, SAIB De Coene et Freres N.V.,(Courtray)
- 1966–73: Lecturer, Institut National Superieur d'Architecture et des Arts Visuels, Brussels;
- 1972: Professor, Nationaal Hoger Instituut voor Bouwkunst en Stedebouw, Antwerpen;
- 1972: Lecturer, University of Lille, Compiegne, Pretoria;
- 1967–70:Private office;
- 1970–86: Counciller, Industrial Design Planning Office, Philippe Neerman & Co pvba\sprl, Courtray;
- 1986-: President, Industrial Design Planning Office, Philippe Neerman & Co N.V.\S.A., Courtray

=== Notable works ===
- Royal Library of Belgium;
- Institut royal du patrimoine artistique;
- Royal Castle of Laeken,
- Royal Palace of Brussels;
- The I.M.C.A.G. in Charleroi;
- Royal Museum for Central Africa;
- Rolling stock on rails:-Brusame
- Light rail vehicles:- Nantes, Grenoble, Strasbourg, Orléans streetcar,
- Hydraulic power stations
- Centralized operating centers, control towers.
- Furniture design

== Publications ==
Neerman's works have been incorporated in different publications such as journals and books, including the le Soir, Tram, and Bouwen voor de natie.

1. Callico, Catherine (August 2000). "Neerman dans le métro". le Soir 30: 26.
2. Binst, Jean-Marie (December 2000). "The Metro, and beyond". Tram 81 30: 20.
3. "The Metro, and beyond". Tram 81 30: 20. December 2000.
4. L'Année du Tram. Strasbourg: Les Editions&Ronald Hirle. 1994. pp. 182–193.ISBN 2-910048-15-2.
5. Anna Albano, Paola Ranzini; Edith Doove (June 2000). Dynamic City. Brussels: Skira/Seuil. pp. 83–90. ISBN 88-8118-771-X.
6. Bouwen voor de natie. Gent: Academia Press. 2012. pp. 183–199. ISBN 978-90-38218991.
7. Chery, François (August 1996). "Tramway" Penser le futur 310: 41–43.
8. Dinarich, Mario (September 1989). "Design research and cooperation of the undergrounds of Marseille and Lyon". Transport design forum 158:114–120.
9. Maes, Guido(March 1999). "Citadis tramway lyon 1997".Iconen van design in Vlaanderen 167: 62–63
10. Le stylo à bille Le design. Le tramway de strasbourg le confort dans la ville. 1998.pp. 52–55.ISBN 2-86656-193-7
11. Febvre, Jacqueline; Isabelle Monier (September 1999). I.D.P.O.-Neerman Consulting. Paris: A.P.C.I. pp. 104–105. ISBN 2 86227 158 6.
12. Febvre, Jacqueline; Isabelle Monier (September 2001). I.D.P.O.-Neerman Consulting. Paris: A.P.C.I. pp. 104–105. ISBN 2 86227 256 6.

== Gallery ==
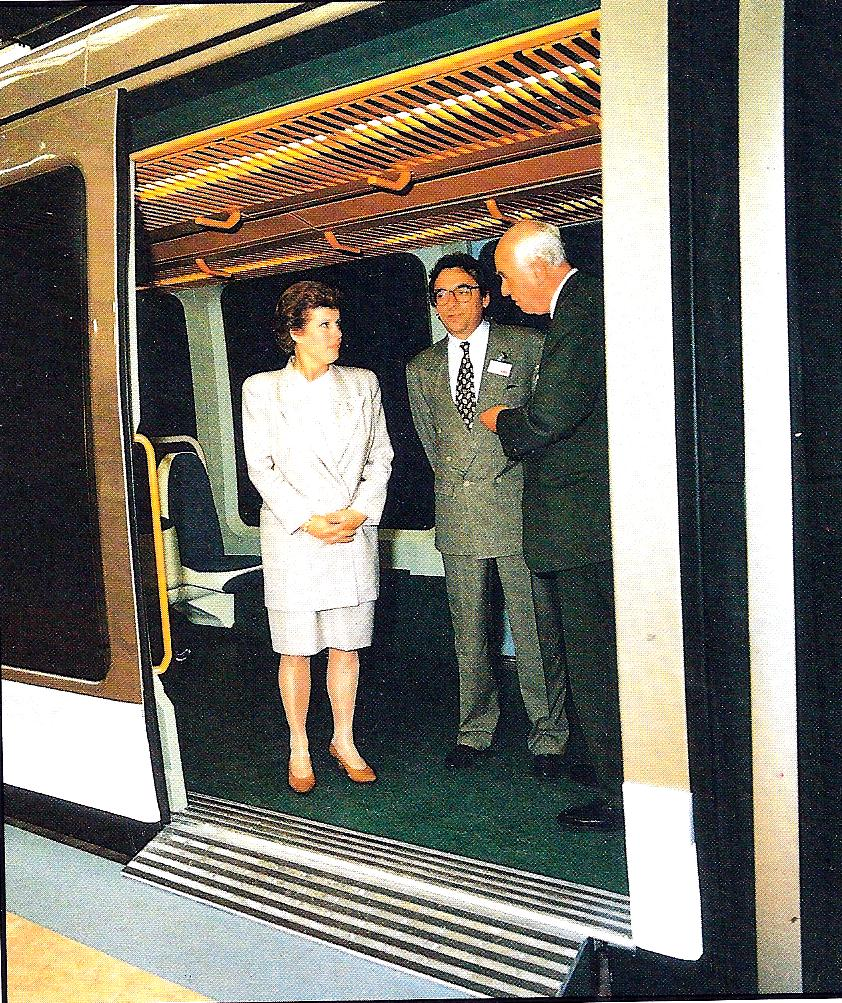
Philippe Neerman

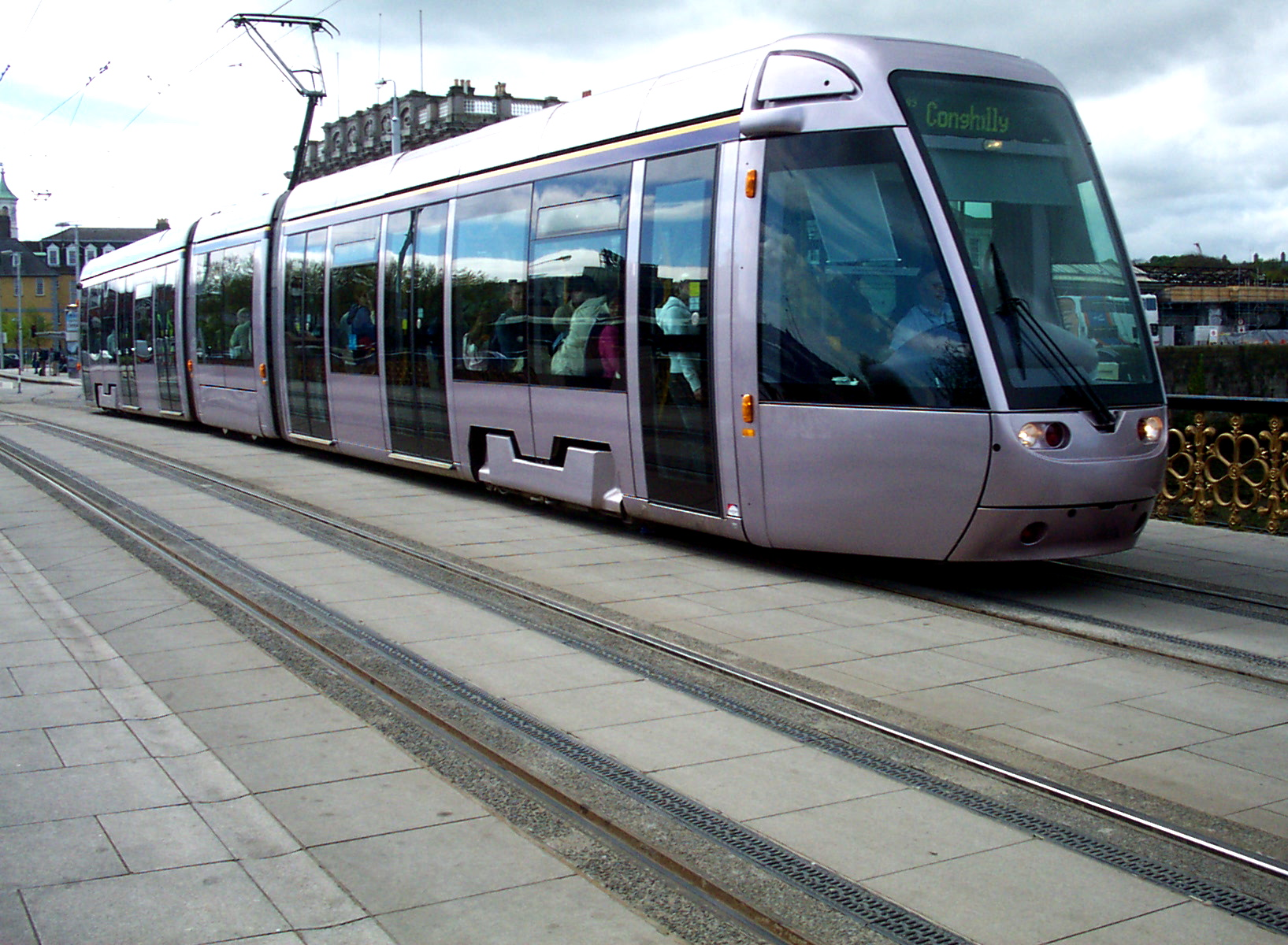
Citadis Dublin

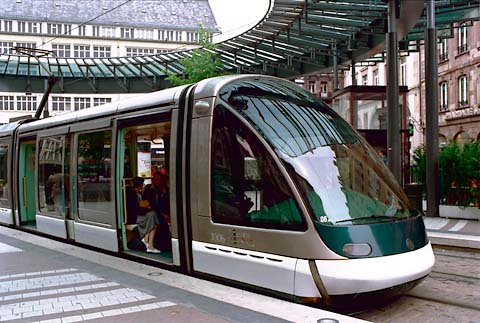
Tramway of Strasbourg

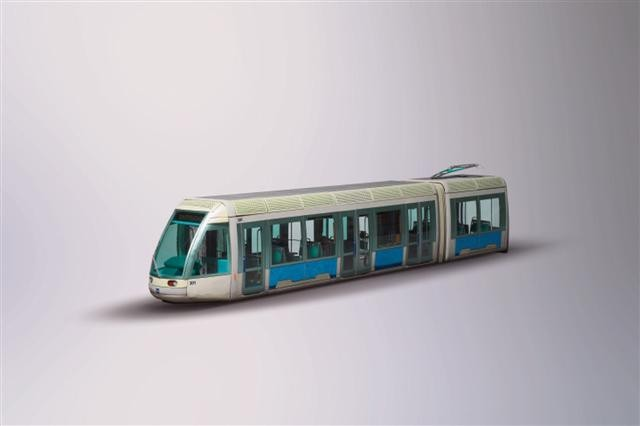
Tramway of Montpellier(France)

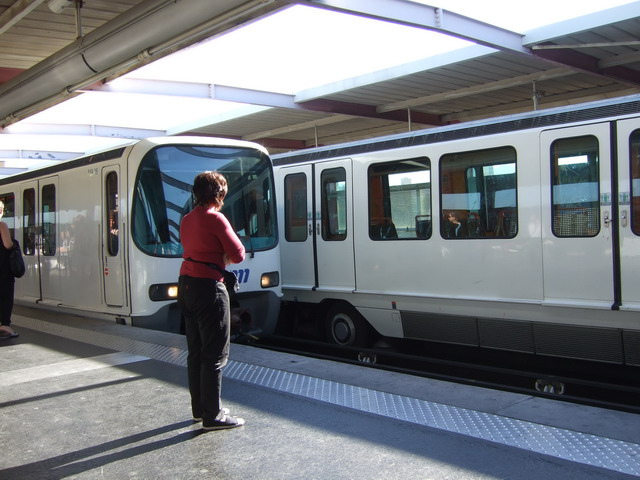
Metro of Marseille

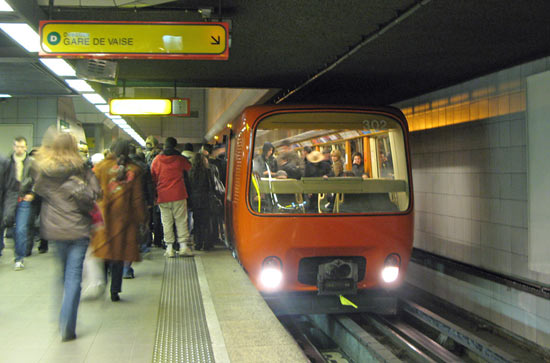
Metro of Lyons

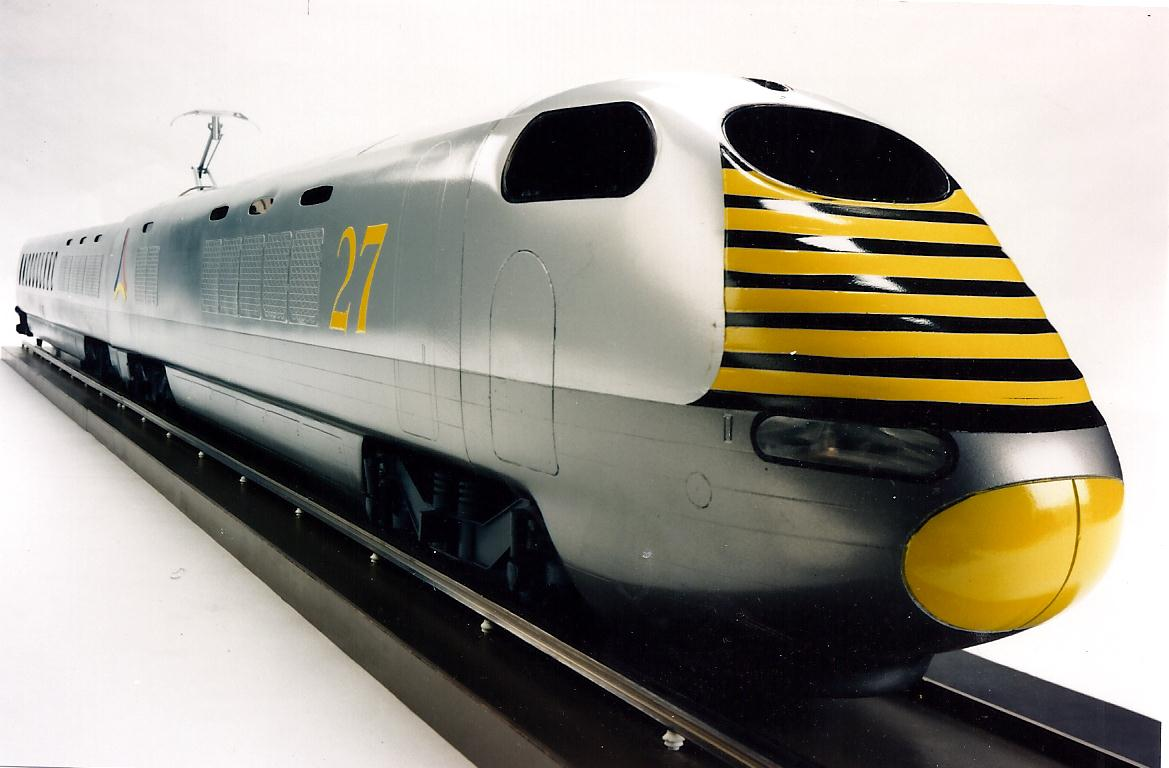
TGV train

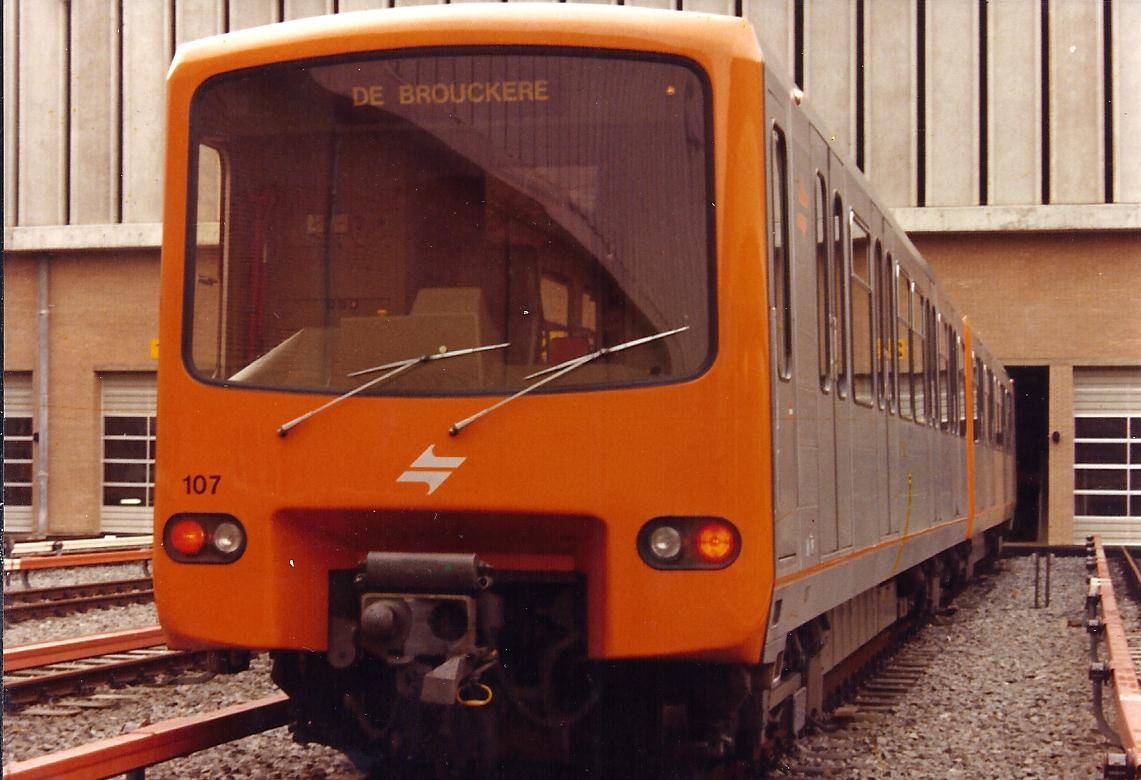
Metro of Brussels

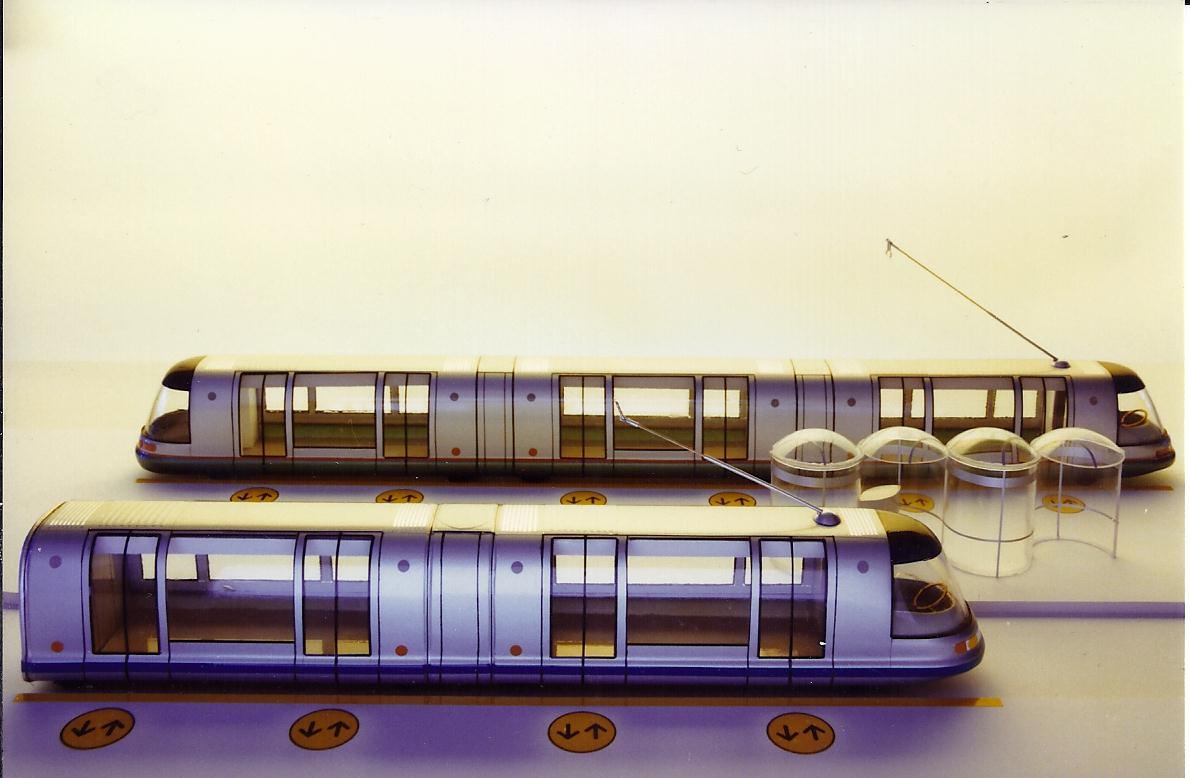
New generation trolley bus Lyon

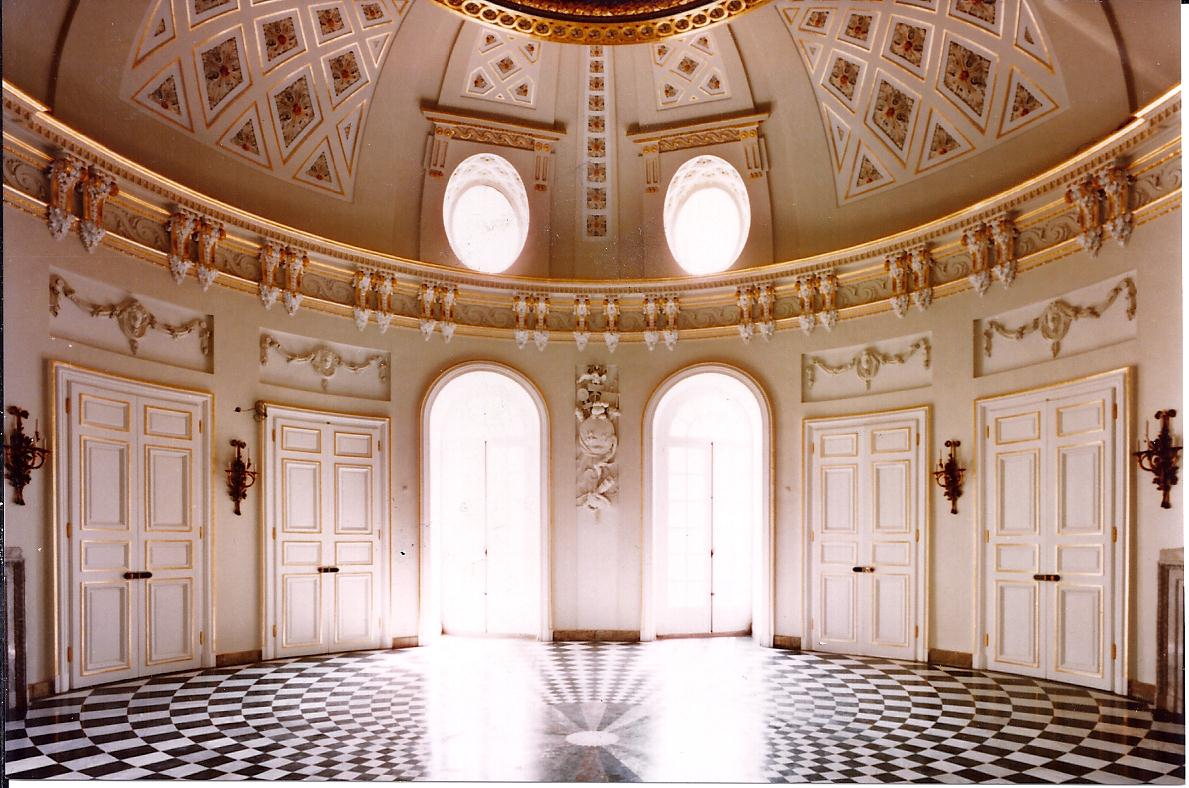
Appartements of Charles de Lorraine

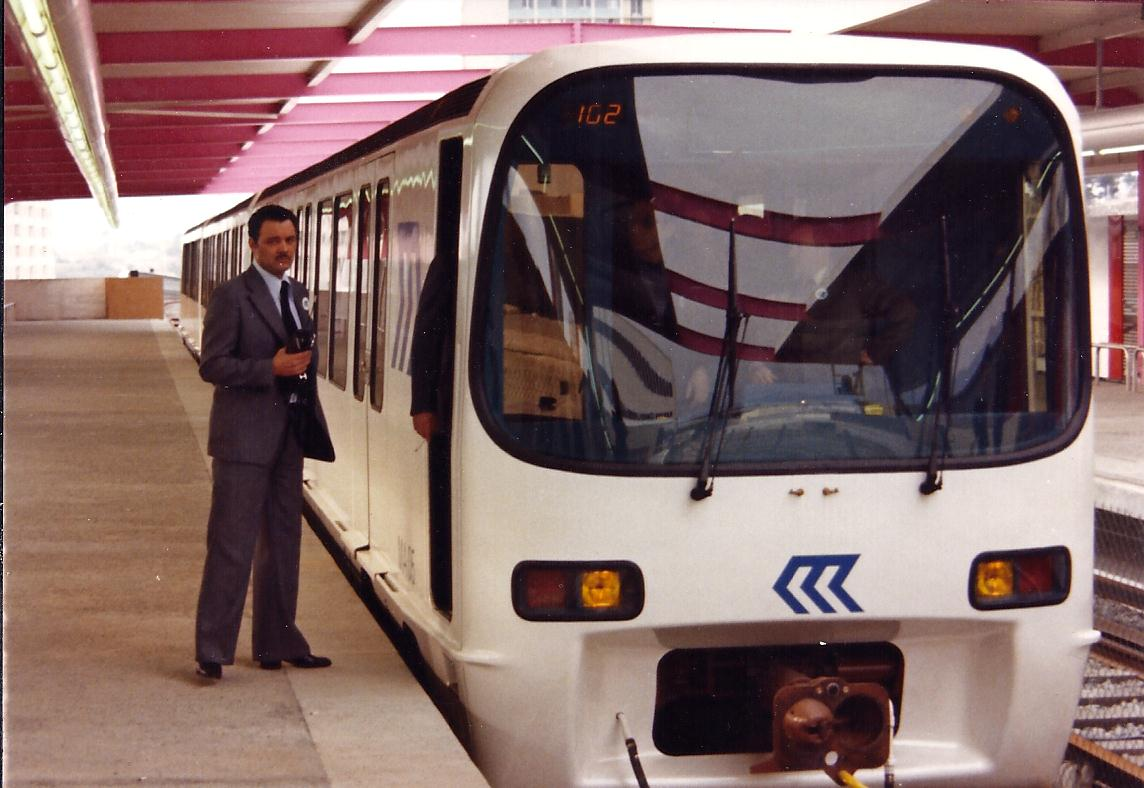
Metro of Marseille

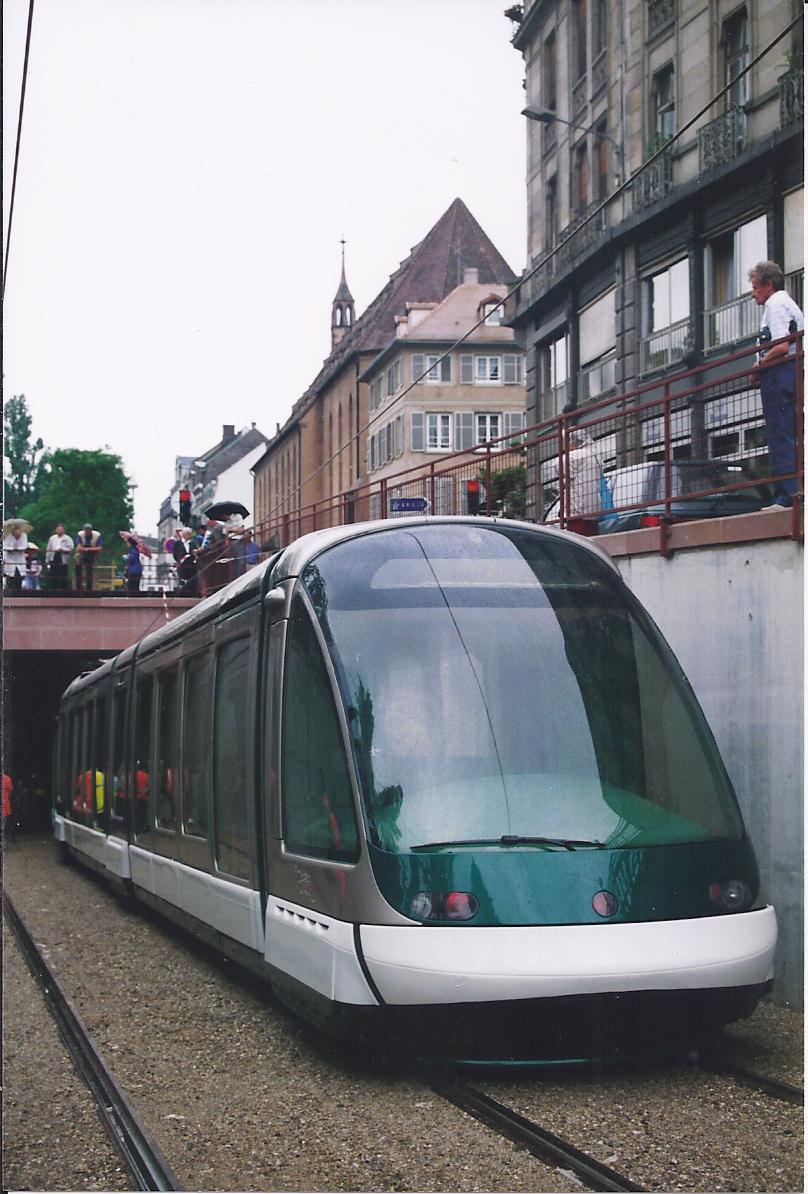
Tramway of Strasbourg

== Personal life ==
Neerman married Denise Kinet in 1952 and had 2 sons, Olivier Neerman and Johan Neerman. Johan took over the family business in 1999.
