= Johan Neerman =

Belgian architect (born 1959)

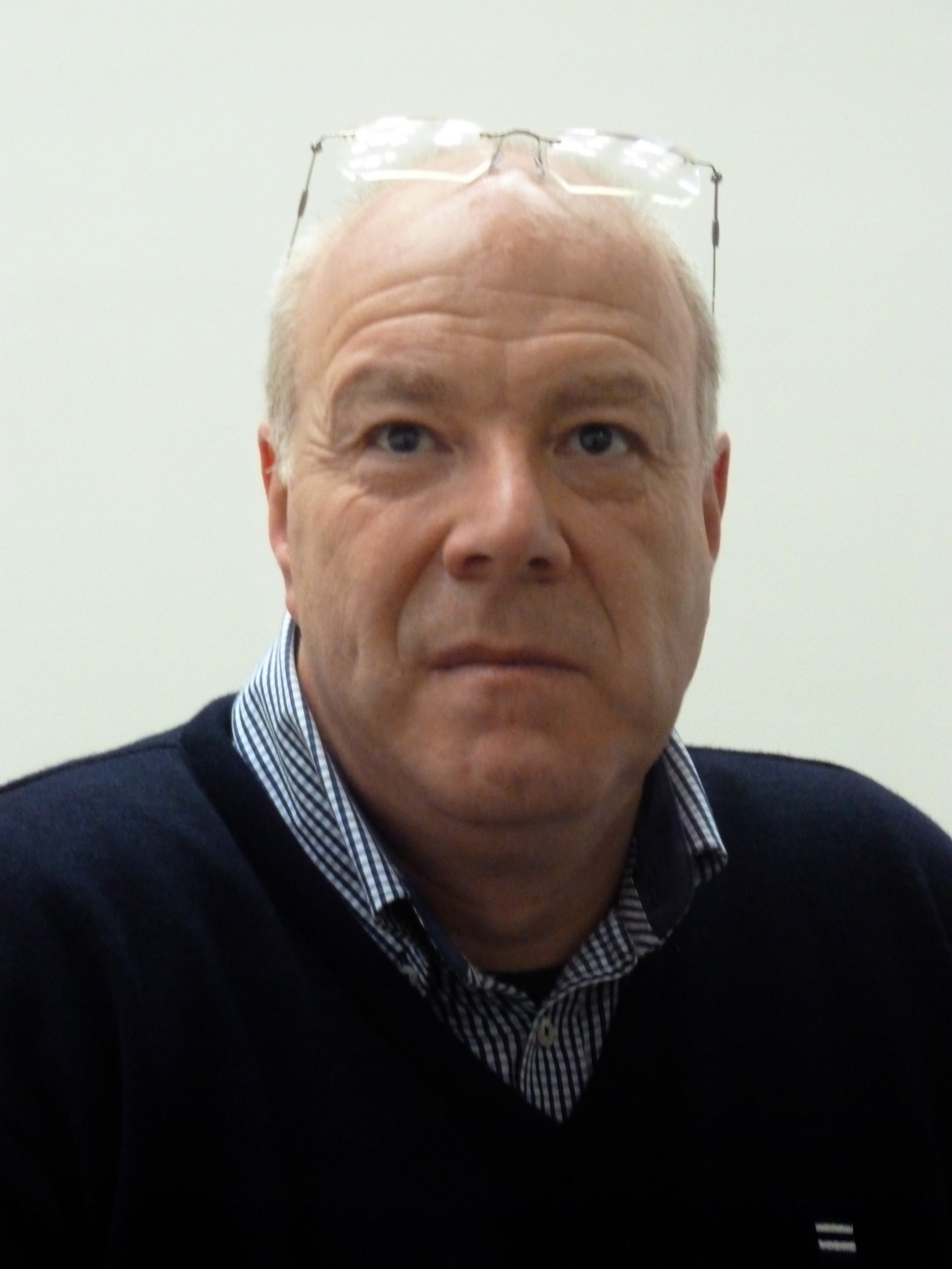
- Born: 24 May 1959 (age 67); Kortrijk, Belgium
- Education: Wharton School of the University of Pennsylvania, Ph.D. Social Sciences
- Occupation: Architect
- Awards: First prize in the West Flanders Industrial Design competition; Municipality of Brussels Award for Excellence; Prize of Edouard François; Industrial Forum Design

Johan Neerman (born 24 May 1959) is a Belgian architect, industrial designer and systems thinker. He works with naval architecture, appropriate technology, transport design, cultural concepts and arts, systems thinking.

== Early life ==
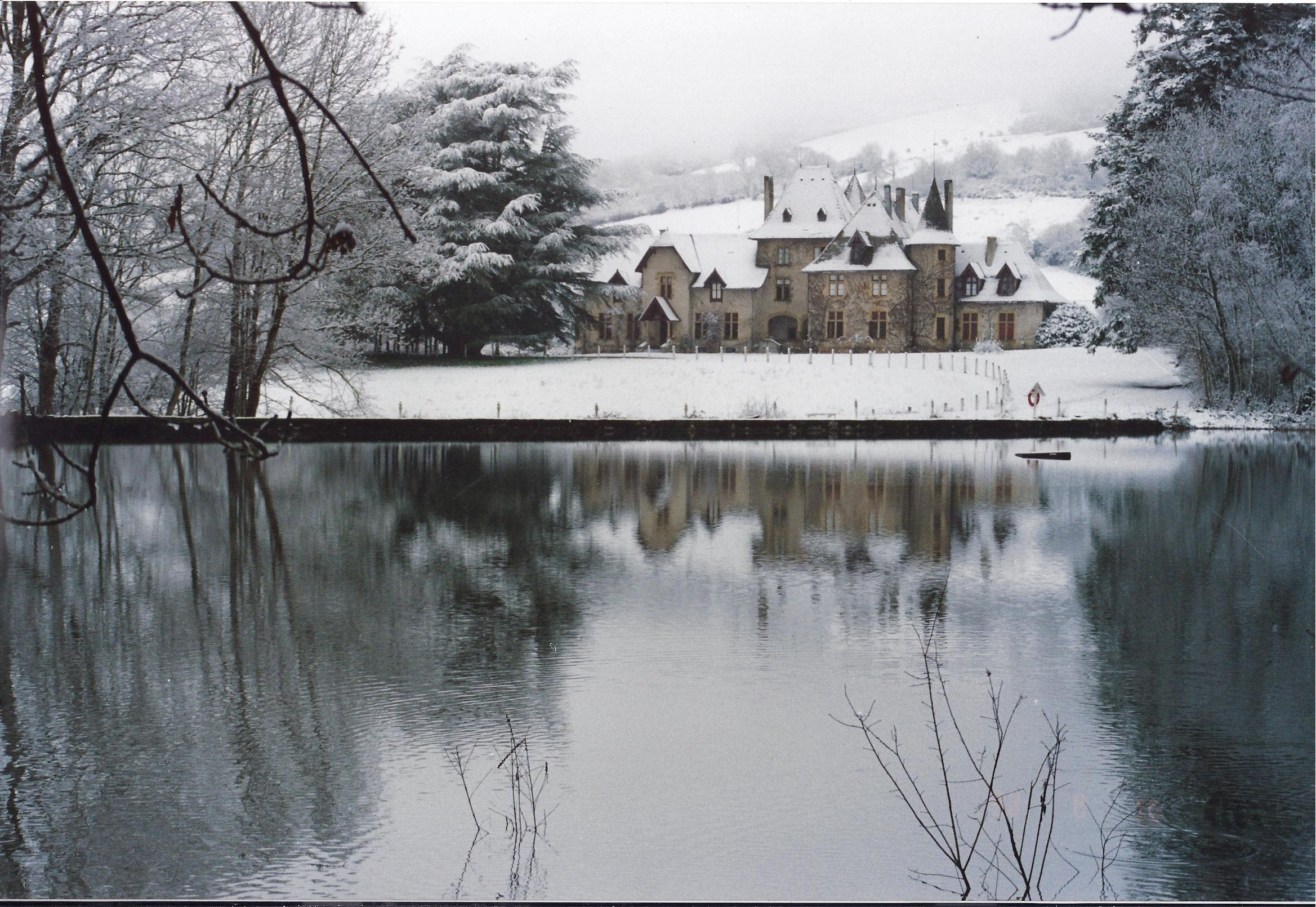
Johan Neerman, Château de Pierrefitte

Johan Neerman was born in 1959 in Kortrijk, Belgium. His father, Philippe Neerman, was Belgian industrial designer. Neerman studied architecture at the Institut Supérieur d'Architecture Victor Horta in Brussels (1980–1985). During his studies he did a thesis on applied systems theory with Professor Paul Tahon, ergonomist. He joined the Kiyonori Kikutake office in Tokyo in 1985 and after 1 year joined the army and went to the United States. There he studied at Wharton School of the University of Pennsylvania. He studied Social Systems Sciences under the guidance of Professor Hasan Ozbekhan. During those years he focused on Chaos Theory. He worked on his research with Michele Sanglier and Ilya Prigogine.

== Experience ==
Worked on architectural and transport systems projects with IDPO Ph Neerman. After in 1999 he took over family business. Neerman is a member of organizations: the Scientific committee of ISD Valenciennes, FIA, BBCBC, Brussels Town Planning Federation (FBU) and the UDB. He has been teaching as a professor at the Academy of Fine Arts in Belarus in 2000. Johan Neerman worked on wide variety of projects from transport systems to naval architecture. In 1995 he totally renovate Château de Pierrefitte and all included buildings. His next project was the Poil Municipality.

== Transport systems ==
He joined the family design office, IDPO Ph Neerman, from 1992. Worked on a cable-pulled system (SK), for Aéroport de Paris with Paul Andreu and the Citadis tram range Alstom Citadis. From 1995 until 1998 he worked on upgrading of the Brussels Metro fifth generation vehicles. Neerman directed the partnership with Breda-Firema, the creation of the double-decker coaches (M6 types) for the SNCB Competition. He participated in the RATP competition for the MF 2000. He later participated in the Barcelona concept and took out a patent for design. Johan Neerman worked for Peugeot for about two years, doing design studies for the 2007-2009 car range. In 2000 he designed a low-draft fast ferry boat for Royal Denship in Denmark with the naval architect Herward Oehlmann.

== Naval design ==
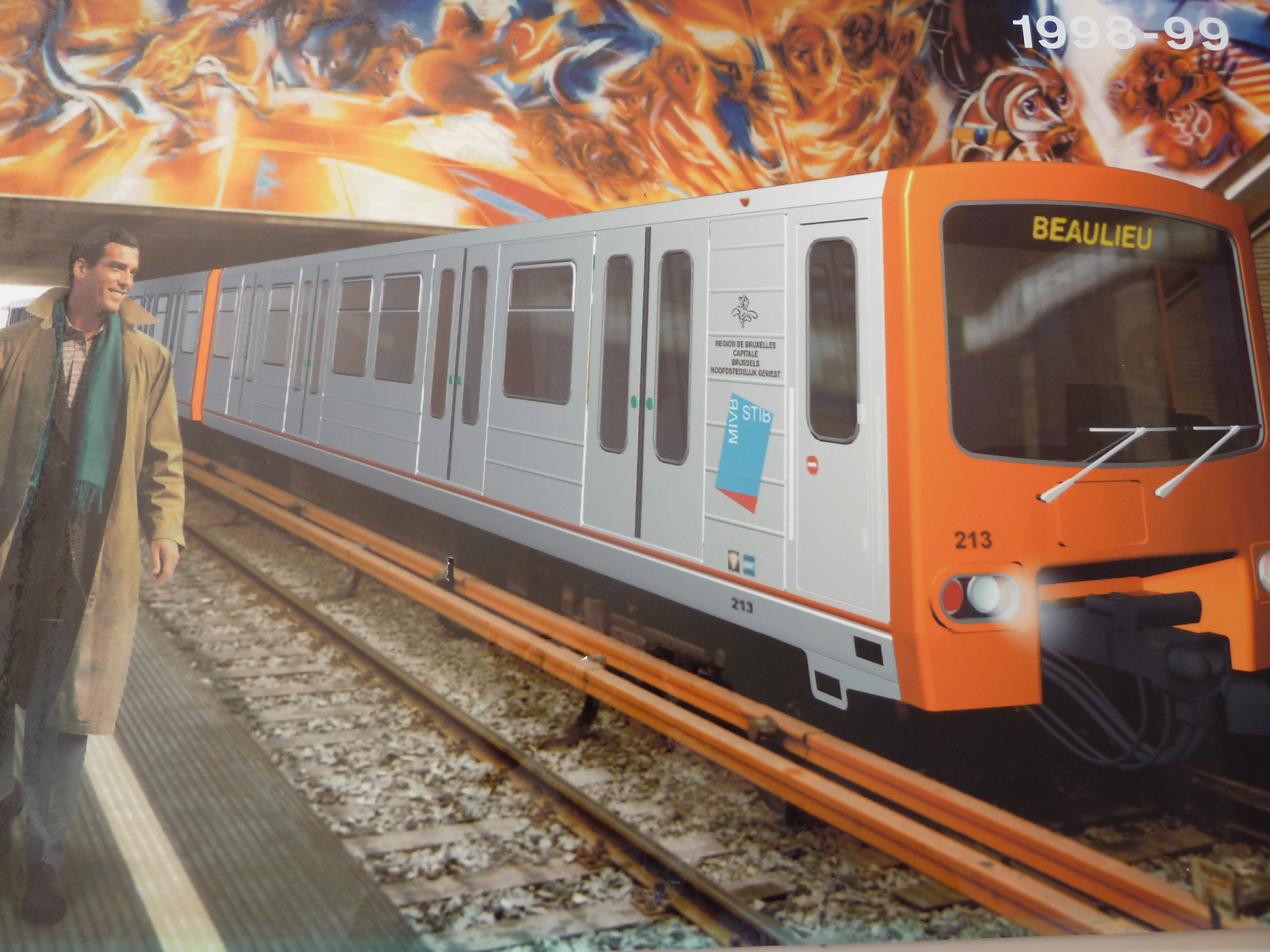
Johan Neerman, Brussels Metro 5th series

Johan Neerman worked on different naval designs in collaboration with German Naval architect Herward Oehlmann. Johan Neerman designed a low-draft ferry boat for Royal Denship in Denmark in 2000. The boat carry 366 passengers and 45 metres long. The main idea was to give the ferry boat a private yacht look. The ferry boat is about 45 metres long. His next work "Trimaran" is 99 metres long and 45 metres wide with a cruising speed 35 knots and an autonomy of 7,500 nautical miles. The entire ship was designed like a PlayStation, where inside and outside spaces contribute to the playfulness of open, semi-closed and open spaces. The length of the ship was determined by the wish to integrate the tender for 36 people and crew in the stern of the rear central hull section and to allow harbouring of the tender while the mother ship cruised at 30 knots inside the main hull. The length of the vessel also allowed any steps to be avoided, making use only of slopes. All glass windows were bullet-resistant and the hull has been compartmentalized. Ship is able to stay afloat and remain as light as possible.

== Furniture ==
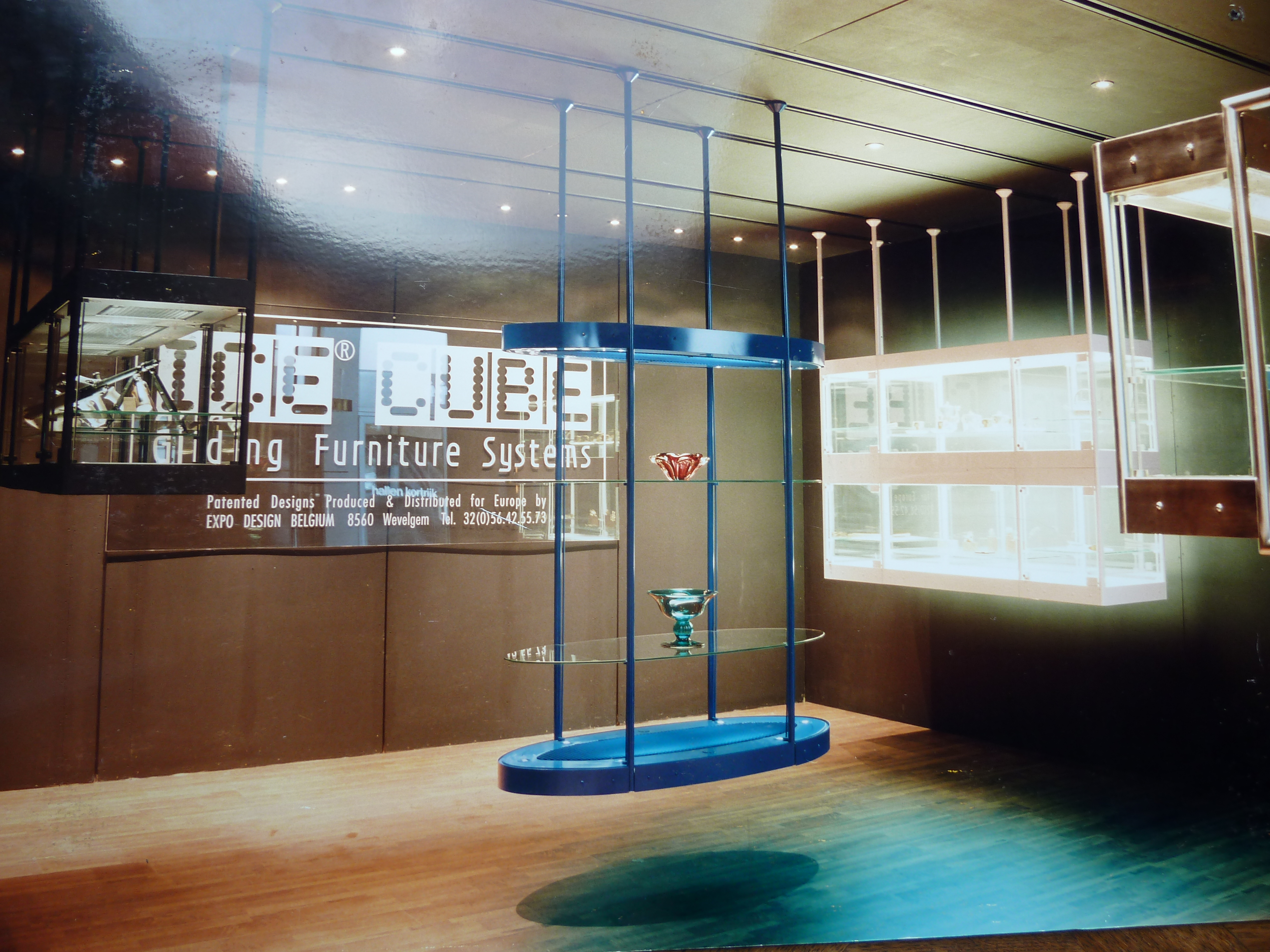
Johan Neerman, Ice-cube, 1994

In 1994 he designed a new display case concept "Ice Cube Gliding Furniture System". It's involves attachment to a ceiling of rails or fixed anchoring points. The rails are drawn steel profiles and are made in Austria. Electricity, sound systems (emergency) lighting systems an alarm systems are built into the ceilings. The suspended display cases can be moved manually or by remote control. The light source itself is invisible and the system allows an object to be lit without its throwing a shadow. Ice Cube won the "1998 Provincial Prize for Artistic Craft and Industrial Design" for the province of West Flanders. The system is being applied in the Musical Instrument Museum in Brussels. Many of his works were shown at:

- IF Hanover (Germany)
- Design Biennale of St Etienne (France)
- Jong Wonen (Belgium)
- Intérier, Kortrijk (Belgium)
- Casa Europea (Belgium)
- Ice Cube - Ghent, Kortrijk, Antwerp (Belgium)
- VIZO Brussels (Belgium)
- Ghent Design Museum.

== New Generation Personal Mobility ==
Johanson3 SA
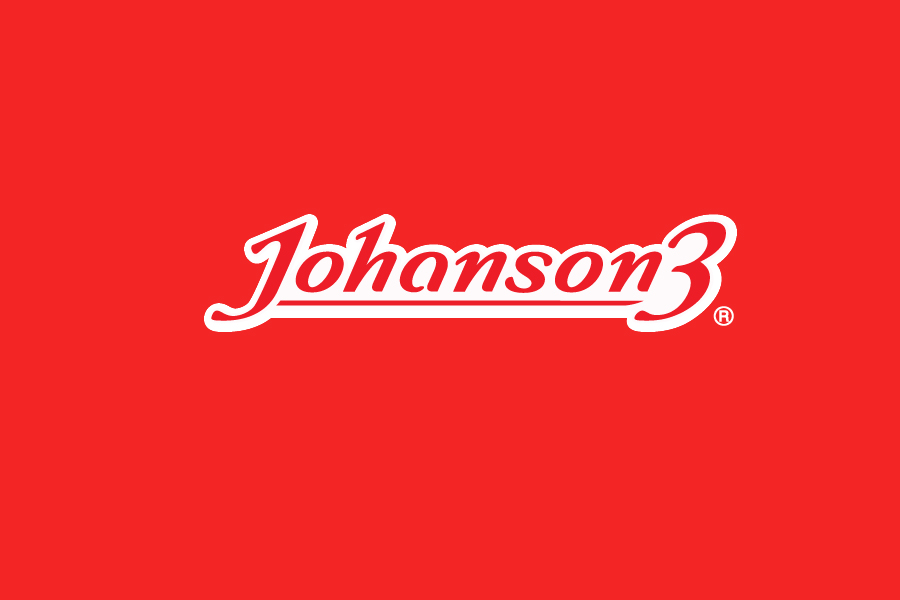
- Type: Startup
- Founded: 2011
- Founder: Johan Neerman
- Website: johanson3.com

Johanson3 (company) European transport design company based in Belgium that is developing new generation electric three-wheelers with high payload capacity. The company was created in 2011 by Johan Neerman CEO. The special frame allows in its strongest version to put 3 adults and 2 kids or the equivalent in payload capacity. The Johanson3 series are also designed with women and children in mind. Company has a background in transport design business since 1967 IDPO Philippe Neerman.

== Concept ==
The Johanson3 electric scooter concept is to replace current polluting and inefficient means of transportation in suburban and urban areas. It is the first light stable vehicle with high payload capacity also designed for women and children.

== Johanson3 range ==
Range of Johanson3 trikes consists of 5 vehicles. The design is a stable three-wheeler, with the driver leaning back rather than sitting (though sitting is an option). Feet rest on a plate, and pressing down on that plate creates a lean on the front wheel, turning the vehicle while the rear wheels remain solidly on the ground. Various models accommodate single riders with their payload. The commuter models are not much wider than the elbows of a rider hunched over a pair of mountain bike handlebars, and can slip through a standard doorway. The overall mobility concept is allowing the latest technology in terms of propulsion. The frame allows also the fitting of different tires such as: off-road tires, spike tires, or balloon tires for soft surfaces.

== History ==
Johanson3 SA emerged from a family business with numerous prestigious references in the design of public transport systems with more than 40 original vehicles designed worldwide. His father, Philippe Neerman, was Belgian industrial designer.

Several prototypes were made prior to the creation of the company. Most of them were made in Italy and corrected in northern France.It took several years to validate the concept the business model and define the right functionalities. The first mule was designed to validate the propulsion and the ergonomics. The second prototype was materialized in a shorter version and was equipped with two rear engines and was tested successfully. Speeds up to 60 km/h were reached with a range of 40 km in full charge. Springs were added making the tilting more efficient and responsive. Many more ergonomic studies and refinement were made on the design side before another prototype was made.

== Publications ==
1. De Smedt, Klara (April 1999). "3 vasies op tentoonstellingsdesign". Kwintessens. 56: 16.
2. Janssen, Karel (May 1996). "De stad hertekend". Trends. 146: 60.
3. Osteaux, Francoise (2003). "The global method". Arte News. 121: 113.
4. Vanherpe, Patrick (July 1999). "Industriele vormgeving en de onderneming". West Vlaanderen Werkt. 188: 165.
5. Callico, Catherine (August 2000). "Neerman dans le métro". Le Soir. 30: 26.
6. Binst, Jean-Marie (December 2000). "The Metro, and beyond". Tram 81. 30: 20.
7. Anna Albano, Paola Ranzini; Edith Doove (June 2000). Dynamic City. Brussels: Skira/Seuil. pp. 83–90. ISBN 978-88-8118-771-3.
8. Fonk, Hans (April 1998). "Van Treehouse tot maxi Sampan". Object. 232: 78.
9. Febvre, Jacqueline; Isabelle Monier (September 2001). I.D.P.O.-Neerman Consulting. Paris: A.P.C.I. pp. 104–105. ISBN 2-86227-256-6.
10. Febvre, Jacqueline; Isabelle Monier (September 1999). I.D.P.O.-Neerman Consulting. Paris: A.P.C.I. pp. 104–105. ISBN 2-86227-158-6.
11. Deryckere, Filip (April 1998). "Johan Neerman". Industriele Vormgeving. 32: 7–12.
12. Sap, Hubert (October 1998). "Johan Neerman". Interieur 98. 402: 64.
13. Bekaert, Geert (November 1998). "Johan Neerman". Facetten#4. 75.
14. Rits, Cis (October 2000). "Johan Neerman". Plan. 35: 15.
15. Smets, Francis (November 2002). "Can design solve the problem of mobility?". Kwintessens. 55: 7.
16. Baudelaire, Charles (November 2002). "Le tramway de l'agglomeration strasbourgeoise". Dessiner le Futur de la Mobilité Urbaine. 127: 67.
17. Grutter, Josef (March 1992). "Johan Neerman". Industrie Forum Design Hannover. 447: 125.

== Gallery ==
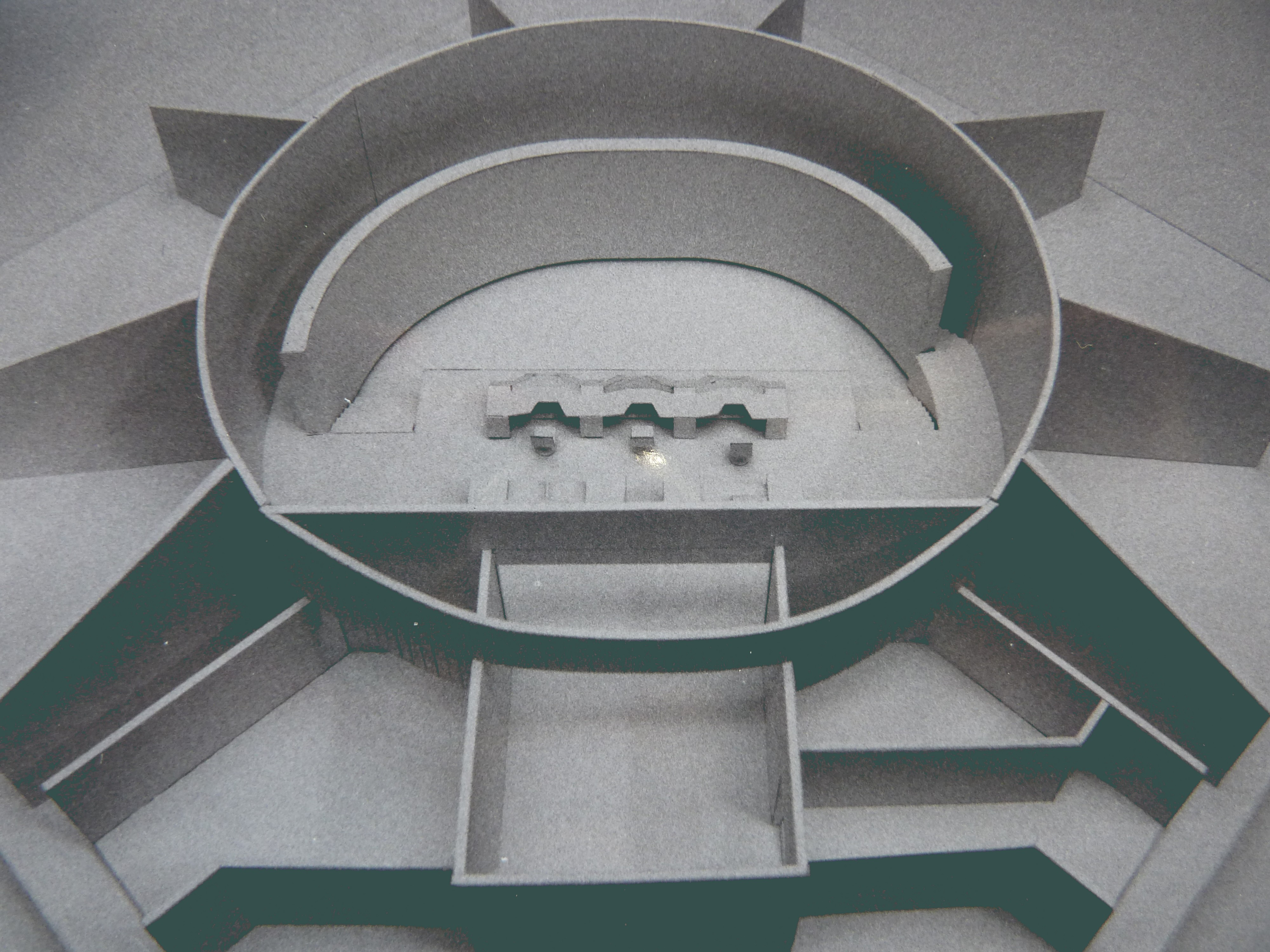
Control room

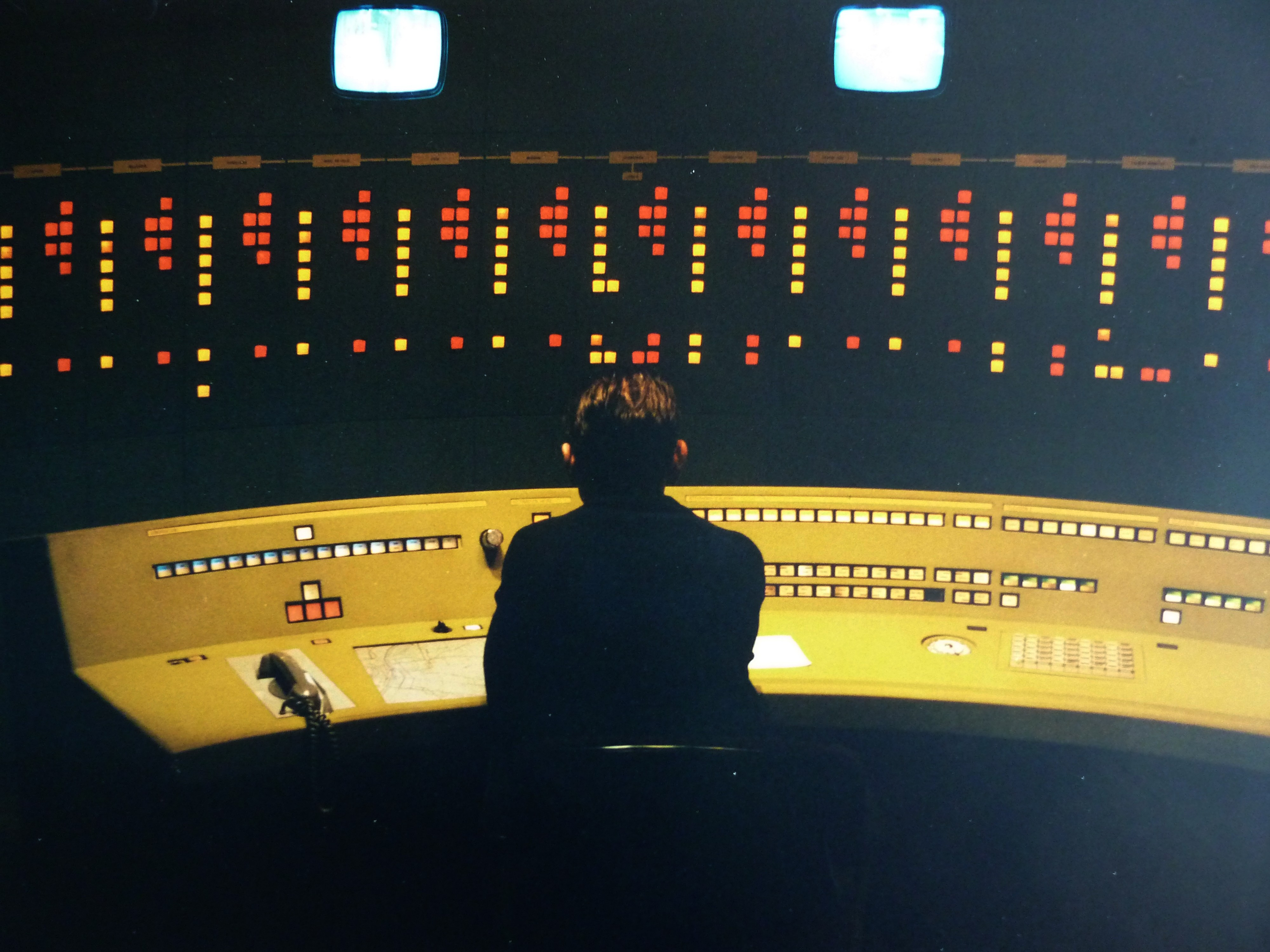
Control room by Johan Neerman

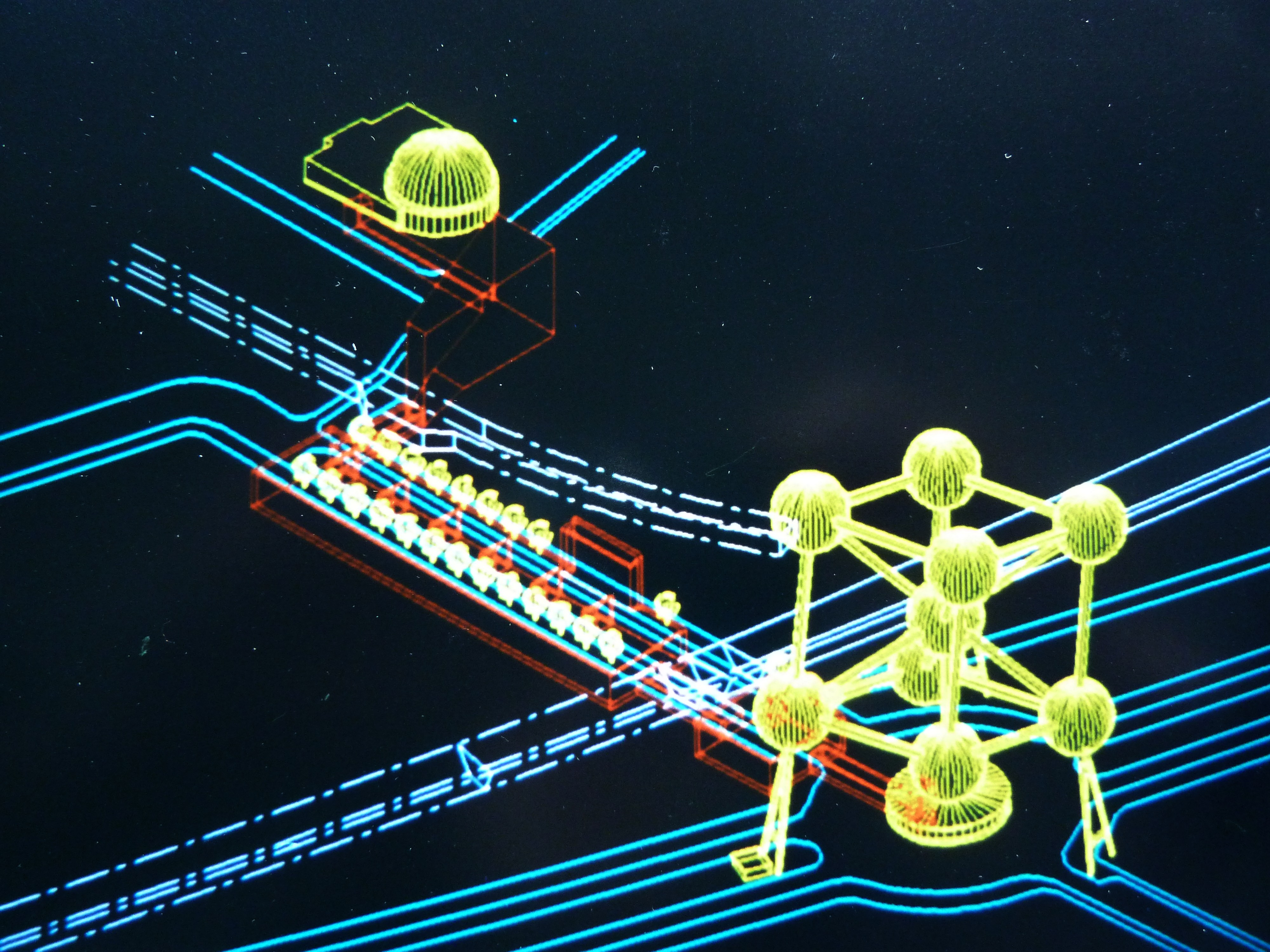
Atomium Underground Connection Brussels, Belgium

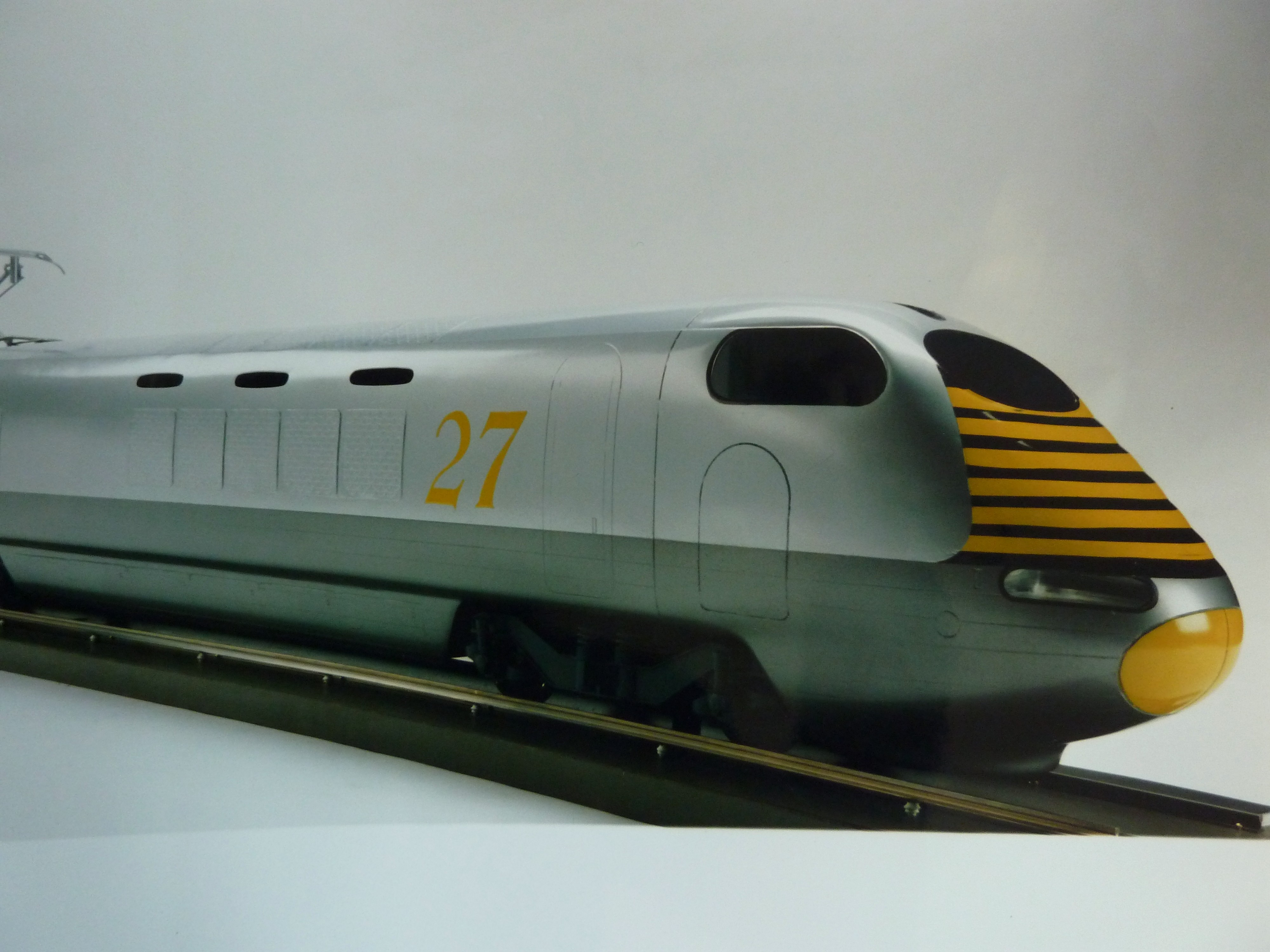
TGV

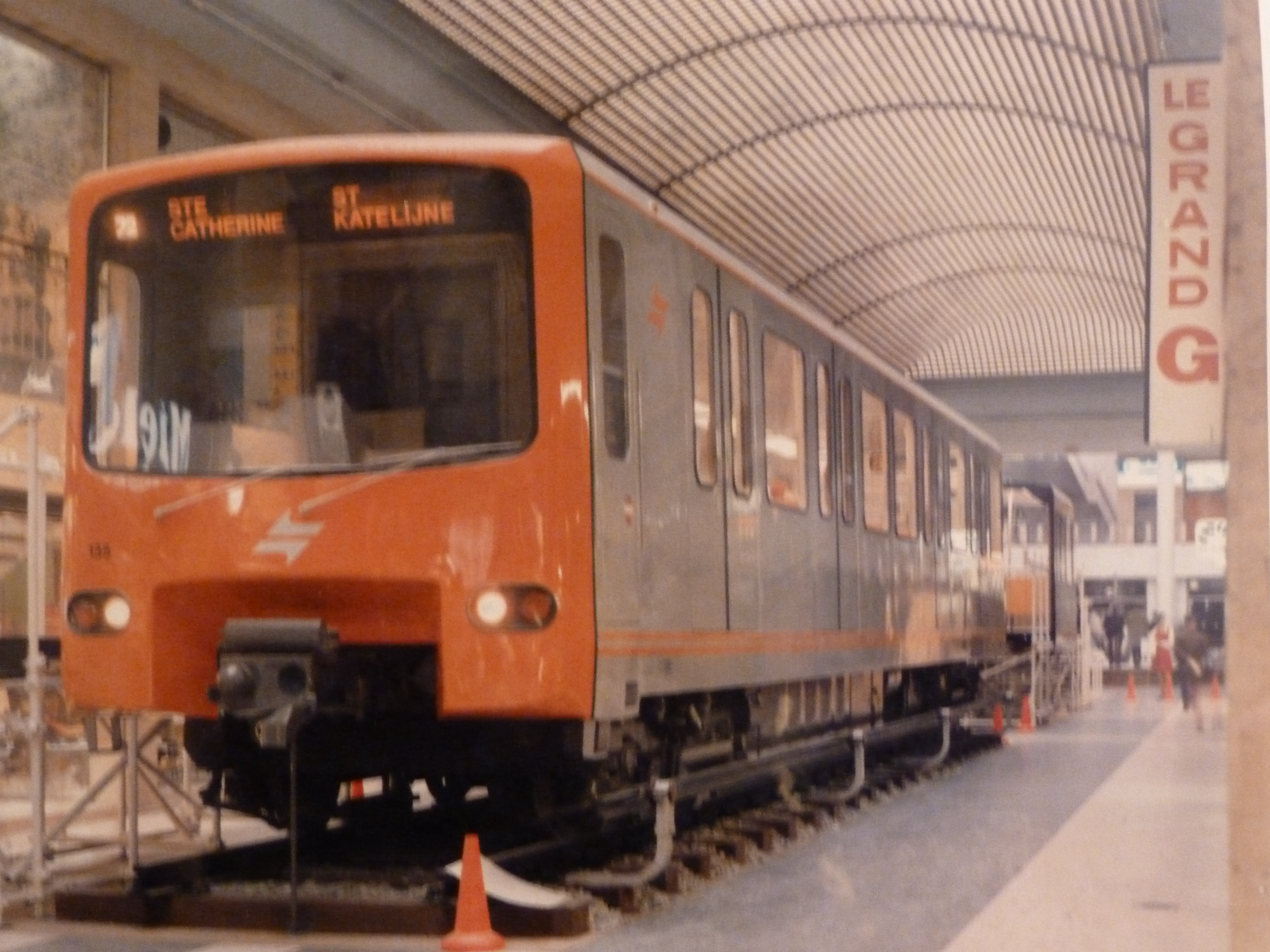
Brussel's metro

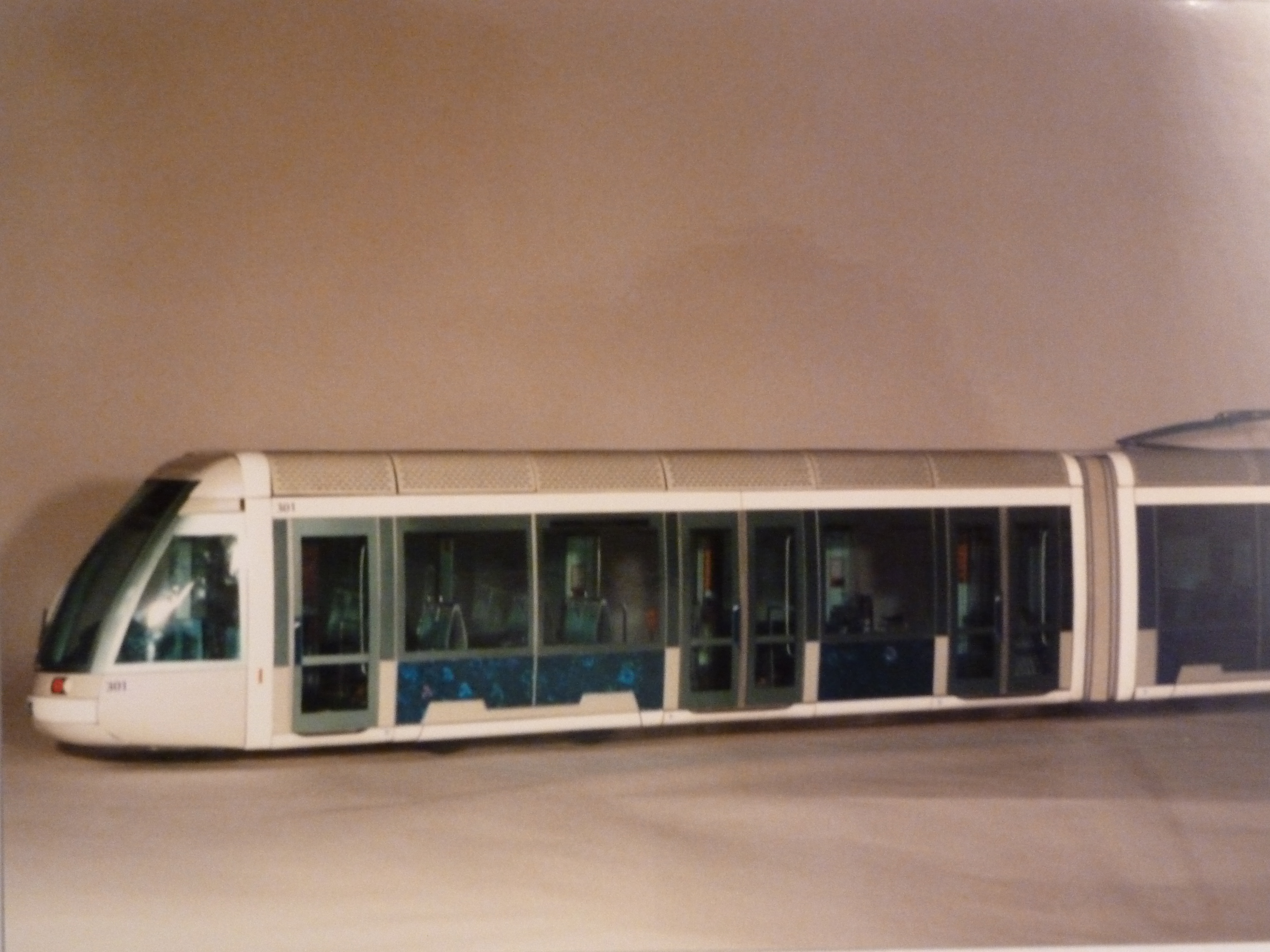
Citadis Montpellier

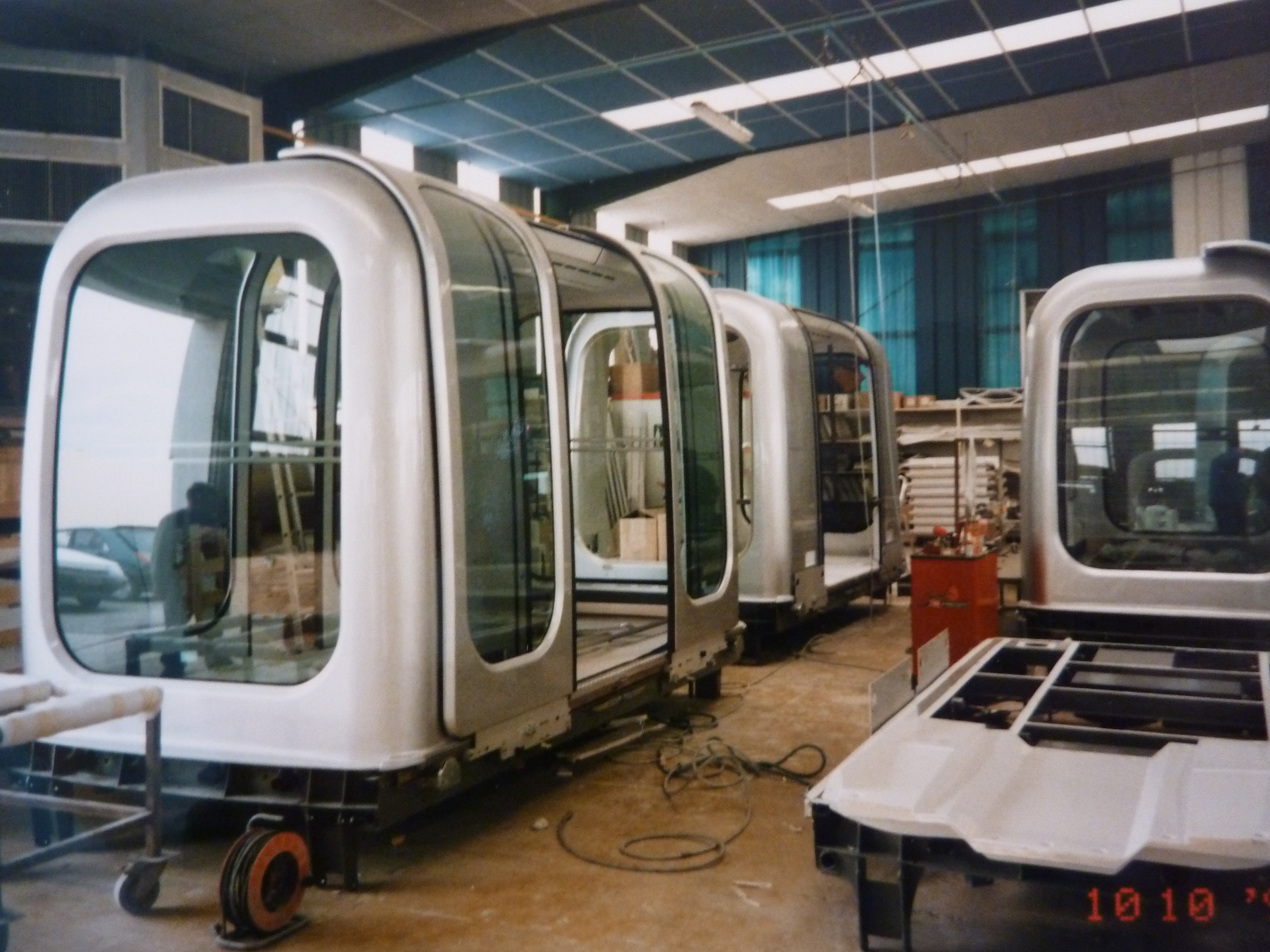
System SK

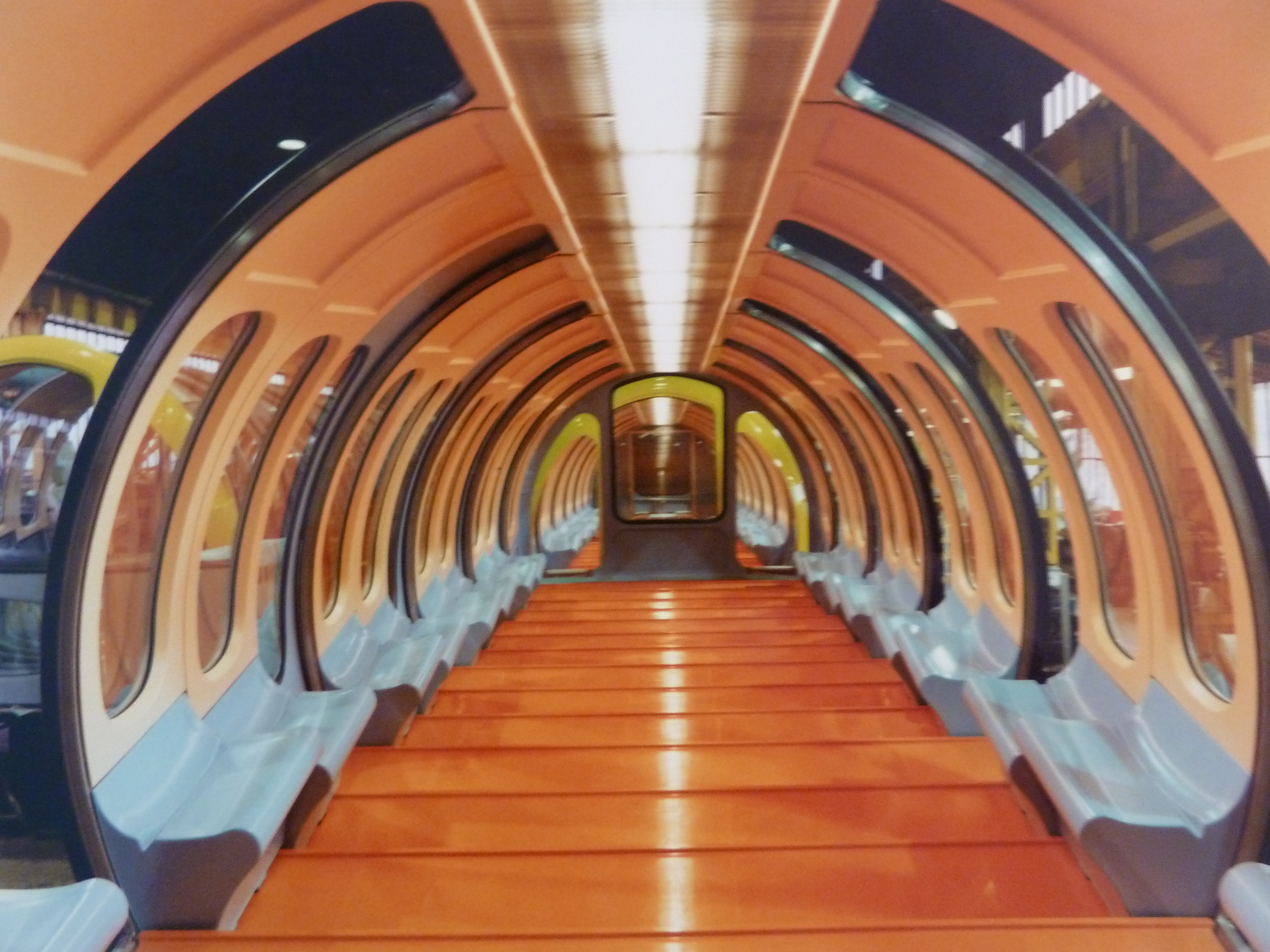
Funicular Tigner

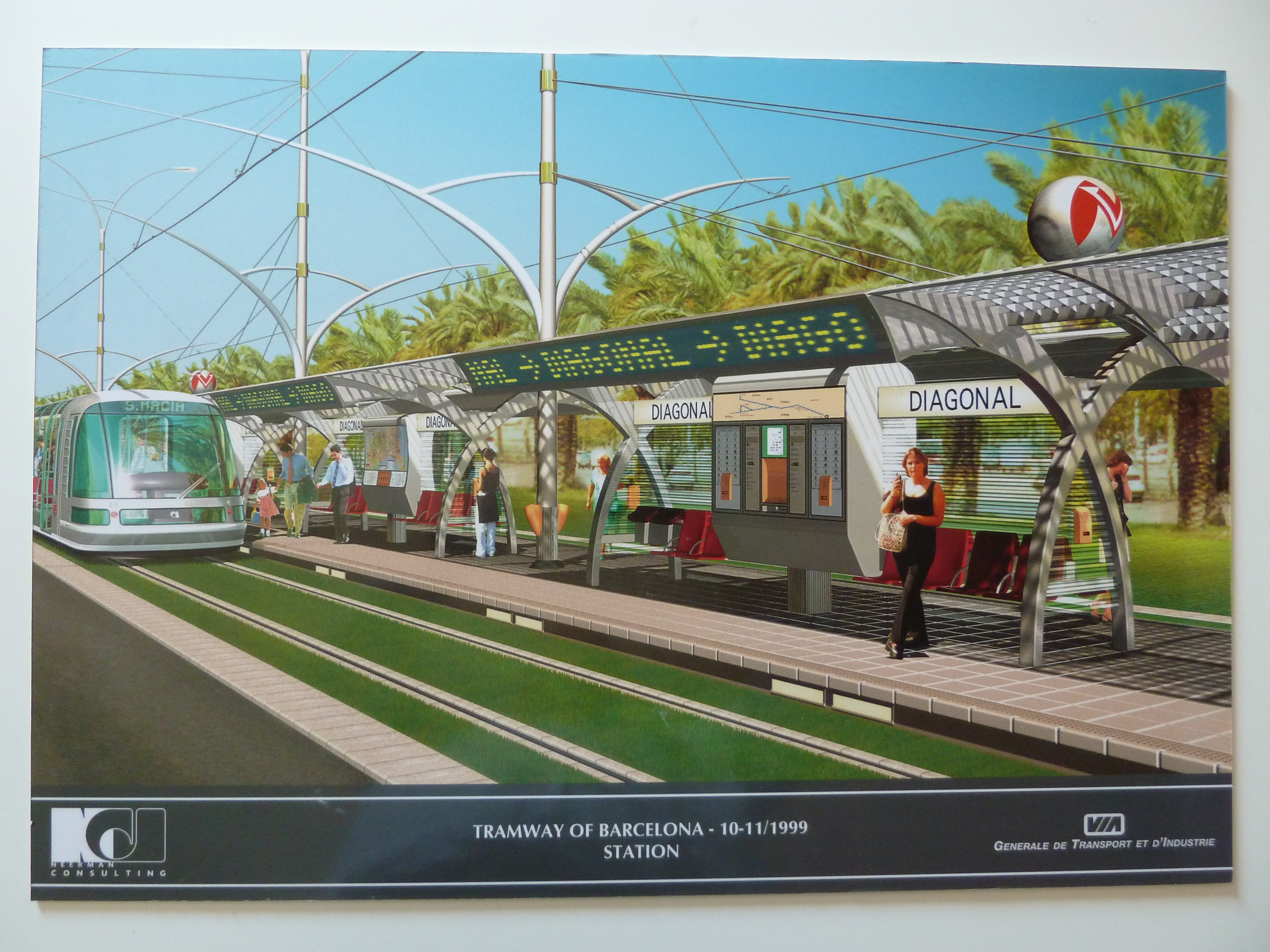
Tramway of Barcelona-station 1999

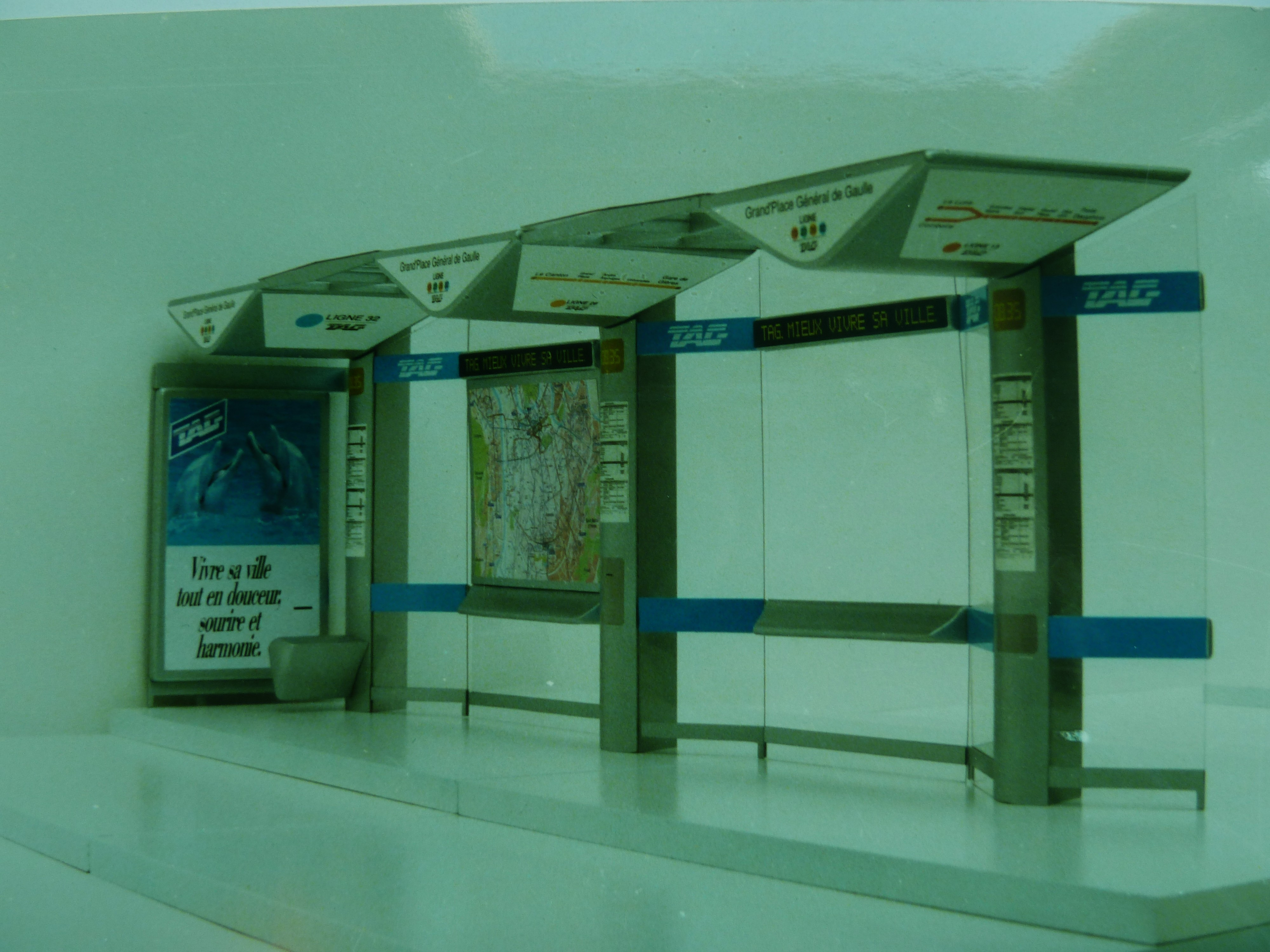
Bus Stop Grenoble

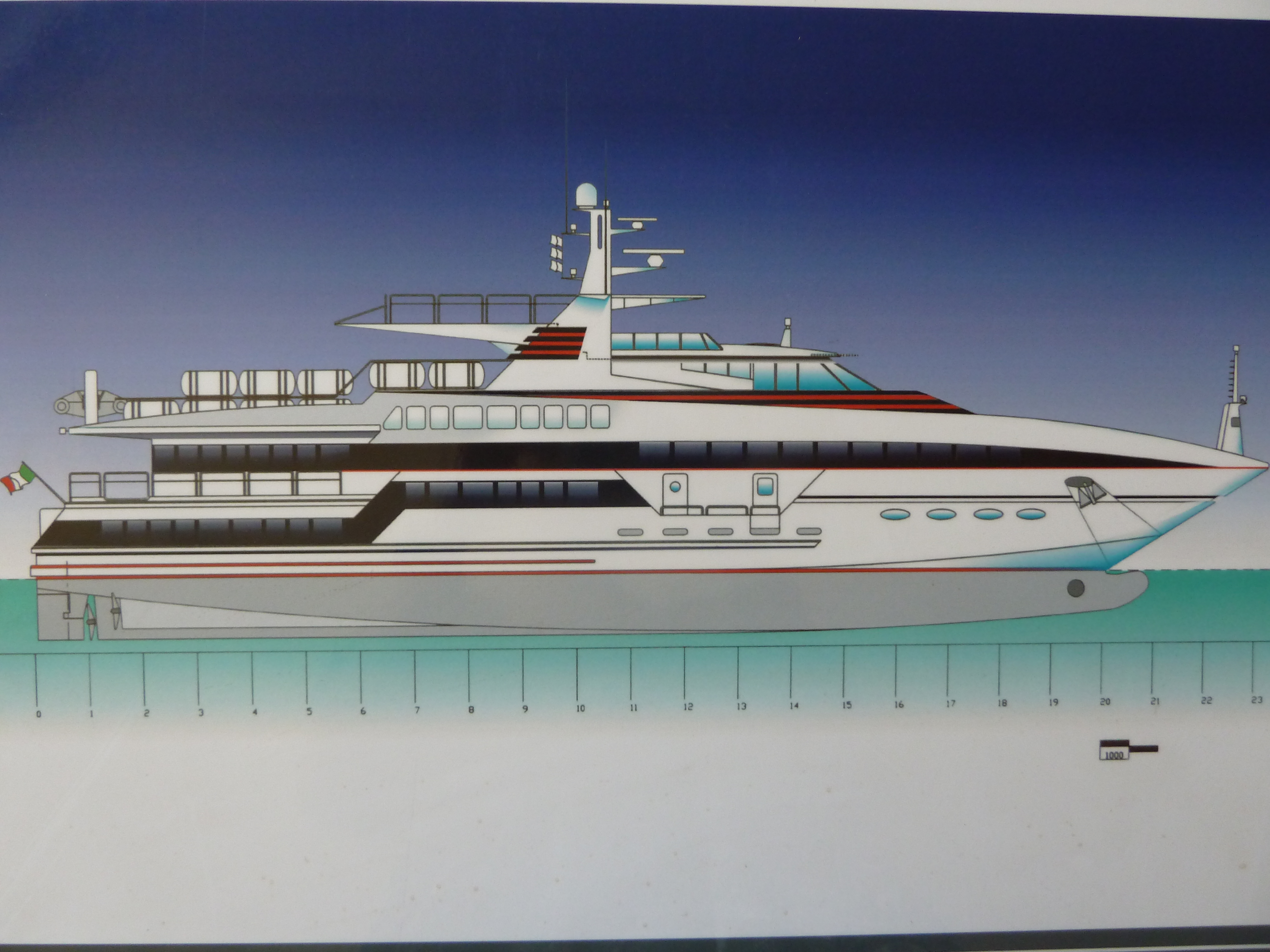
Power trimaran yacht

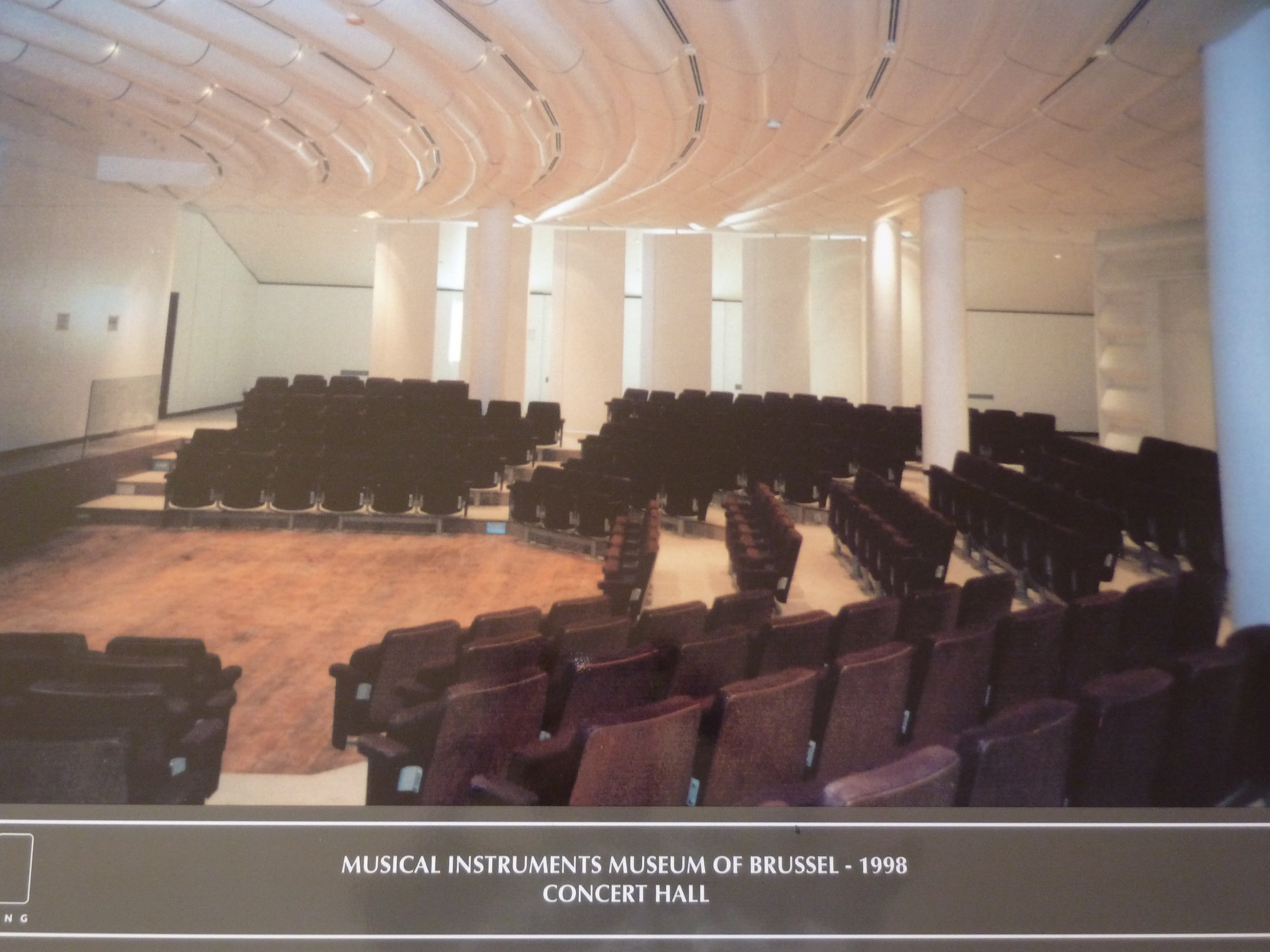
Museum of Musical instruments Concert Hall
