= Antwerp =

City located in Flanders, Belgium

Antwerp Antwerpen (Dutch) Anvers (French)
- City and municipality
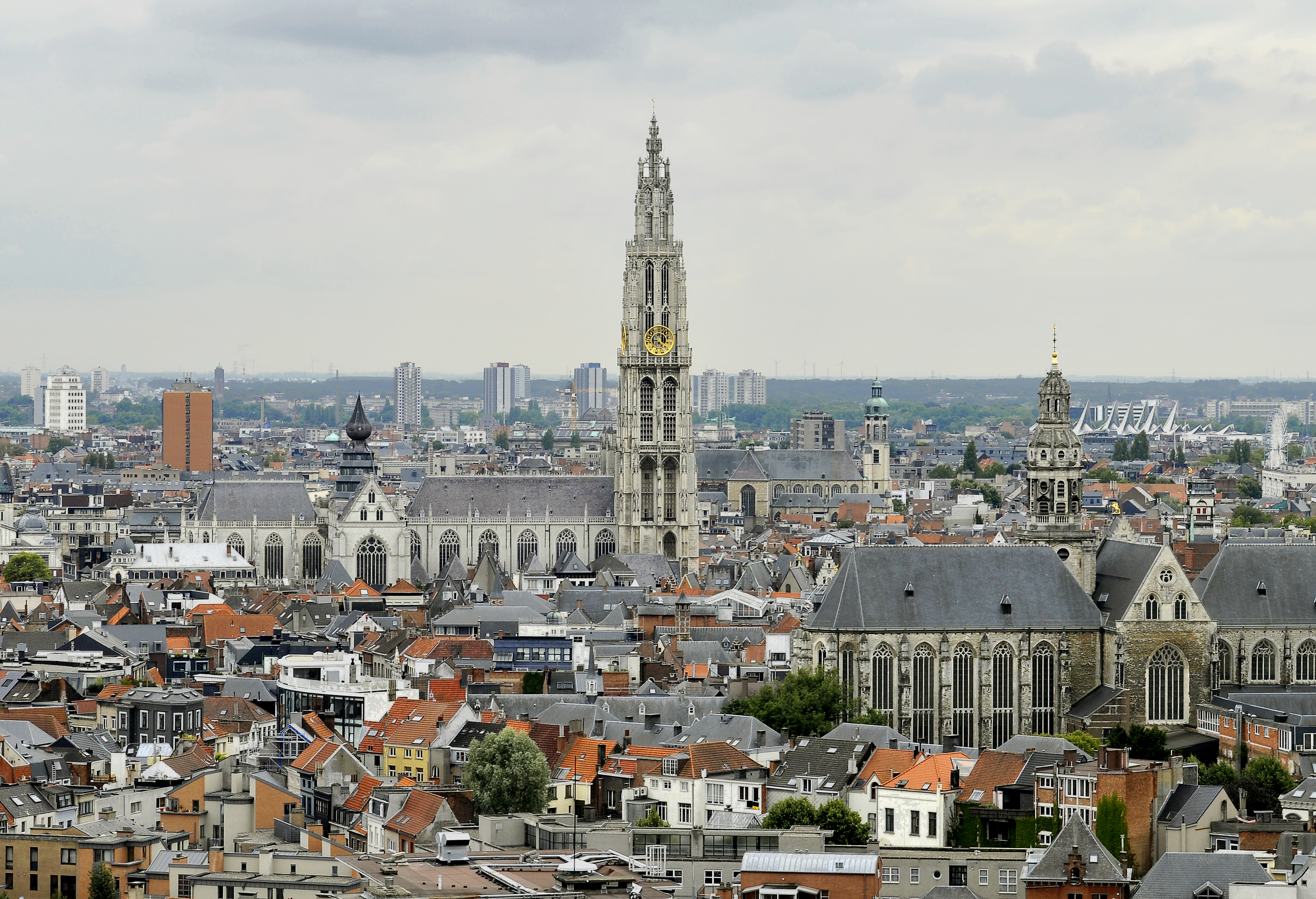
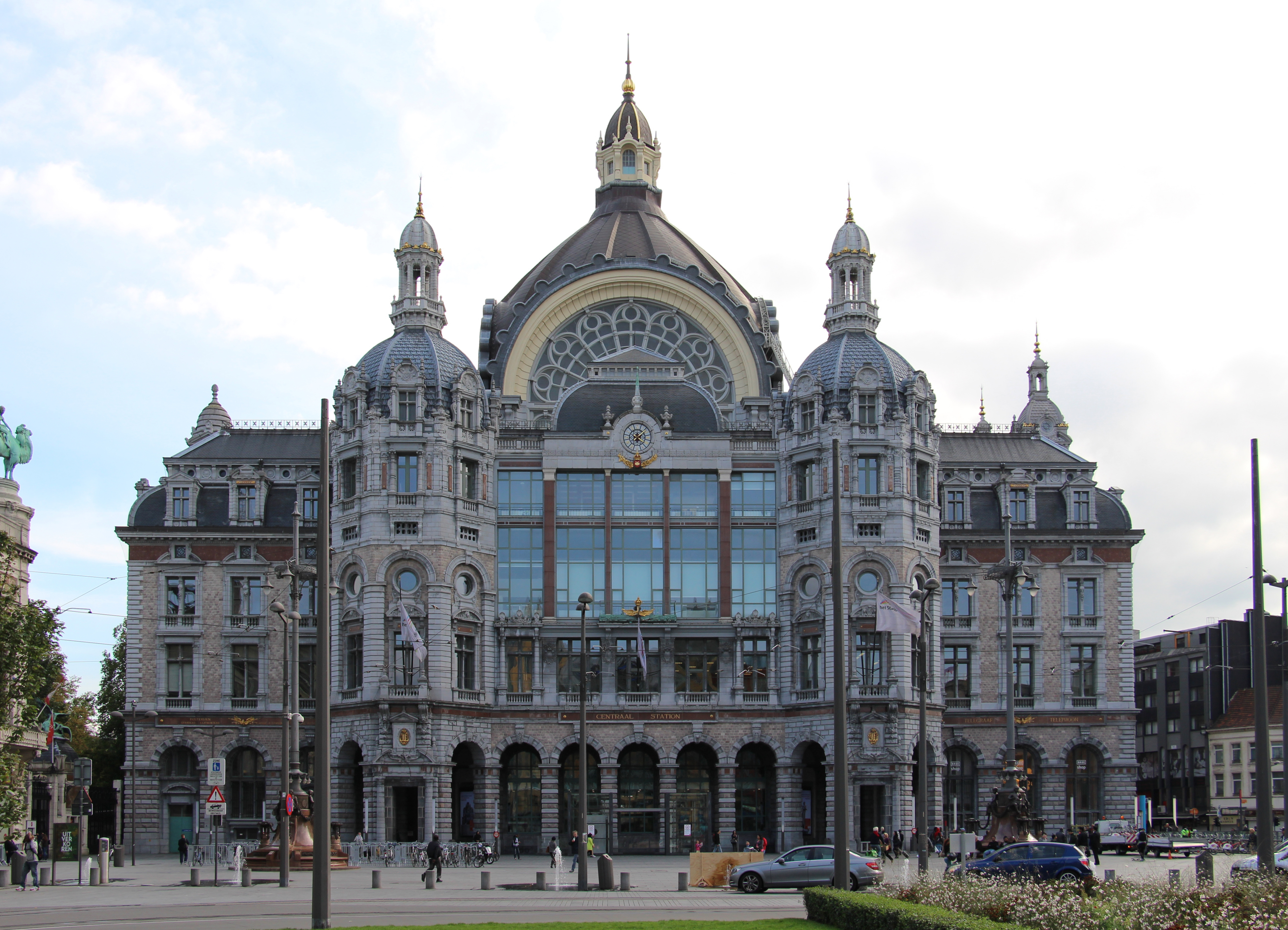
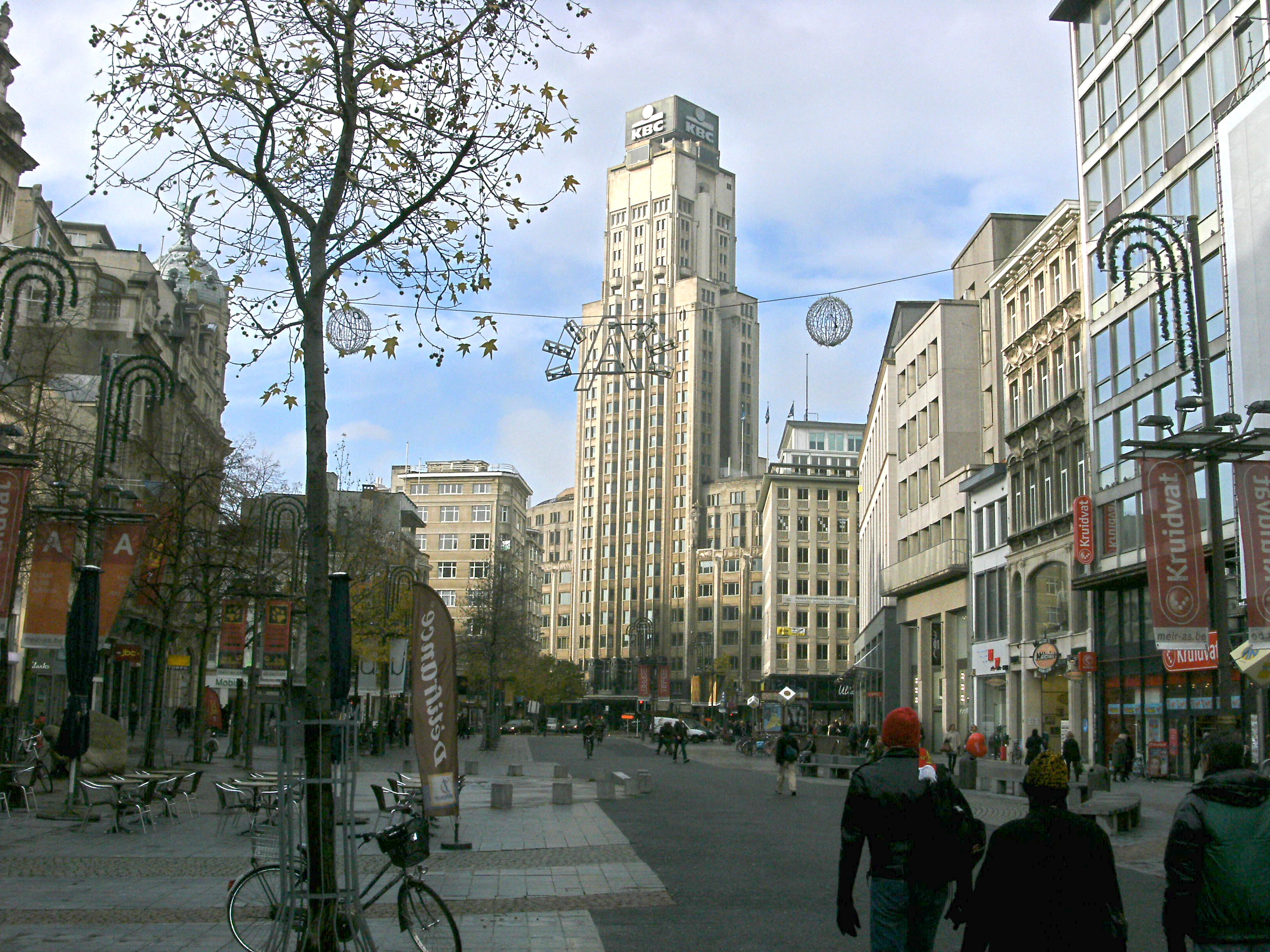
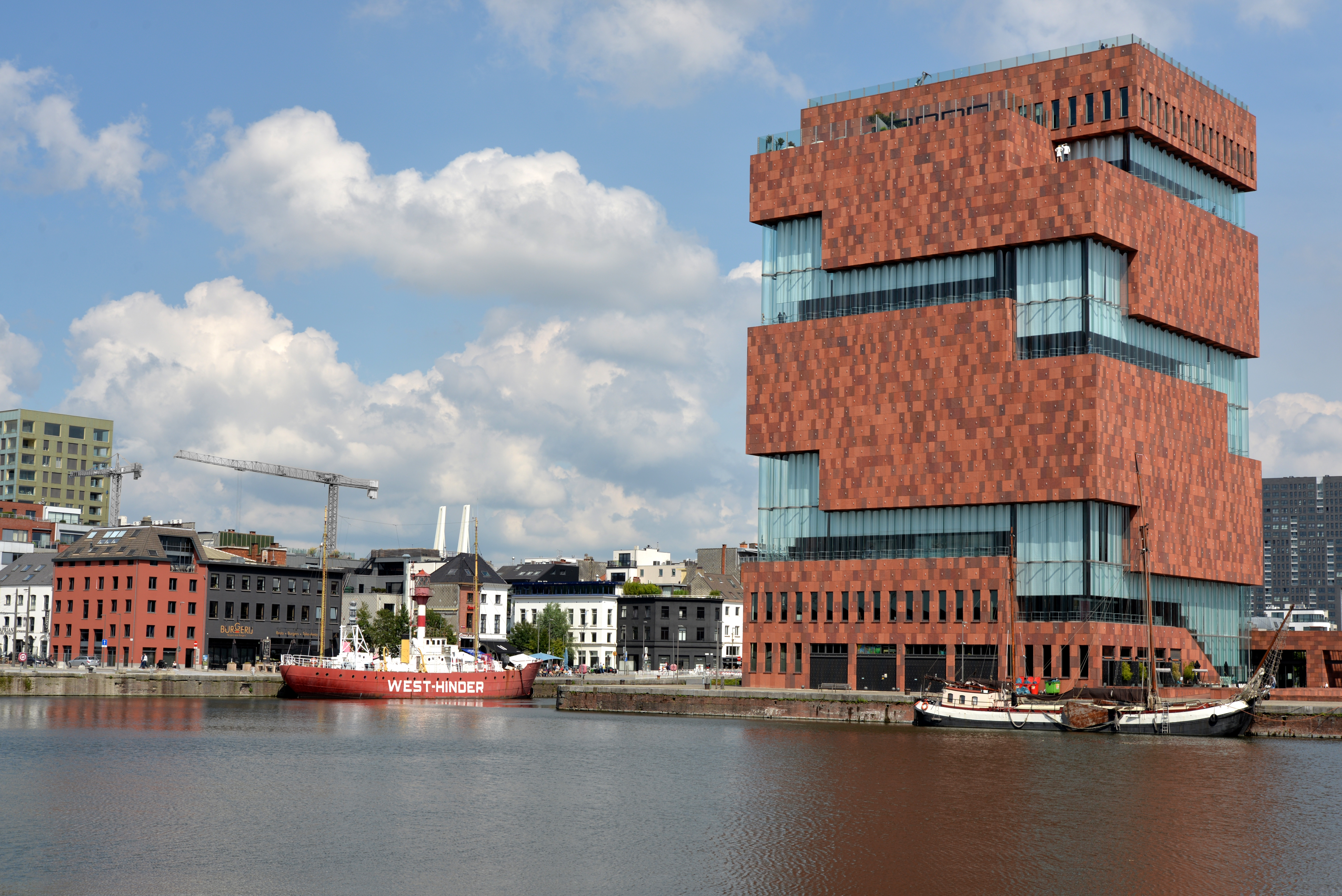
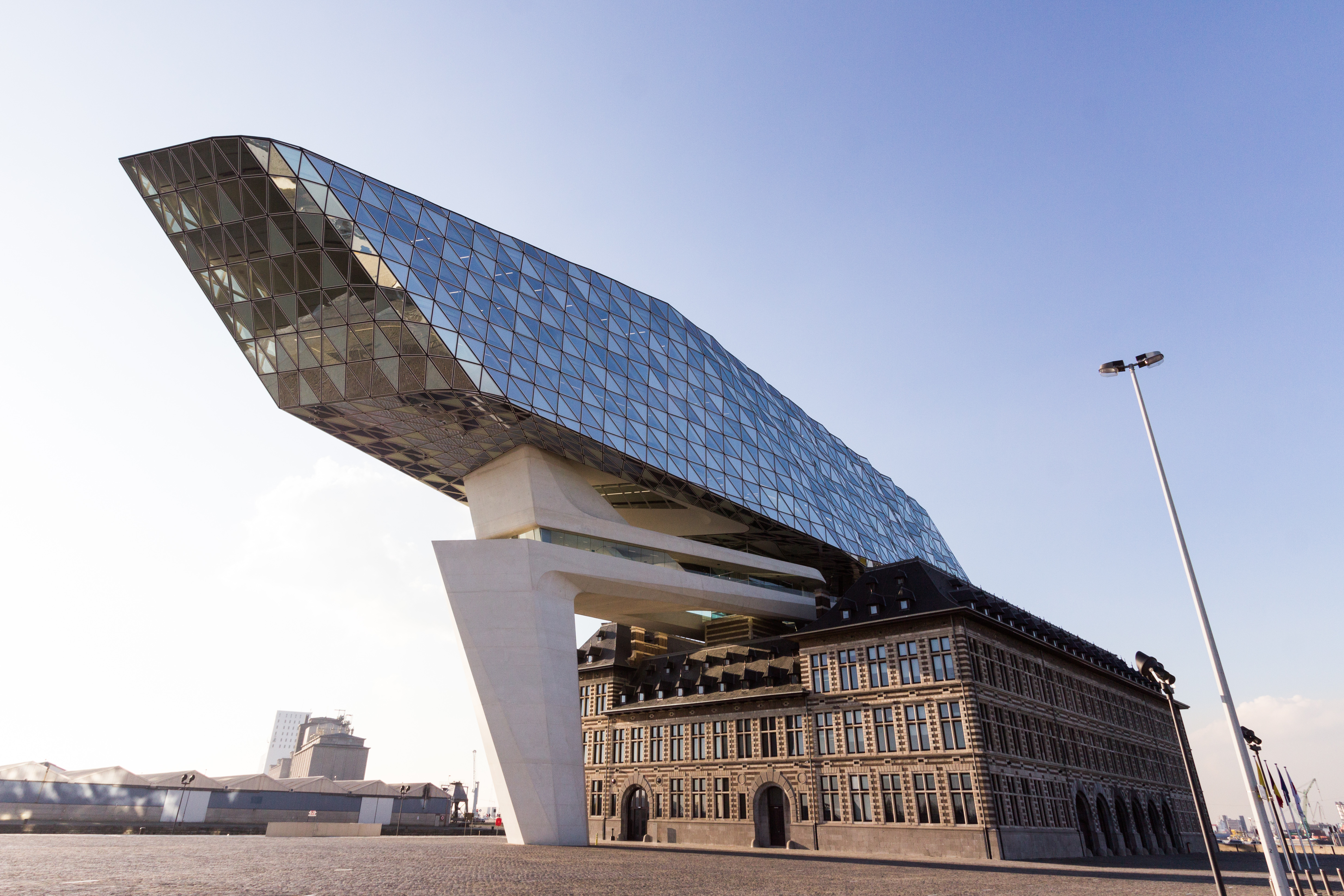
- Antwerp skyline with the Cathedral of Our Lady Antwerp Central Station Boerentoren Museum aan de Stroom Port Authority Building

- Flag Coat of arms
- Nicknames: Sinjoren and Pagadders
- Motto: Atypisch Antwerpen (Atypical Antwerp)
- Interactive map of Antwerp
- Location in Belgium Antwerp (Europe)
- Coordinates: 51°13′04″N 04°24′01″E
- Country: Belgium
- Region: Flanders
- Province: Antwerp
- Boroughs: Ten districts: Antwerp; Berchem; Berendrecht-Zandvliet-Lillo; Borgerhout; Borsbeek; Deurne; Ekeren; Hoboken; Merksem; Wilrijk

Government
  - Mayor: Els van Doesburg (N-VA)
  - Governing parties: N-VA, Vooruit

Area
  - Municipality: 208.22 km^{2} (80.39 sq mi)
- Elevation: 8 m (26 ft)

Population (2024-11-01)
  - Municipality: 565,039
  - Rank: 2nd
  - Density: 2,713.7/km^{2} (7,028.4/sq mi)
  - Metro: 1,230,000
- Demonyms: Antwerpenaar; Antwerpian; Sinjoor (colloquial)
- Time zone: UTC+01:00 (CET)
  - Summer (DST): UTC+02:00 (CEST)
- Postcode: 2000–2660
- Area code: 03
- Website: antwerpen.be
- Logo of Antwerp

Antwerp (/ˈæntwɜːrp/; Dutch: Antwerpen [ˈɑntʋɛrpə(n)]; French: Anvers [ɑ̃vɛʁs]) is a city and a municipality in the Flemish Region of Belgium. It is the capital and largest city of Antwerp Province, and the third-largest municipality in Belgium by area at 208.22 km^{2} (80.39 sq mi). With a population of 565,039, it is the most populous municipality in Belgium, and with a metropolitan population of over 1.2 million people, the country's second-largest metropolitan area after Brussels. (Note: The Brussels-Capital Region, whose metropolitan area comprises the City of Brussels itself plus 18 independent municipal entities, counts over 1,700,000 inhabitants, but these communities are counted separately by the Belgian Statistics Office.)

The river Scheldt flows through Antwerp, linking it to the North Sea by the river's Westerschelde estuary. Antwerp is about 40 km (25 mi) north of Brussels, and about 15 km (9 mi) south of the Dutch border. The Port of Antwerp is one of the biggest in the world, ranking second in Europe after Rotterdam and within the top 20 globally. The city is also known as the hub of the world's diamond trade. In 2020, the Globalization and World Cities Research Network rated Antwerp as a Gamma + (third level/top tier) Global City.

Both economically and culturally, Antwerp is and has long been an important city in the Low Countries, especially before and during the Spanish Fury (1576) and throughout and after the subsequent Dutch Revolt. The Stock Exchange in Antwerp, originally built in 1531 and re-built in 1872, was the world's first purpose-built commodity exchange. (Note: It was founded before stocks and shares existed, so was not strictly a stock exchange.) In 1920, the city hosted the Summer Olympics.

The natives of Antwerp are nicknamed Sinjoren (Dutch pronunciation: [sɪˈɲoːrə(n)]), after the Spanish honorific señor or French seigneur, "lord", referring to the Spanish noblemen who ruled the city in the 17th century. The city's population is very diverse, including about 180 nationalities; as of 2019, more than 50% of its population had a parent that was not a Belgian citizen at birth. A notable community is the Jewish one, as Antwerp is one of the only two cities in Europe (together with London and its Stamford Hill neighbourhood) that is home to a considerable Haredi population in the 21st century.

== Toponymy ==
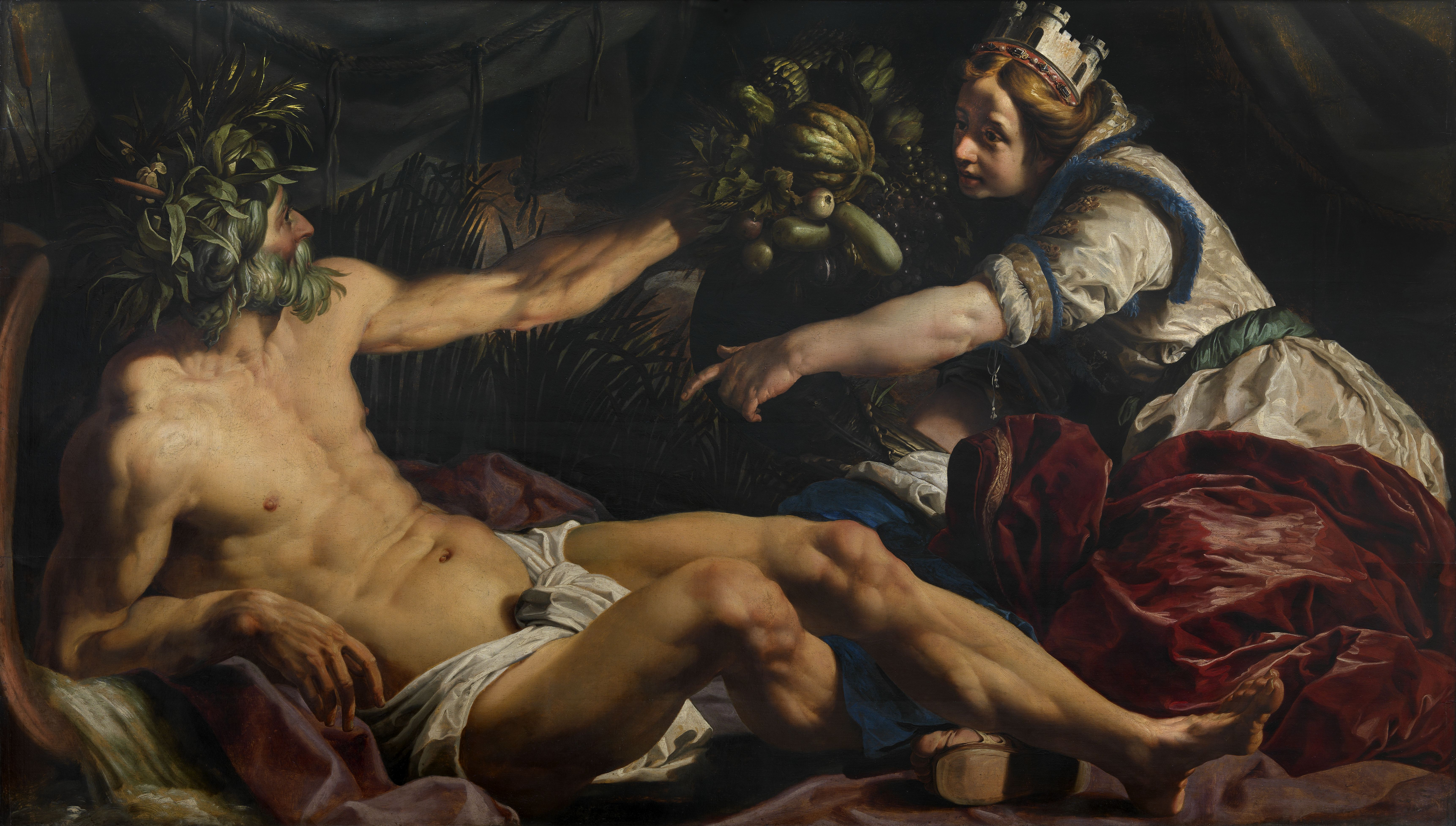
Scaldis ("the Scheldt") and Antverpia ("Antwerp"), Abraham Janssens, 1609, oil on panel, Royal Museum of Fine Arts, Antwerp

Early recorded versions of the name include Ando Verpia on Roman coins found in the city centre, Germanic Andhunerbo from around the time Austrasia became a separate kingdom (that is, about 567 CE), and (possibly originally Celtic) Andoverpis in Dado's Life of St. Eligius (Vita Eligii) from about 700 CE. The form Antverpia is Neo-Latin.

A Germanic (Frankish or Frisian) origin could contain prefix anda ("against") and a noun derived from the verb werpen ("to throw") and denote, for example: land thrown up at the riverbank; an alluvial deposit; a mound (like a terp) thrown up (as a defence) against (something or someone); or a wharf. If Andoverpis is Celtic in origin, it could mean "those who live on both banks".

There is a folklore tradition that the name Antwerpen is from Dutch handwerpen ("hand-throwing"). A giant called Druon Antigoon is said to have lived near the Scheldt river and extracted a toll from passing boatmen. He severed the hand of anyone who did not pay and threw it in the river. Eventually, the giant was killed by a young hero named Silvius Brabo who cut off the giant's own hand and flung that into the river. This is unlikely to be the true origin, but it is celebrated by a statue (illustrated further below) in the city's main market square, the Grote Markt.

== History ==
=== Pre-1500 ===
Historical Antwerp allegedly had its origins in a Gallo-Roman vicus. Excavations carried out in the oldest section near the Scheldt river in 1952–1961 (ref. Princeton), produced pottery shards and fragments of glass from the mid-2nd century to the end of the 3rd century. In the 4th century, Antwerp was first named, having been settled by the Germanic Franks.

The Merovingian Antwerp was evangelized by Saint Amand in the 7th century. Het Steen Castle has its origins in the Carolingian period in the 9th century. The castle may have been built after the Viking incursions in the early Middle Ages; in 879 the Normans invaded Flanders. The surviving structure was built between 1200 and 1225 as a gateway to a larger castle of the Dukes of Brabant which was demolished in the 19th century. It is Antwerp's oldest building. At the end of the 10th century, the Scheldt became the boundary of the Holy Roman Empire. Antwerp became a margraviate in 980, by the German emperor Otto II, a border province facing the County of Flanders.

In the 11th century, the best-known leader of the First Crusade (1096–1099), Godfrey of Bouillon, was originally Margrave of Antwerp, from 1076 until his death in 1100, though he was later also Duke of Lower Lorraine (1087–1100) and Defender of the Holy Sepulchre (1099–1100). In the 12th century, Norbert of Xanten established a community of his Premonstratensian canons at St. Michael's Abbey at Caloes. Antwerp was also the headquarters of Edward III during his early negotiations with Jacob van Artevelde, and his son Lionel, the Duke of Clarence, was born there in 1338.

=== 16th century ===
After the silting-up of the Zwin and the consequent decline of Bruges, Antwerp, then part of the Duchy of Brabant, grew in importance, with the city doubling its population between 1500 and 1569. At the end of the 15th century, the foreign trading houses were transferred from Bruges to Antwerp, and the building assigned to the association of English merchants active in the city is specifically mentioned in 1510. During this time, the old Mediterranean trade routes were gradually losing importance and the discovery of new sea routes via Africa to Asia and via the Atlantic to America helped push Antwerp to a position of prominence.

By 1504, the Portuguese had established Antwerp as one of their main shipping bases, bringing in spices from Asia and trading them for textiles and metal goods. The city's trade expanded to include cloth from England, Italy and Germany, wines from Germany, France and Spain, salt from France, and wheat from the Baltic. The city's skilled workers processed soap, fish, sugar, and especially cloth. Banks helped finance the trade, the merchants, and the manufacturers. The city was a cosmopolitan centre; its Stock Exchange opened in 1531, "To the merchants of all nations."

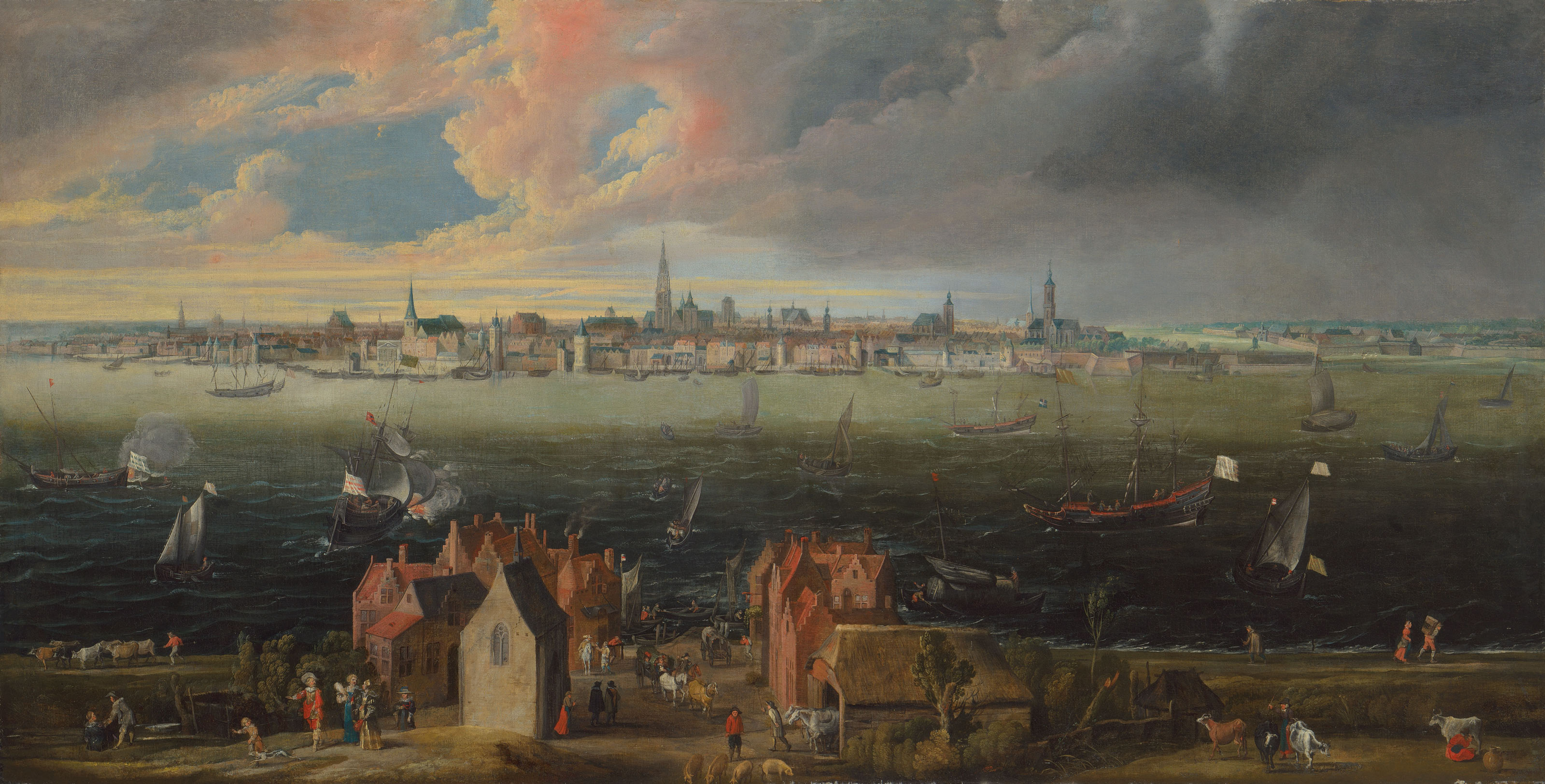
View of Antwerp around 1500 by Jan Wildens

Antwerp became the sugar capital of Europe, importing the raw commodity from Portuguese and Spanish plantations on both sides of the Atlantic, where it was grown by a mixture of free and forced labour, increasingly with enslaved Africans as the century progressed. The city attracted Italian and German sugar refiners by 1550, and shipped their refined product to Germany, especially Cologne. Antwerp also had an unusually high number of painters, around 360 in 1560, in a city with a population of roughly 89,000 in 1569 (250 people per painter), it was the most important artistic centre north of the Alps, serving notable painters such as Pieter Bruegel. Moneylenders and financiers developed a large business lending money all over Europe including the English government in 1544–1574. London bankers were too small to operate on that scale, and Antwerp had a highly efficient stock exchange that itself attracted rich bankers from around Europe. After the 1570s, the city's banking business declined: England ceased its borrowing in Antwerp in 1574.

Fernand Braudel states that Antwerp became "the centre of the entire international economy, something Bruges had never been even at its height." Antwerp had the highest growth rate and was the richest city in Europe at the time. Antwerp's Golden Age is tightly linked to the "Age of Exploration". During the first half of the 16th century, Antwerp grew to become the second-largest European city north of the Alps. Many foreign merchants were resident in the city. Francesco Guicciardini, the Florentine envoy, stated that hundreds of ships would pass in a day, and 2,000 carts entered the city each week. Portuguese ships laden with pepper and cinnamon would unload their cargo. According to Luc-Normand Tellier "It is estimated that the port of Antwerp was earning the Spanish crown seven times more revenues than the Spanish colonization of the Americas".

Without a long-distance merchant fleet, and governed by an oligarchy of banker-aristocrats forbidden to engage in trade, the economy of Antwerp was foreign-controlled, which made the city very cosmopolitan, with merchants and traders from Venice, Genoa, Ragusa, Spain and Portugal. Antwerp had a policy of toleration, which attracted a large crypto-Jewish community composed of migrants from Spain and Portugal.

Antwerp experienced three booms during its golden age: the first based on the pepper market, a second launched by American silver coming from Seville (ending with the bankruptcy of Spain in 1557), and a third boom, after the stabilizing Treaty of Cateau-Cambresis in 1559, based on the textiles industry. At the beginning of the 16th century, Antwerp accounted for 40% of world trade. The boom-and-bust cycles and inflationary cost-of-living squeezed less-skilled workers. In the century after 1541, the city's economy and population declined dramatically. The Portuguese merchants left in 1549, and there was much less trade in English cloth. Numerous financial bankruptcies began around 1557. Amsterdam replaced Antwerp as the major trading centre for the region.

==== Reformation era ====
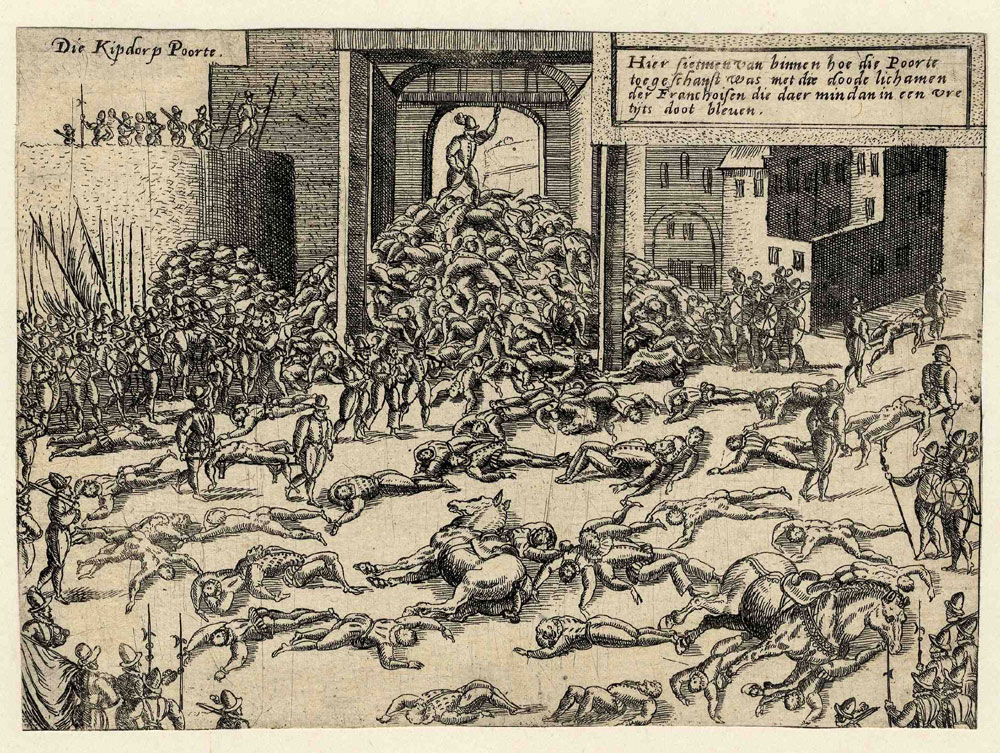
Sack of Antwerp in 1576, in which about 7,000 people died

The religious revolution of the Reformation erupted in violent riots in August 1566, as in other parts of the Low Countries. The regent Margaret, Duchess of Parma, was swept aside when Philip II sent the Duke of Alba at the head of an army the following summer. When the Dutch revolt against Spain broke out in 1568, commercial trading between Antwerp and the Spanish port of Bilbao collapsed and became impossible. On 4 November 1576, Spanish soldiers sacked the city during the so-called Sack of Antwerp: 8,000 citizens were massacred, several houses burnt down, and over £2 million sterling of damage was done.

==== Dutch revolt ====
Subsequently, the city joined the Union of Utrecht in 1579 and became the capital of the Dutch Revolt. In 1585, Alessandro Farnese, Duke of Parma and Piacenza, captured it after a long siege and as part of the terms of surrender its Protestant citizens were given two years to settle their affairs before quitting the city. Most went to the United Provinces in the north, starting the Dutch Golden Age. Antwerp's banking was controlled for a generation by Genoa, and Amsterdam became the new trading centre.

=== 17th–19th centuries ===
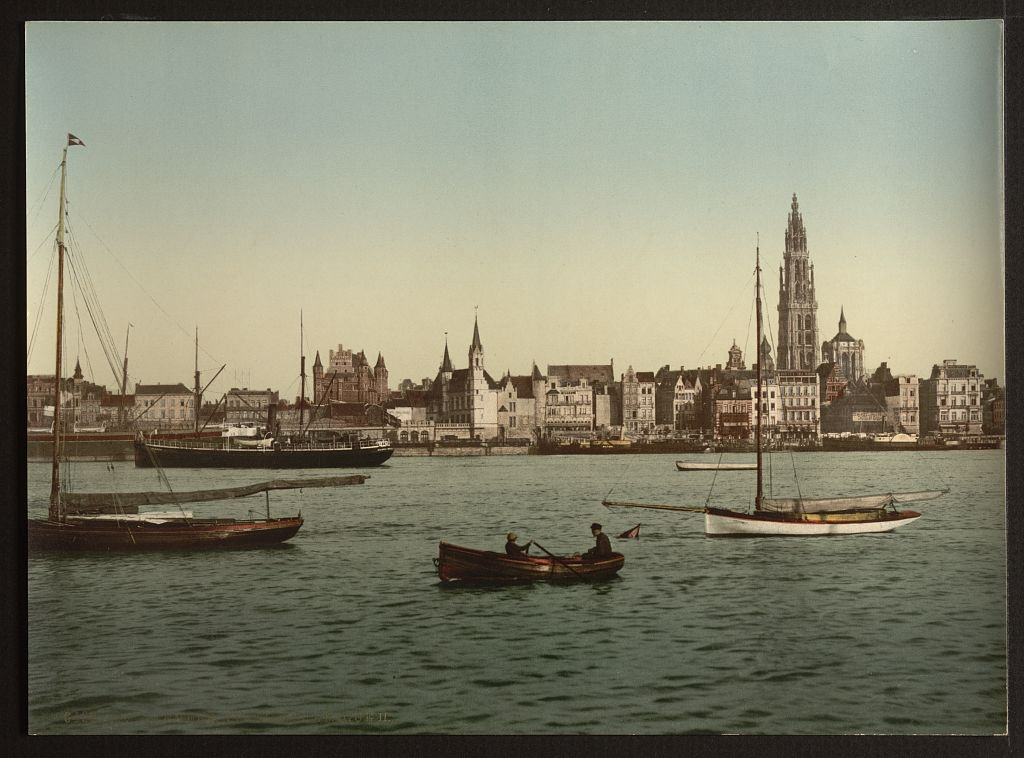
Antwerp from the left bank of the Scheldt, c. 1890–1900

The recognition of the independence of the United Provinces by the Treaty of Münster in 1648 stipulated that the Scheldt should be closed to navigation, which destroyed Antwerp's trading activities. This impediment remained in force until 1863, although the provisions were relaxed during French rule from 1795 to 1814, and also during the time Belgium formed part of the Kingdom of the United Netherlands (1815 to 1830). Antwerp had reached the lowest point in its fortunes in 1800, and its population had sunk to under 40,000, when Napoleon, realizing its strategic importance, assigned funds to enlarge the harbour by constructing a new dock (still named the Bonaparte Dock), an access-lock and mole, and deepening the Scheldt to allow larger ships to approach Antwerp. Napoleon hoped that by making Antwerp's harbour the finest in Europe he would be able to counter the Port of London and hamper British growth. However, he was defeated at the Battle of Waterloo before he could see the plan through. In 1830, the city was captured by the Belgian insurgents, but the citadel continued to be held by a Dutch garrison under General David Hendrik Chassé. For a time, Chassé subjected the town to periodic bombardment which inflicted much damage, and at the end of 1832, the citadel itself was besieged by the French Northern Army commanded by Marechal Gerard. During this attack, the town was further damaged. In December 1832, after a gallant defence, Chassé made an honourable surrender, ending the Siege of Antwerp (1832).

Later that century, a double ring of Brialmont Fortresses was constructed some 10 km (6 mi) from the city centre, as Antwerp was considered vital for the survival of the young Belgian state. And in 1894 Antwerp presented itself to the world via a World's Fair attended by 3 million.

=== 20th century ===
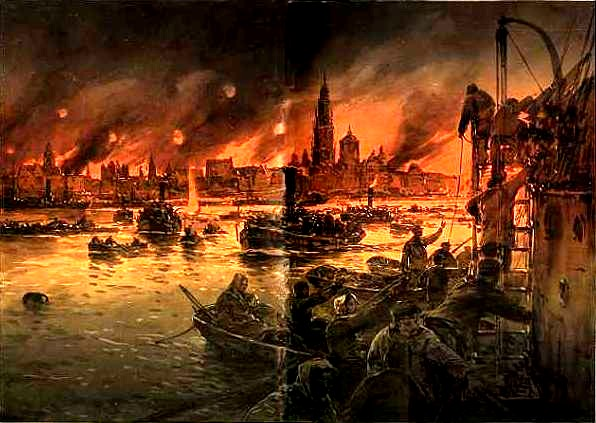
The German bombardment of Antwerp, October 1914, by Willy Stöwer

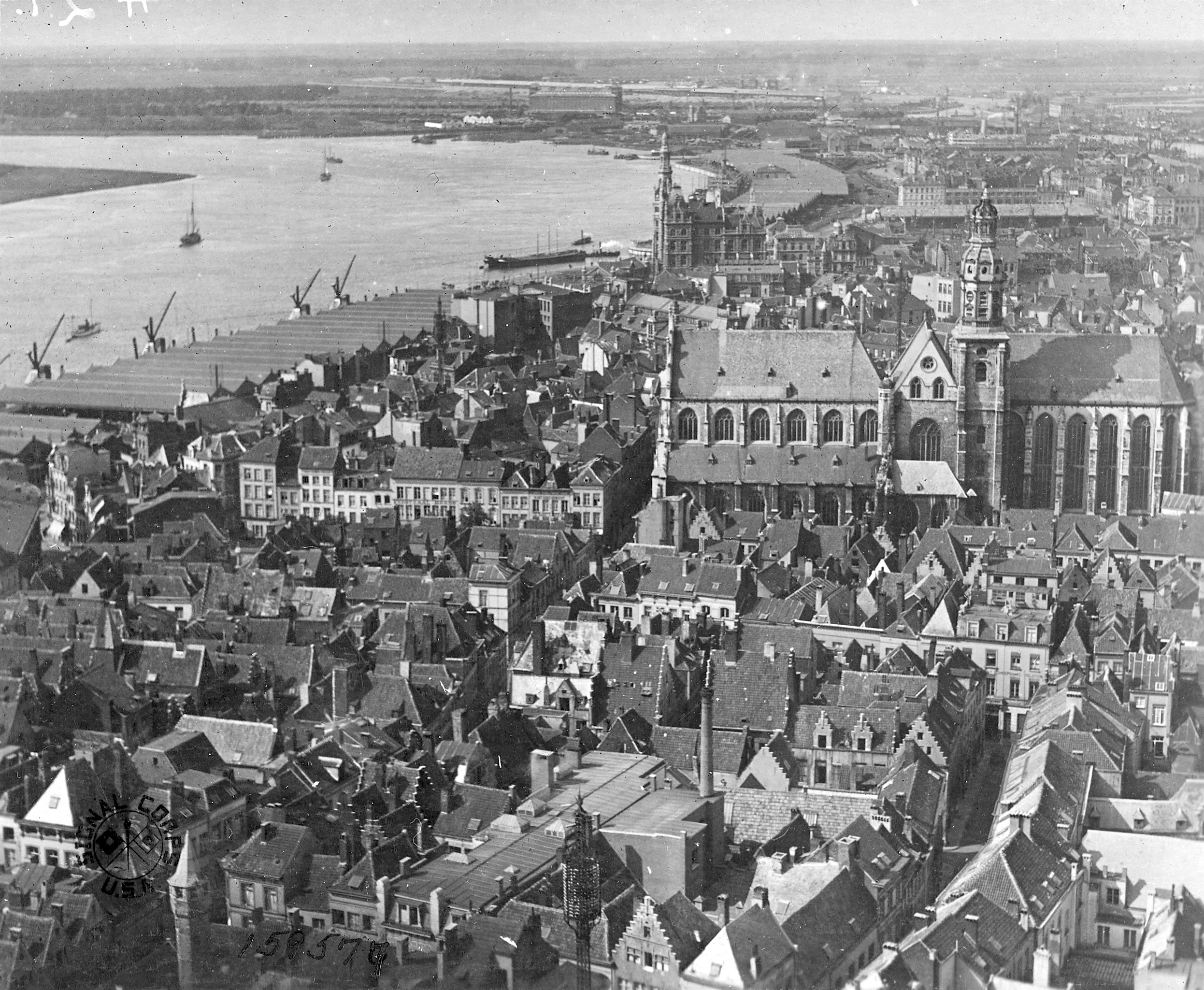
Aerial view of Antwerp in June 1919

Antwerp was the first city to host the World Gymnastics Championships, in 1903. During World War I, the city became the fallback point of the Belgian Army after the defeat at Liège. The Siege of Antwerp lasted for 11 days, but the city was taken after heavy fighting by the German Army, and the Belgians were forced to retreat westwards. Antwerp remained under German occupation until the Armistice. A few years later, Antwerp hosted the 1920 Summer Olympics.

During World War II, the city was an important strategic target because of its port. It was occupied by Germany on 18 May 1940 and liberated by the British 11th Armoured Division on 4 September 1944. After this, the Germans attempted to destroy the Port of Antwerp, which was used by the Allies to bring new material ashore. Thousands of Rheinbote, V-1 and V-2 missiles were fired (more V-2s than used on all other targets during the entire war combined), causing severe damage to the city but failed to destroy the port due to poor accuracy. After the war, Antwerp, which had already had a sizeable Jewish population before the war, once again became a major European centre of Haredi (and particularly Hasidic) Orthodox Judaism.

A Ten-Year Plan for the port of Antwerp (1956–1965) expanded and modernized the port's infrastructure with national funding to build a set of canal docks. The broader aim was to facilitate the growth of the north-eastern Antwerp metropolitan region, which attracted new industry based on a flexible and strategic implementation of the project as a co-production between various authorities and private parties. The plan succeeded in extending the linear layout along the Scheldt river by connecting new satellite communities to the main strip.

Starting in the 1990s, Antwerp rebranded itself as a world-class fashion centre. Emphasizing the avant-garde, it tried to compete with London, Milan, New York and Paris. It emerged from organized tourism and mega-cultural events.

== Districts ==
The municipality comprises the city of Antwerp proper and several towns. It is divided into ten entities (districts):

#	name	surface (km^{2})	inhabitants	population density	population density in residential areas	Flag
1	Antwerp	83.18	198,784	2,390	11,959	Flag of Antwerp (district)
2	Berchem	5.70	43,325	7,603	10,717	Flag of Berchem, Antwerp
3	Berendrecht-Zandvliet-Lillo	52.43	9,962	190	3,315	Flag of Berchem, Antwerp
4	Borgerhout	3.90	46,424	11,904	17,026	Blason ville be Borgerhout
5	Borsbeek	3.90	10,949	2,800		Flag of Borsbeek
6	Deurne	13.03	82,270	6,315	11,932	Flag of Deurne
7	Ekeren	13.48	28,720	2,131	4,614	Ekeren vlag
8	Hoboken	10.52	41,352	3,932	8,451	Hoboken vlag
9	Merksem	8.42	45,929	5,457	10,691	Flag of Merksem (district)
10	Wilrijk	13.71	41,916	3,057	7,026	Wilrijk vlag

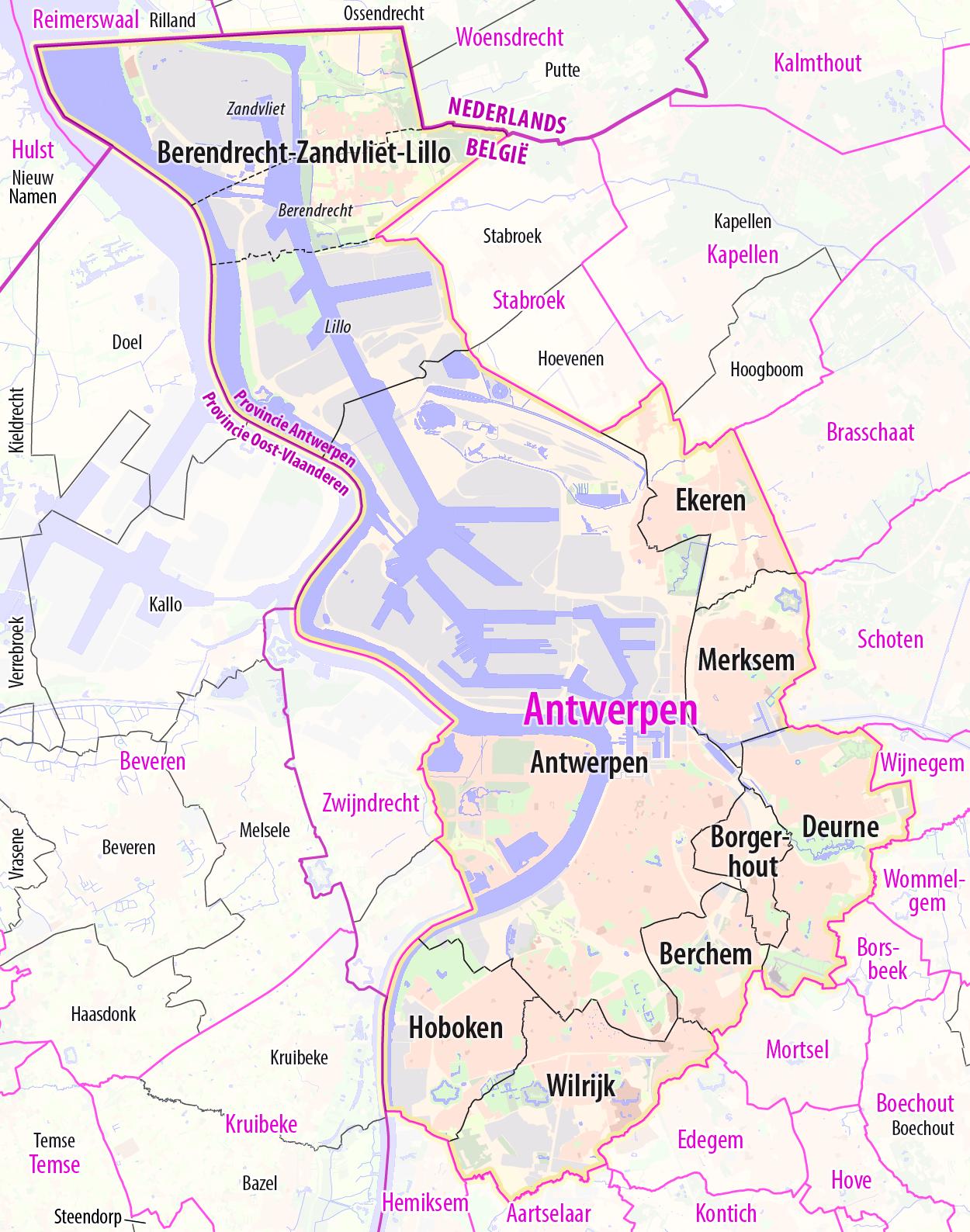

In 1958, in preparation of the 10-year development plan for the Port of Antwerp, the municipalities of Berendrecht-Zandvliet-Lillo were integrated into the city territory and lost their administrative independence. During the 1983 merger of municipalities, conducted by the Belgian government as an administrative simplification, the municipalities of Berchem, Borgerhout, Deurne, Ekeren, Hoboken, Merksem and Wilrijk were merged into the city. At that time the city was also divided into the districts mentioned above. Simultaneously, districts received an appointed district council; later district councils became elected bodies.

The neighbouring municipality of Borsbeek declared the intention to become the tenth district of the city of Antwerp. Since January 2025, Borsbeek has been a district of the city of Antwerp.

With the exception of Ekeren and Berendrecht-Zandvliet-Lillo, all the districts form together one contiguous inhabited area. The former town halls have been converted into district halls and the former town centres are now local main streets within the larger urban agglomeration.

== Neighbourhoods ==
Antwerp consists of the following neighbourhoods. For a few of them, the postal code has become a cultural reference:

The inner city - 2000

Encompassing the area between the river and the Spanish fortification walls, this is the historical heart of Antwerp. On the place of the Spanish walls is now an avenue called de Leien in Dutch or den Boulevard in the local dialect. Tourist sights such as the Cathedral are located here, but also more mundane places.

Quarters in the inner city are:

- Historical centre
- Meir
- Schipperskwartier
- Quartier Latin
- University quarter
- het Zuid
- nieuw Zuid
- het Eilandje

Antwerpen-Noord - 2060

Antwerpen-Noord or synonymously 2060 is a densely populated part of the city, and the most diverse one as well.

- Seefhoek
- Stuivenberg
- Amandus-Atheneum
- Dam

Antwerpen intra-muros - 2018

This is not a neighbourhood by itself, but is the postal code for the remaining quarters of the district that lie between de Leien and the ringway.

- Statiekwartier
- Diamond square
- Groen Kwartier
- Haringrode
- Zurenborg
- Brederode
- Klein-Antwerpen
- Kievit quarter
- Harmonie

Antwerpen extra-muros - 2020

- Kiel
- Tentoonstellingswijk
- Middelheim (the border with the district of Wilrijk runs rights through this quarter)

Antwerpen - 2030

- Luchtbal
- Not a quarter, but a significant amount of territory here is industrial and uninhabited port terrains.

Linkeroever - 2050

United with the city in 1923, Linkeroever ("Left bank") consists of the former polders of Zwijndrecht and Burcht.

Berchem - 2600

Antwerp-Berchem is a major transportation hub.

== Cityscape and architecture ==
Antwerp's architecture is a blend of old and new, with a cultural heritage spanning from the Gothic and Renaissance periods to contemporary designs. In the 16th century, the city was noted for the wealth of its citizens (Antwerpia nummis). The houses of these wealthy merchants and manufacturers have been preserved throughout the city. However, fire has destroyed several old buildings, such as the house of the Hanseatic League on the northern quays, in 1891. During World War II, the city also suffered considerable damage from V-bombs. Here are some of the most notable examples of Antwerp's diverse architecture:

- The Port House, designed by Zaha Hadid, is a contemporary landmark that juxtaposes a restored neoclassical building with a futuristic glass-clad extension.
- The Provincial Government Building, designed by Xaveer De Geyter Architects, is a unique triangular-shaped building with a natural stone façade located in the historic city centre.
- De Singel, a cultural centre with a modernist design, features a mix of glass and concrete and is considered an architectural marvel.
- The Palace of Justice, designed by Richard Rogers, is a modern building with a prominent dome and makes extensive use of glass and steel.
- The MAS Museum, with its distinctive red sandstone façade, is a contemporary building that explores Antwerp's rich maritime history.
- The Zurenborg neighbourhood is known for its Art Nouveau architecture, featuring intricate details, colourful mosaics, and stained glass windows.
- Maison Guiette is a residential building designed by the Swiss-French architect Le Corbusier in collaboration with the Belgian architect Paul De Meyer in 1926–1927. Maison Guiette is considered an early example of Le Corbusier's work in Europe. It is now listed as a UNESCO World Heritage site and is recognised as an important example of modernist architecture.
- De Boerentoren, or "The Farmer's Tower", is a historic Art Deco skyscraper that was once the tallest building in Europe.
- The Bourla Theatre, with its Neo-Classical style, is a historic theatre that dates back to the 19th century.
- The Hendrik Conscience Heritage Library is a historic library. The library was established in 1481 and is one of the oldest and most extensive heritage libraries in Belgium. It is home to over 1.5 million books, manuscripts, and other documents related to the history and culture of Flanders.
- The Royal Museum of Fine Arts, with its Neo-Classical style, houses a vast collection of Flemish art from the 14th to the 20th century.
- Antwerp Central Station, a beautiful Beaux-Arts railway station, is one of the most impressive examples of railway architecture in Europe.
- The Sint-Annatunnel, also known as the Voetgangerstunnel, is a 572-meter-long tunnel. It was opened in 1933 and was designed by engineer Emiel Van Averbeke. The tunnel connects the banks of the Scheldt River, linking the historic city centre with the Left Bank neighbourhood. It is primarily made of reinforced concrete and features an Art Deco style interior design with ceramic tiles, ornamental lighting fixtures, and decorative panels. One of its unique features is the wooden escalator, which has been in operation since the tunnel's opening. Today, the Voetgangerstunnel is a popular tourist attraction and a key transportation link for commuters and visitors to Antwerp.
- Nieuw Zuid (New South) neighbourhood. Located next to the river on the site of abandoned railway tracks, Nieuw Zuid is being designed as a sustainable green neighbourhood. The project, which will not be finished until 2030, includes buildings by acclaimed international architects such as Max Dudler, Stefano Boeri, Peter Zumthor, Shigeru Ban and Kazuyo Sejima.

Antwerp is also home to a wealth of historic Gothic, Baroque and Renaissance-style buildings, such as the Antwerp City Hall, the Cathedral of Our Lady, the St. Paul's Church, the St. James' Church, the St. Andrew's Church, the St. Charles Borromeo Church and the Vleeshuis Museum.

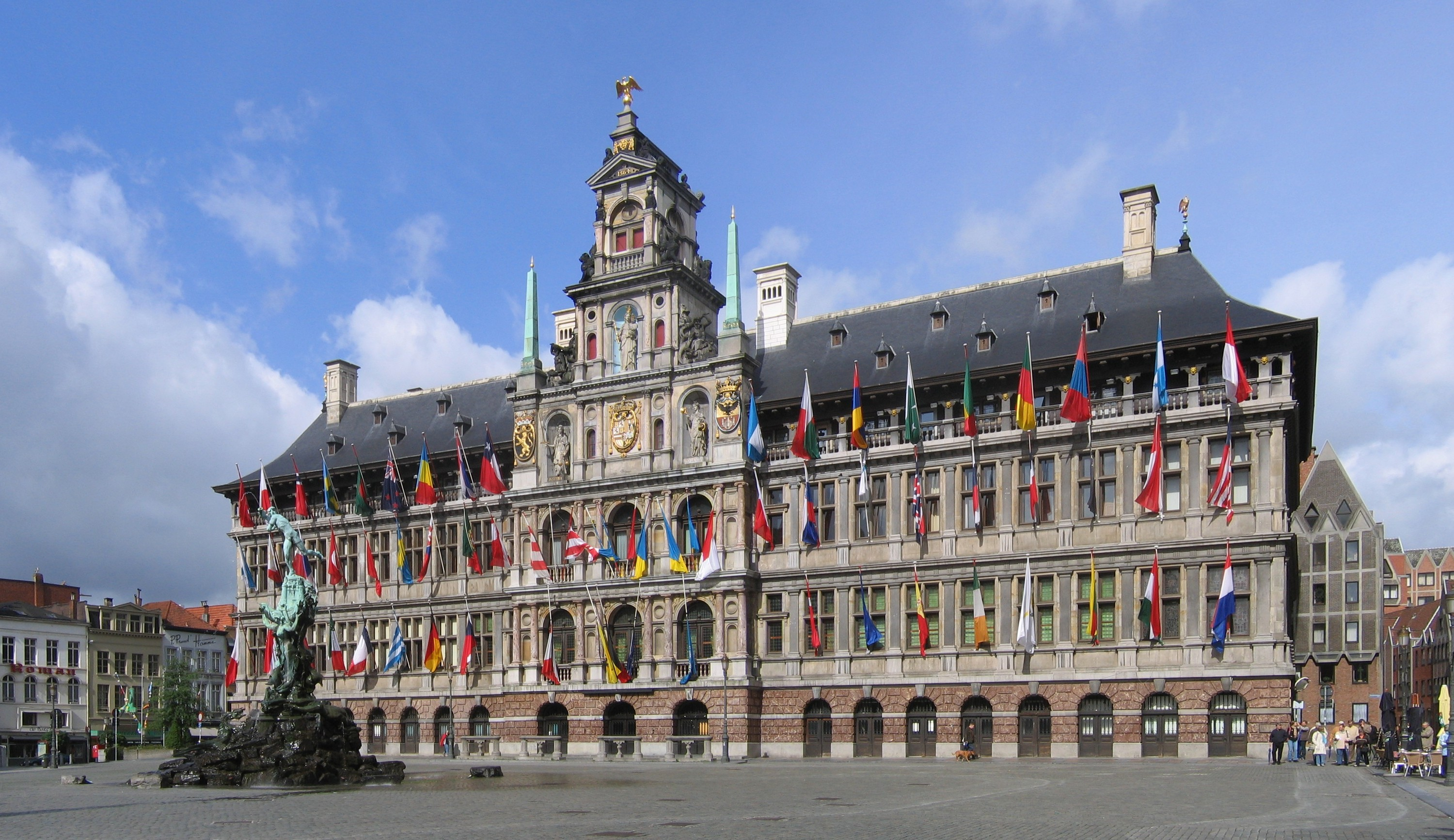
Antwerp City Hall at the Grote Markt

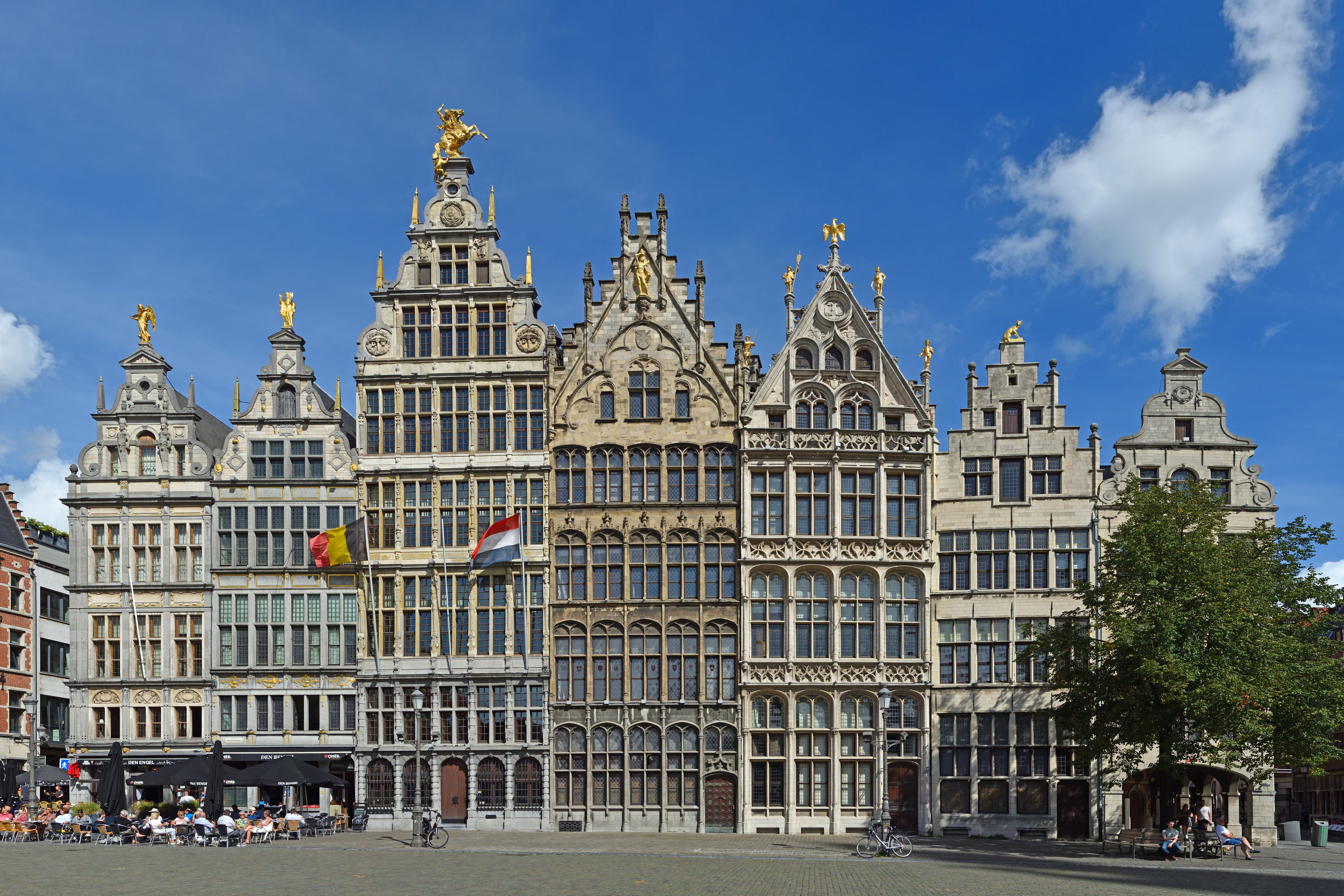
16th-century guildhalls at the Grote Markt

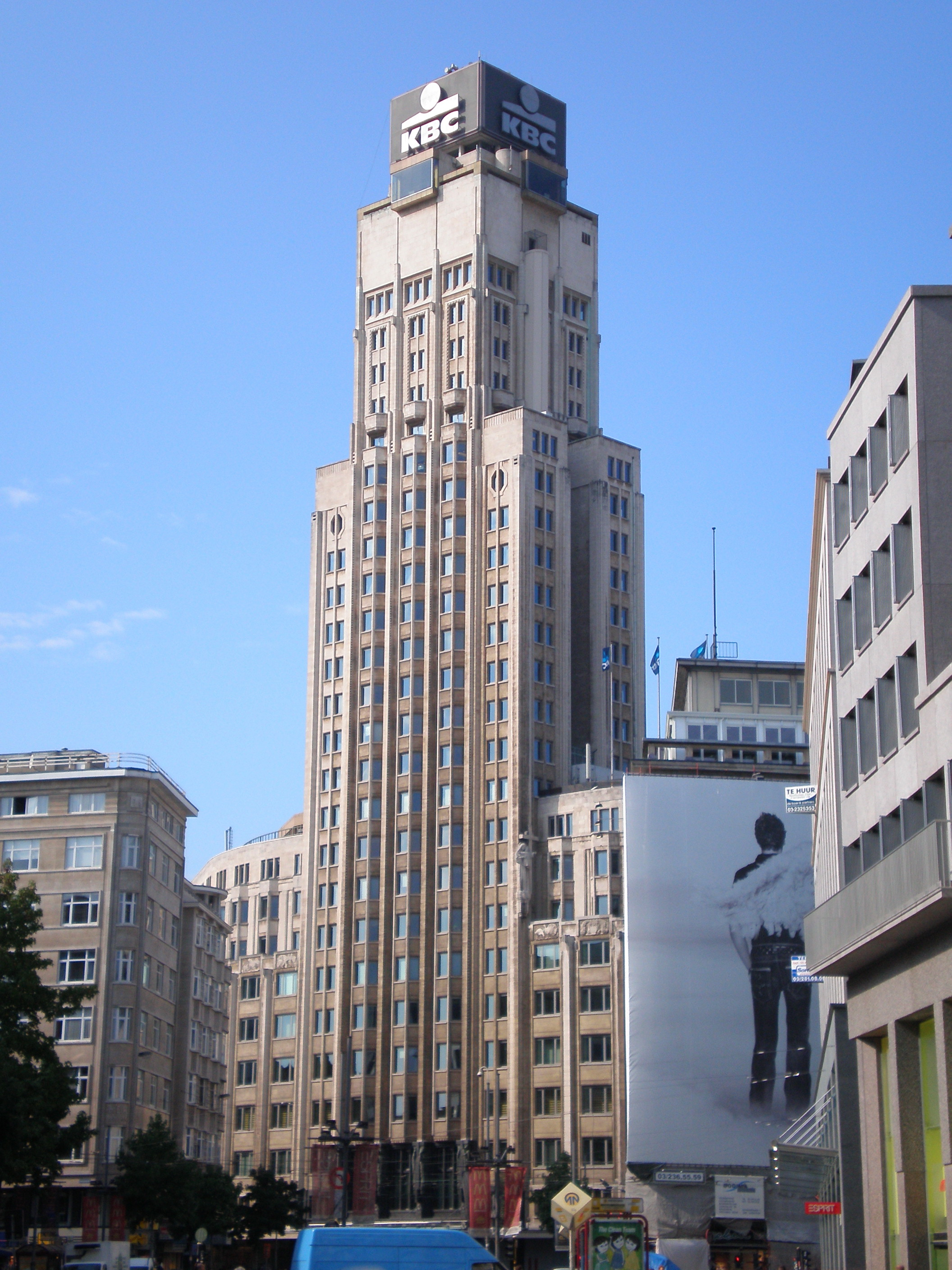
Boerentoren

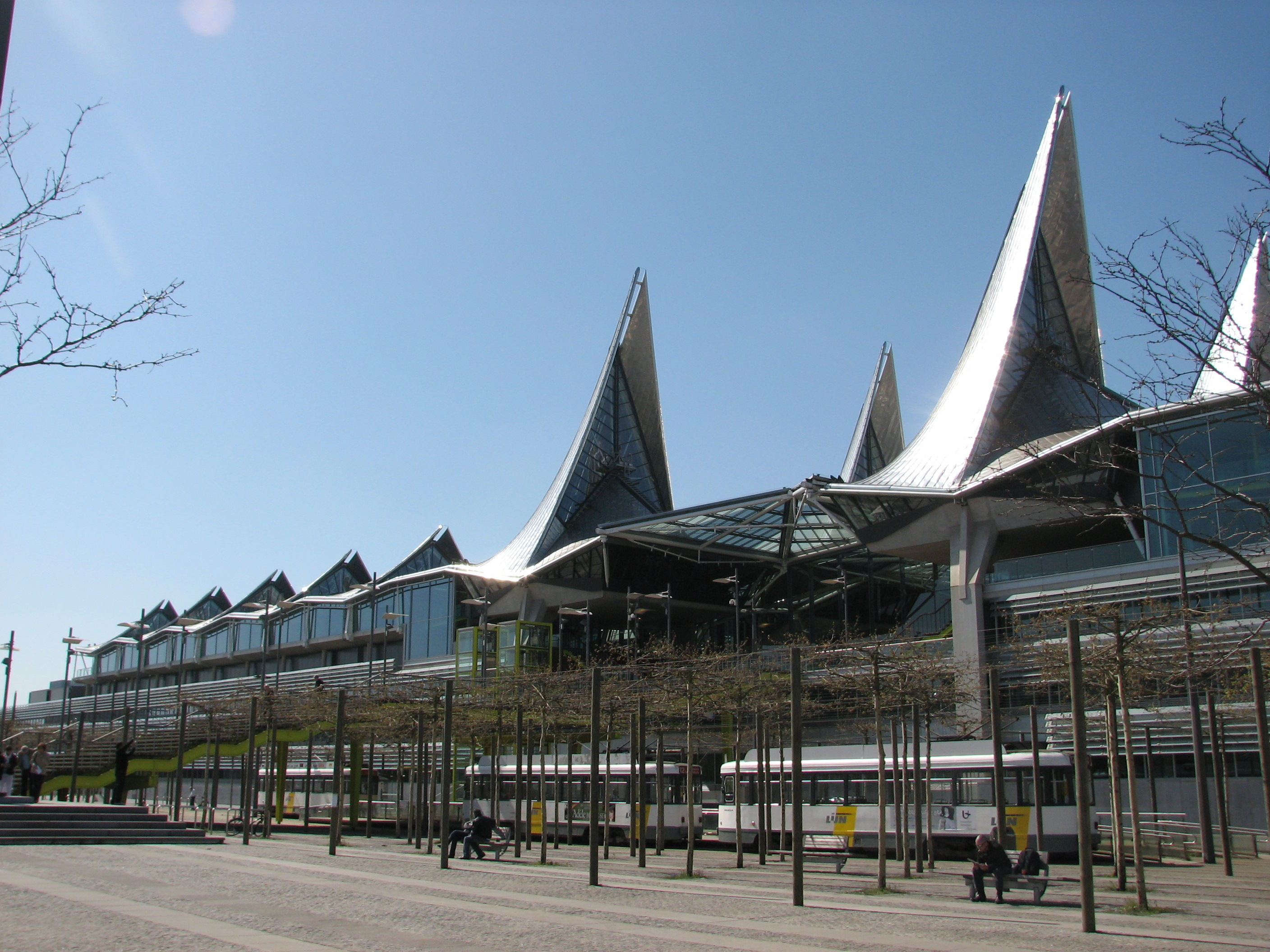
Palace of Justice

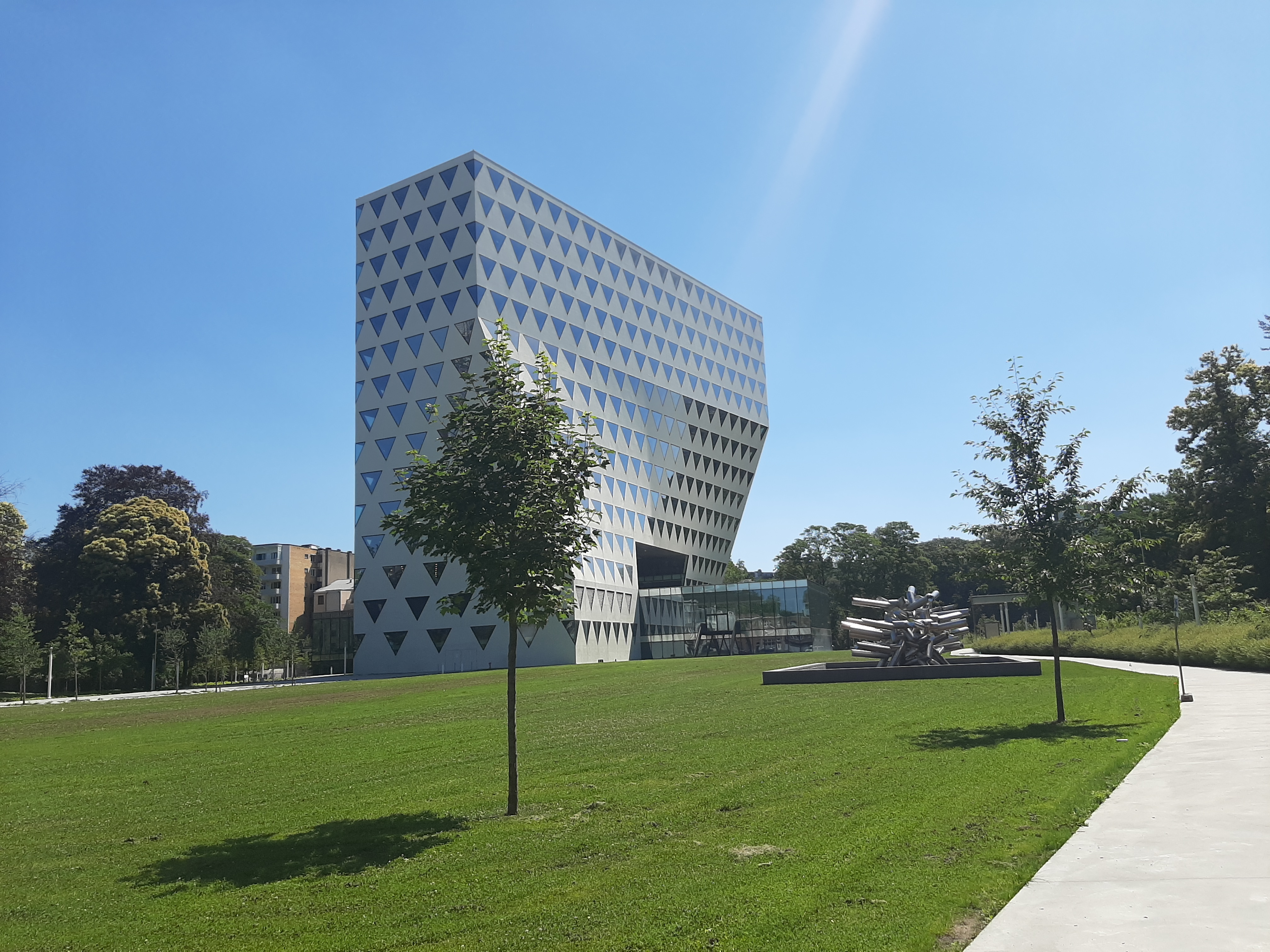
Provincial Government Building

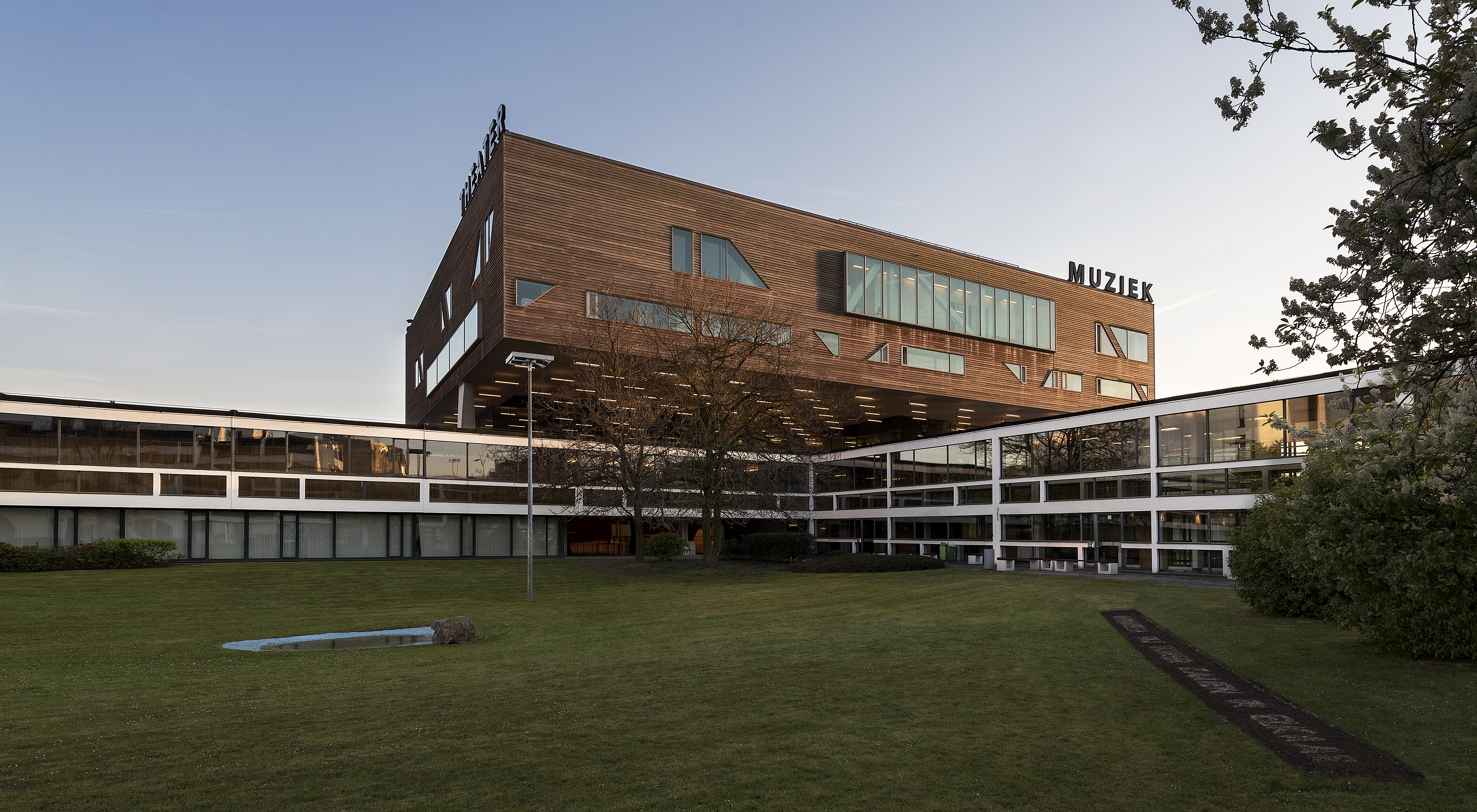
De Singel

== Parks and recreational areas ==
Antwerp offers a diverse range of parks and recreational areas for locals and tourists to explore. One of the most popular attractions is the Antwerp Zoo. It opened on 21 July 1843, making it one of the oldest and most famous zoos in the world. The zoo covers an area of 10 hectares and is home to more than 5,000 animals from over 950 species. The zoo is located right next to Antwerp Central Station on the Koningin Astridplein. Antwerp Zoo has played its role in preservation and breeding programmes for several endangered species, including the okapi, the Przewalski horse, the Congo peafowl, the bonobo, the golden-headed lion tamarin, the European otter, and the Knysna seahorse. They take part in the European Endangered Species Programme. On 1 January 1983 the entire park (architecture and garden) was listed as a monument. Other well-known parks include:

- Nachtegalen Park with several adjacent parks south of Antwerp. The area is 90 hectares in total. The parks were all built around a castle and were acquired by the municipality of Antwerp in 1910. The parks consist of Den Brandt (21 ha), Vogelenzang (40 ha), and Middelheim Park (24 ha) which is famous for its open-air sculpture museum that features over 400 works of art. The park also hosts a variety of outdoor concerts and festivals throughout the year, making it a popular destination for visitors.
- The Rivierenhof is a large public park located in the district of Deurne. The park covers an area of 130 hectares and features beautiful gardens, lakes, ponds, and walking paths. The Rivierenhof park was originally designed in the 1920s as a recreational park for the working class, and has since become a beloved green space for both locals and tourists.
- Park Spoor Noord is a large urban park located in the northern part of Antwerp, Belgium. The park covers an area of approximately 24 hectares and was built on the site of a former railway yard. It is a popular destination for locals and tourists alike and features a wide range of amenities and attractions, including playgrounds, sports fields, a skate park, a petanque court, a community garden, and several restaurants and cafés.
- The Stadspark is a public park located in the centre of Antwerp. It was designed by the landscape architect Édouard Keilig and opened in 1869. The park covers an area of approximately 14 hectares.
- The Botanic Garden is another popular destination for visitors, boasting a wide range of exotic plants and flowers from around the world.
- The Boekenbergpark is a public park located in the district of Deurne. It is notable for its unique outdoor swimming pool, which is filled with filtered rainwater. The park itself covers an area of about 12 hectares and includes walking paths, gardens, and playgrounds. It was designed to be an eco-friendly and sustainable space.
- Te Boelaerpark is a public park located in the district of Borgerhout. The park covers an area of 8.2 hectares and is a popular recreational area for locals and visitors alike.
- Hobokense Polder, is a nature reserve located in the district of Hoboken. It covers an area of about 170 hectares and consists of meadows, fields, wetlands, and forests. The area was originally used for agricultural purposes, but it was transformed into a nature reserve in the 1990s.
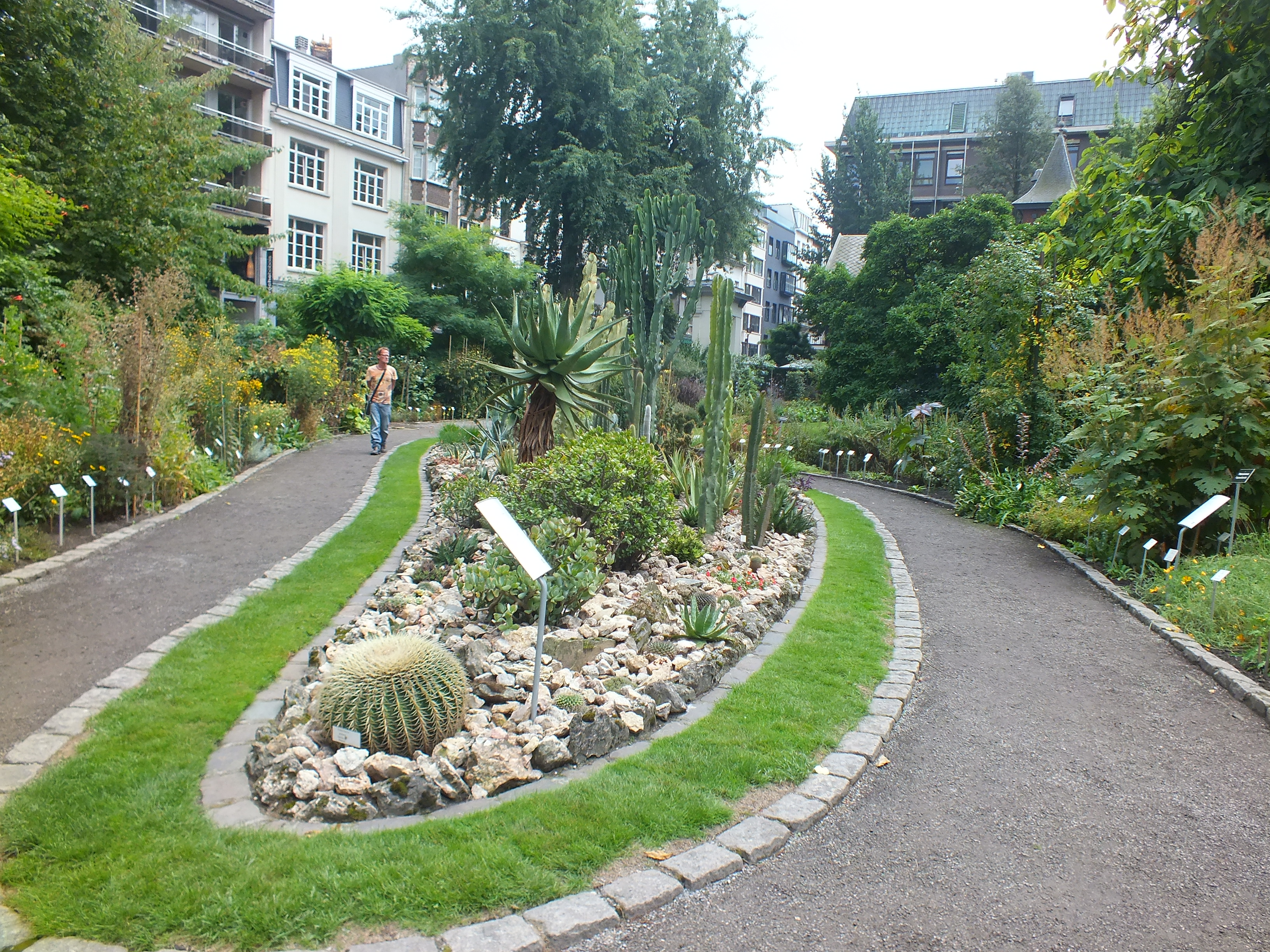
Den Botaniek

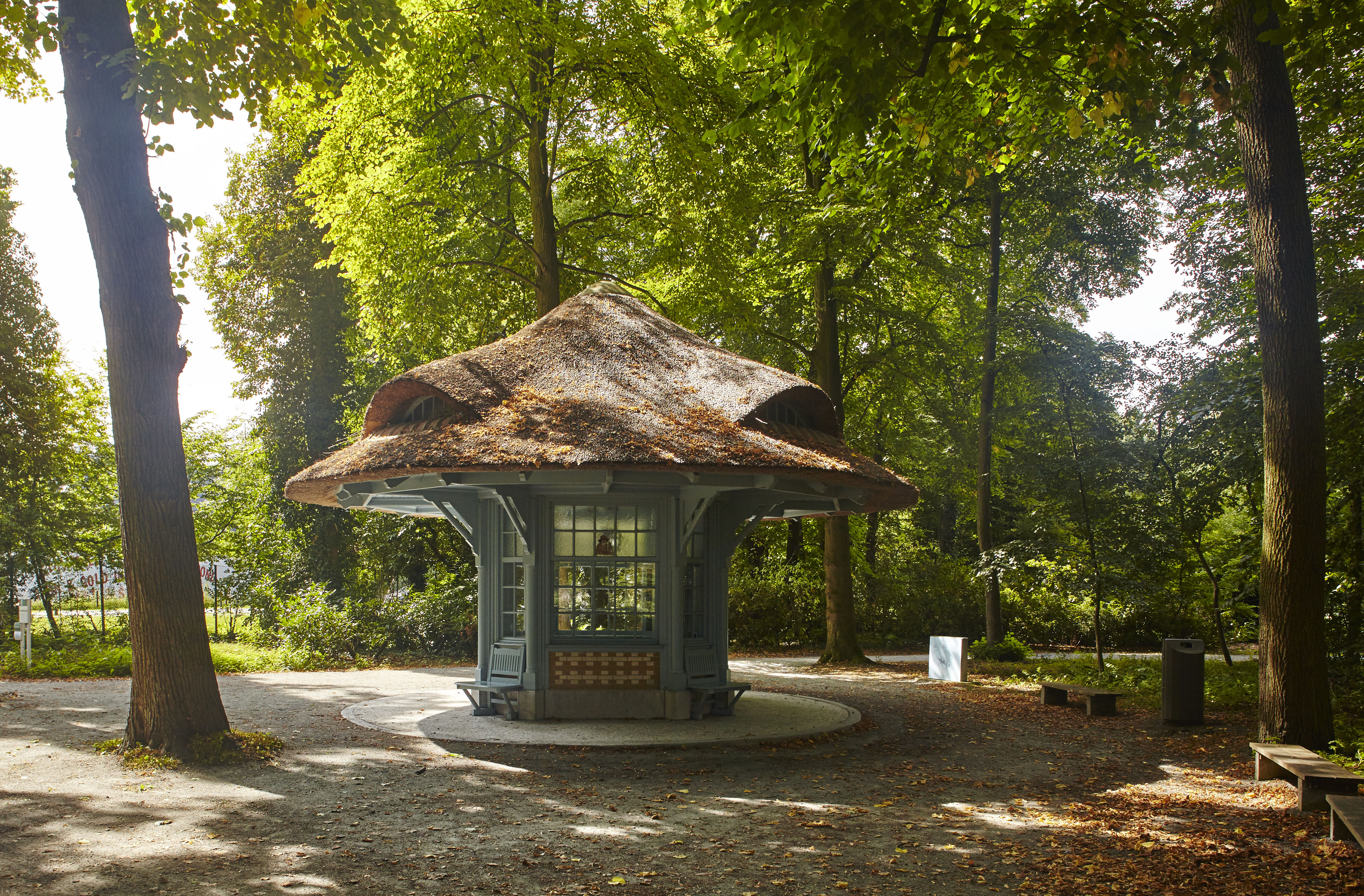
Nachtegalenpark

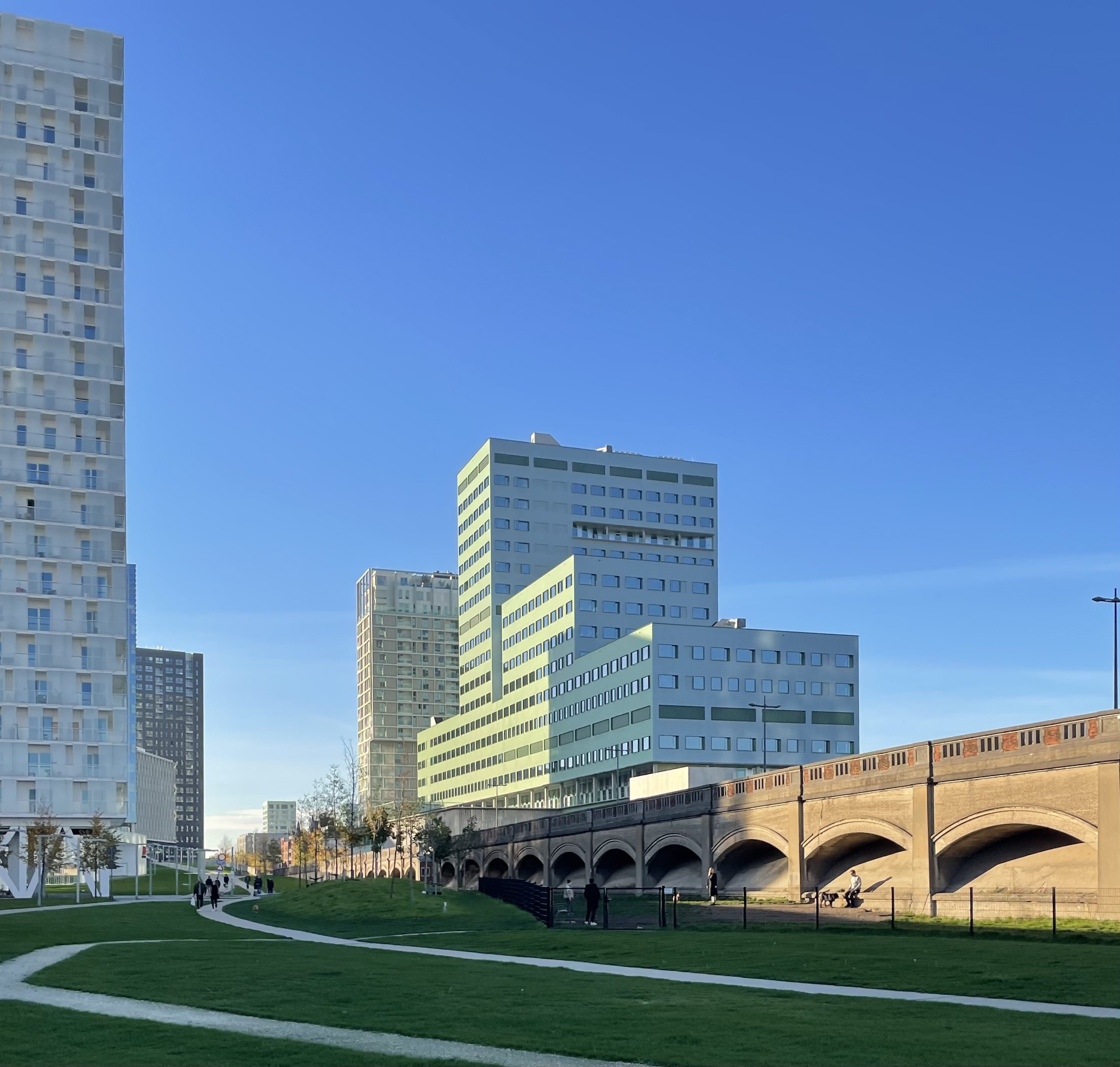
Kop Park Spoor Noord

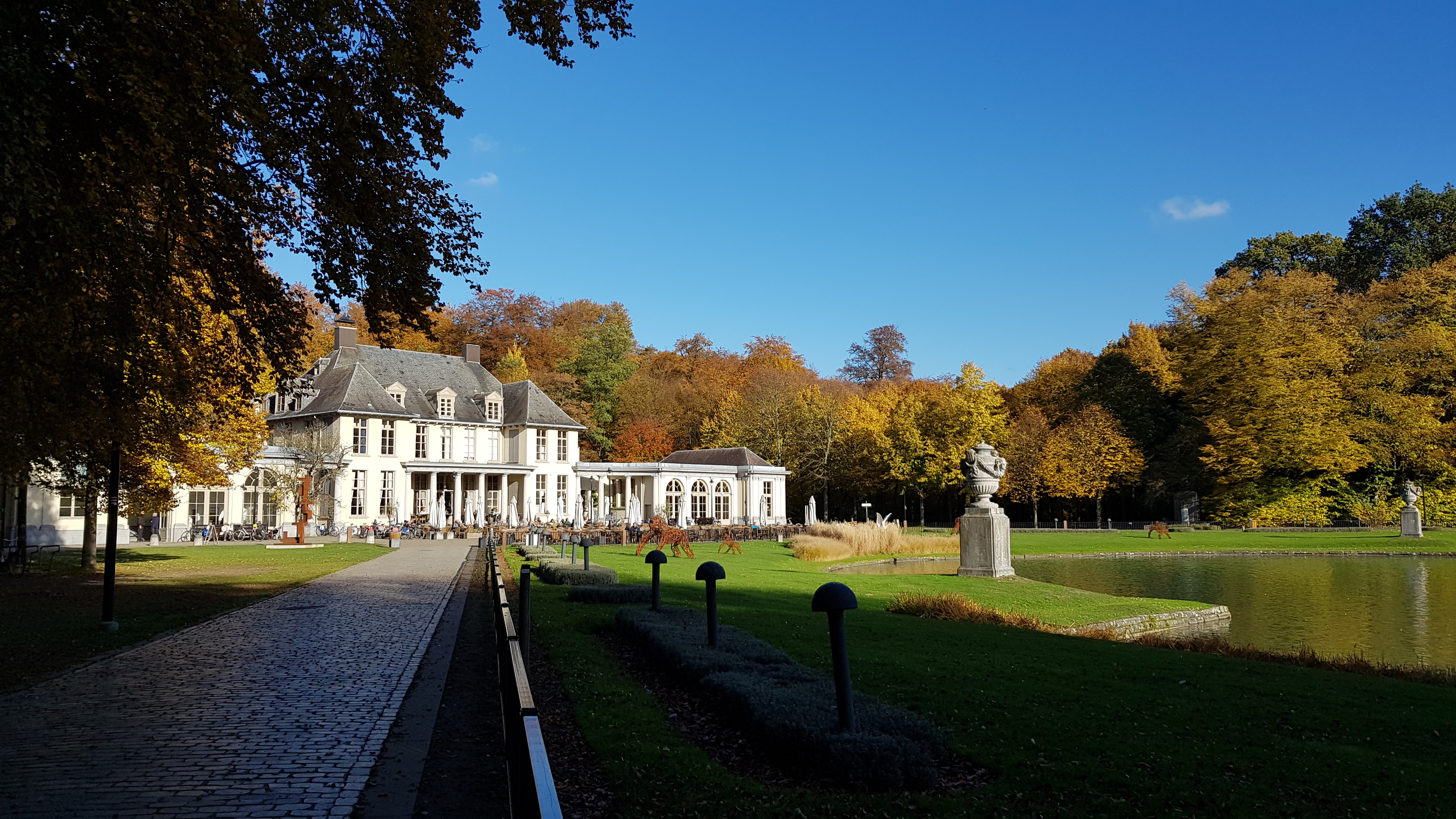
Rivierenhof Deurne

== Climate ==
Antwerp has an oceanic climate (Köppen: Cfb), with cool winters, warm summers and frequent, though light, precipitation throughout the year. Due to the influence of the Gulf Stream, Antwerp has a relatively mild climate throughout the year, with the average temperature fluctuating between 4 °C (39 °F) and 19 °C (66 °F) throughout the year.

Climate data for Antwerp (1991−2020 normals, extremes 1949−present)
Month	Jan	Feb	Mar	Apr	May	Jun	Jul	Aug	Sep	Oct	Nov	Dec	Year
Record high °C (°F)	16.0 (60.8)	19.3 (66.7)	24.6 (76.3)	28.7 (83.7)	32.9 (91.2)	36.7 (98.1)	40.4 (104.7)	37.0 (98.6)	35.0 (95.0)	26.2 (79.2)	20.3 (68.5)	17.2 (63.0)	40.4 (104.7)
Mean daily maximum °C (°F)	6.8 (44.2)	7.7 (45.9)	11.2 (52.2)	15.3 (59.5)	18.9 (66.0)	21.6 (70.9)	23.6 (74.5)	23.6 (74.5)	20.1 (68.2)	15.4 (59.7)	10.5 (50.9)	7.2 (45.0)	15.2 (59.4)
Daily mean °C (°F)	4.0 (39.2)	4.4 (39.9)	7.1 (44.8)	10.3 (50.5)	14.0 (57.2)	16.9 (62.4)	18.9 (66.0)	18.6 (65.5)	15.5 (59.9)	11.5 (52.7)	7.4 (45.3)	4.6 (40.3)	11.1 (52.0)
Mean daily minimum °C (°F)	1.3 (34.3)	1.2 (34.2)	3.0 (37.4)	5.2 (41.4)	9.1 (48.4)	12.2 (54.0)	14.2 (57.6)	13.7 (56.7)	10.8 (51.4)	7.6 (45.7)	4.4 (39.9)	2.0 (35.6)	7.1 (44.8)
Record low °C (°F)	−18.5 (−1.3)	−18.1 (−0.6)	−10.8 (12.6)	−4.9 (23.2)	−2.6 (27.3)	1.7 (35.1)	5.0 (41.0)	4.6 (40.3)	1.1 (34.0)	−6.1 (21.0)	−9.5 (14.9)	−16.1 (3.0)	−18.5 (−1.3)
Average precipitation mm (inches)	70.0 (2.76)	62.8 (2.47)	54.2 (2.13)	43.1 (1.70)	59.8 (2.35)	76.9 (3.03)	82.3 (3.24)	84.0 (3.31)	75.6 (2.98)	72.6 (2.86)	80.7 (3.18)	90.9 (3.58)	852.9 (33.58)
Average precipitation days (≥ 1.0 mm)	12.6	11.6	10.5	8.8	9.8	10.2	10.5	10.8	10.1	11.1	12.9	14.1	132.8
Mean monthly sunshine hours	62	78	136	192	221	220	225	212	164	117	66	51	1,743
Source 1: Royal Meteorological Institute
Source 2: Temperature estreme in Toscoma (extremes)

== Fortifications ==
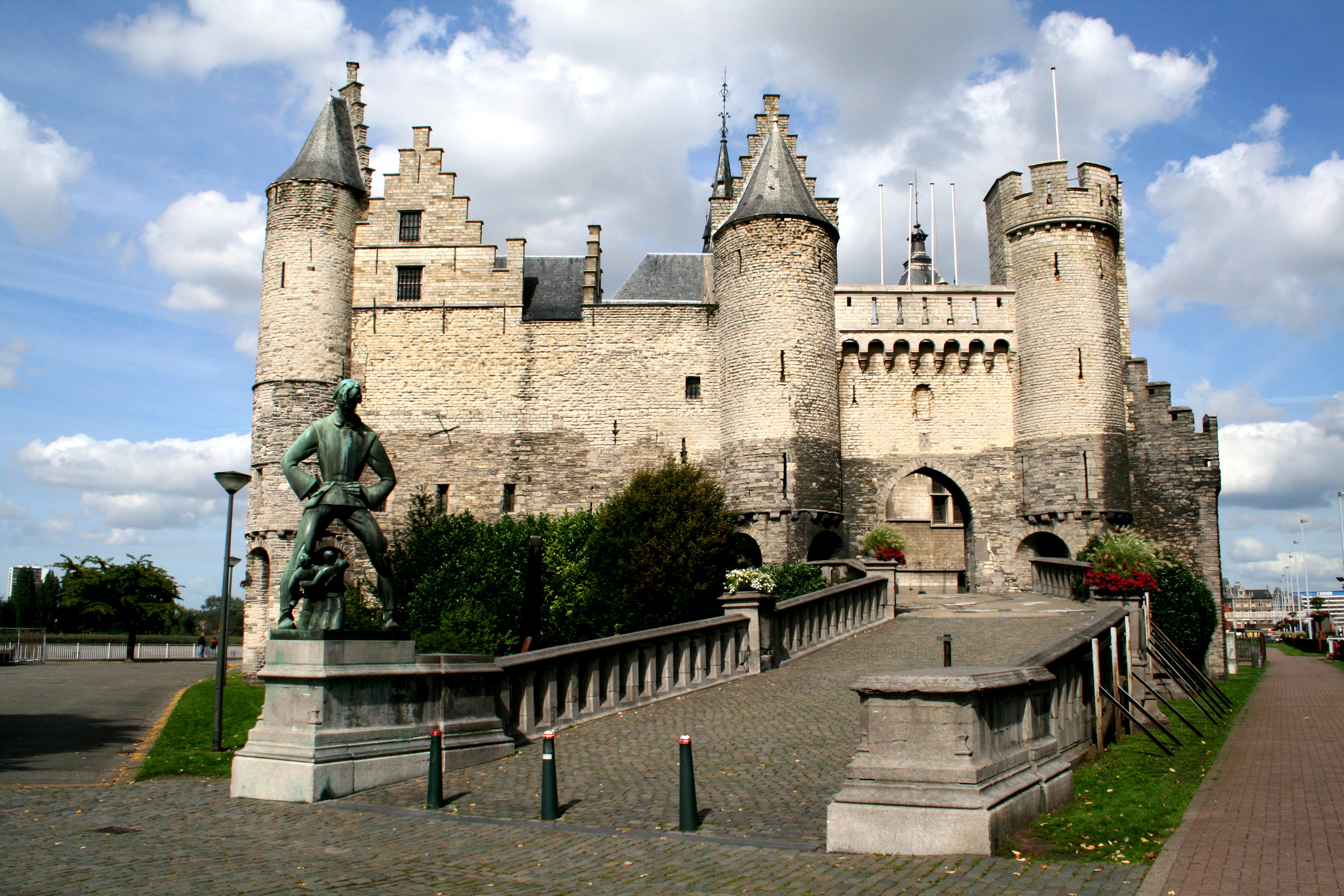
Het Steen (literally: 'The Stone')

Although Antwerp was formerly a fortified city, hardly anything remains of the former enceinte, only some remains of the city wall can be seen near the Vleeshuis museum at the corner of Bloedberg and Burchtgracht. Steen castle on the Scheldt-quai is the gate wing of the demolished castle of the Dukes of Brabant. It was partly reconstructed in the 19th century.

Antwerp's development as a fortified city is documented between the 10th and the 20th century. The fortifications were developed in different phases:

- 10th century: fortification of the wharf with a wall and a ditch
- 12th and 13th century: canals (so called "vlieten" and "ruien") were made
- 16th century: Spanish fortifications
- 19th century: double ring of Brialmont forts around the city, dismantling of the Spanish fortifications
- 20th century: 1960 dismantling of the inner ring of forts, decommissioning of the outer ring of forts

== Demographics ==
Antwerp population pyramid in 2022

=== Historical population ===
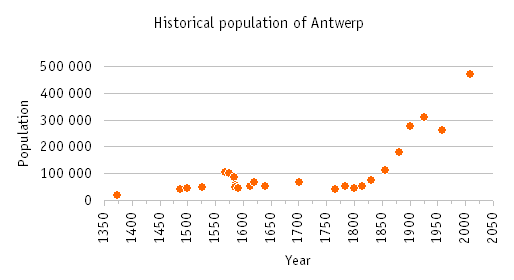
Population timeline of Antwerp

This is the population of the city of Antwerp only, not of the larger current municipality of the same name.

1374: 18,000; 1486: 40,000; 1500: around 44/49,000 inhabitants; 1526: 50,000; 1567: 105,000 (90,000 permanent residents and 15,000 "floating population", including foreign merchants and soldiers. At the time only 10 cities in Europe reached this size.); 1584: 84,000 (after the Spanish Fury, the French Fury and the Calvinist republic); 1586 (May): 60,000 (after siege); 1586 (October): 50,000; 1591: 46,000; 1612: 54,000; 1620: 66,000 (Twelve Years' Truce)	1640: 54,000 (after the Black Death epidemics); 1700: 66,000; 1765: 40,000; 1784: 51,000; 1800: 45,500; 1815: 54,000; 1830: 73,500; 1856: 111,700; 1880: 179,000; 1900: 275,100; 1925: 308,000; 1959: 260,000

=== Ethnicities and religions ===
Largest groups of foreign residents in Antwerp
Country of origin	Population 2019
Morocco	76,593
Netherlands	28,582
Turkey	25,419
Poland	12,430
Spain	9,644
Italy	6,841
India	6,229
Afghanistan	6,223
Bulgaria	4,915
Iraq	4,862

In 2010, 36% to 39% of the inhabitants of Antwerp had foreign origins. A study projected that in 2020, 55% of the population would be of immigrant background, either first, second, or third generation.

Group of origin	Year									
Group of origin	2001		2006		2011		2016		2023	
Group of origin	Number	%	Number	%	Number	%	Number	%	Number	%
Belgians with Belgian background	340,130	76.3%	316,993	68.7%	291,499	59.1%	268,317	51.9%	235,374	43.7%
Belgians with foreign background (Note: The number includes Belgian nationals who either previously were foreign nationals themselves or at least one of their parents was a foreign national.)	50,378	11.3%	85,171	18.5%	115,236	23.3%	143,009	27.6%	178,476	33.1%
Neighbouring country (Note: Countries included within this are: Germany; France; Luxembourg; the Netherlands; the United Kingdom;)	10,344	2.3%	11,911		13,387		14,820		17,132	3.2%
EU27 (excluding neighbouring country)	5,179	1.2%	6,328		7,518		9,181		12,514	2.3%
Outside EU 27	34,855	7.8%	66,932		94,331		119,008		148,830	27.6%
Non-Belgians	55,062	12.3%	59,332	12.9%	86,782	17.6%	105,716	20.4%	125,060	23.2%
Neighbouring country (Note: Countries included within this are: Germany; France; Luxembourg; the Netherlands; the United Kingdom;)	11,515	2.6%	13,385		18,810		22,588		23,253	4.3%
EU27 (excluding neighbouring country)	7,130	1.6%	9,215		18,557		28,197		33,109	6.1%
Outside EU 27	36,417	8.2%	36,732		49,415		54,931		68,698	12.7%
Total	445,570	100%	461,496	100%	493,517	100%	517,042	100%	538,910	100%

==== Jewish community ====
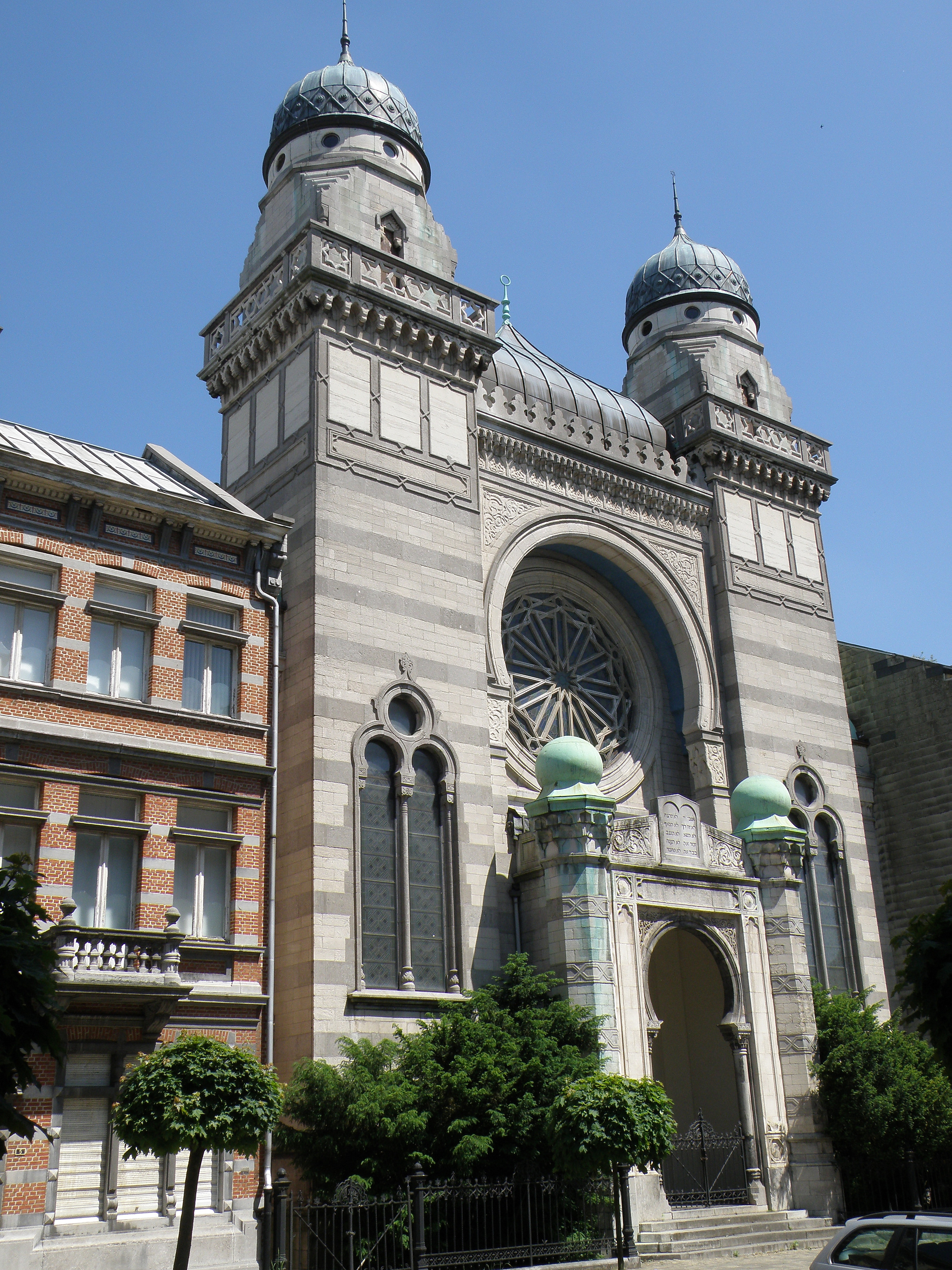
Hollandse Synagoge

After the Holocaust and the murder of its many Jews, Antwerp became a major centre for Orthodox Jews. At present, about 15,000 Haredi Jews, many of them Hasidic, live in Antwerp. The city has three official Jewish congregations: Shomrei Hadass, headed by Rabbi Pinchas Padwa; Machsike Hadass, headed by Rabbi Aron Schiff (formerly by Chief Rabbi Chaim Kreiswirth); and the Portuguese Community Ben Moshe. Antwerp has an extensive network of synagogues, shops, schools and organizations. Significant Hasidic movements in Antwerp include Pshevorsk, based in Antwerp, as well as branches of Satmar, Belz, Bobov, Ger, Skver, Klausenburg, Vizhnitz and several others. Rabbi Chaim Kreiswirth, chief rabbi of the Machsike Hadas community, who died in 2001, was arguably one of the better known personalities to have been based in Antwerp. An attempt to have a street named after him has received the support of the Town Hall and is in the process of being implemented.

==== Jain community ====
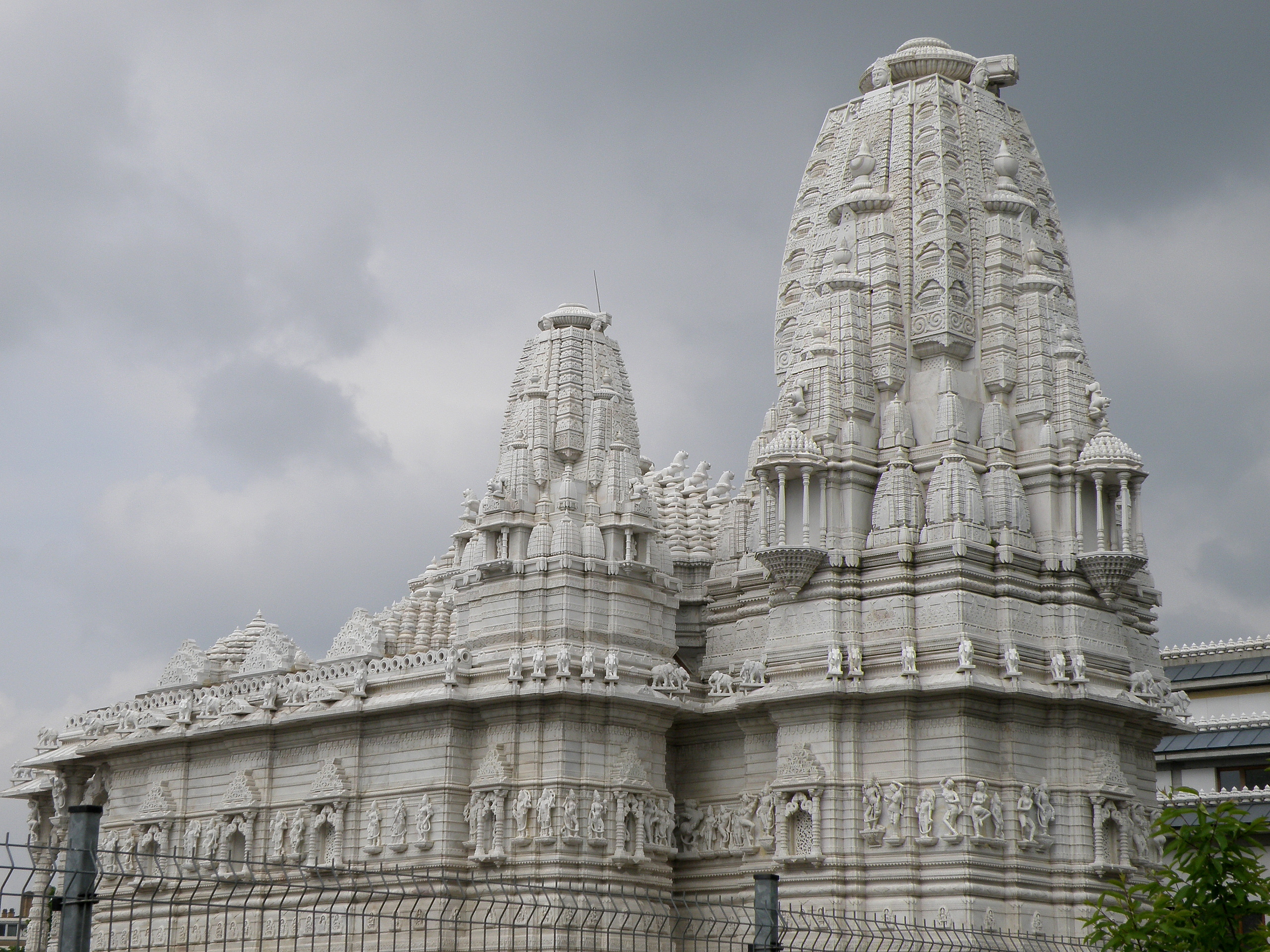
Jain temple in Wilrijk

The Jains in Belgium are estimated to be around about 1,500 people. The majority live in Antwerp, mostly involved in the very lucrative diamond business. Belgian Indian Jains control two-thirds of the rough diamonds trade and supplied India with roughly 36% of their rough diamonds. A major temple, with a cultural centre, has been built in Antwerp (Wilrijk). Ramesh Mehta, a Jain, is a member of the Belgian Council of Religious Leaders, put up on 17 December 2009.

==== Armenian community ====
Significant Armenian communities reside in Antwerp, many of whom are descendants of traders who settled during the 19th century. Most Armenian Belgians are adherents of the Armenian Apostolic Church, while a smaller number are adherents of the Armenian Catholic Church and Armenian Evangelical Church.

One of the important sectors that Armenian communities in Antwerp excel at and are involved in is the diamond trade business, that based primarily in the diamond district. Some of the famous Armenian families involved in the diamond business in the city are the Artinians, Arslanians, Aslanians, Barsamians and the Osganians.

== Economy ==
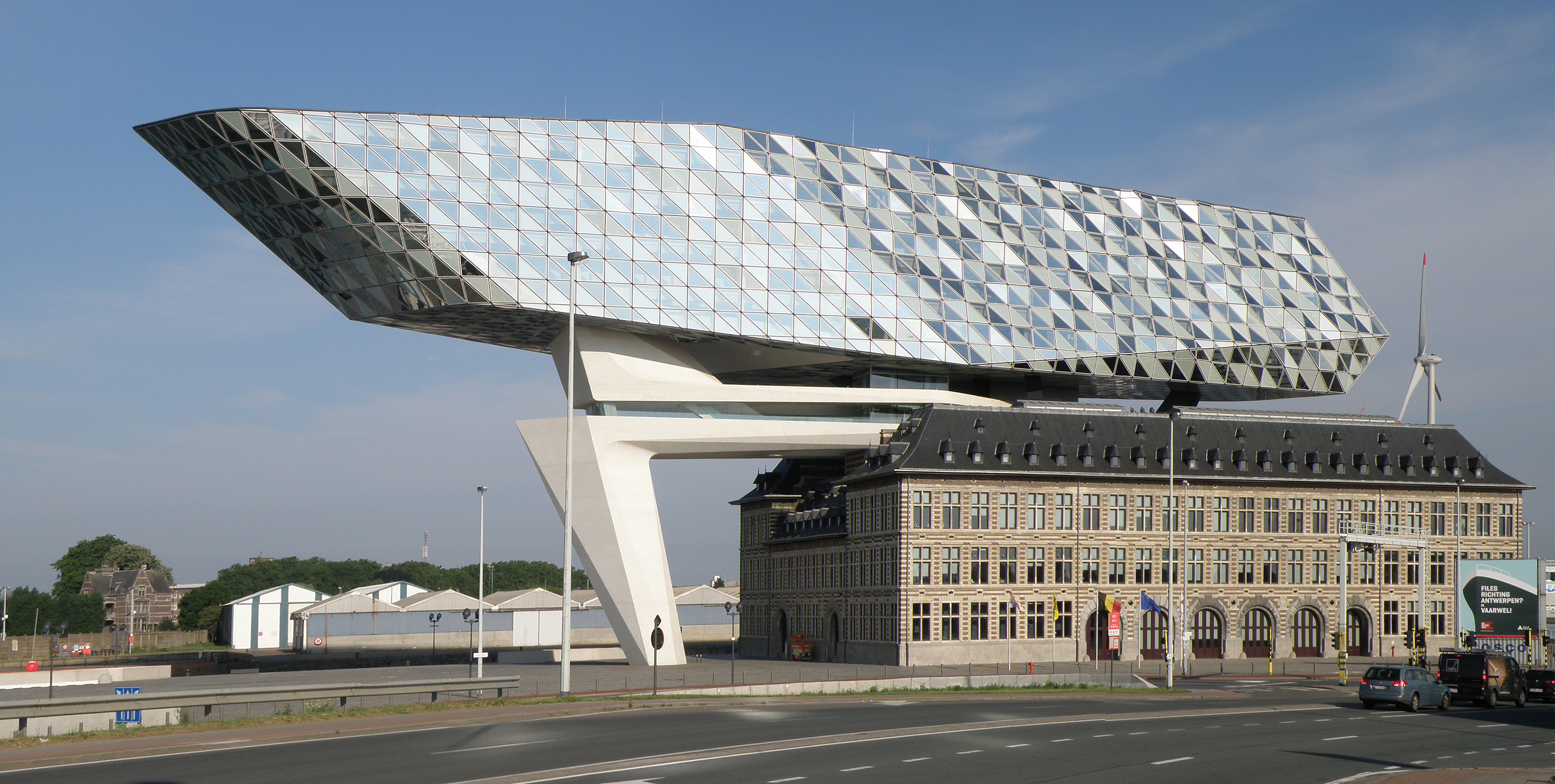
Port Authority Building

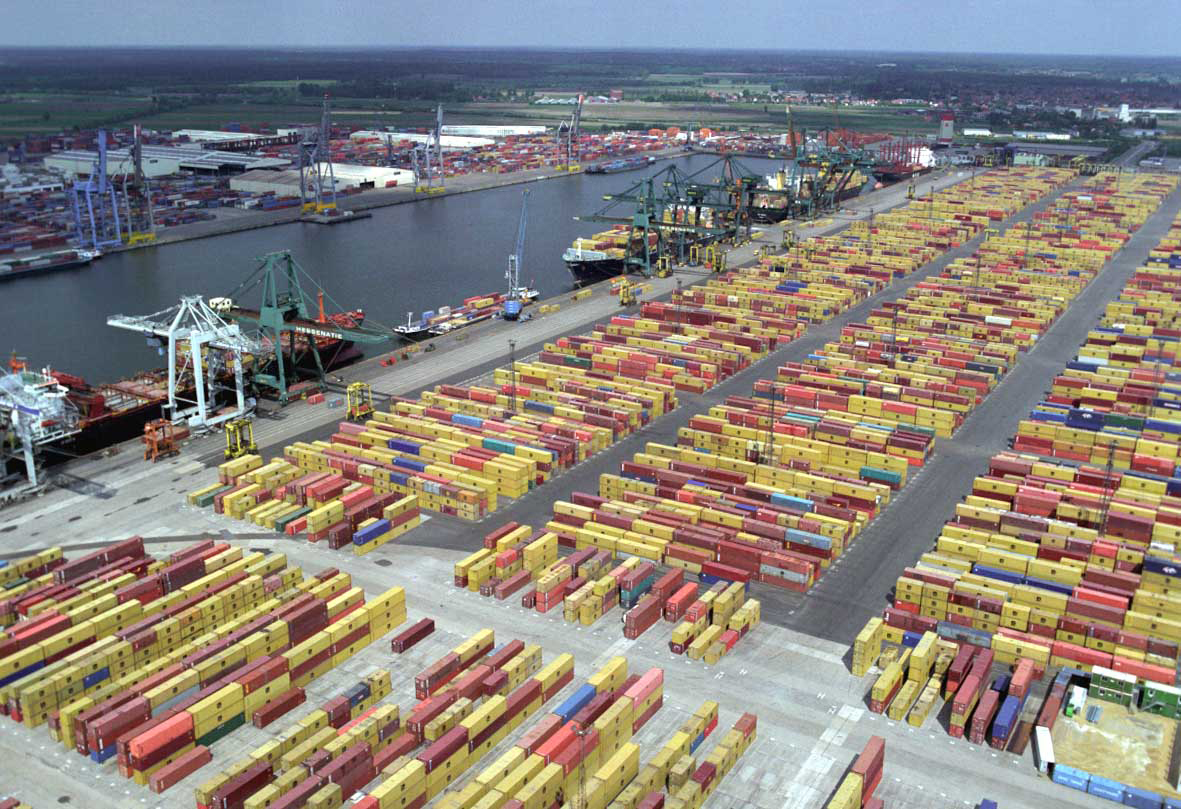
Bevrijdingsdok terminal at the Port of Antwerp

=== Port ===
According to the American Association of Port Authorities, the port of Antwerp was the seventeenth largest port in the world in 2005 (by tonnage), and second only to Rotterdam in Europe. It handled 235.2 million tons of cargo in 2018. Importantly it handles high volumes of economically attractive general and project cargo, as well as bulk cargo. Antwerp's docklands, with five oil refineries, are home to a massive concentration of petrochemical industries, second only to the petrochemical cluster in Houston, Texas. Electricity generation is also an important activity, with four nuclear power plants at Doel, a conventional power station in Kallo, as well as several smaller combined cycle plants. There is a wind farm in the northern part of the port area. There are plans to extend this in the period 2014–2020. The old Belgian bluestone quays bordering the Scheldt for a distance of 5.6 km (3.5 mi) to the north and south of the city centre have been retained for their sentimental value and are used mainly by cruise ships and short sea shipping.

=== Diamonds ===
Antwerp's other great mainstay is the diamond trade that takes place largely within the diamond district. 85 percent of the world's rough diamonds pass through the district annually, and in 2011 turnover in the industry was $56 billion. The city has four diamond bourses: the Diamond Club of Antwerp, the Beurs voor Diamanthandel, the Antwerpsche Diamantkring and the Vrije Diamanthandel.

Antwerp's history in the diamond trade dates back to as early as the sixteenth century, with the first diamond cutters guild being introduced in 1584. The industry never disappeared from Antwerp, and even experienced a second boom in the early twentieth century. By the year 1924, Antwerp had over 13,000 diamond finishers. Since World War II families of the large Hasidic Jewish community have dominated Antwerp's diamond trading industry, although the last two decades have seen Indian and Maronite Christians from Lebanon and Armenian, traders become increasingly important. The district was the site of the 2003 Antwerp diamond heist, the largest diamond theft of all time.

Antwerp World Diamond Centre, (AWDC) the successor to the Hoge Raad voor Diamant, plays an important role in setting standards, regulating professional ethics, training and promoting the interests of Antwerp as the capital of the diamond industry.

In recent years Antwerp has seen a downturn in the diamond business, with the industry shifting to cheaper labor markets such as Dubai or India. The industry has avoided the 2022 European sanctions against Russia although the imports from Alrosa have diminished. If banned, the AWDC claims 10,000 jobs would be at risk.

== Transportation ==
=== Rail ===
Antwerp is the focus of lines to the north to Essen and the Netherlands, east to Turnhout, south to Mechelen, Brussels and Charleroi, and southwest to Ghent and Ostend. It is served by international and Eurostar trains to Amsterdam, Rotterdam and Paris, and national trains to Ghent, Bruges, Ostend, Brussels, Charleroi, Hasselt, Liège, Leuven and Turnhout. Antwerp Central station is an architectural monument in itself, and is mentioned in W G Sebald's novel Austerlitz. Prior to the completion in 2007 of a tunnel that runs northwards under the city centre to emerge at the old Antwerp Dam station, Central was a terminus. Trains from Brussels to the Netherlands had to either reverse at Central or call only at Berchem station, 2 km (1 mi) to the south, and then describe a semicircle to the east, round the Singel. Now, they call at the new lower level of the station before continuing in the same direction.

Antwerp is also home to Antwerpen-Noord, the largest classification yard for freight in Belgium and the second largest in Europe. The majority of freight trains in Belgium depart from or arrive here. It has two classification humps and over a hundred tracks.

=== Local public transport ===
The city has a web of tram and bus lines operated by De Lijn and providing access to the city centre, suburbs and the Left Bank. The tram network has 14 lines, of which the underground section is called the "premetro" and includes a tunnel under the river. The Franklin Rooseveltplaats functions as the city's main hub for local and regional bus lines. However, there has been an evolution to end regional lines at transportation hubs more outward of the city centre, such as Zuid and Luchtbal.

=== Road ===
A six-lane motorway bypass encircles much of the city centre and runs through the urban residential area of Antwerp. Known locally as the "Ring" it offers motorway connections to Brussels, Hasselt and Liège, Ghent, Lille and Bruges and Breda and Bergen op Zoom (Netherlands). The banks of the Scheldt are linked by three road tunnels (in order of construction): the Waasland Tunnel (1934), the Kennedy Tunnel (1967) and the Liefkenshoek Tunnel (1991).

Daily congestion on the Ring led to a fourth high-volume highway link called the "Oosterweelconnection" being proposed. It would have entailed the construction of a long viaduct and bridge (the Lange Wapper) over the docks on the north side of the city in combination with the widening of the existing motorway into a 14-lane motorway; these plans were eventually rejected in a 2009 public referendum.

In September 2010 the Flemish Government decided to replace the bridge by a series of tunnels. There are ideas to cover the Ring in a similar way as happened around Paris, Hamburg, Madrid and other cities. This would reconnect the city with its suburbs and would provide development opportunities to accommodate part of the foreseen population growth in Antwerp which currently are not possible because of the pollution and noise generated by the traffic on the Ring. An old plan to build an R2 outer ring road outside the built-up urban area around the Antwerp agglomeration for port-related traffic and transit traffic never materialised.

In 2017 it was finally decided to complete the ringway of Antwerp with a new tunnel crossing the Scheldt. In a compromise with civil society, it has equally been decided that the ringway will in the long term completely be covered. This compromise is called the Toekomstverbond ("Agreement for the future"). Part of the same agreement is that highways further away from the city centre will be further developed and that the number of motorised trips in all transportation should be reduced to 50%.

Many FlixBuses have a stop at the central Franklin Rooseveltplaats.

=== Air ===
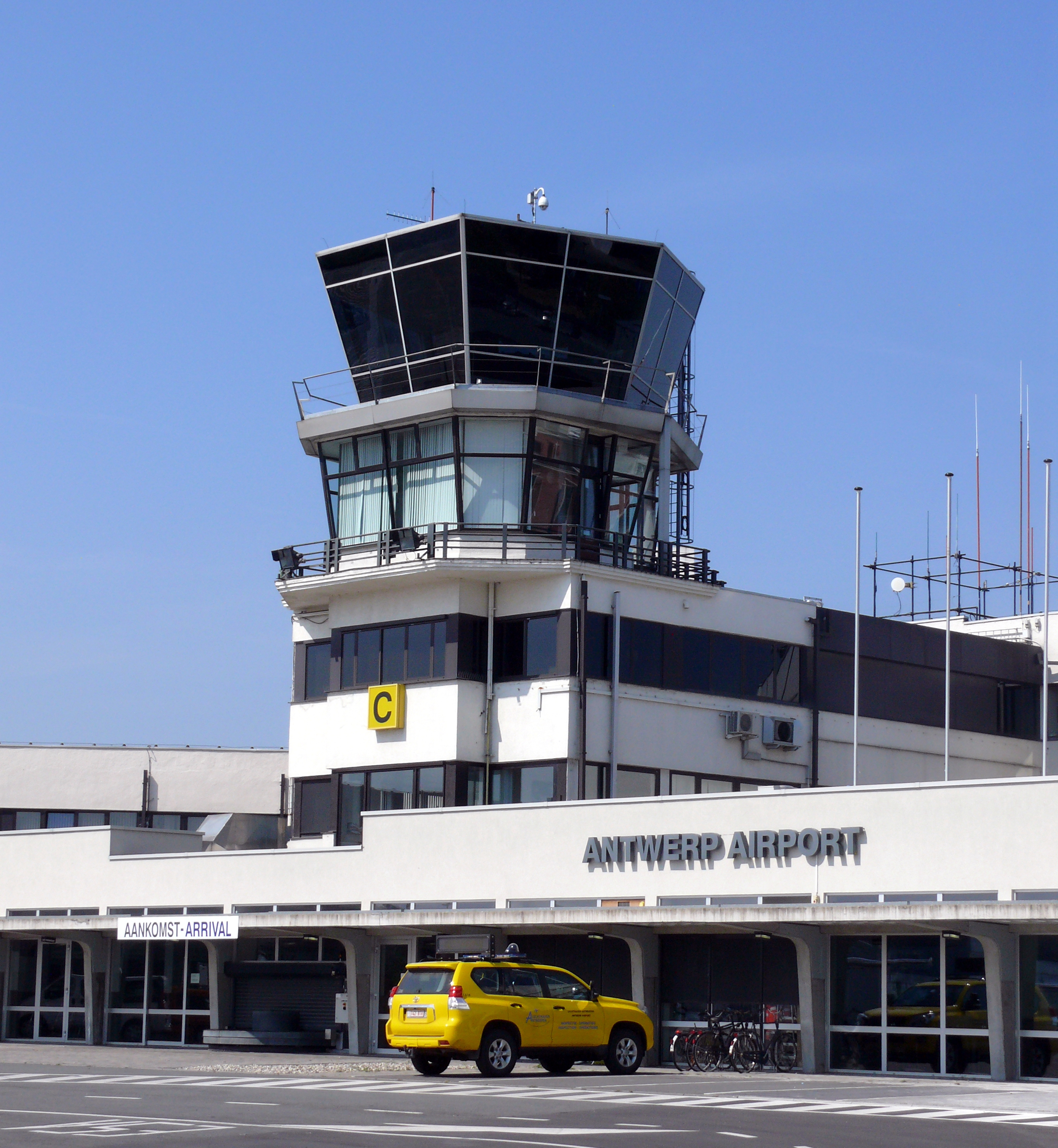
Antwerp International Airport

A small airport, Antwerp International Airport, is located in the district of Deurne. The airport is mainly used for business travel. Flying Group, the largest business jet service in Benelux and France, has its headquarters there and several maintenance sheds and hangars for their private jets. There are also some regularly scheduled flights by TUI fly with direct connectivity to Spain, Croatia, Italy, Austria and Morocco. Sky Alps operates a 2-3x weekly connection to Bolzano Airport. A bus service connects the airport to the city centre. The runway has increased in length, and there is now direct connectivity to Spain, Germany, France, Italy, and Greece from the city of Antwerp.

Belgium's major international airport, Brussels Airport, is about 45 km (28 mi) from the city of Antwerp, and connects the city worldwide. It is connected to the city centre by bus, and also by train. The new Diabolo rail connection provides a direct fast train connection between Antwerp and Brussels Airport as of the summer of 2012.

There is also a direct rail service between Antwerp (calling at Central and Berchem stations) and Charleroi South station, with a connecting buslink to Brussels South Charleroi Airport, which runs twice per hour on working days.

=== Water ===
Since 2017 there has been a regular water ferry halting at the city centre, connecting it with towns up and down the river Scheldt from Kruibeke to Lillo. This service is called DeWaterbus. It is popular with both commuting port laborers and cyclist making a day trip.

== Politics ==
=== City council ===
The current city council was elected in the 2024 local elections, with its governing coalition consisting of the parties New Flemish Alliance and Vooruit, led by acting mayor Els van Doesburg (N-VA).

Party	Seats
New Flemish Alliance	23
Workers' Party of Belgium	12
Vooruit	7
Groen	6
Flemish Interest	6
Christian Democratic and Flemish	1
Total	55

=== Former mayors ===
In the 16th and 17th century important mayors include Philips of Marnix, Lord of Saint-Aldegonde, Anthony van Stralen, Lord of Merksem and Nicolaas II Rockox. In the early years after Belgian independence, Antwerp was governed by Catholic-Unionist mayors. Between 1848 and 1921, all mayors were from the Liberal Party (except for the so-called Meeting-intermezzo between 1863 and 1872). Between 1921 and 1932, the city had a Catholic mayor again: Frans Van Cauwelaert. From 1932 onwards and up until 2013, all mayors belonged to the Social Democrat party: Camille Huysmans, Lode Craeybeckx, Frans Detiège and Mathilde Schroyens, and after the municipality fusion: Bob Cools, Leona Detiège and Patrick Janssens. Since February 2025, the acting mayor is the Flemish nationalist Els van Doesburg, belonging to the Flemish separatist party New Flemish Alliance.

== Culture ==
Antwerp had an artistic reputation in the 17th century, based on its school of painting, which included Rubens, Van Dyck, Jordaens, the Teniers and many others.

=== Museums ===
- Royal Museum of Fine Arts. The neoclassical building housing a collection of paintings, sculptures and drawings from the 14th to the 20th centuries. It is one of the primary landmarks of the Zuid district of Antwerp. The majestic building was designed by Jean-Jacques Winders and Frans Van Dijk, built beginning in 1884, opened in 1890, and completed in 1894.
- Rubenshuis, is the former home and studio of Peter Paul Rubens in Antwerp. It is now a museum.
- Plantin-Moretus Museum, preserves the house of the printer Christoffel Plantijn and his successor Jan Moretus. It has been a UNESCO World Heritage Site since 2005.
- Museum Mayer van den Bergh, with works from the Gothic and Renaissance period in the Netherlands and Belgium, including paintings by Pieter Brueghel the Elder.
- Snijders&Rockox House is located in two neighbouring townhouses and showcases a collection of 16th and 17th century Flemish art.
- Museum of Contemporary Art (M HKA), the museum holds a permanent collection of contemporary art from Belgian and international artists, an arthouse cinema and an extensive library of books on contemporary art.
- Museum aan de Stroom, whose central focus is Antwerp and its connection to the world.
- Fotomuseum Antwerp, also known as FOMU, is a museum of photography
- MoMu ModeMuseum is a fashion museum. Founded on 21 September 2002, the museum collects, conserves, studies and exhibits Belgian fashion.
- Red Star Line Museum, is a museum about the history of the Red Star Line, which opened on 28 September 2013.
- DIVA is a museum about diamonds, jewellery and silver.
- Atlantic Wall & Air War Bunker Museum is a military war museum which preserves fortifications of the Atlantic Wall.
- Flemish Tram and Bus Museum is a museum of public transport.
- The Maidens' House is an art museum and historical museum located in a 17th-century historic building.
- The Butcher's Hall is a museum focusing on sound, music and dance.
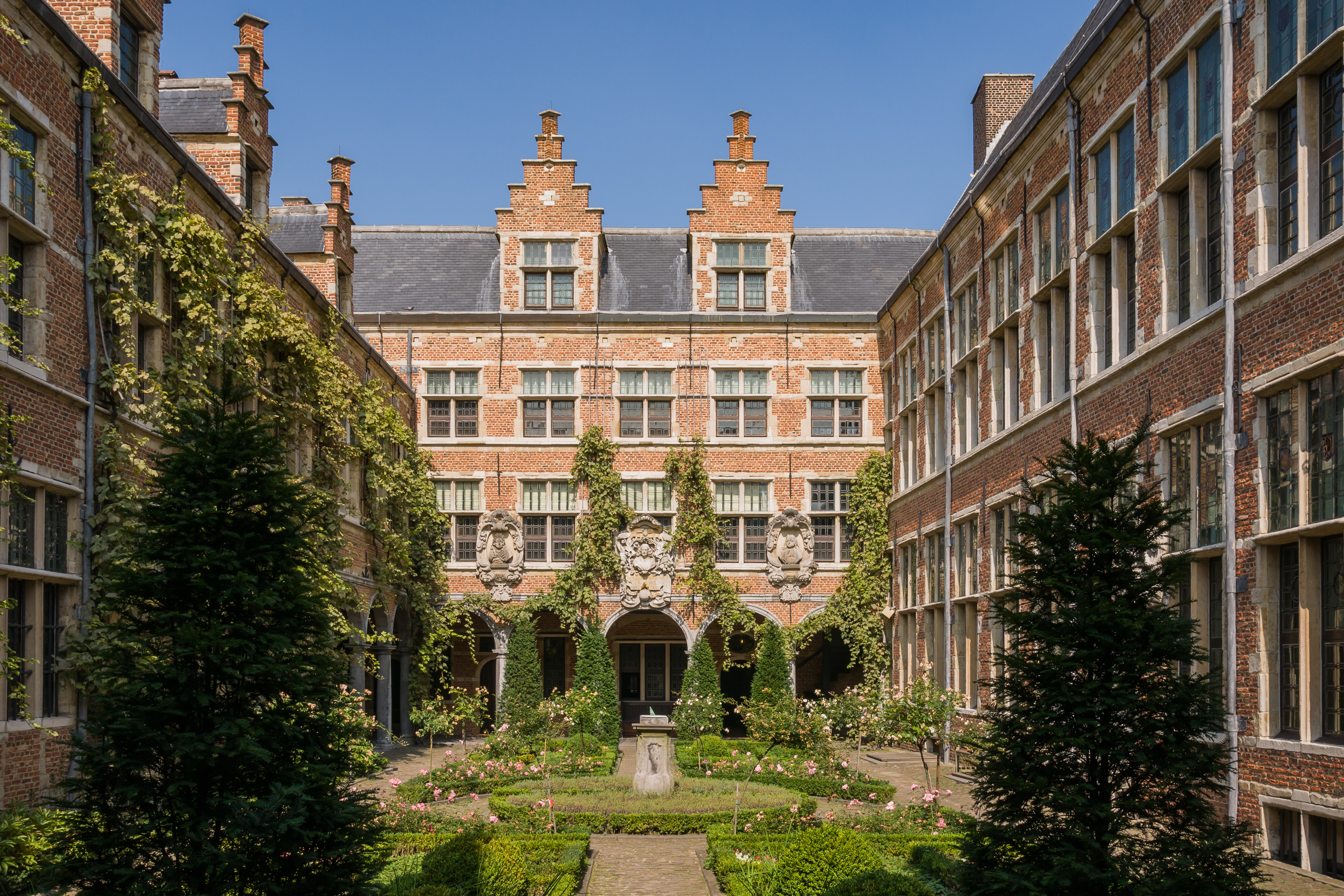
Plantin-Moretus Museum

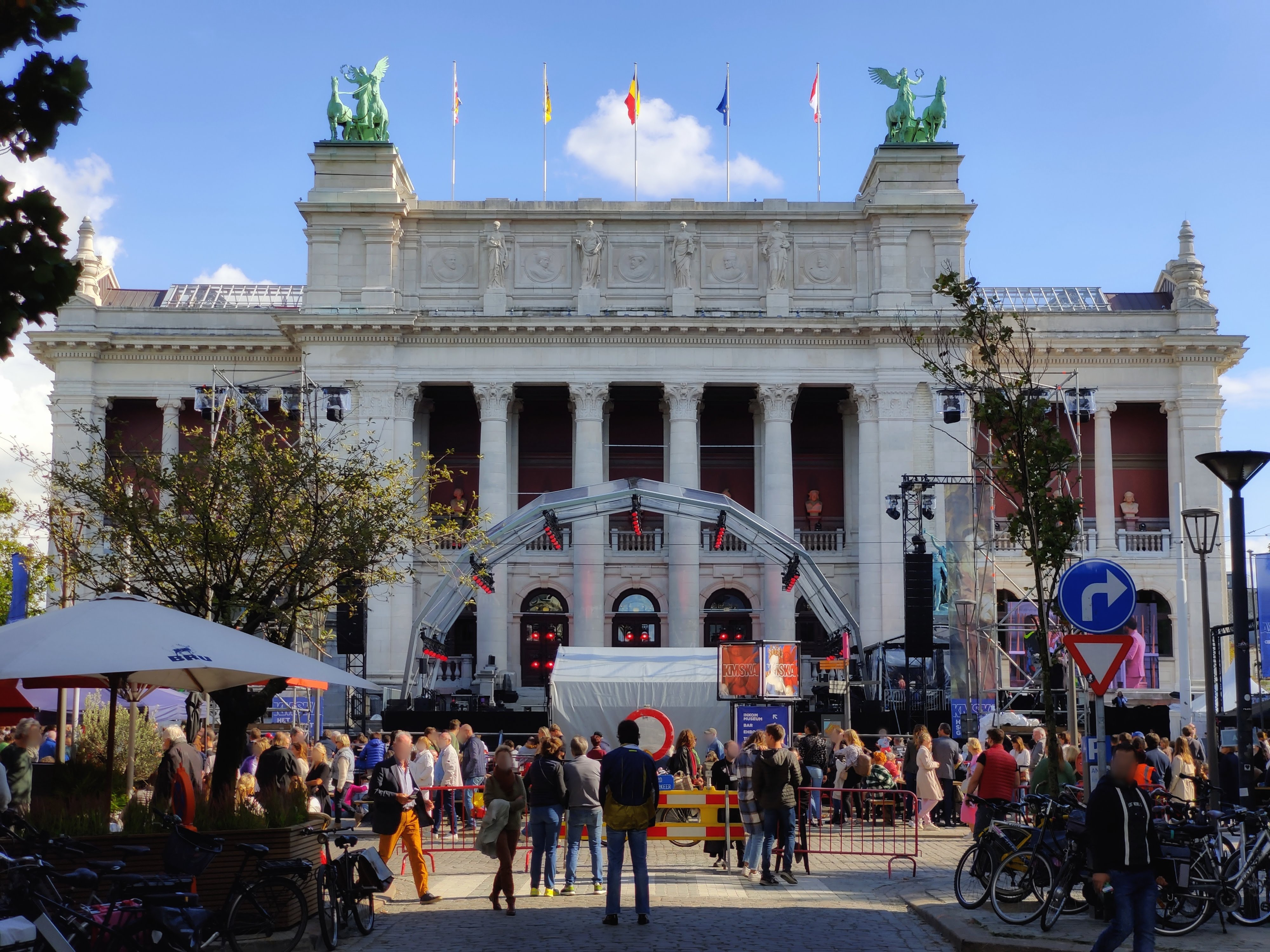
Royal Museum of Fine Arts (KMSKA)

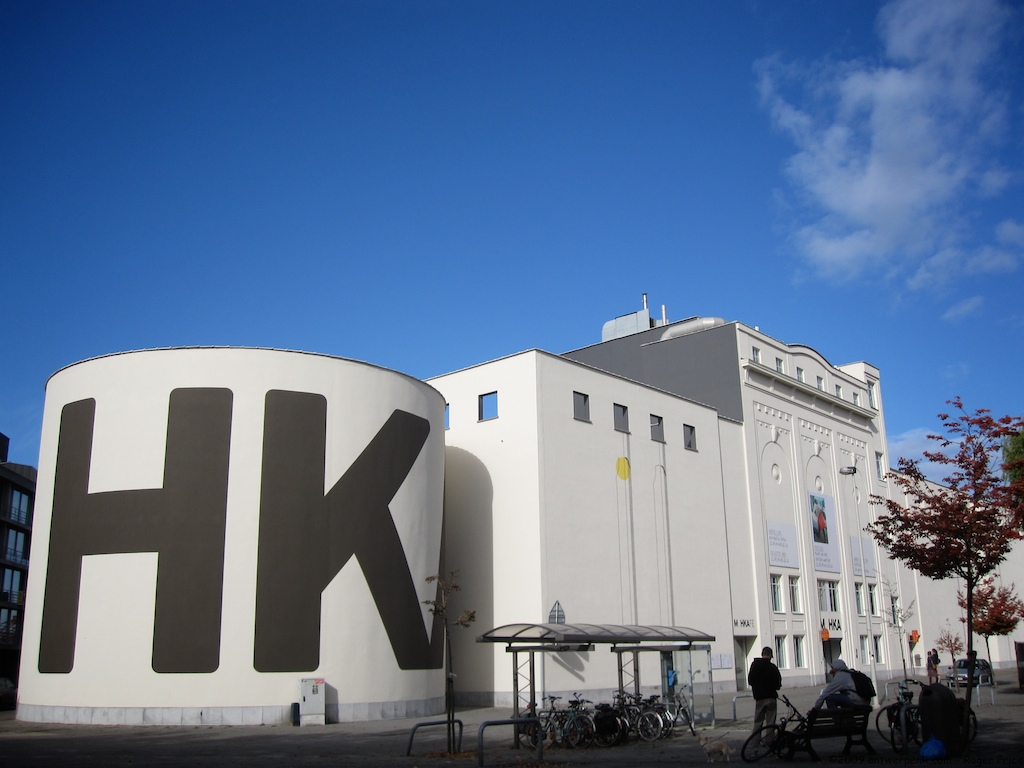
Museum of Contemporary Art (M HKA)

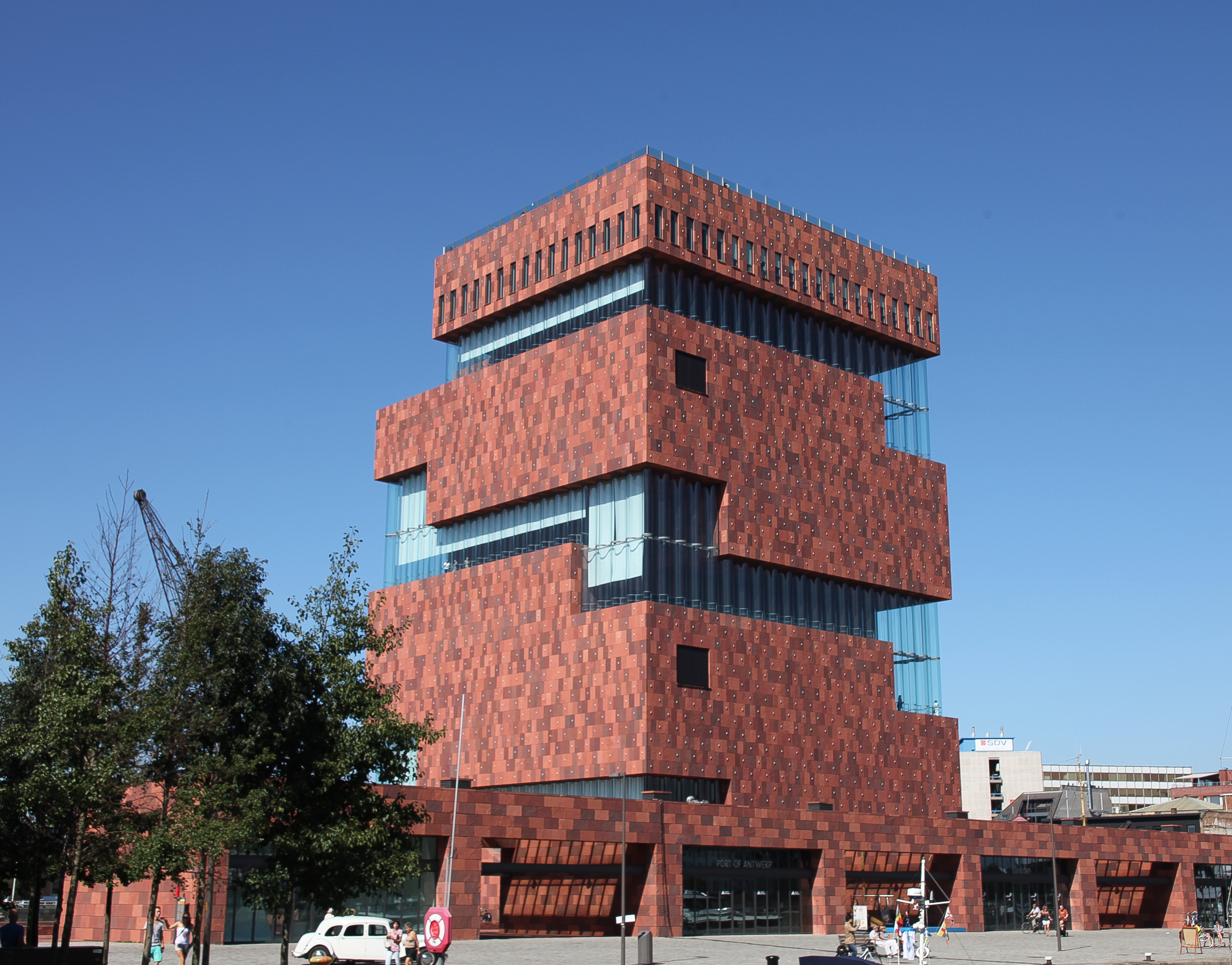
Museum aan de Stroom

=== Music and festivals ===
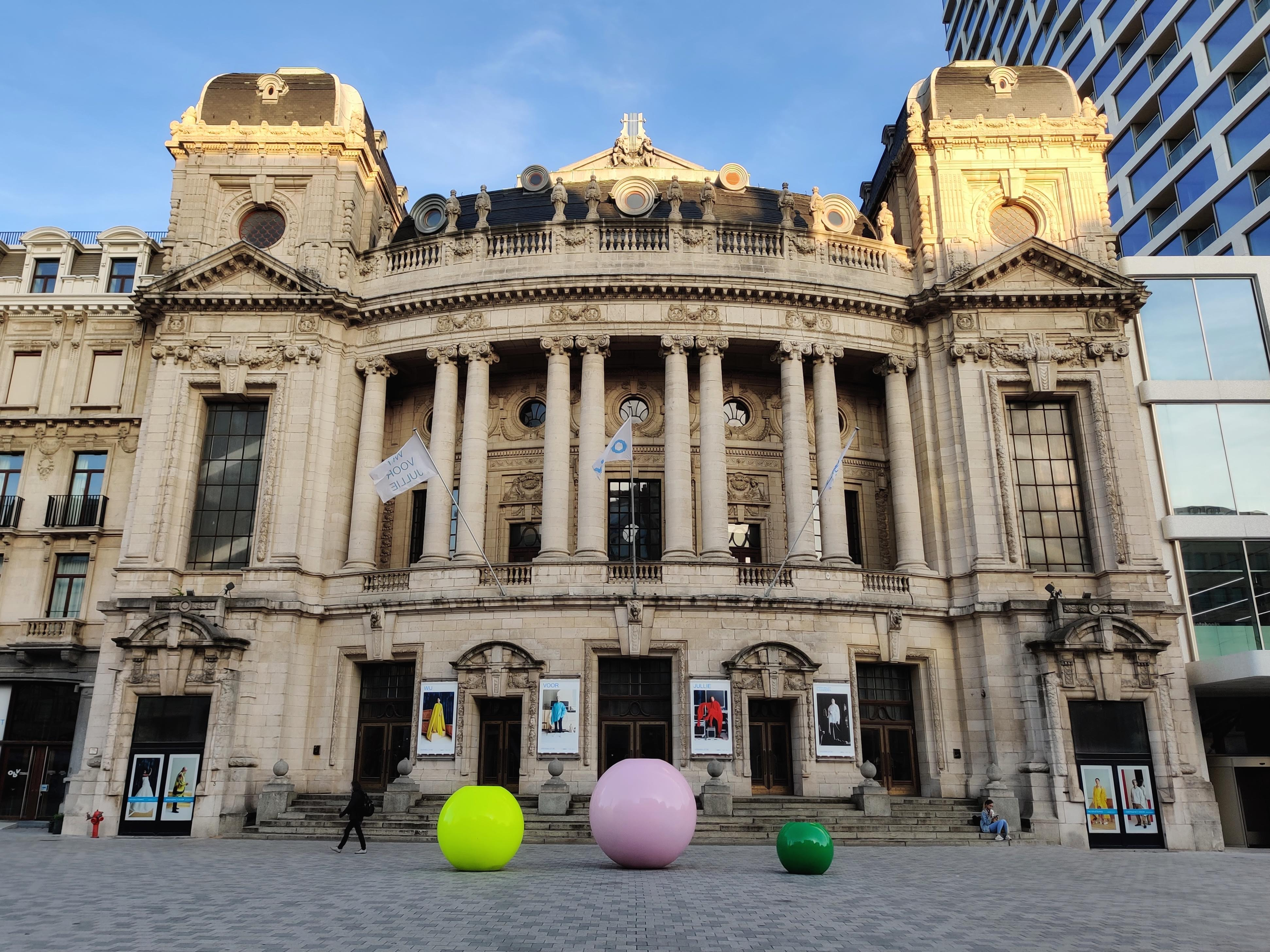
Vlaamse Opera

Antwerp is the home of the Antwerp Jazz Club (AJC), founded in 1938 and located on the square Grote Markt since 1994. Antwerp also has various concert halls, such as the Stadsschouwburg, the Bourlaschouwburg, the Flemish Opera, the Arenbergschouwburg and the Koningin Elisabethzaal; the latter being the home of the Antwerp Symphony Orchestra. Large (pop) performances are often held in the Sportpaleis or in the Lotto Arena. These event halls are located in Merksem. In addition, there are other well-known venues like De Roma and Trix, both of which are located in Borgerhout.

A band originating in Antwerp achieving major international success is Deus.

Some well known festivals around the city are: Linkerwoofer, a pop-rock music festival located at the left bank of the Scheldt. This music festival starts in August and mostly local Belgian musicians play and perform in this event. Jazz Middelheim is an annual summer jazz festival in the Middelheim Park. Tomorrowland is probably the most famous festival to arise from Antwerp. Though the festival is effectively located 15 km (10 mi) south of the city in Boom, its founders in the past organised a festival ('Antwerp is burning') within city limits. The office of the company behind Tomorrowland (weareone.world bvba) is located in the heart of the city. The company founders are involved in conceptualising urban planning concepts for specific Antwerp areas and are known to invite their favourite Antwerp food places to set up a pop-up at the festival. Sfinks festival is a global pop festival that takes place annually in Boechout, a village southeast of Antwerp. The first edition dates from 1976. Other popular festivals are Fire Is Gold, Ampere Open Air and Vaag Outdoor focusing more on hip-hop music, house and techno.

=== Nightlife ===
Antwerp has many cafés and nightclubs situated throughout its various neighbourhoods. The old centre and Grote Markt have many historic buildings and cafes. Belgians are known for their beer, and a wide range of local brews are available.

Other popular areas include het Mechelseplein, home to various cafés as well as the bustling Dageraadplaats in the belle-époque neighbourhood of Zurenborg.

The neighbourhood of het Zuid is also a popular nightlife destination, with many bars, restaurants, and cafés. This district is named after its nearby museums, including the Royal Museum of Fine Arts, the Museum of Contemporary Art Antwerp (M HKA), and the Photo Museum.

Het groen kwartier (the green quarter) is also a hub of cultural and artistic activity. Het Eilandje is a neighbourhood in Antwerp, with many cafés and restaurants situated around the MAS Museum.

Antwerp is known for a diverse range of nightclubs that cater to different tastes. Among these clubs are some of the most famous and notorious in Belgium. Cinderella's Ballroom was famous in the 1980s.

=== Fashion ===
Antwerp is a rising fashion city, and has produced designers such as the Antwerp Six. The city has a cult status in the fashion world, due to the Royal Academy of Fine Arts, one of the most important fashion academies in the world. It has served as the learning centre for many Belgian fashion designers. Since the 1980s, several graduates of the Belgian Royal Academy of Fine Arts have become internationally successful fashion designers in Antwerp. The city has had a huge influence on other Belgian fashion designers such as Raf Simons, Veronique Branquinho, Olivier Theyskens and Kris Van Assche. In 2019, Arte won the Fashion brand of the Year award at the Belgian Fashion Awards. The Antwerp label was founded by Bertony Da Silva in 2009.

=== Local products ===
Antwerp is famous for its local products. In August every year the Bollekesfeest takes place. The Bollekesfeest is a showcase for such local products as Bolleke, an amber beer from the De Koninck Brewery. The city's historical ale, Seefbier, dating back to the 16th century and brewed at the Antwerpse Brouw Compagnie is a testament to the city's long brewing history and one of Belgium's oldest existing beerstyles. The Mokatine sweets made by Confiserie Roodthooft, Elixir D'Anvers, a locally made liquor, locally roasted coffee from Koffie Verheyen, sugar from Candico, Poolster pickled herring and Equinox horse meat, are other examples of local specialities. One of the most known products of the city are its biscuits, the Antwerpse Handjes, literally "Antwerp Hands". Usually made from a short pastry with almonds or milk chocolate, they symbolise the Antwerp trademark and folklore. The local products are represented by a non-profit organization, Streekproducten Provincie Antwerpen vzw.

=== Restaurants and cuisine ===
Antwerp has grown into the culinary capital of Flanders and Belgium. It has eleven restaurants with at least one MICHELIN star. Zilte by Viki Geunes located in the MAS museum even received the ultimate award of three stars.

=== World Choir Games ===
The city of Antwerp was co-host for the 2021 World Choir Games together with the city of Ghent. Organised by the Interkultur Foundation, the World Choir Games is the biggest choral competition and festival in the world.

=== Missions to Seafarers ===
A number of Christian missions to seafarers are based in Antwerp. These include the Mission to Seafarers, British & International Sailors' Society, the Finnish Seamen's Mission, the Norwegian Sjømannskirken and the Apostleship of the Sea. They provide cultural and social activities as well as religious services. The iconic Italiëlei premises have been closed down and all activities have been moved to the Antwerp Harbour Hotel on Noorderlaan.

== Sport ==
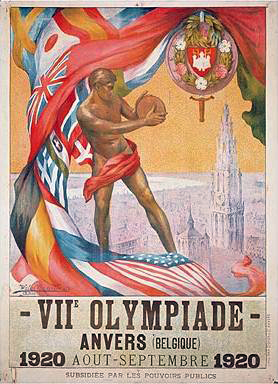
Official poster of the 1920 Summer Olympics in Antwerp

=== Events ===
Antwerp held the 1920 Summer Olympics, which were the first games after the First World War and also the only ones to be held in Belgium. Antwerp hosted the World Artistic Gymnastics Championships in 2013 and 2023 in the Sportpaleis. Annually Antwerp hosts the European Open ATP Tour 250 tennis tournament that takes place in Antwerp's Sport Palace. It was introduced for the 2016 ATP World Tour. Another annual event is the Antwerp 10 miles and the Antwerp marathon.

For the year 2013, Antwerp was awarded the title of European Capital of Sport.

=== Football ===
Antwerp is home of two professional football clubs being, Royal Antwerp F.C., currently playing in the Belgian First Division, founded in 1880 and is known as 'The Great Old' for being the first club registered to the Royal Belgian Football Association in 1895. Over the course of the club's history, Royal Antwerp have won five Belgian league titles as well as four Belgian Cups. Antwerp F.C. is also a member of the Club of Pioneers. Another club in the city is K Beerschot VA, founded in 1899 by former Royal Antwerp players. They play at the Olympisch Stadion, the main venue of the 1920 Olympics. Between these two football teams there has always been a big rivalry. When the two play against each other the stadiums are packed and the passioned fans give a great display of their passion, but this has also led to fights, hooliganism and vandalism.

=== Basketball ===
The Antwerp Giants play in the BNXT league, the league is the first tier in both the Dutch and Belgian system. Their home ground is the Lotto Arena. Antwerp has won the Belgian championship once, in 2000. The team has also won five Belgian Cups, in 2000, 2007, 2019, 2020 and 2023.

The city's Groenplaats hosted the official 2022 FIBA 3x3 World Cup.

== Education ==
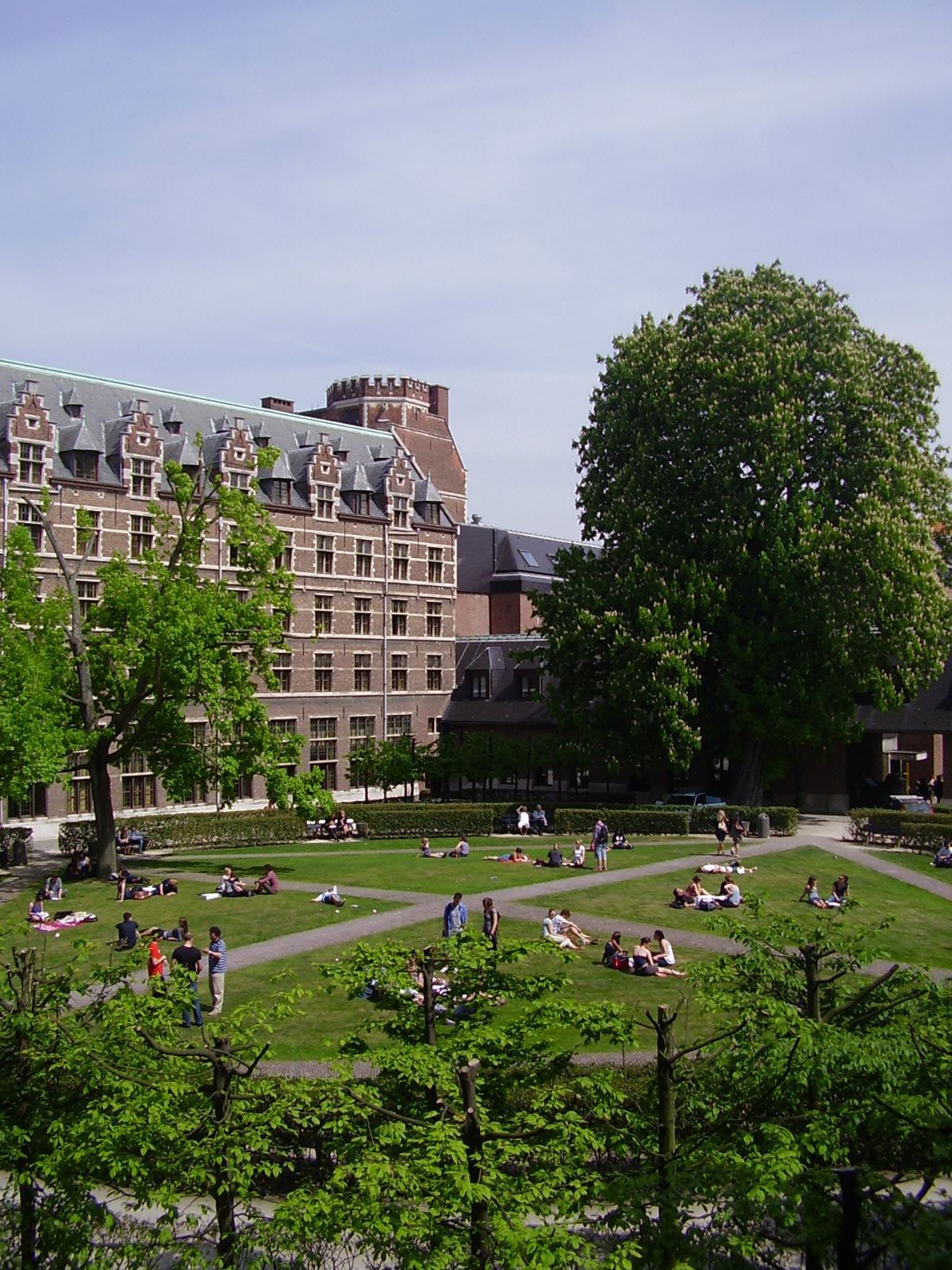
University of Antwerp

Antwerp has a university and several colleges. The University of Antwerp (Universiteit Antwerpen) was established in 2003, following the merger of the RUCA, UFSIA and UIA institutes. Their roots go back to 1852. The university has approximately 23,000 registered students, making it the third-largest university in Flanders, as well as 1,800 foreign students. It has 7 faculties, spread over four campus locations in the city centre and in the south of the city. The university is part of Young Universities for the Future of Europe (YUFE) and Young European Research Universities Network (YERUN).

The KU Leuven has a presence in Antwerp too.

The city has several colleges, including Antwerp Management School (AMS), the Antwerp Maritime Academy, the Karel de Grote University of Applied Sciences and Arts and AP Hogeschool Antwerpen. AP Hogeschool has about 15,000 students and 1,600 staff, and the Karel de Grote Hogeschool has about 13,500 students and 1,300 staff.

== International relations ==
=== Twin towns and sister cities ===
The following places are twinned with or are sister cities to Antwerp:

- Barcelona, Spain, 1997
- Cape Town, South Africa, 1996
- Fez, Morocco, 2000
- Haifa, Israel, 1995
- Ludwigshafen, Germany, 1998
- Marseille, France, 1958
- Mulhouse, France, 1954
- Rostock, Germany, 1963
- Rotterdam, Netherlands, 1940
- Shanghai, China, 1984

=== Sister ports ===
- Port of Nagoya, Japan, 1988

=== Partnerships ===
Within the context of development cooperation, Antwerp is also linked to

- Paramaribo, Suriname
- Durban, South Africa

== See also ==
- Port of Antwerp
- Antwerp Book Fair
- Antwerp Diamond Trade Fair
- Antwerp Water Works (AWW)
- Fortifications of Antwerp
- List of mayors of Antwerp
- List of urban areas in the European Union
