= Art Nouveau in Antwerp =

Local implementation of a style of architecture and design

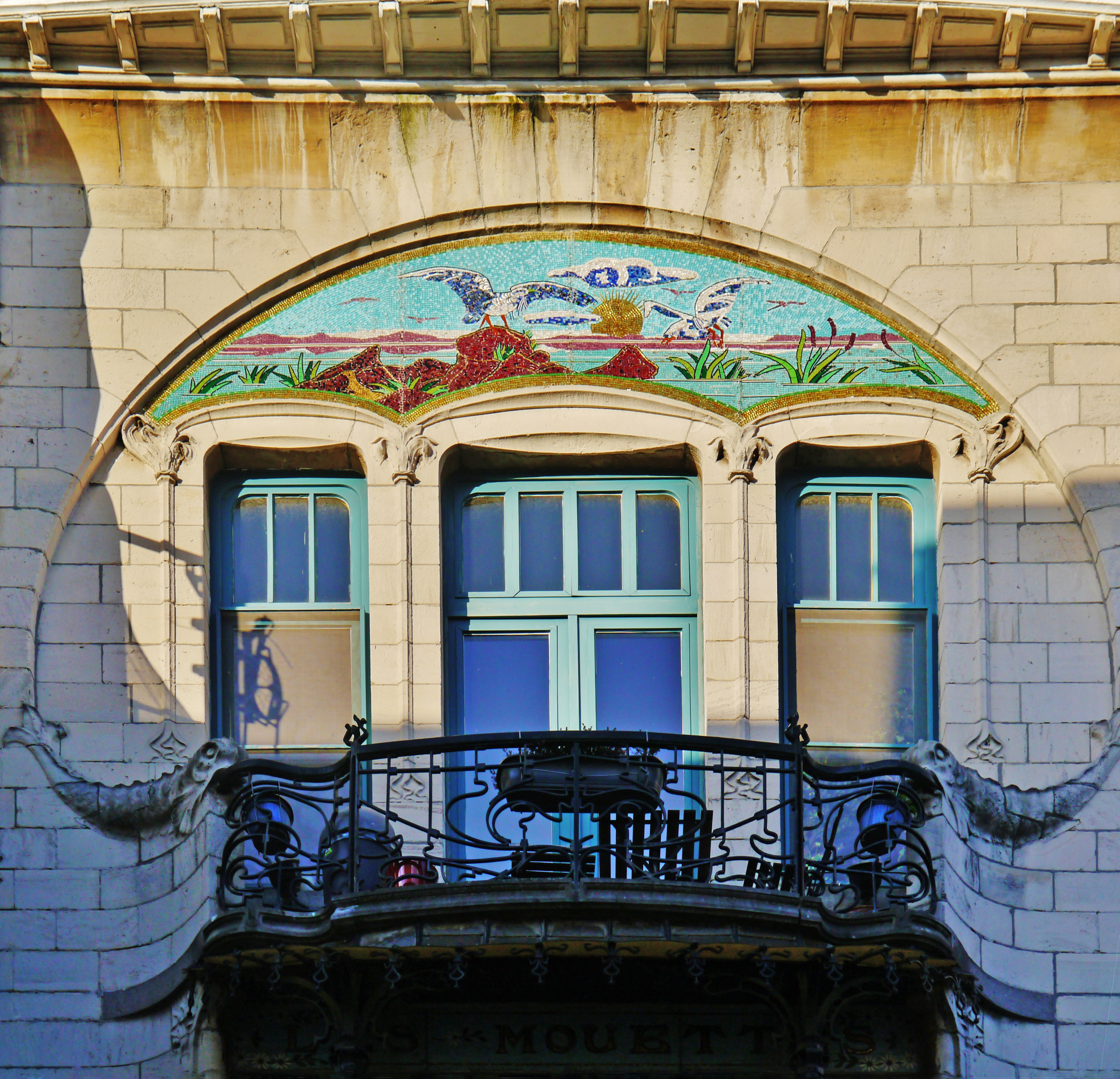
"Les Mouettes" (Seagulls House), 39 Waterloostraat, Antwerp, built in 1905.

The Art Nouveau movement of architecture and design appeared in Antwerp, Belgium, between roughly 1898 and the start of the First World War in 1914. It was principally practiced by the architects Joseph Bascourt, Jacques De Weerdt, Jules Hofman, Émile Van Averbeke, Émile Thielens, Frans Smet-Verhas as well as August Cols and Alfried Defever. Its principal characteristics in Antwerp buildings include whiplash lines and irregular curves in moldings, ironwork, and incised decoration; gentle arches; colorful ceramic tiles, mosaics, and stained glass; gilded asymmetrical ornament; sgraffito; and keyhole windows and screens.

== The Zurenborg district ==
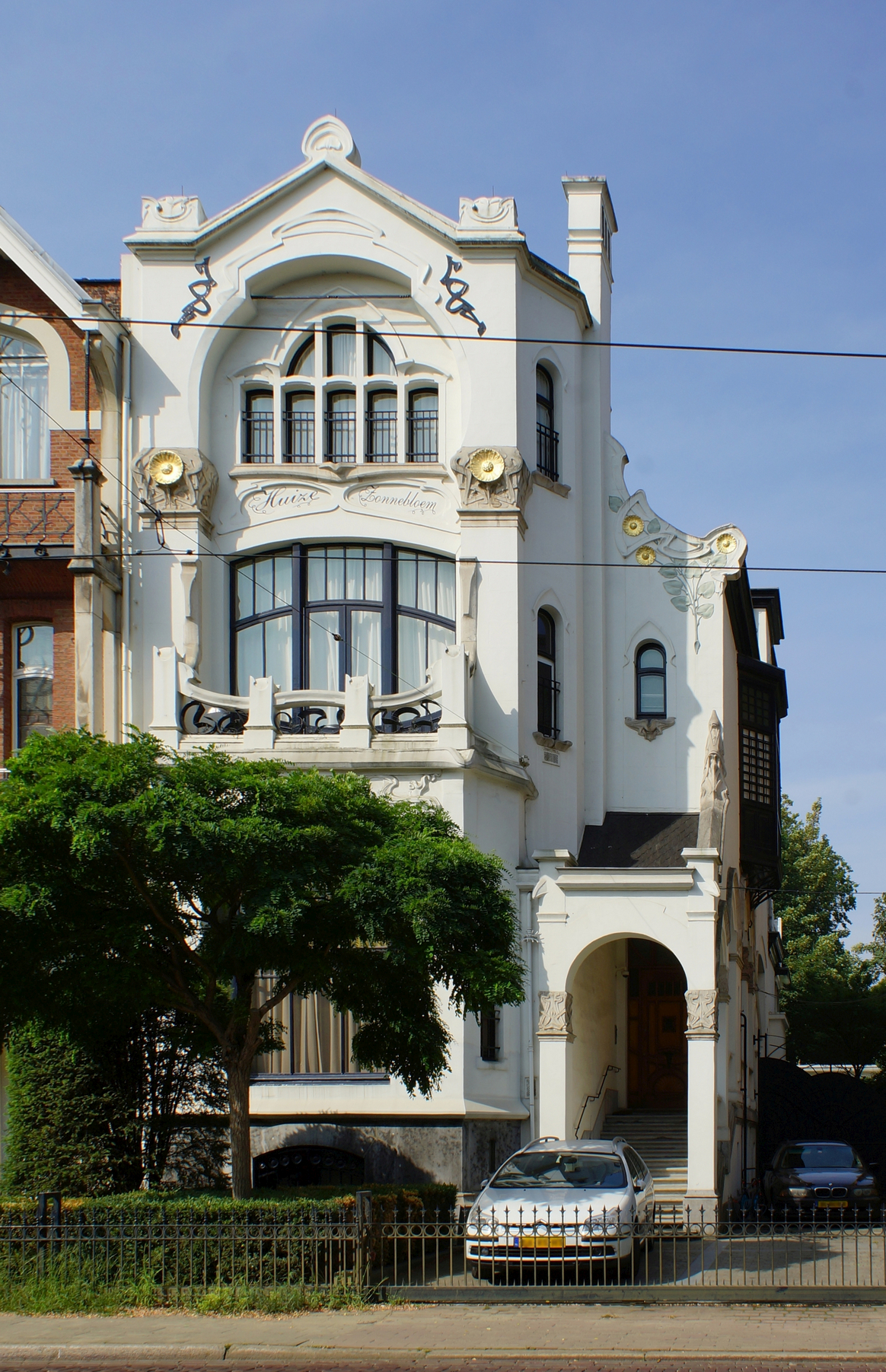
Zonnebloem (Sunflower) House) on the Cogels Osylei, Antwerp, designed by Jules Hofman and built in 1900.

Unlike the other major Belgian metropolitan areas such as Brussels or Liège, where Art Nouveau flourished in numerous different parts of the city, Antwerp's Art Nouveau buildings are largely concentrated within a single quarter, Zurenborg, which is a suburban part of the city located about three kilometers from the city center, immediately north of the Berchem train station. The greater part of the structures are situated in the so-called "Golden Triangle" of Antwerpian Art Nouveau, along the streets called the Transvaalstraat, Waterloostraat and Cogels Osylei. The latter, an arterial boulevard, contains a rich cornucopia of highly-ornamented, monumental Victorian- and Edwardian-era architecture, wherein various styles--neoclassical, eclectic, various Renaissance idioms, and above all Art Nouveau--intermingle harmoniously behind small gardens or gates with successive diversity.

== Principal Art Nouveau buildings in Antwerp ==
A few major buildings stand out among the Art Nouveau structures in Antwerp, though none have reached the kind of iconic status such as that enjoyed by Henry van de Velde's Bloemenwerf or Victor Horta's Hôtel Tassel, Maison du Peuple, Hôtel Solvay, or Maison Van Eetvelde, all in Brussels.

=== Zonnebloem (Sunflower) House ===
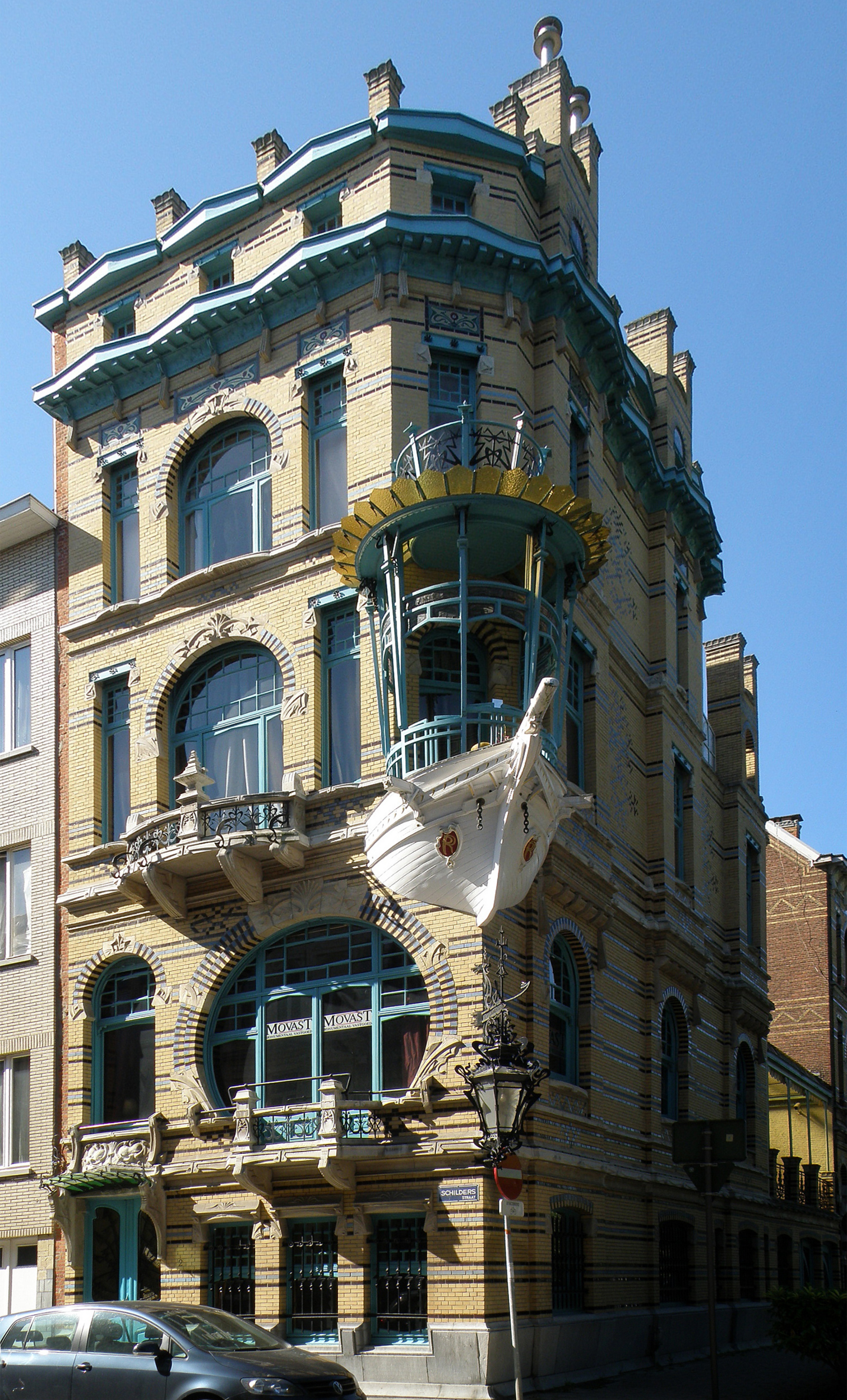
House of the Five Continents, one of the most original Art Nouveau buildings in Antwerp, built in 1901 to designs of Frans Smet-Verhas.

One of the most beautiful examples of Antwerp's Art Nouveau structures is the Zonnebloem House, sometimes called the Maison le Tournesol (Sunflower House), built in 1900 to designs of Jules Hofman at 50, Cogels Osylei in a strand of Art Nouveau close to the German Jugendstil. The stylized floral ornaments run along the bays that differ at each level. One can see two sunflowers on the main façade and three smaller ones on the first floor above ground just above the entrance arcade.

=== House of the Battle of Waterloo ===
Another remarkable construction in this district is the Huis de Slag van Waterloo (House of the Battle of Waterloo), designed by the architect Frans Smet-Verhas and built in 1905. Here the nearly-symmetrical façade (broken only by a side tower) is articulated by mosaics bearing the names, figures, and standards of the Duke of Wellington and Napoleon I, along with a strange arrangement of bricks on the uppermost floor.

=== The Maison du Peuple ("House of the People") ===
Several very interesting and original buildings were constructed in other parts of Antwerp, including the Maison du Peuple built in 1901 by the architects Emile van Averbeke and Jan van Asperen, similar in purpose and corporate structure to other Maisons du Peuple (centers of cooperative workers' assistance, usually tied to socialist parties) in Europe. The balanced façade is pierced in the center by a great oval bay is surrounded by a mosaic symbolizing labor with the slogan "Help U Zelve" (literally, "Help Yourself"). The façade is crowned by two angled pylons that terminate in sculptures in stone of a man and a woman, with each figure encircled by a spiral of wrought iron.

=== The House of the Five Continents ===
Also notable is the House of the Five Continents ("Huis de Vijf Werelddelen"), probably the most original Art Nouveau structure in the city, nicknamed "'t Bootje" ("The Little Boat"), due to the second-floor loggia in the form of a ship's prow that emerges at the corner of the structure. It is actually a complex of four houses designed for the well-heeled shipbuilder P. Roeis, hence the ship forms and name, which also references Antwerp's longstanding stature as a global port. It is situated at the angle of Schilderstraat and Plaatsnijdersstraat and was built to designs of Frans Smet-Vehas in 1901.

== List of Art Nouveau structures in Antwerp ==
This list includes all buildings that might be classified as Art Nouveau in a broad sense. Note that this list is not exhaustive and should be added to as need be.

=== Zurenborg District ===
==== Northern Zurenborg ====
Address	Name	Architect(s)	Date	Image
24 Cobdenstraat	Emile van Averbeke House	Emile van Averbeke	1907	
55/57/59 Dolfijnstraat	unnamed	Joseph Baeckelmans	1905	
38/40/46/48 Grotehondstraat	Ensemble Notus, Zephyr, Eurus and Boreas (The Four Winds) (38 and 40 only pictured)	August Cols and Alfried Defever	1901	
135 Lange Van Ruusbroecstraat	Schroyens House	Frans Smet-Verhas	1908	
102/104/106 Mercatorstraat	Ensemble Verfaillie	Emile van Averbeke and W. Diehl	1901	
28 Oostenstraat	House "'t Daghet in den Oosten" (The Daghet in the East)	Jacques De Weerdt	1906	
32 Oostenstraat	Citroen-Cahn House	Jacques De Weerdt	1908	
34 Oostenstraat	Leys House	Jacques De Weerdt	1906	
17 Schorpioenstraat	De Graaf House	Jacques De Weerdt	1906	
47 Velodroomstraat	Claessens House	Jacques De Weerdt	1907	
48/50 Zénobe Grammestraat	Églantine House	Jacques De Weerdt	1908	

==== "Golden Triangle" of Art Nouveau ====
Address	Name	Architect(s)	Date	Image
42 Cogels Osylei	Villa of the Waterlilies	August Cols and Alfried Defever	1900	
44 Cogels Osylei	Iris de Lischbloem	T. Van den Bossche	1898	
46 Cogels Osylei	De Roos House	Jules Hofman	1898	
50 Cogels Osylei	Zonnebloem (Sunflower) House	Jules Hofman	1900	
55 Cogels Osylei	De Morgenster House ("Morning Star")	Joseph Bascourt	1904	
59 Cogels Osylei	De Zonnewijzer House	August Cols and Alfried Defever	1909	
80 Cogels Osylei	"Quinten Matsys" House	Jacques De Weerdt	1904	
27-30 Generaal Van Merlenstraat	Ensemble "Winter, Spring, Summer, Autumn" - four houses at the intersection with the Waterloostraat	Joseph Bascourt	1899	
18 Transvaalstraat	unnamed	Alfried Defever	1914	
30 Transvaalstraat	Talkowski House	Jacques De Weerdt	1906	
42 Transvaalstraat	"Mon Repos" ("My Rest") House	Albert Gondrexon	1901	
52/54 Transvaalstraat	Lotus and Papyrus (double) Houses	Joseph Bascourt	1901	
56 Transvaalstraat	Boreas House	Joseph Bascourt	1898	
62 Transvaalstraat	De Roos House	Jules Hofman	1899	
2 Waterloostraat	De Margriet House	Jules Hofman	1900	
8/10/12 Waterloostraat	Ensemble De Pauw	August Cols and Alfried Defever	1900	
11 Waterloostraat	House of the Battle of Waterloo	Frans Smet-Verhas	1905	
14/16/18 Waterloostraat	unnamed	Frans Smet-Verhas	1901	
26/28 Waterloostraat	Ensemble De Mot	Jacques De Weerdt	1904	
27 Waterloostraat	Verheyen House	Jacques De Weerdt	1904	
30 Waterloostraat	Napoleon House	Jacques De Weerdt	1904	
31 Waterloostraat	Nymphea House	Joseph Bascourt	1904	
39 Waterloostraat	Seagulls House	Jacques De Weerdt	1905	
49/51 Waterloostraat	Ensemble Baeckelmans	Joseph Baeckelmans	1905	
53 Waterloostraat	Smeyers House	Adolphe van Coppernolle	1904	
55-63 Waterloostraat	Ensemble Den Tijd ("The Weather")	August Cols and Alfried Defever	1903	

=== Other Districts of Antwerp ===
Address	Name	Architect(s)	Date	Image
22 Beeldhouwerstraat	unnamed	W. van Oenen	1901	
24 Harmoniestraat	Maquinay Carriage House	E. Thielens	1902	
Koningin Astridplein	Royal Society for Zoology	Emile van Averbeke	1899	
25 Koningin Astridplein	Crèmerie Flamingo (formerly Café-Restaurant Páon Royal)	Emile van Averbeke and E. Thielens	1899	
12 Lange Lobroekstraat	unnamed	Jacques de Weerdt	1910	
14 Lange Lobroekstraat	De Dageraad House	Jacques de Weerdt	1907	
40 Oudekerkstraat	Selderslachts-Clasman House	Frans Smet-Verhas	1904	
122-126 Paleisstraat	Fire Station	Émile Van Averbeke and Jan Van Asperen	1907	
52 Sanderusstraat	unnamed	Émile Van Averbeke	1908	
2 Schildersstraat	House of the 5 Continents	Frans Smet-Verhas	1901	
40 Volkstraat	Maison du Peuple - Help U Zelve cooperative	Émile Van Averbeke and Jan van Asperen	1901	
34 Peter Benoitstraat	unnamed	Emile Thielens	1898	
