= Verhas =

Verhas is a surname. Notable people with the surname include:

- Frans Smet-Verhas (1851–1925), Belgian architect
- Frans Verhas (1827–1897), Belgian painter
- Jan Verhas (1834–1896), Belgian painter
