= Joseph Bascourt =

Belgian architect

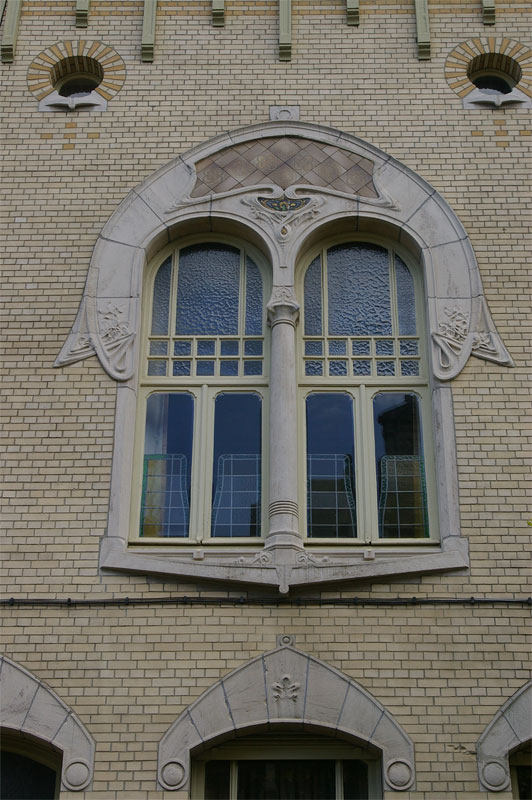
De Morgenster ("The Morningstar"; 1904), at Cogels-Osylei 55 in the Zurenborg area of Antwerp, is a typical Art Nouveau design by Joseph Bascourt

Joseph Bascourt (15 September 1863 in Brussels – 6 March 1927 Antwerp) was a Belgian architect who designed numerous Art Nouveau buildings in and around Antwerp. Among his contributions to the landscape of the city are 25 houses in the Zurenborg neighbourhood, and the community centre in Wilrijk (1914–20).

He also designed the Nottebohm Clinic (Biartstraat 2, 2018 Antwerp), founded as a skin clinic, still in use as a home for the elderly.
