= Émile Van Averbeke =

Belgian architect (1876–1946)

Emile (or Emiel) Van Averbeke (10 July 1876 in Berchem – 1 February 1946 in Deurne) was a Belgian architect and graphic artist. He attended the Royal Academy of Fine Arts (Antwerp), where he also worked under Emil Thielens later on, from 1892 to 1899. His style shows French as well as English influences. Together with the Belgian architect Jan Van Asperen, he designed the Antwerp contribution to the Milan International of 1906.

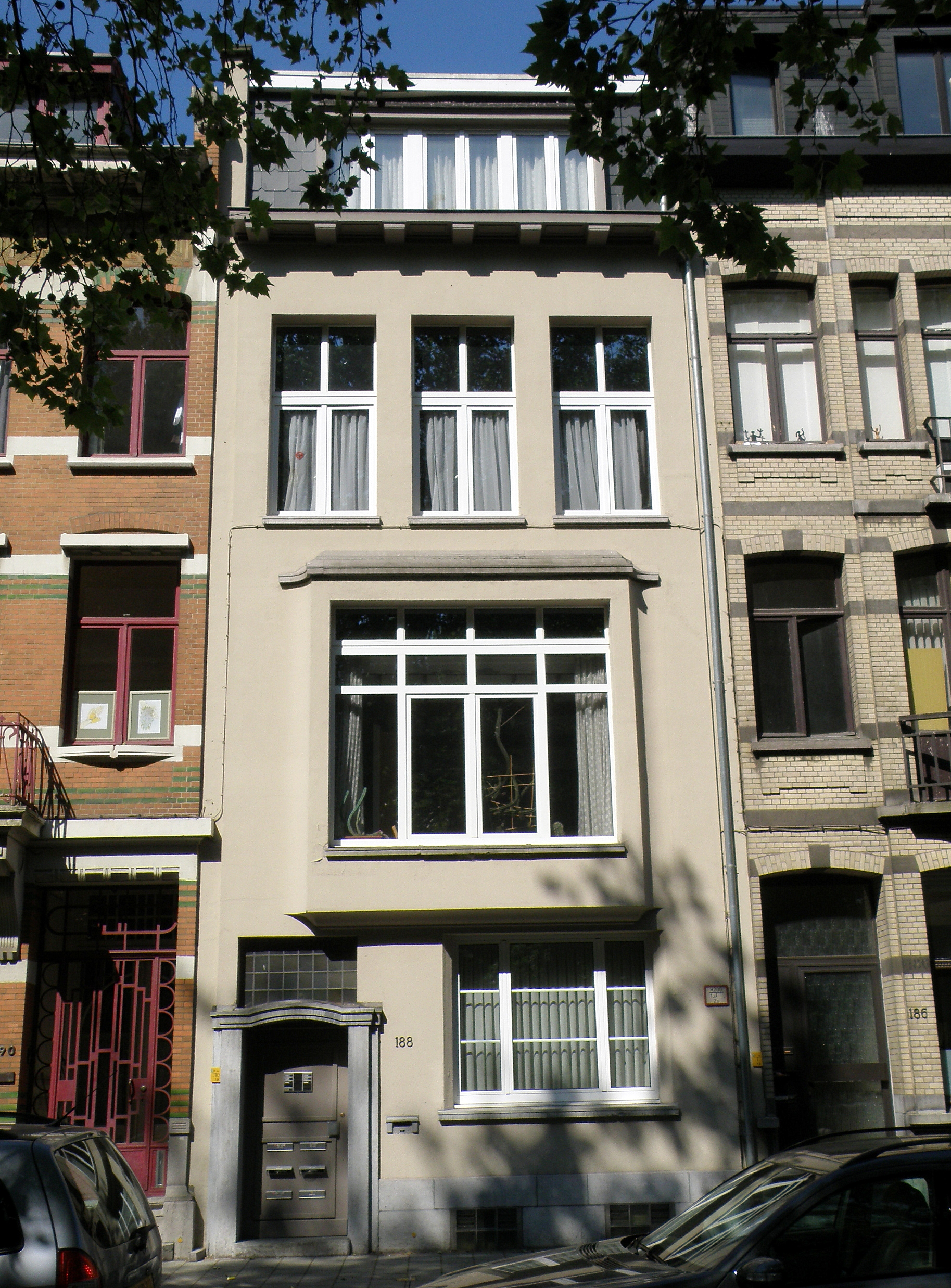
Van Averbeke's residence in Antwerp

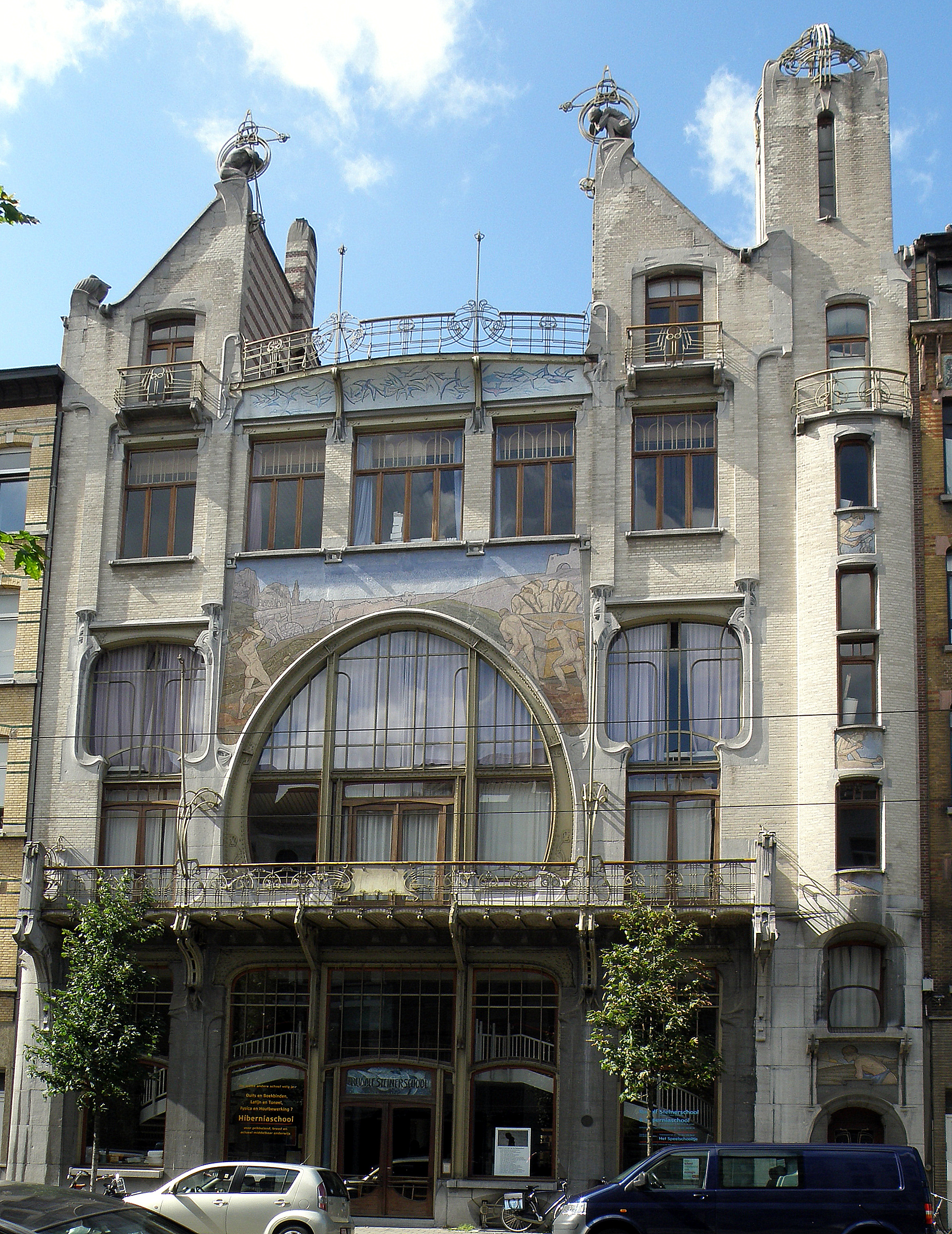
L'ancienne Maison du Peuple libérale d'Anvers (Dutch: Liberaal Volkhuis van Antwerpen) building designed by Jan van Asperen and Émile Van Averbeke in 1901
