= Vlaams Tram- en Autobusmuseum =

Transit museum in Antwerp, Belgium

Flemish Tram and Bus Museum
- Vlaams Tram- en Autobusmuseum
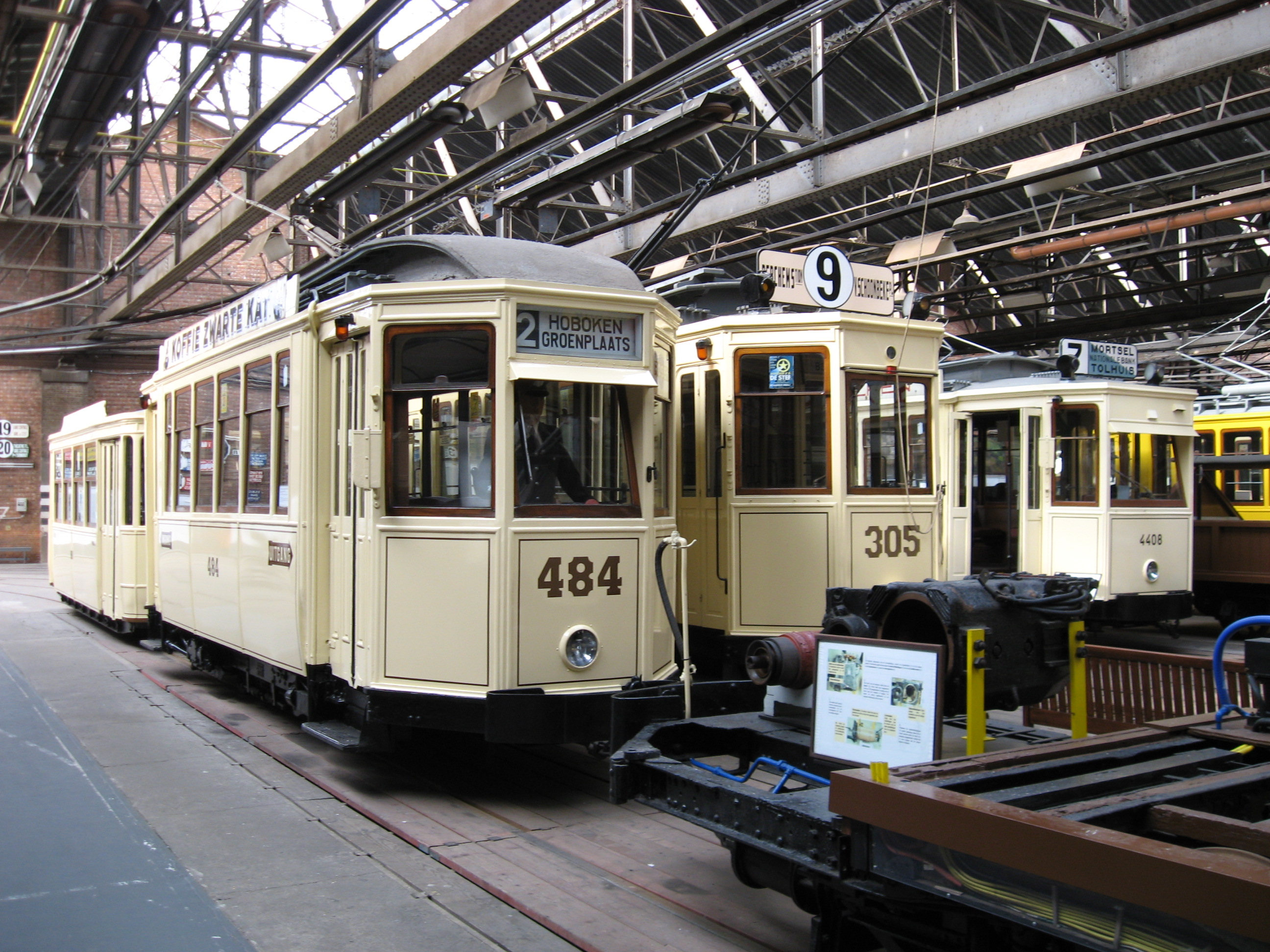
- Trams in the museum
- Location: Berchem, Antwerp
- Coordinates: 51°11′59″N 4°26′24″E
- Type: Transport Museum
- Collections: Trams and buses
- Public transit access: Tram lines 4 & 9; NMBS Antwerpen-Berchem station
- Website: www.vlatam.be

The Flemish Tram and Bus Museum (Dutch: Vlaams Tram- en Autobusmuseum, abbreviated as VlaTAM) is a museum of public transport that exhibits historical trams and buses. The museum is situated in the Berchem district of Antwerp, in the former tram shed of Groenenhoek, dating from 1912.

== History ==
In 1961, the Tram Museum Association was founded by a group of tram enthusiasts, who in 1962, opened the Buurtspoorwegmuseum, in Schepdaal. As this collection grew a second museum, initially known as the Antwerp Tram and Bus Museum, was opened in Edegem. The tramshed in which the museum is currently housed ceased to be used in 1996, with the collection from Edegem being moved over in 2000, to allow it to be opened as a museum on 5 May 2001. The museum was opened by Steve Stevaert, who was Vice-President of the Flemish Government and the Flemish Minister of Mobility, Public Works and Energy.

The museum is supported by transport company De Lijn. It mainly exhibits trams and buses of the Vicinal company, the city tram companies of Antwerp and Ghent, and the various subcontractors of Vicinal and De Lijn. Its collection includes the only surviving gyrobus in the world and the first electric tram built for Antwerp, as well as numerous other artefacts connected to the history of public transport in Belgium.

The museum was closed in 2010 for repairs, and reopened to the general public on 16 June 2019 after renovation of the roof of the building. The archives and the library of the museum are open by appointment.

The museum holds more than 55 vehicles, dating from 1873 to the present day.
