= Gyrobus =

Flywheel-powered electric bus

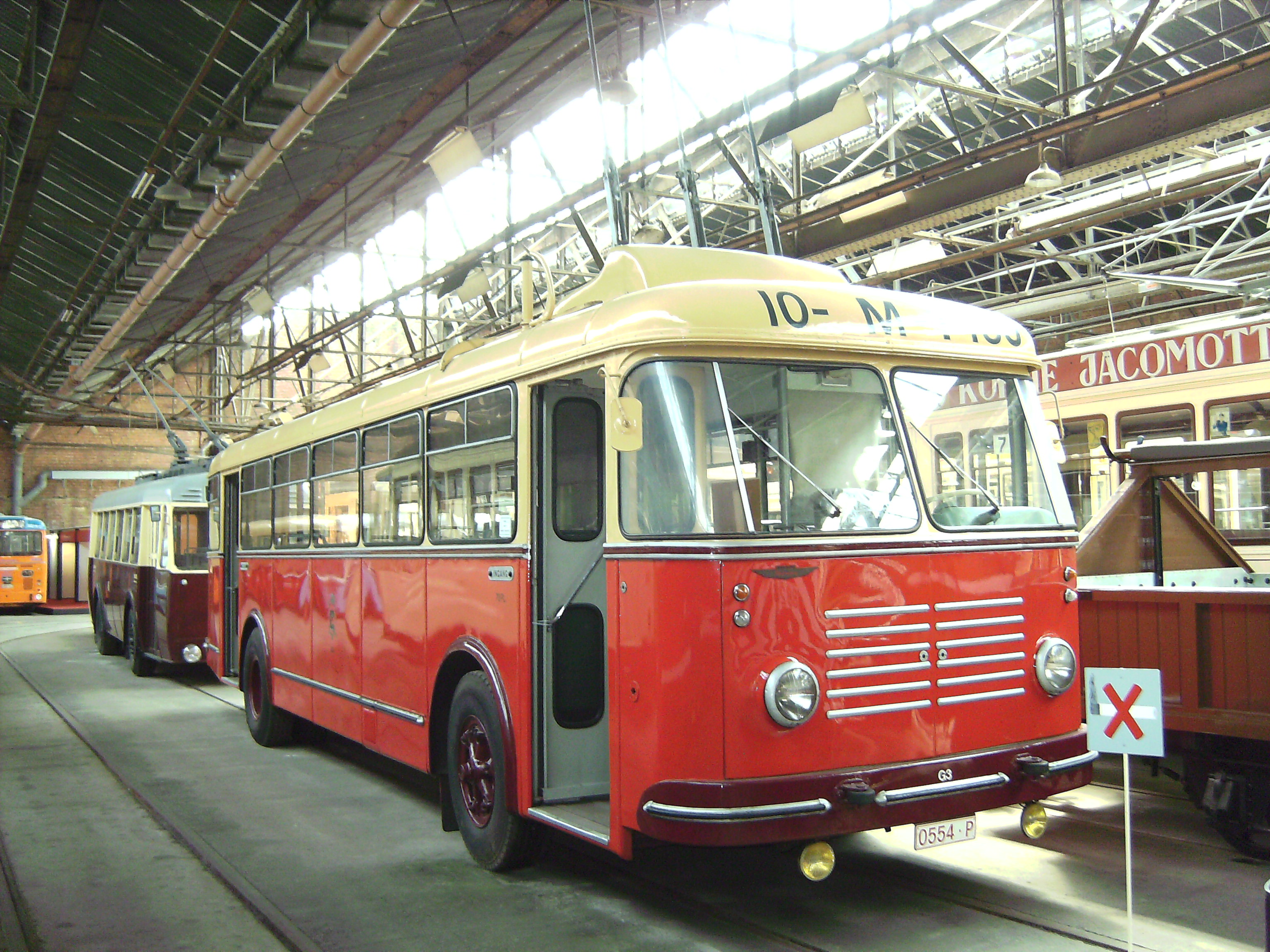
Gyrobus G3 (built in 1955), the only surviving gyrobus in the world in the Flemish tramway and bus museum, Antwerp

A gyrobus is an electric bus that uses flywheel energy storage, not overhead wires like a trolleybus. The name comes from the Greek language term for flywheel, gyros. There are no gyrobuses currently in use commercially.

== Development ==
The concept of a flywheel-powered bus was developed and brought to fruition during the 1940s by Oerlikon (of Switzerland), with the intention of creating an alternative to trolleybuses for quieter, lower-frequency routes, where full overhead-wire electrification could not be justified.

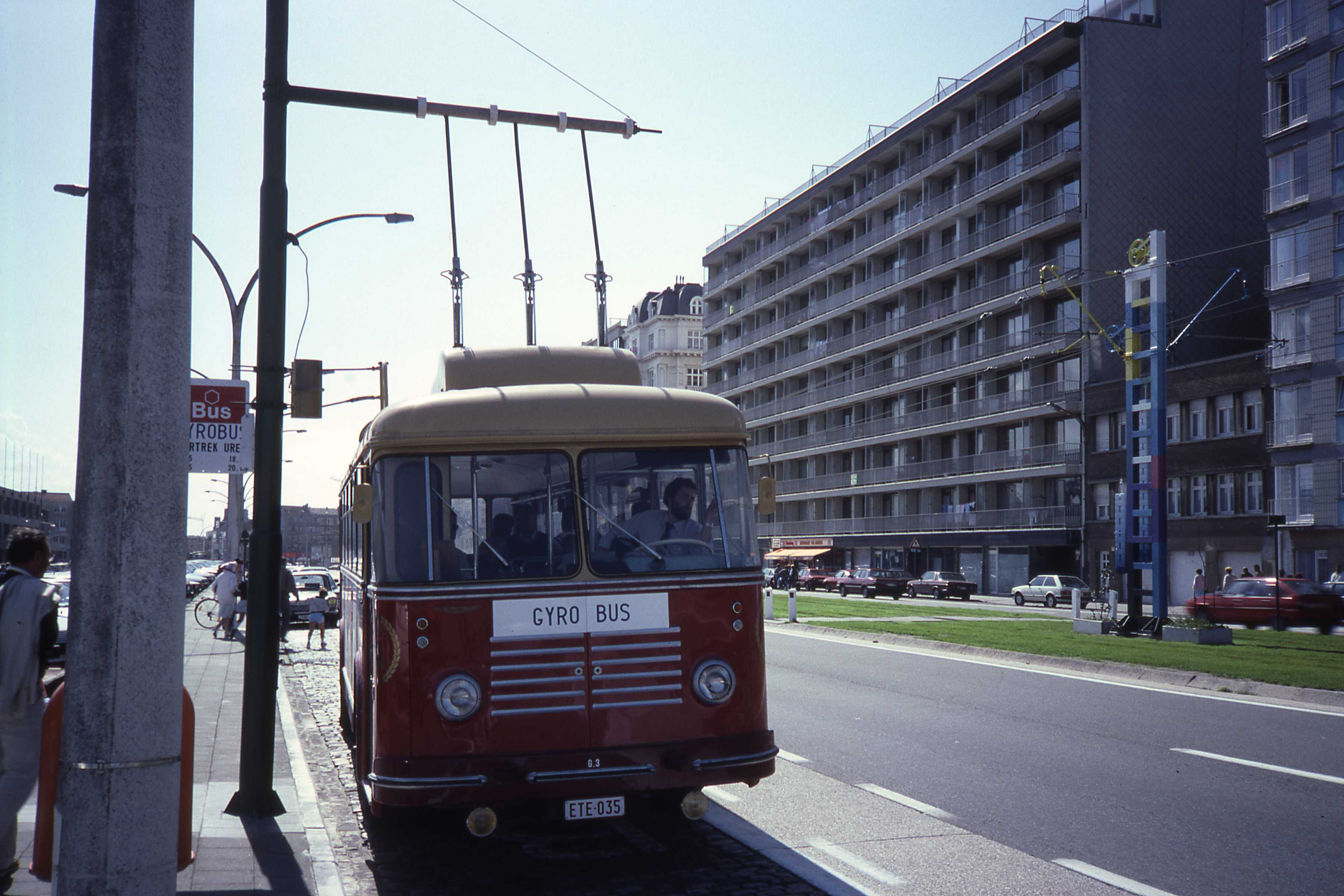
Loading up the flywheel with three-phase charging

Rather than carrying an internal combustion engine or batteries, or connecting to overhead powerlines, a gyrobus carries a large flywheel that is spun at up to 3,000 RPM by a "squirrel cage" motor. Power for charging the flywheel was sourced by means of three booms mounted on the vehicle's roof, which contacted charging points located as required or where appropriate (at passenger stops en route, or at terminals, for instance). To obtain tractive power, capacitors would excite the flywheel's charging motor so that it became a generator, in this way transforming the energy stored in the flywheel back into electricity. Vehicle braking was electric, and some of the energy was recycled back into the flywheel, thereby extending its range.

Fully charged, a gyrobus could typically travel as far as 6 km (3.7 mi) on a level route at speeds of up to 50 to 60 km/h (31 to 37 mph), depending on the total weight of passengers, as top speeds varied as passenger levels varied from stop to stop. The installation in Yverdon-les-Bains (Switzerland) sometimes saw vehicles needing to travel as far as 10 km (6.2 mi) on one charge, although it is not known how well they performed towards the upper end of that distance.

Charging a flywheel took between 30 seconds and 3 minutes; in an effort to reduce the charge time, the supply voltage was increased from 380 volts to 500 volts. Given the relatively restricted range between charges, it is likely that several charging stops would have been required on longer routes, or in dense urban traffic. It is not clear whether vehicles that require such frequent delays would have been practical and/or suitable for modern-day service applications.

The demonstrator was first displayed (and used) publicly in summer 1950 and, to promote the system, this vehicle continued to be used for short periods of public service in myriad locations at least until 1954.

In 1979, General Electric was awarded a $5 million four-year contract by the United States government, the Department of Energy and the Department of Transportation, to develop a prototype flywheel bus.

In the 1980s, Volvo briefly experimented with using flywheels charged by a small diesel engine and recharged via braking energy. This was eventually dumped in favour of using hydraulic accumulators.

During the 1990s, the Dutch Centre for Concepts in Mechatronics had developed a flywheel for both mobile and stationary applications.

In 2005, the Center for Transportation and the Environment, working with the University of Texas at Austin, Center for Electromechanics, Test Devices, Inc., and DRS Technologies sought funding for the development of a prototype gyrobus.

== Early commercial service ==
The first full commercial service began in October 1953, linking the Swiss communities of Yverdon-les-Bains and Grandson. However, this was a route with limited traffic potential, and although technically successful it was not commercially viable. Services ended in late October 1960, and neither of the two vehicles (nor the demonstrator) survived.

The next system to open was in Léopoldville in Belgian Congo (now Kinshasa in the Democratic Republic of the Congo). Here there were 12 vehicles (although apparently some reports suggest 17), which operated over four routes, with recharging facilities being provided about every 2 km (1.2 mi). These were the largest of the gyrobuses, being 10.4 m (34 ft) in length, weighing 10.9 tonnes (10.7 long tons; 12.0 short tons), carrying up to 90 passengers, and having a maximum speed of 60 km/h (37 mph). There were major problems related to excessive "wear and tear". One significant reason for this was that drivers often took shortcuts across unpaved roads, which after rains became nothing more than quagmires. Other problems included breakage of gyro ball bearings, and high humidity resulting in traction motor overload. The system's demise, however, came because of high energy consumption. The bus operator deemed that 3.4 kWh/km per gyrobus was unaffordable, so closure came in the summer of 1959 with the gyrobuses being abandoned and replaced with diesel buses.

The third location to use gyrobuses commercially was Ghent, Belgium. Three gyrobuses started operation in late summer 1956 on a route linking Ghent and Merelbeke. The flywheel was in the center of the bus, spanning almost the whole width of the vehicle, and having a vertical axis of rotation. The Ghent to Merelbeke route was intended to be the first of a proposed multi-route network; instead, its gyrobuses stayed in service for only three years, being withdrawn late autumn 1959. The operator considered them unreliable, "spending more time off the road than on", and that their weight damaged road surfaces. They were also considered to be energy hungry, consuming 2.9 kWh/km—compared with between 2.0 kWh/km and 2.4 kWh/km for trams with much greater capacity.

One of Ghent's gyrobuses has been preserved and restored, and is displayed at the VlaTAM-museum in Antwerp. It is sometimes shown (and used to carry passengers) at Belgian exhibitions, transport enthusiasts' bazaars, etc. The tram depot in Merelbeke has been closed since 1998, but it still stands, as it is protected by the law.

=== Advantages ===
- Quiet
- "Pollution-free" (Pollution confined to generators on electric power grid.)
- Runs without rails (An advantage because the route can be varied at will.)
- Can operate flexibly at varying distances

=== Disadvantages ===
- Weight: a bus which can carry 20 persons and has a range of 2 km (1.2 mi) requires a flywheel weighing about 3 tons.
- The flywheel, which turns at 3000 revolutions per minute, requires special attachment and security—because the external speed of the disk is 900 km/h (560 mph).
- Driving a gyrobus has the added complexity that the flywheel acts as a gyroscope that will resist changes in orientation, for example when a bus tilts while making a turn, assuming that the flywheel has a horizontal rotation axis. This effect can be counteracted by using two coaxial contra-rotating flywheels.

== Further developments ==
Since 2005, Dresden, Germany has had an Autotram, a vehicle that uses a fuel cell as its main source of energy and a small flywheel for regenerative braking only.

== Gallery ==
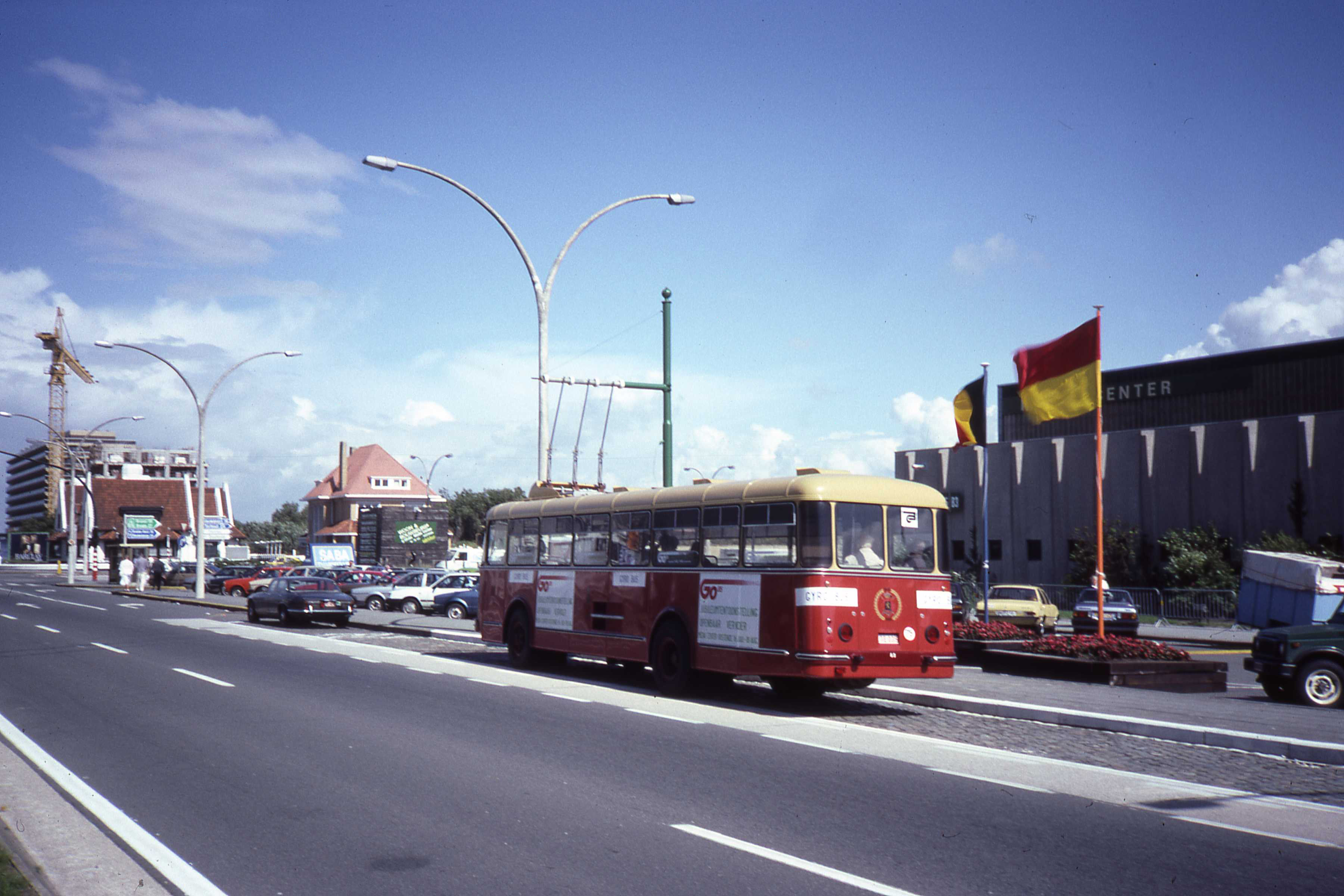
Loading up the flywheel

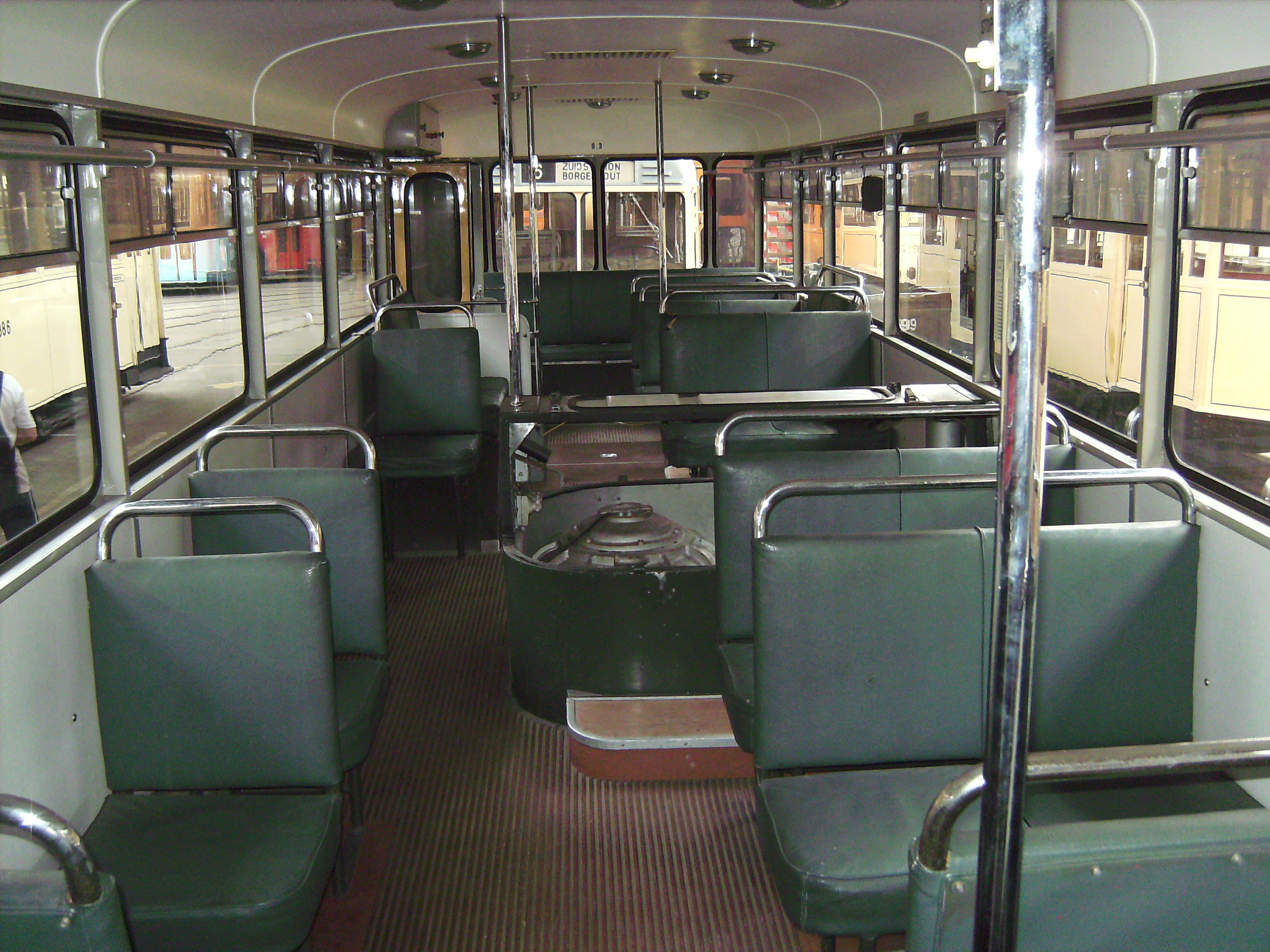
Interior of the Gyrobus G3 (front)

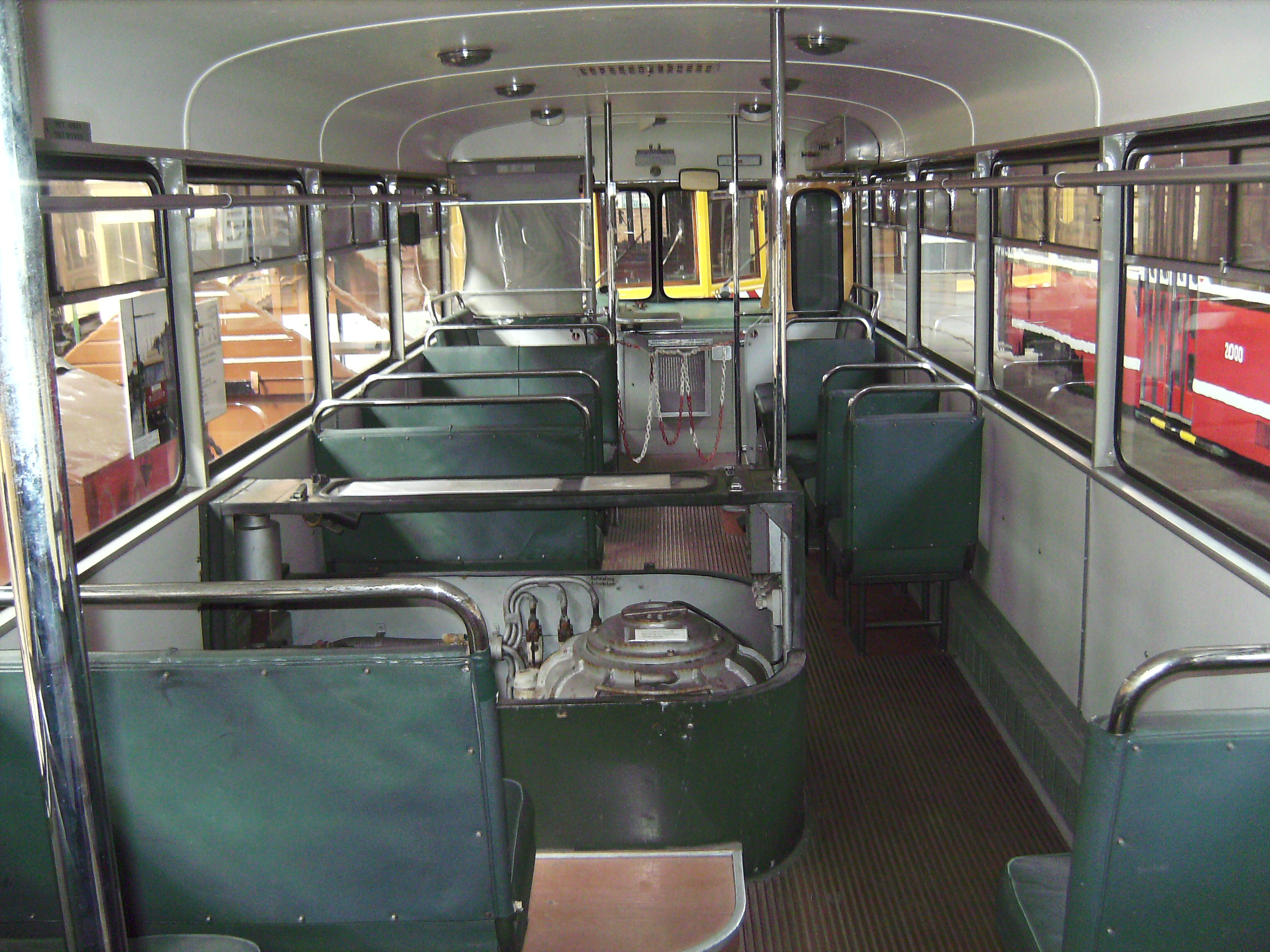
Interior of the Gyrobus G3 (back)

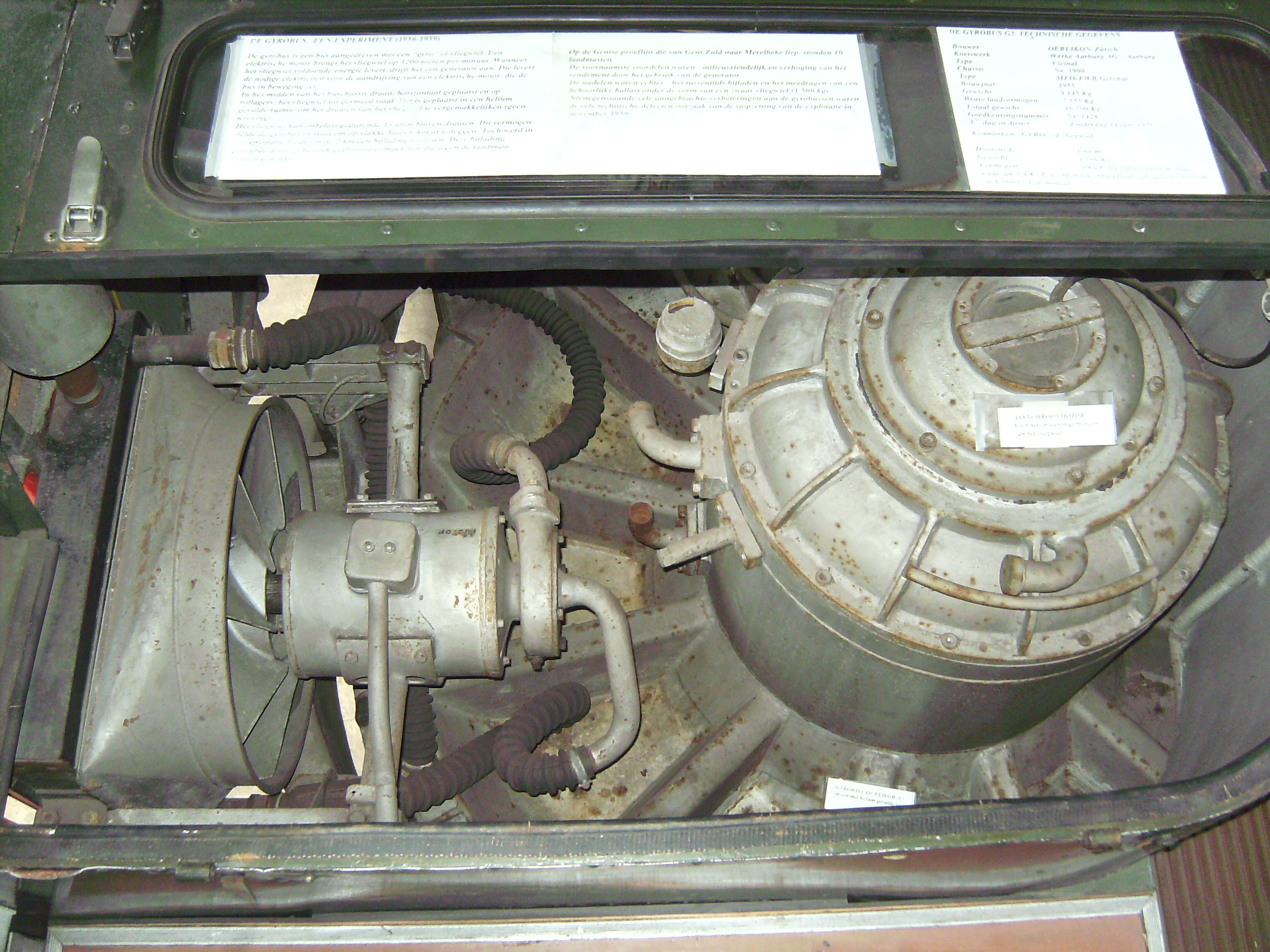
Engine of the Gyrobus G3

== See also ==
- Electric bus
- List of buses
- OLEV
- Parry People Movers - a British train that uses fly wheel energy storage
