= Tram route 11 (Antwerp) =

- Itinerary of tram route 11

Overview
- Locale: Antwerp
- Termini: Melkmarkt; Antwerpen-Berchem railway station
- Stations: 27
- Color on map: red text on a white background

Service
- Type: tram
- System: Antwerp tram network
- Operator(s): De Lijn
- Rolling stock: PCC

History
- Opened: October 9, 1902

Tram route 11 is an above ground tram route in the city of Antwerp, Belgium. It currently runs between the Antwerpen-Berchem railway station and the Melkmarkt in the city centre.

== History ==
Originally, the route was operated as a horse-drawn omnibus route running between the Grote Markt and the Zurenborg neighborhood. At the start of the 20th century, the line was electrified and extended to the Eksterlaar neighborhood. Until the end of 1964, route 11 operated between Antwerp-Central station and Eksterlaar. Beginning January 1, 1965, the route was extended to the Melkmarkt, after tram route 16 (Melkmarkt-Luchtbal) was canceled.

During a part of the 1990s, trams on route 11 used the premetro network via the entrance at the Mercatorstraat, due to construction works at the Ommeganckstraat. The TTB organization, representing commuters in Flanders, proposed in it plans to shorten route 11 to the Melkmarkt-Antwerpen-Berchem trajectory, and introduce a new tram route 18, running between the Melkmarkt and the Luchtbal neighborhood using the premetro network. This part of the plan was not executed at the time, however a new tram route 6 was introduced in 2006, connecting the Luchtbal and Olympiade neighborhoods.

Following a redrawing of the Antwerp tram network on September 1, 2012, the route was eventually shortened to the Melkmarkt-Antwerpen-Berchem itinerary. A new route 9 since then connects the Eksterlaar terminus with Linkeroever via the southern and central premetro axes. At the same time, the frequency of service on the line was also reduced.

== Future ==
There exist plans to extend either route 9 or 11 in the future to a new terminus at Borsbeek, or at Antwerp Airport in Deurne.

== Rolling stock ==
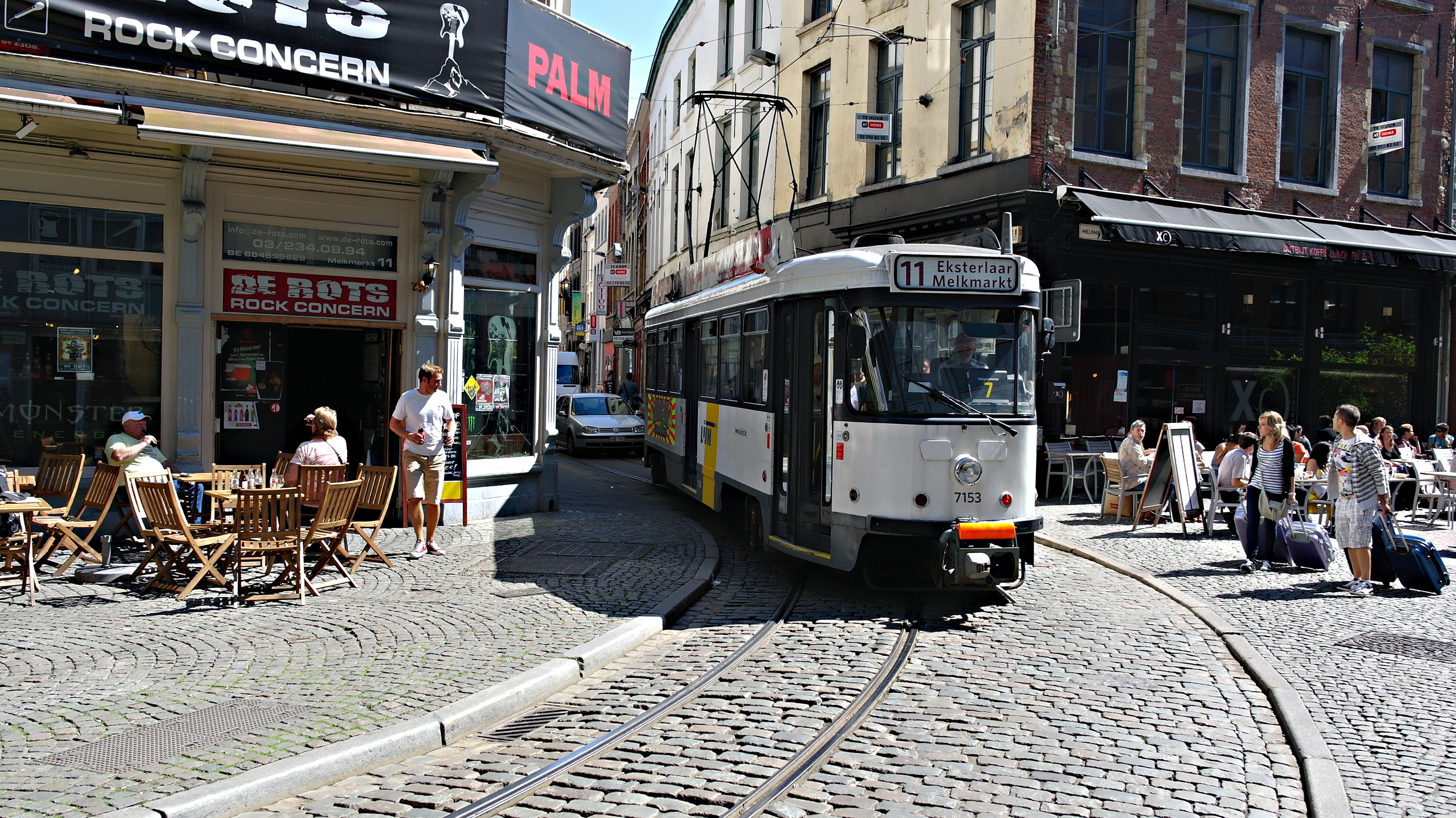
A PPC car on route 11 entering the Korte Koepoortstraat

The route is mostly operated by single PCC cars, with newer HermeLijn trams being used only occasionally.

== Colour ==
Historically, tram route 11 has always been marked by either a red background or a red font. On October 27, 2007, the colors were changed to a white font on a turquoise background. However, these were later reverted to the original red letters on a white background, after commuters complained that the turquoise was too similar to the green used by tram route 10.
