= Berchem =

- District of Antwerp
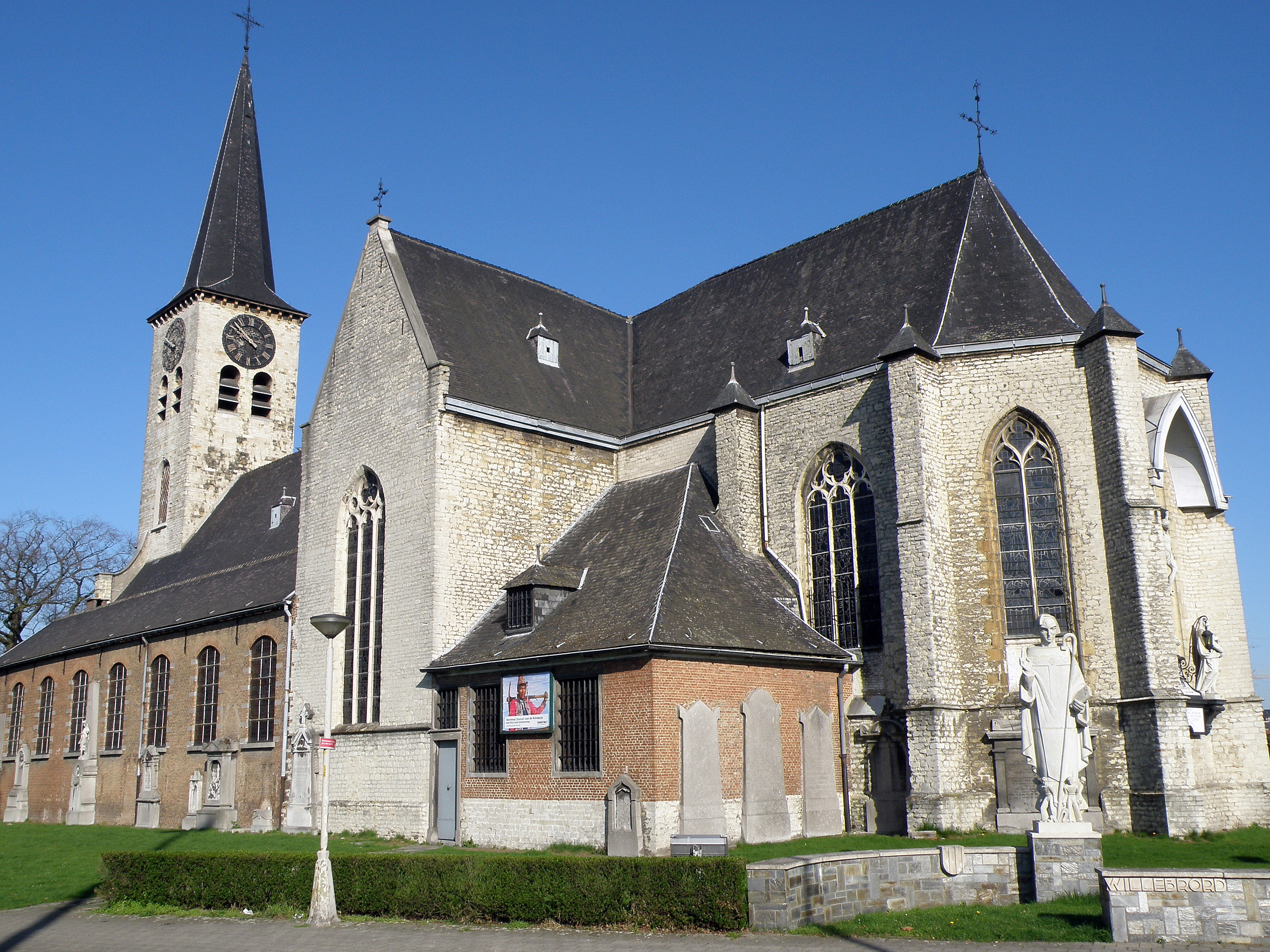

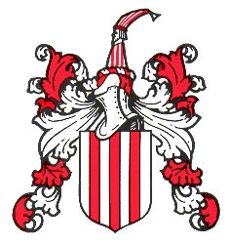
- Flag Coat of arms
- Interactive map of Berchem
- Location within Belgium Location within Antwerp Province
- Coordinates: 51°12′00″N 4°25′00″E
- Country: Belgium
- Community: Flemish Community
- Region: Flemish Region
- Province: Antwerp
- Arrondissement: Antwerp
- Municipality: Antwerp

Area
  - Total: 5.79 km^{2} (2.24 sq mi)

Population (2025-01-01)
  - Total: 44,189
  - Density: 7,630/km^{2} (19,800/sq mi)
- Postal codes: 2600
- Area codes: 03

Berchem (Dutch pronunciation: [ˈbɛrxɛm]) is a southern district of the municipality and city of Antwerp in the Flemish Region of Belgium. Berchem is located along the old Grote Steenweg (Dutch for 'Big Paved Road') that has connected Brussels to Antwerp for several centuries; the town borders the districts of Deurne, Borgerhout, Wilrijk and Antwerp and the municipality of Mortsel. Berchem itself consists of three quarters, Oud Berchem, Groenenhoek and Nieuw Kwartier.

The 'Ring', Antwerp's circular motorway which follows the track of the former city defense walls, cuts Berchem in two parts, separating the urban inner city area of Oud-Berchem (intra muros) from the more residential and suburban areas Groenenhoek, Pulhof and Nieuw Kwartier (extra muros).

It was a separate municipality until 1983. On 1 January 1983, it was absorbed into the municipality of Greater Antwerp whereby Berchem became one of the 9 districts.

== Political structure ==
After the decentralization of Antwerp in 2000, Berchem became a semi-independent district with its own legislative body, the so-called Districtsraad (District Council), and its own executive college. The District Council includes 25 members, directly elected for six-year terms by popular vote. The executive college comprises six Aldermen (Districtsschepenen), including a District Mayor (Districtsburgemeester), who are installed by the District Council.

== Points of interest ==
The Zurenborg area hosts a high concentration of Art Nouveau and other fin-de-siècle style townhouses, many built between 1894 and 1906. The main streets of interest are Cogels-Osylei, Transvaalstraat, and Waterloostraat. After the area was slated for demolition in the 1960s, to be replaced with a business and office complex, demolition was prevented when the area got monumental status in the 1980s. In recent years, the area has become an attraction for architecture-minded visitors.

The Driekoningenstraat - Statiestraat is the main shopping and commercial area of Berchem. Though suffering competition from suburban shopping centers, the retail highstreet still has an interesting mix of Belgian, local, and international convenience and non-food stores. The highstreet has recently been refurbished, giving more space to pedestrians.

The Groenenhoek is home to the Flemish Tram and Bus Museum.

== Transport ==
The railway station of Antwerpen-Berchem, located within the district, is the second largest station in the city of Antwerp. With a few exceptions, such as the Thalys high-speed train, almost all trains stopping in Antwerp have a stop at Antwerpen-Berchem station. The district of Berchem is also served by the Antwerp tram routes 4, 7, 9, 11 and 15, and numerous bus lines, which connect Berchem with the bordering districts and communities, and are operated by the Flemish transport company De Lijn.

== Sports ==
The local football team is Koninklijk Berchem Sport.

== Notable people ==
See the Category:People from Berchem.
