= Frans Smet-Verhas =

Belgian architect

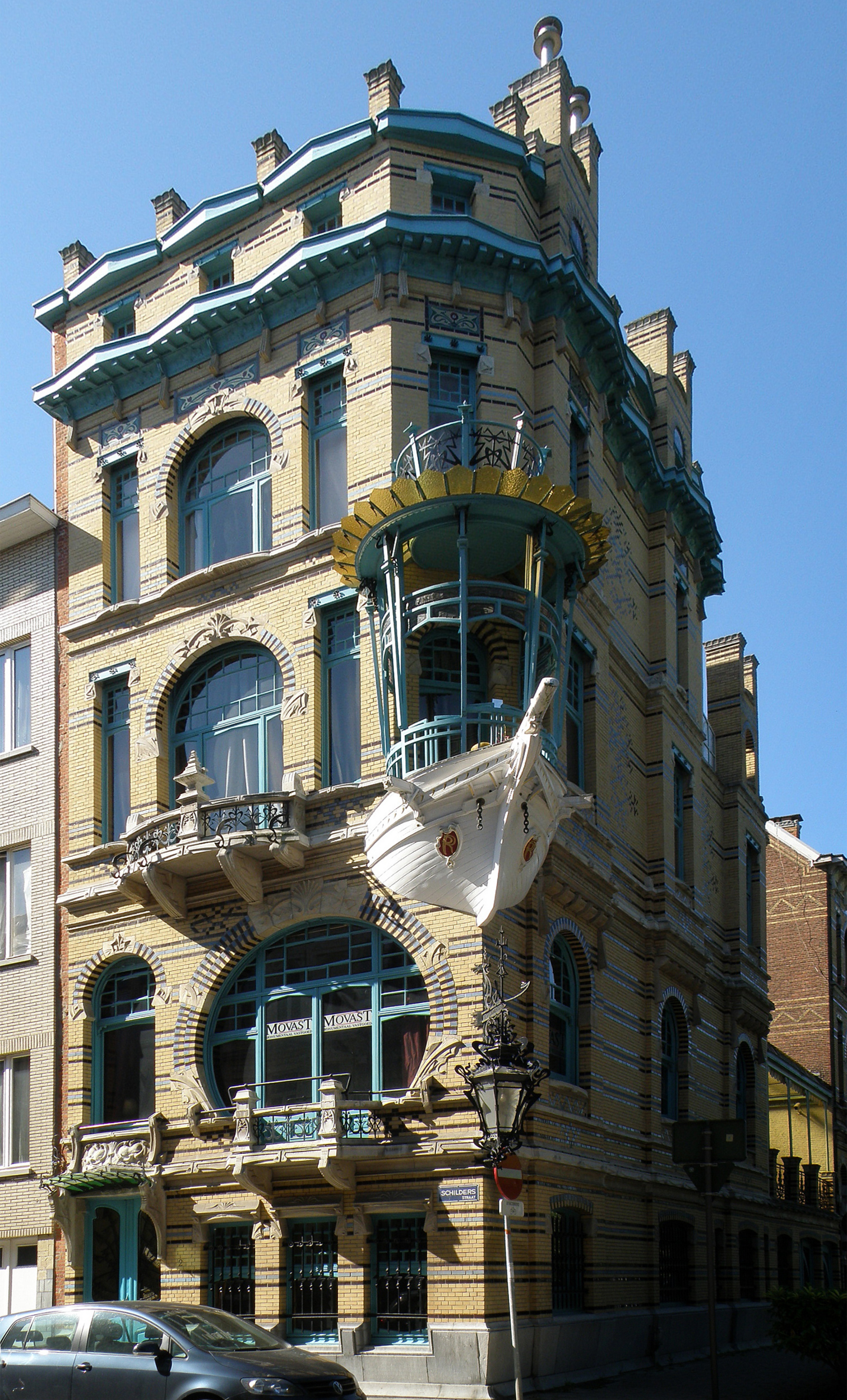
House of the Five Continents, Antwerp (1905)

Frans Smet-Verhas, birth name Joannes Franciscus Smet and initially known as Frans Smet (Temse, 21 August 1851 – Antwerp, 20 March 1925), was a Belgian architect. He was a pioneer in introducing the Art Nouveau style in Antwerp building designs at the beginning of the twentieth century. He is known for his exuberant style characterized by its eclecticism, use of floral forms, color variations in construction materials and picturesque details.

== Life ==
Smet-Verhas was born in Temse as the son of Joannes (Jan) Smet, a carpenter, and Juliana Muys. He married Sophia Verhas, a dressmaker, in Antwerp on 31 March 1884. and took the surname Smet-Verhas from 1887. The couple's son Arthur Smet (1886–1974) also became an architect and later taught Renaat Braem. A daughter named Zulma Josephina Joanna Smet born on 11 February 1889 in Antwerp died on 6 April 1889.

He was active as an architect from the early 1880s until around 1910, mostly in Antwerp. He originally designed various buildings in the eclectic and Flemish Renaissance-revival styles. From around 1900 he became one of the major proponents of the Art Nouveau style in Antwerp. He designed two of the most famous Art Nouveau structures in the city: the eccentric House of the Five Continents (Huis de Vijf Werelddelen), finished in 1901, and the House of the Battle of Waterloo (Huis De Slag van Waterloo), built in 1905.

House of the Battle of Waterloo, Antwerp, 1905.

== Major works ==
All in Antwerp unless otherwise noted

- Hôtel Het Zuidkasteel, Bolivarplaats, 2 (1882), eclectic
- Post Office, Arendstraat 52 (1891), Flemish Renaissance-revival
- Group of houses "Den Overvloed en Den Ooievaar" (The Affluence and the Stork), Cogels Osylei, 3/5/7 (1896), Flemish Renaissance-revival
- Kunstenaarswoning (House and studio) Jef Koefoed, Anselmostraat 86 (1898), eclectic
- Houses at Waterloostraat, numbers 14, 16, 18 (1901), Art Nouveau
- House of the Five Continents (Huis De Vijf Werelddelen) (1901), Art Nouveau
- Selderslachts-Clasman House (1904), Art Nouveau
- House of the Battle of Waterloo (Huis De Slag van Waterloo) (1905), Art Nouveau
- Schroyens House (1908), Art Nouveau

== See also ==
- Art Nouveau in Antwerp

== Bibliography ==
- Françoise Dierkens-Aubry and Jos Vandenbreeden, Art nouveau en Belgique: Architecture et Intérieurs (Paris: Duculot, 1991).
