= Tram route 4 (Antwerp) =

- Itinerary of tram route 4

Overview
- Locale: Antwerp
- Termini: Deurne Silsburg; Hoboken Kioskplaats
- Stations: 40
- Color on map: black text on light blue background

Service
- Type: tram
- System: Antwerp tram network
- Operator(s): De Lijn
- Rolling stock: PCC (single and coupled), HermeLijn, five segment Albatros

Tram route 4 is an above ground tram route in the city of Antwerp, Belgium. The route runs between the Kioskplaats in the suburb of Hoboken in the South, and the Silsburg cemetery on the Deurne/Wommelgem border in the East. The present day itinerary is the result of the merger of the trajectory from the historic route 8 and that from the original route 4 in 2012.

== History ==
Route 4 is one of the oldest tram routes in the city of Antwerp. It was originally built as a part of a vicinal tramway to Schelle and Boom, but was eventually shortened to the itinerary Groenplaats-Hoboken after the opening of railway line 52 In 1936, it was merged with route 3 into an itinerary Merksem-Central station-Groenplaats-South Station-Hoboken, because too many tram routes had their terminus at the Groenplaats at the time, leading to a chaotic situation. After the end of the Second World War, the route again became a separate line. In 1993, it was extended from the Groenplaats to the Sint-Pietersvliet to the North.

Due to construction works in the Nationalestraat, the route was shortened to the Hoboken-Marnixplaats trajectory on May 2, 2012. After a redrawing of the network map, route 4 was merged with tram route 8 on February 9, 2013, running between Hoboken to the South and Silsburg to the East. At first, the tram tracks on the Leien were used to connect the two trajectories, but after the reopening of the Nationalestraat on March 30, service via the Nationalestraat and Groenplaats was resumed. On December 6, 2014, the new tram tracks in the Brusselstraat were taken into service, and route 4 now drives between Hoboken and the Nationalestraat via the Bolivarplaats, instead of the Geuzenstraat.

== Colour ==
Route 4 is usually identified by a black number 4 on a light blue background.

== Statistics ==
With a length af 14.55 km and 40 stops, route 4 is currently both the longest tram route, and that with most stops, in Antwerp.
