= Zurenborg =

Area of Antwerp, Belgium

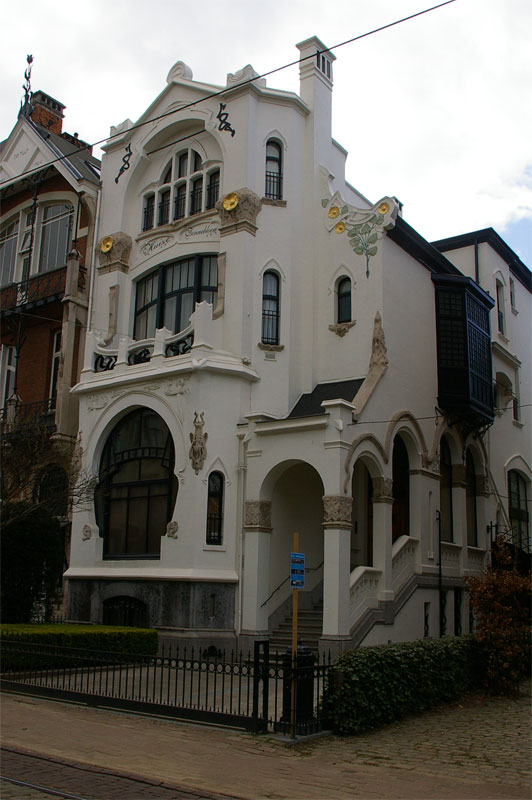
De Zonnebloem ("The Sunflower"; 1900) by architect Jules Hofman characteristically incorporates the "organic" nature so prevalent in Art Nouveau design both in theme and concept

Zurenborg is an area in south-east Antwerp largely developed between 1894 and 1906 that features a high concentration of townhouses in Art Nouveau and other fin-de-siècle styles.

Together with Zuid, the urban quarter around the Royal Museum of Fine Arts, Zurenborg is unique in Antwerp in that it is among the few areas in the city developed according to an urban plan in the late 19th century. The new neighbourhood reflected Antwerp's growing wealth, linked to growing port and trade activities, well. The northern - largest - area of Zurenborg, centered around Dageraadplaats, was mainly developed for the middle class, while the southern area, around Cogels Osylei, was mainly targeted to the well to do. The most eastern corner, which currently includes a bus yard of the public transport company and a power transfer station, was more devoted to industries and logistics, including a gas factory and a terminus station of a regional tram system. Engetrim, a development and construction company, had the lead in developing Zurenborg. Before, Zurenborg was an agricultural area dominated by an estate belonging to the Osy family.

== Houses in Zurenborg ==
=== Location ===
Art Nouveau houses are interspersed with neoclassical mansions and other eclectic architectural styles throughout Zurenborg, which straddles the boundary between Antwerp itself and the district of Berchem. The southern part, which falls within Berchem and is centred on Cogels-Osylei (or Cogels-Osy Lei), Transvaalstraat, and Waterloostraat, has the highest number of townhouses. To the north, in the Antwerp section, many further examples were built along the streets surrounding Dageraadplaats.

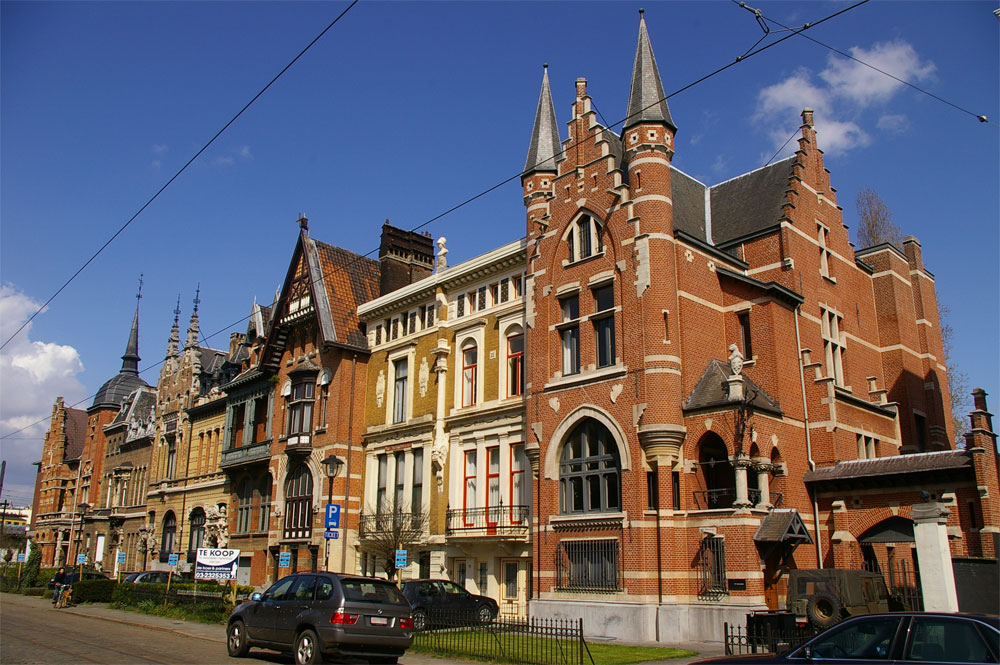
A group of houses along the Cogels-Osylei, with De Zevensterre (Cogels-Osylei, 17) in the foreground. This group, all designed by the architect Joseph Bascourt, reflects the diverse architectural trends that are found in Zurenborg.

=== Styles ===
The development of Zurenborg coincided with the peak of Art Nouveau popularity, and that movement had the greatest impact on the stylistic language of the area. However, many other styles—mostly "revival styles"—that were popular at the time are also represented. These include Gothic Revival, Neo-Renaissance, Greek Revival, Neoclassical, and the "cottage style" that coincided with British Tudorbethan architecture.

=== Themes ===
The houses were often named and decorated with accompanying themes. The influence of organic and natural sources is particularly evident in the themes and names of the Art Nouveau homes: The Sunflower, The Rose, The Tulip, etc. Houses also referenced local history or the names of the streets upon which they stand. The Lion of Flanders prominently adorns Cogels-Osylei 2–4, while across the street an entire complex is devoted to Charlemagne. Some street names refer to the independence war of linguistic affinity, the Boer war in South Africa: Pretoriastraat, Transvaalstraat and Krugerstraat. On Waterloostraat houses recall the eponymous battle. One of them, Waterloostraat 30, is adorned with a silhouette of Napoleon in his characteristic headgear, while another is decorated with glazed ceramic panels depicting scenes from that battle. The façade of no. 11, The Battle of Waterloo, shows the portraits of Wellington and Napoleon, the two great commanders of the age. Bayonets, flags, smoking cannons and drums show you clearly the subject of the house.

=== Co-ordination of houses ===
Groups of individual houses were sometimes combined to form a general theme and are intended to be experienced as co-ordinated designs rather than as individual units. The five adjoining houses collectively known as De Tijd (Time) on Waterloostraat make up such an ensemble. Each one, built in brick and in contrasting colours, is named for, and thematically represents, a time of the day: Ochtend (Morning), Dag (Day), Avond (Evening) and Nacht (Night). Similarly, some of the structures "speak" to one another. Examples of such a grouping are on the four corners of the Waterloostraat and Generaal Merlenstraat intersection, where houses depicting the four seasons face one another: Lente (Spring), Zomer (Summer), Herfst (Autumn) and Winter.

=== Architects ===
Several architects worked in the neighbourhood. Among them was Joseph Bascourt, who designed 25 of the houses, Jules Hofman, and Frans Smet-Verhas.

== Post World War II history ==
With car ownership rising and upper middle class households moving to the suburbs, the status of Zurenborg - especially Cogels Osylei - as a well-to-do residential area came down. The houses were regarded as too big and too energy consuming. A major plan was made in the 1960s to transform the whole area into a business and office area similar to the one built at Brussels North station. In the end, however, it was concluded that the area was not to be demolished. The area was listed as an item of urban landscape, to the disappointment of many owners who expected to sell their properties at a profit.

The area became popular with artists and entrepreneurs. Many houses became listed monuments. With the help of public subsidies, many owners succeeded in renovating their properties and Zurenborg became a well-functioning urban neighborhood with a variety of people. Dageraadplaats ("Dawn Square") in the northern part of Zurenborg was transformed from a neighbourhood shopping area into one of the most popular dining areas in Antwerp, and the art nouveau mansions in Zurenborg draw high numbers of visitors and tourists.

== Gallery ==
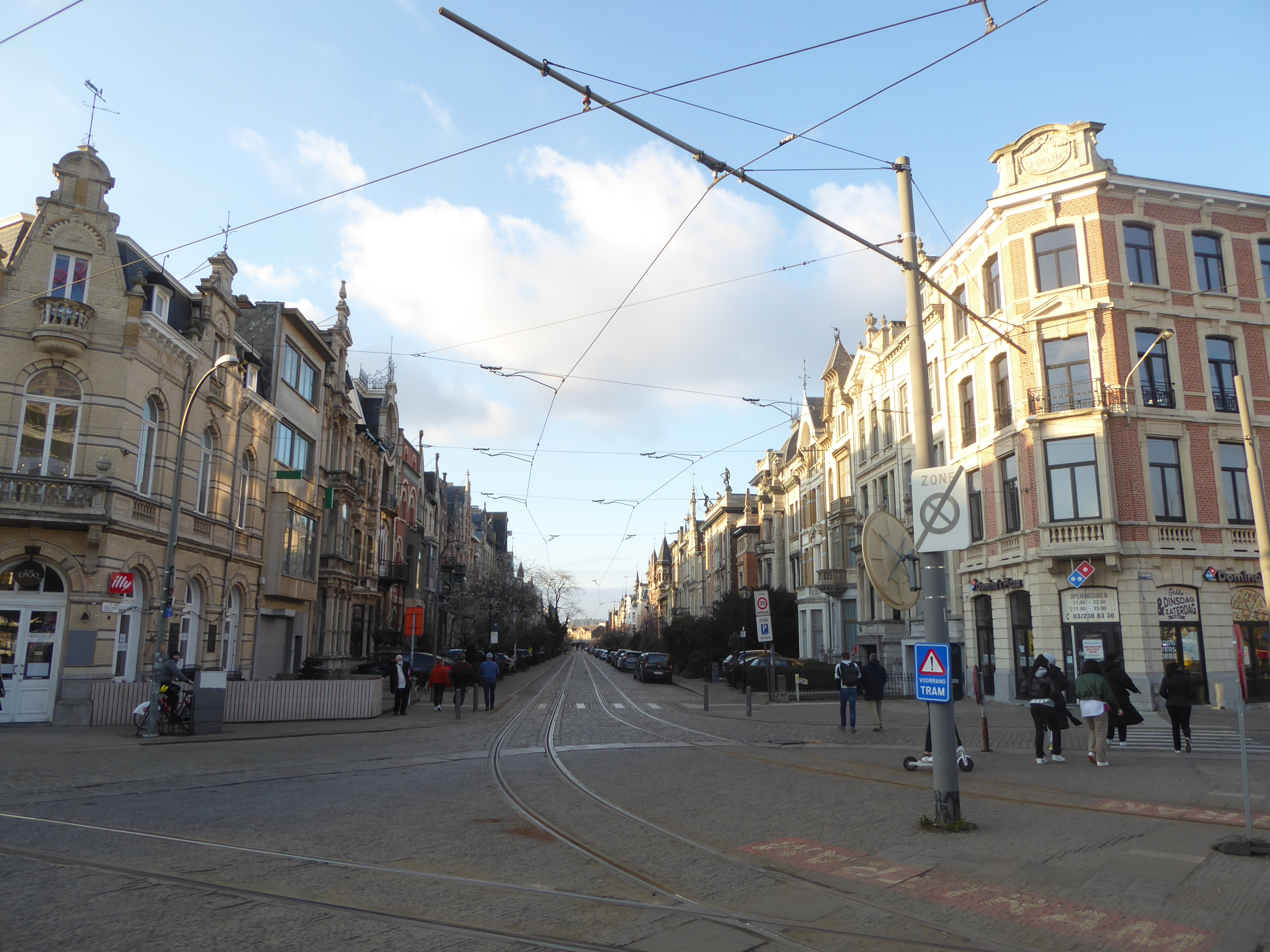
Cogels-Osylei, Zurenborg, Antwerp, from Burgemeester E. Reyckaertsplein

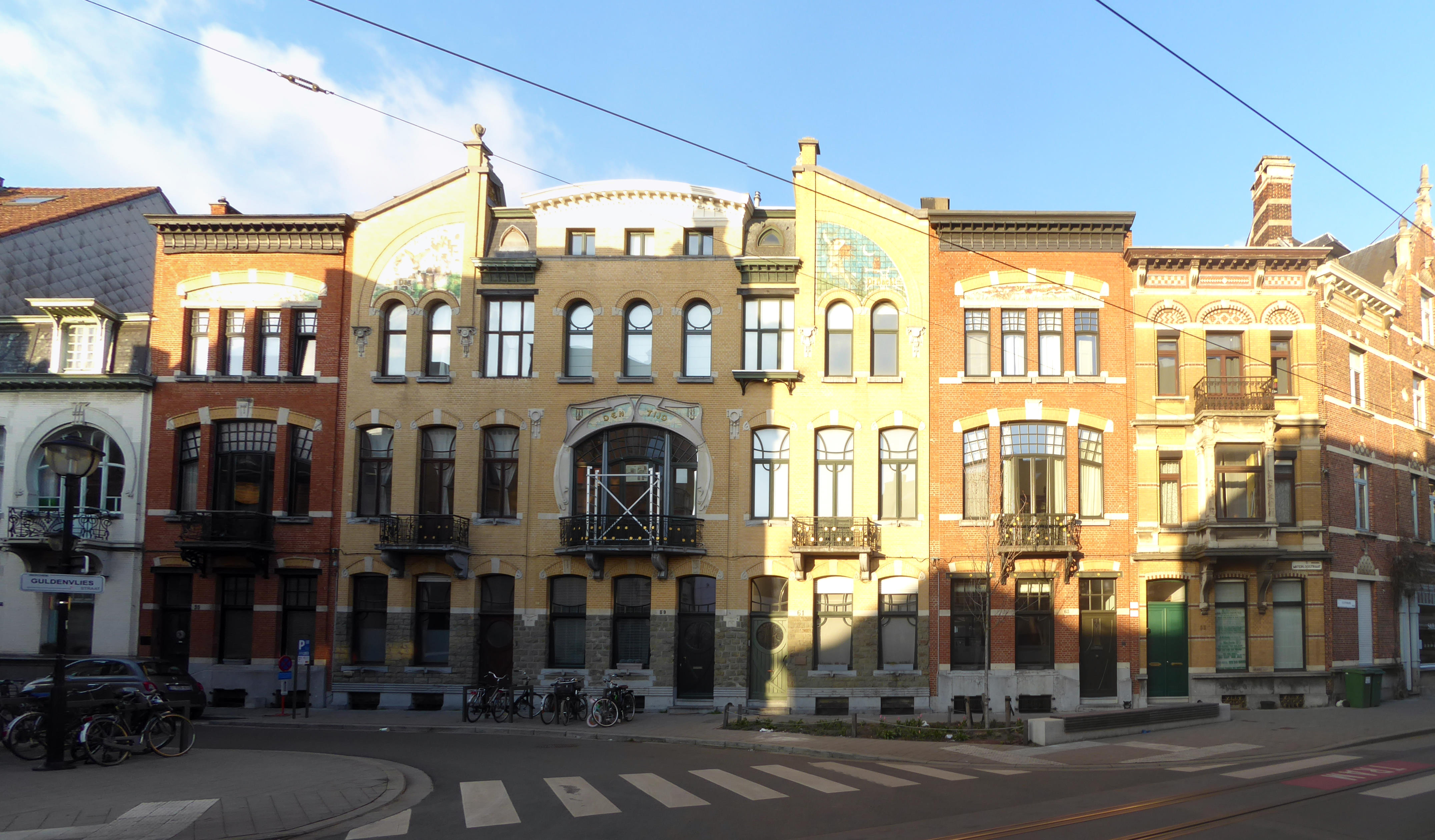
Ensemble De Morgend, Den Dag, Den Tijd, De Nacht en Den Avond, Waterloostraat 55-63, Zurenborg, Antwerp

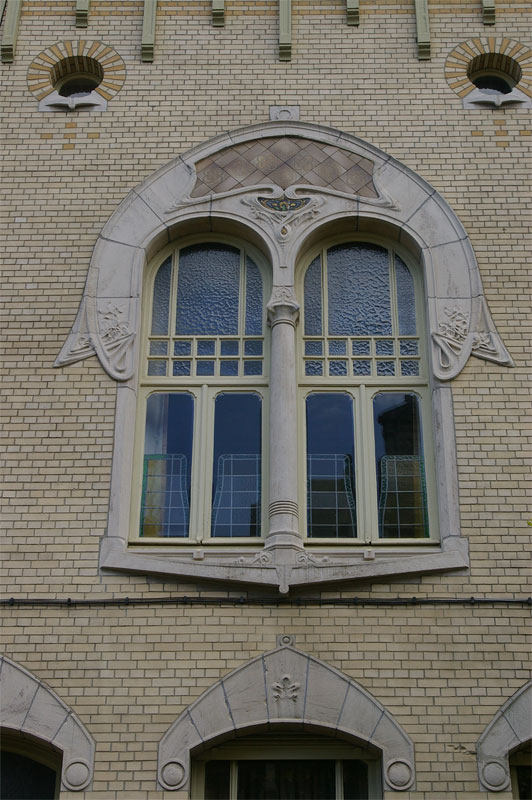
The Morning Star (detail), Cogels-Osylei 55. Architect: Joseph Bascourt

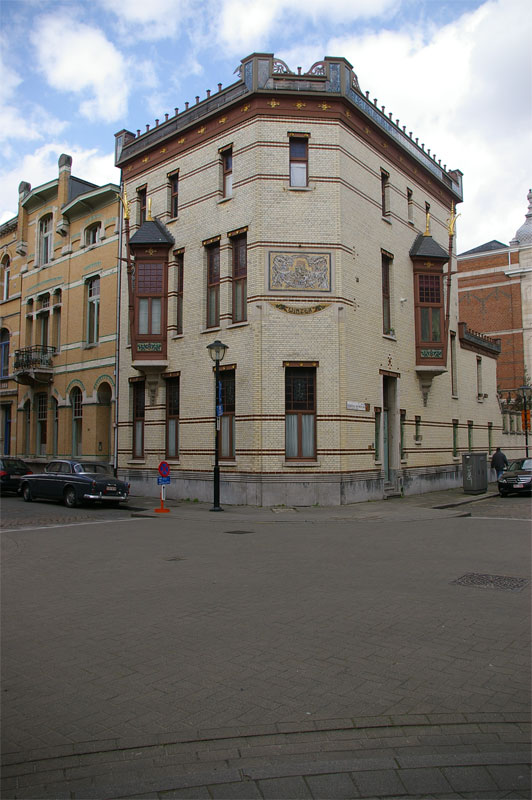
The 4 seasons (Winter), Generaal van Merlenstraat 27-30. Architect: Joseph Bascourt

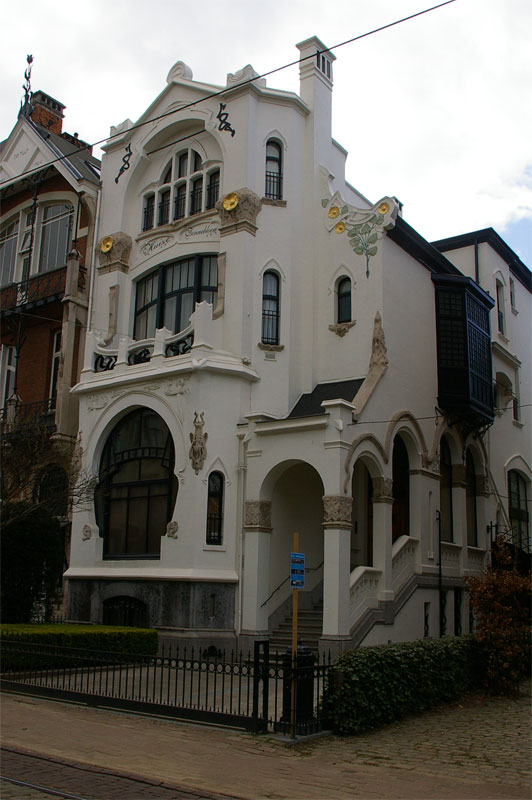
Zonnebloem (Sunflower), Cogels Osylei 50. Architect: Jules Hofman

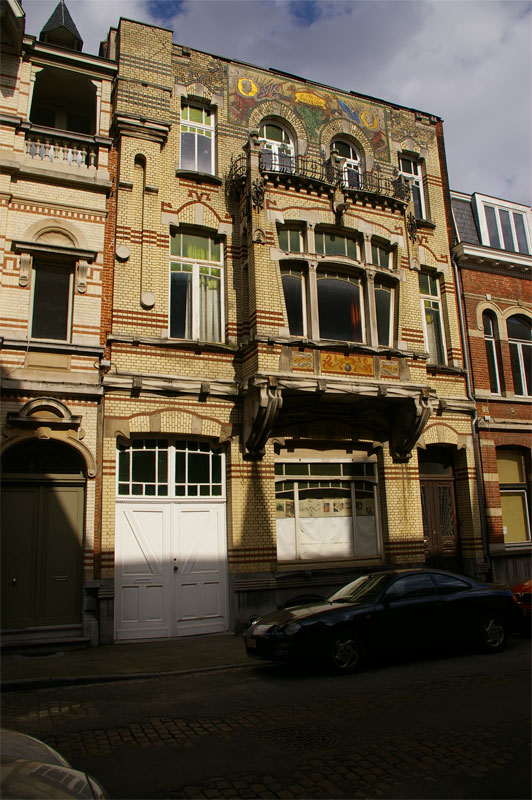
The Battle of Waterloo, Waterloostraat 11. Architect: Frans Smet-Verhas

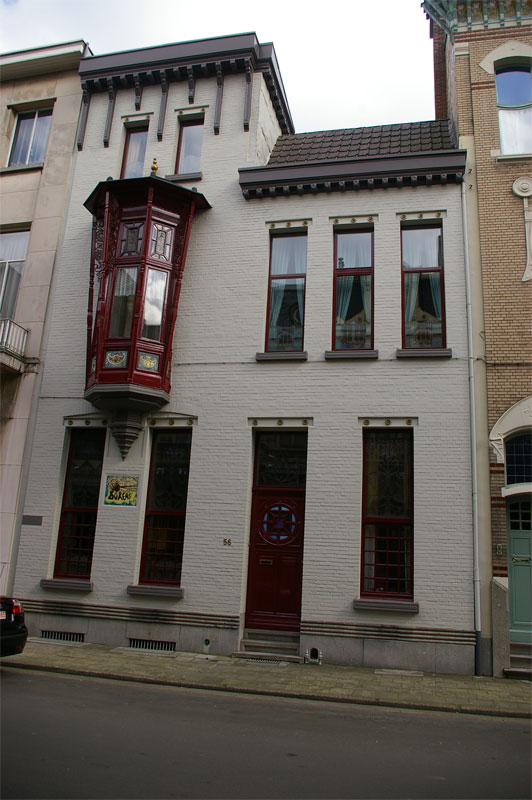
"Boreas" house, Transvaalstraat 56. Architect: Joseph Bascourt
