= Grote Markt, Antwerp =

Square in Antwerp, Belgium

Grote Markt
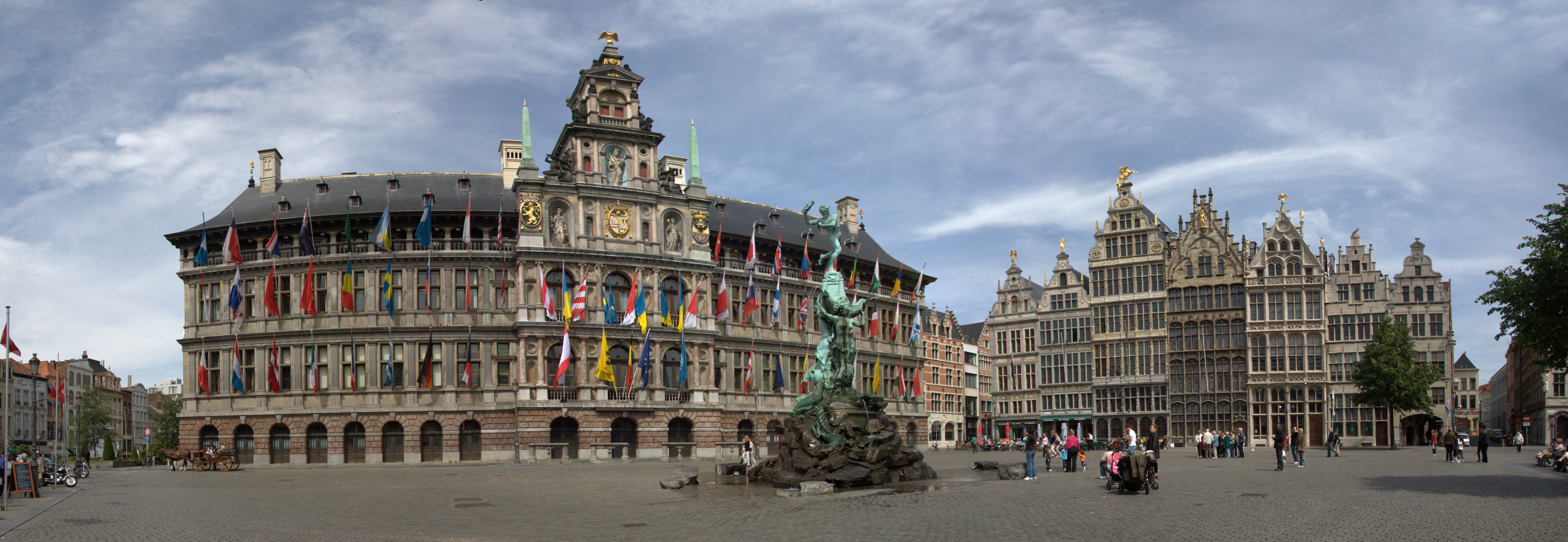
- Panorama of Antwerp's Grote Markt

- Location within Belgium
- Location: Antwerp, Belgium
- Coordinates: 51°13′16″N 04°23′59″E

The Grote Markt (Dutch: [ˌɣroːtə ˈmɑr(ə)kt]; "Big Market") is the central square of Antwerp, Belgium, situated in the heart of the old city quarter. It is surrounded by the city's Renaissance Town Hall, as well as numerous guildhalls with elaborate façades, the majority of which are reconstructions from the 19th and early 20th century, approximating paintings of the square by Flemish artists. A few of the guildhall façades, such as that of Sint-Joris's are intact originals entirely dating back to the 16th century.

The square also has many restaurants and cafés, and it lies within walking distance of the Scheldt river. The Grote Markt hosts a Christmas market and ice rink every winter.

== Attractions ==
The square's main attractions include:

- Antwerp's City Hall, built between 1561 and 1565 in Renaissance style, on the foundations of an older burned down city hall
- The guildhalls, especially the original 16th-century Guildhall of Sint-Joris at Grote Markt 7 and De Valk guildhall at Grote Markt 11
- The Brabo Fountain, created by Jef Lambeaux in 1887, depicting the local legend of Silvius Brabo and the giant Druon Antigoon
- Antwerp Jazz Club (AJC) in De Mouwe guildhall (alternative names: De gulde Mouwe or Het Cuypershuys)
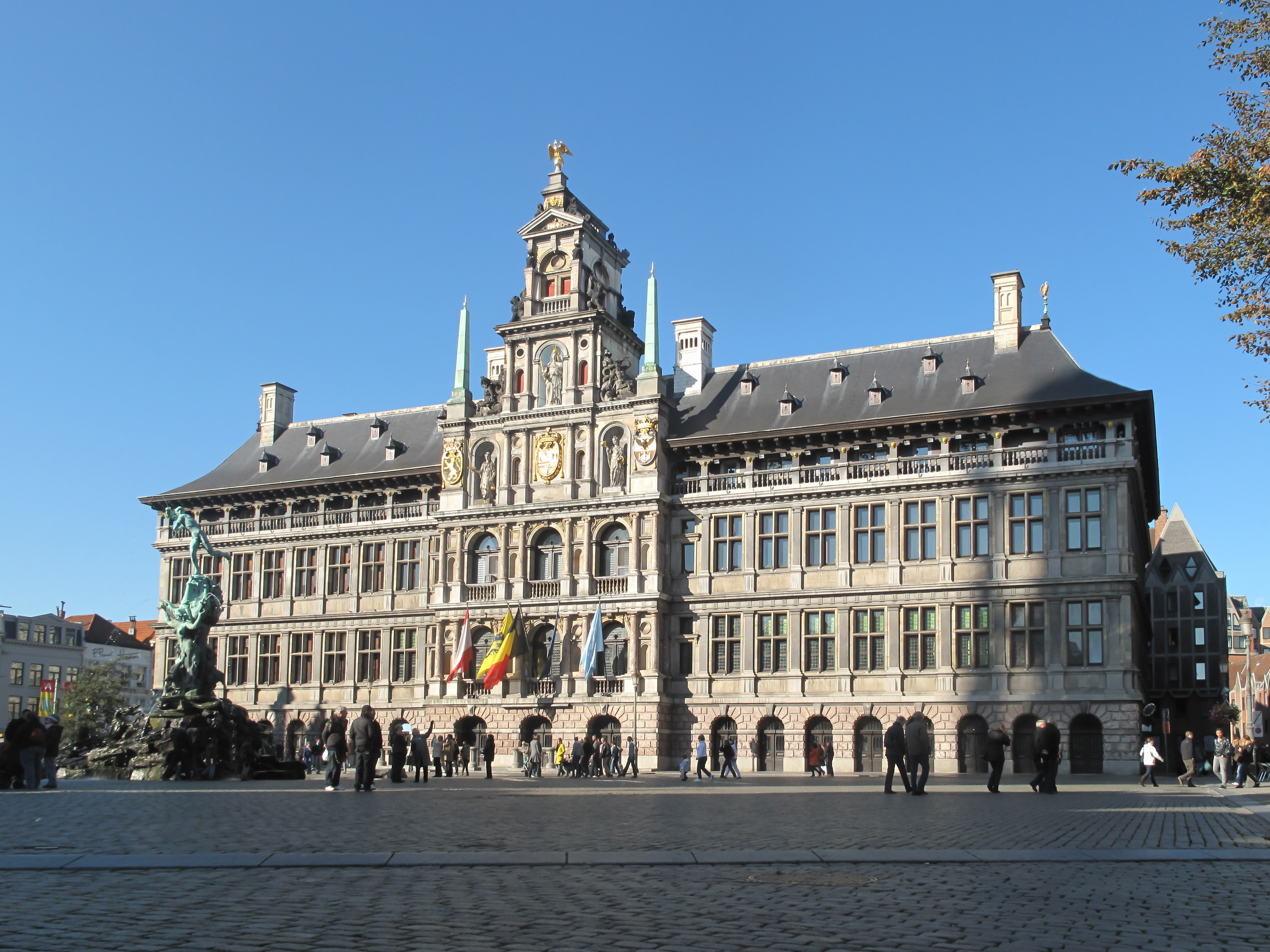
Antwerp City Hall with the Brabo Fountain

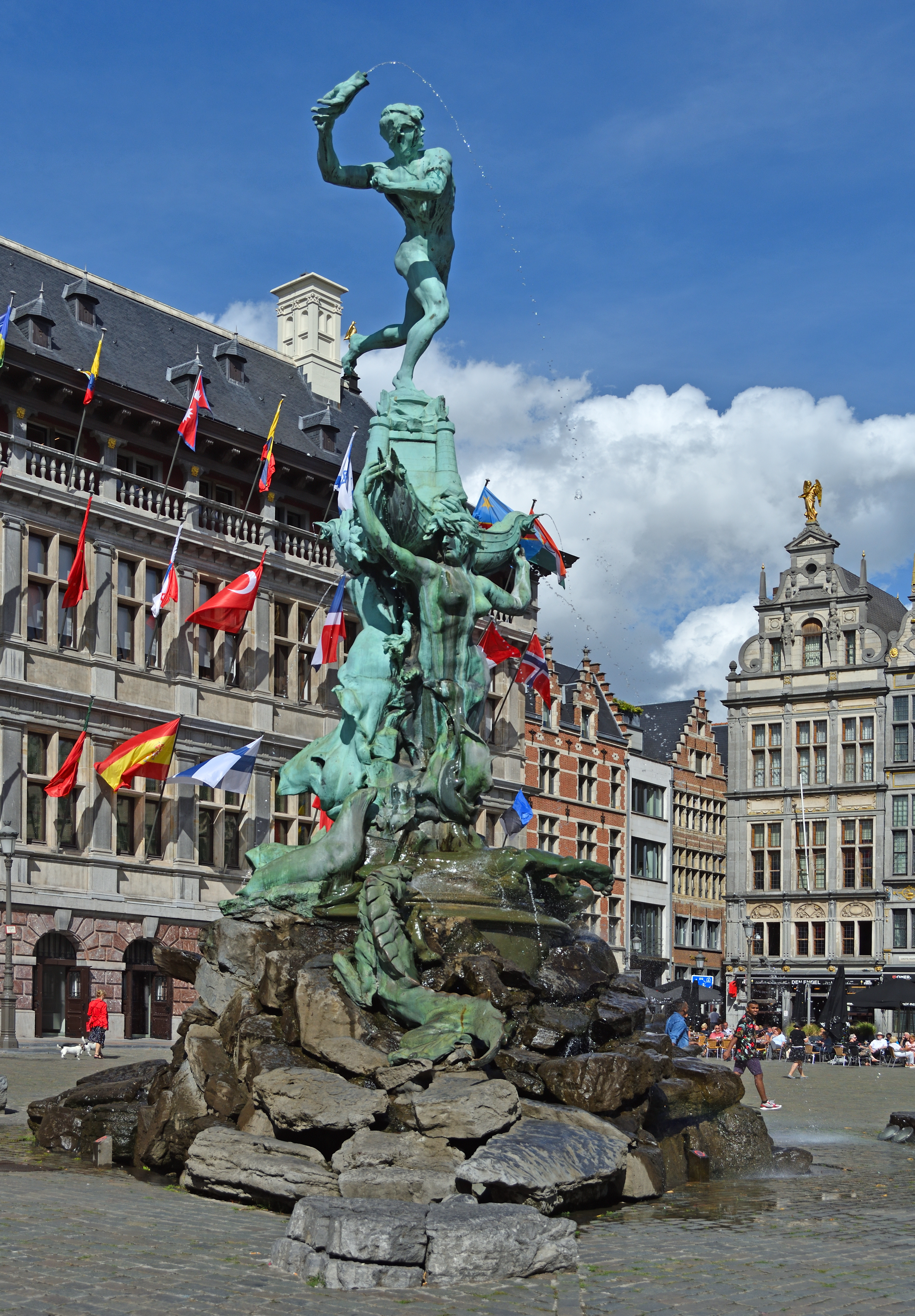
Close-up of the Brabo Fountain

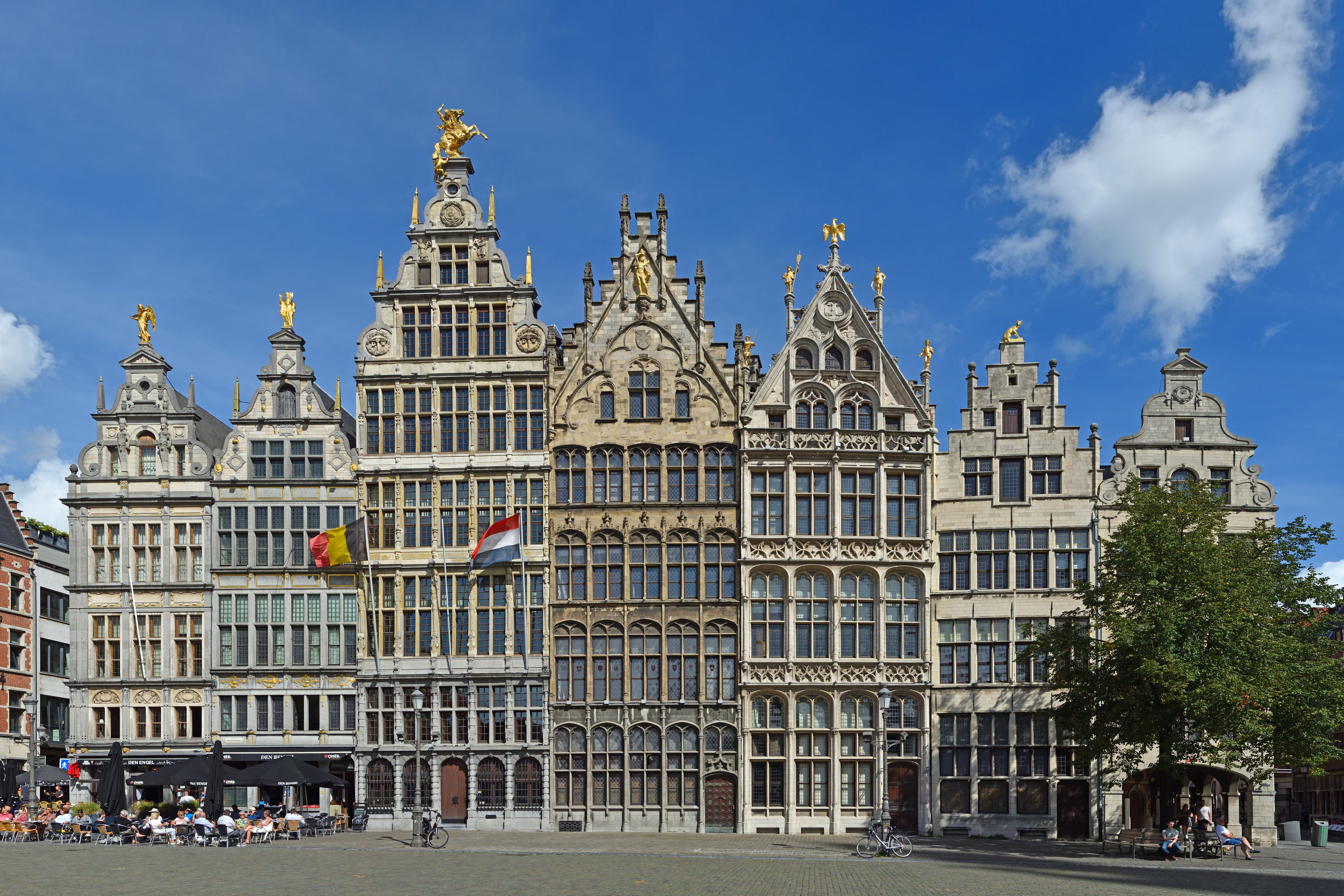
Guildhalls

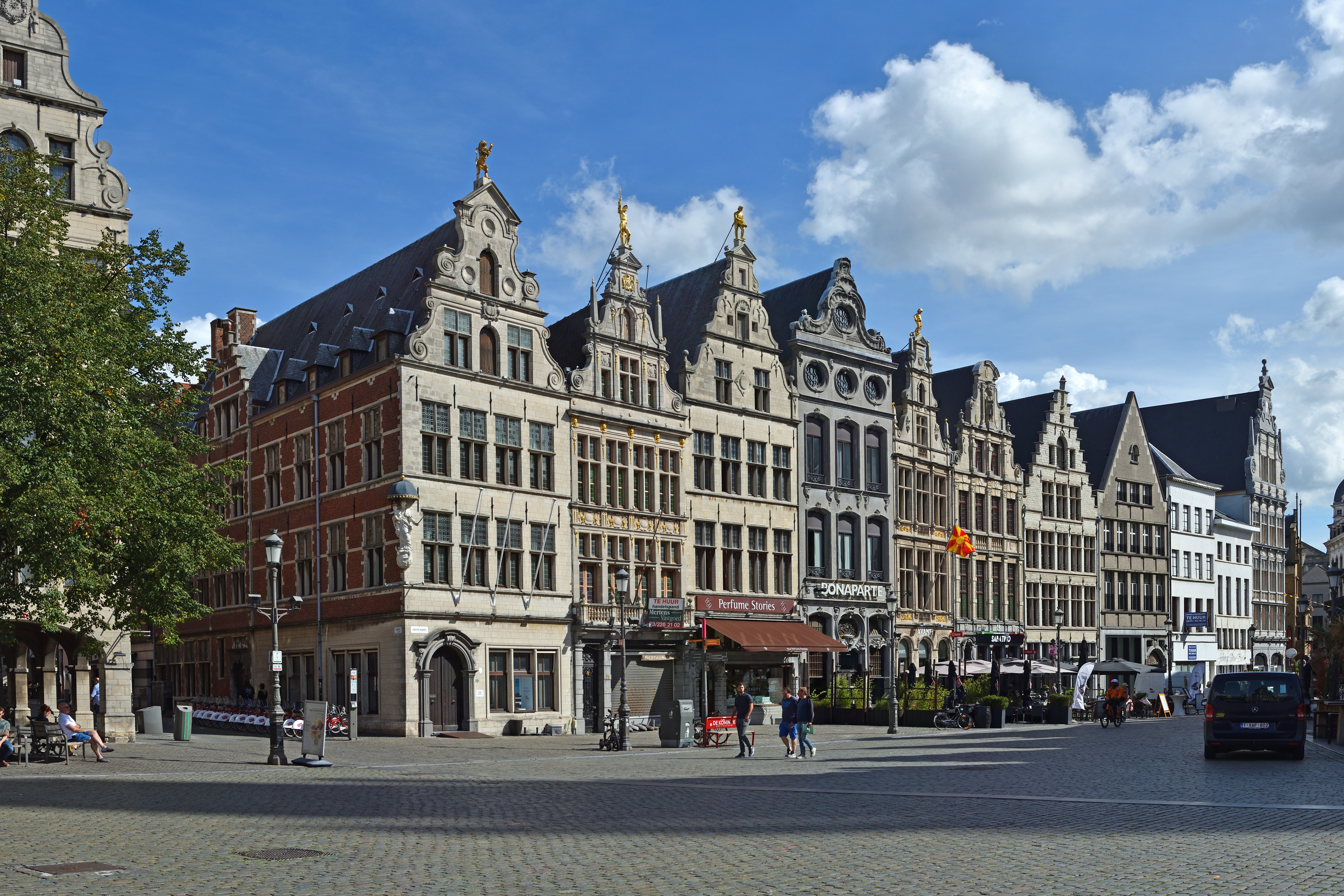
Monumental buildings
