= Brabo =

Brabo

- Bråbo, a hundred (former administrative division) in Sweden.
- Silvius Brabo, a Roman soldier in Belgian legend.
  - Brabo Fountain, a fountain at Antwerp named after him.
