= Antwerp hands =

Regional food

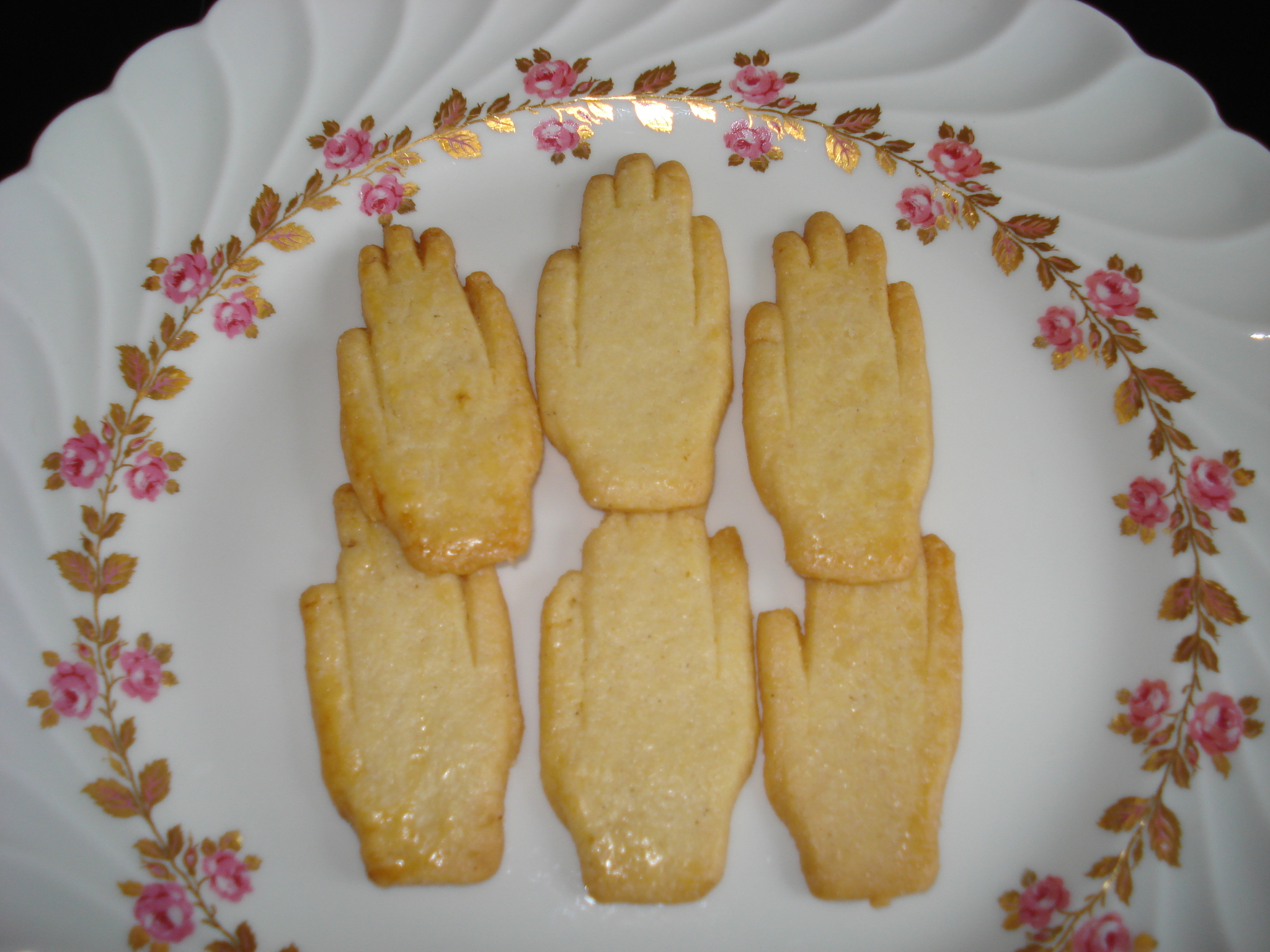
- Antwerp hands biscuits
- Alternative names: Antwerpse handjes
- Type: Biscuit; chocolate
- Place of origin: Belgium
- Region or state: Antwerp
- Created by: Jos Hakker
- Invented: 1934
- Main ingredients: Butter, sugar, eggs, flour, almonds
- Variations: Chocolate versions (with marzipan, praline, or Elixir d'Anvers)

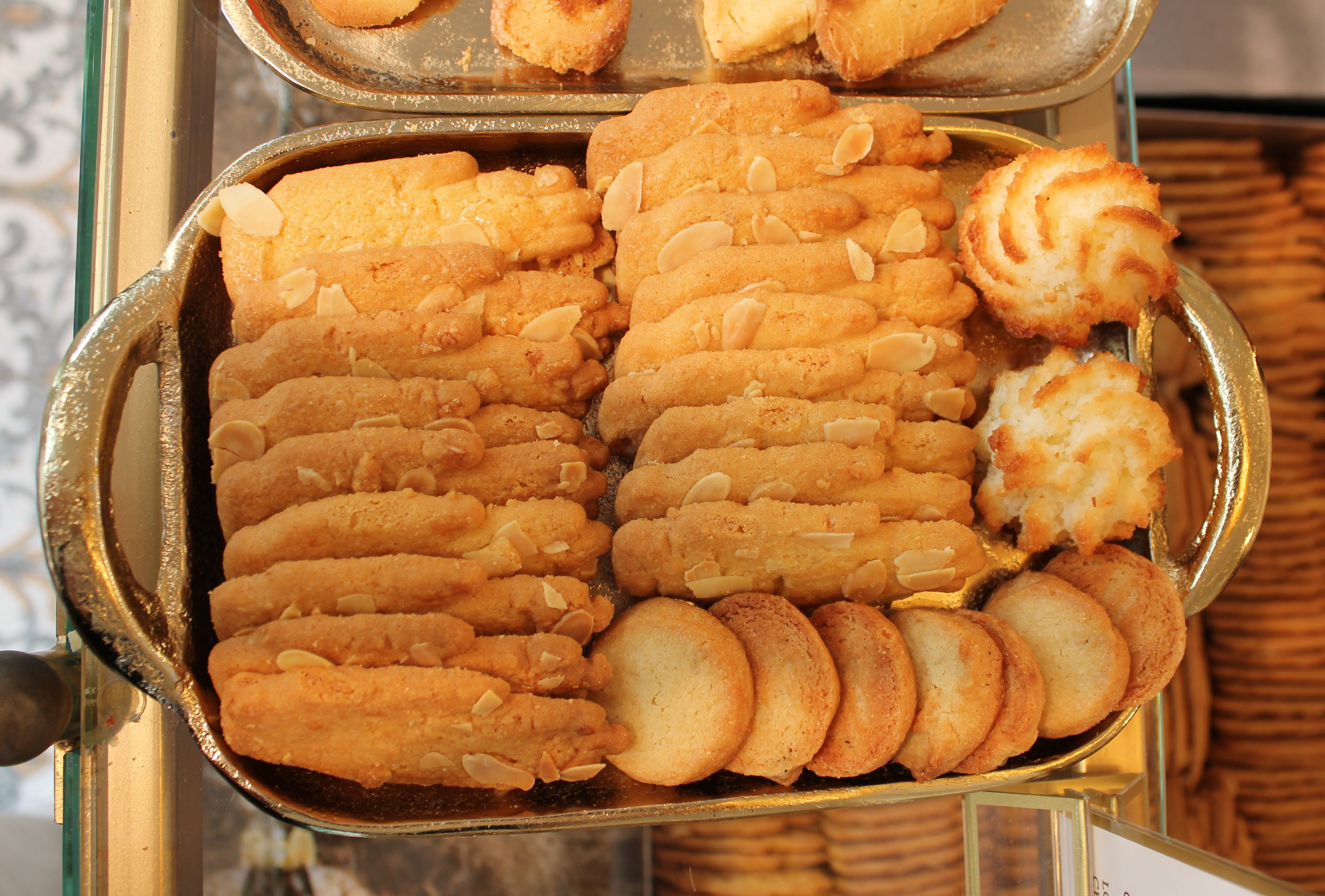
Scale with Antwerp hands

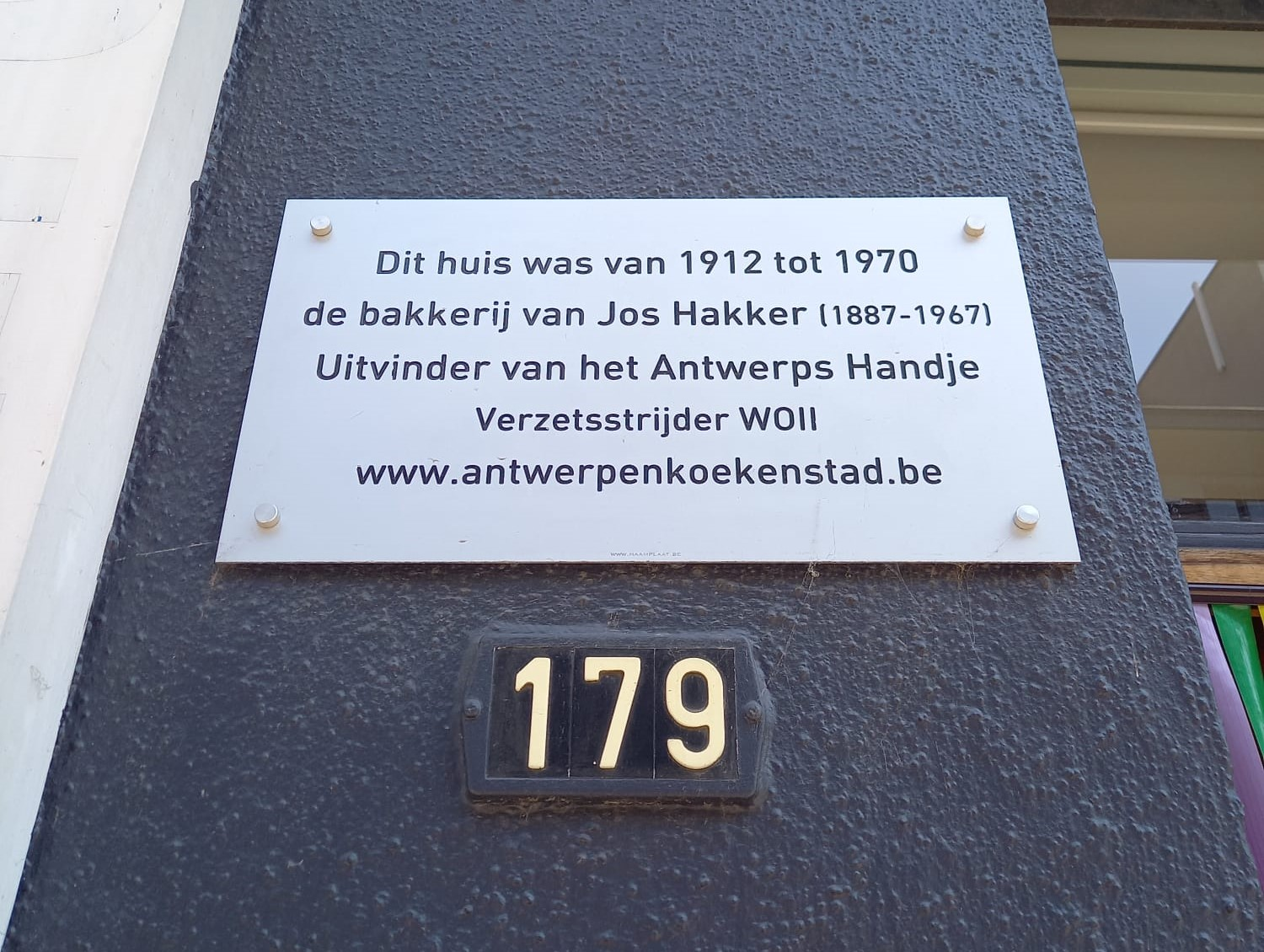
The building where Jos Hakker's bakery was located in Provinciestraat, Antwerp.

Antwerp hands are a traditional regional delicacy from Antwerp, crafted in the shape of a hand. The name is a reference to the supposed folkloric origin of the city's name, Antwerpen. The story features a giant named Druon Antigoon, who guards a bridge crossing the river Scheldt, demanding a high toll and severing the hands of those who refuse. A Roman soldier named Brabo went on to defeat the giant by cutting one of his hands off and casting it into the river. The word Hand (Dutch: hand) and throwing (Dutch: werp) combine into Antwerp. The city of Antwerpen is supposed to have been named this in honour of this act, as the river cuts through it now. Therefore, the hands are not only a reference to the giant's severed hand, but also to one of the popular origin stories of the city.

The concept for these hand-shaped treats originated from a competition organized by the Royal Association of Master Pastry Chefs of Antwerp. In 1934, Jos Hakker, a Jewish pastry chef from Amsterdam, won the contest with his creation: a buttery, almond-flaked biscuit in the form of a hand, made from butter, sugar, eggs, flour, and flaked almonds. The unique shape, ingredients, and packaging of these biscuits are now protected by a patent owned by the Syndicale Unie voor Brood-, Pastry, Chocolate and Ice Cream Industry VZW.

Beyond biscuits, there are also chocolate versions of Antwerp hands. Initially crafted without filling by chocolatier Goossens, since 1982, these chocolates have evolved to include variants filled with marzipan and Elixir d'Anvers, as well as praline-filled versions.
