= Antwerp Jazz Club =

Jazz club in Antwerp, Belgium

- Antwerpse Jazzclub
- The logo of the Antwerp Jazz Club, as retrieved in 2016. The logo depicts the abbreviation of the club (AJC), while a saxophone takes on the shape of the middle letter "J".

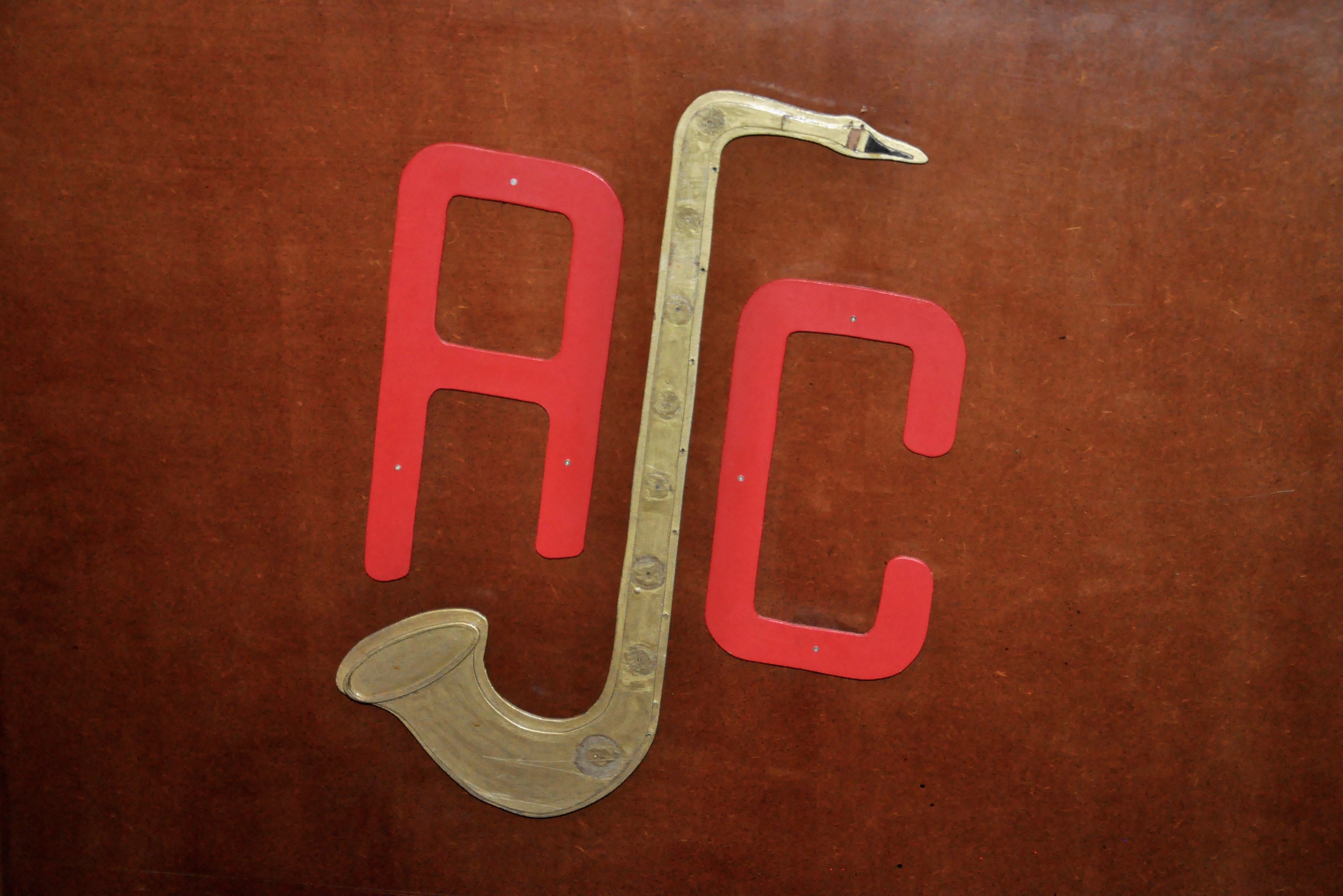
- A sculpture resembling the logo of the Antwerp Jazz Club, attached to the front of the foldable wooden screen covering the presenter's area, present during the jazz club's Tuesday-evening sessions in its clubhouse (13 September 2016).
- Named after: The city of Antwerp
- Formation: 1938; 88 years ago, making it one of the oldest still existing jazz clubs.
- Founder: Hans Philippi
- Purpose: "The study and propaganda of the jazz-music, as it was created and played by the Afro-Americans of the United States, by means of the exemplified listening of music- and image recordings, through lectures at third parties about the nature and movements of jazz and, if feasible the organizing of concerts with American jazz musicians."
- Headquarters: Second floor of Café Den Bengel, Grote Markt 5, 2000 Antwerp, Belgium. (Clubhouse)
- Location: Marc Vanistendael, August Van de Wielelei 305, bus 8, 2100 Deurne, Belgium. (Secretary)
- Coordinates: Clubhouse: 51°13′17.8″N 4°23′58.9″E; Secretary: 51°13′10.7″N 4°28′50.9″E
- Region served: Flanders, Belgium
- Key people: Marc Vanistendael; Josée Lissens; and; Language professor Piet Van De Craen
- Website: Currently: AntwerpseJazzClub.be (in Dutch); Previously (archived): AntwerpseJazzClub.com (in Dutch)

The Antwerp Jazz Club (Dutch: Antwerpse Jazzclub, abbreviated AJC) is an association in Antwerp, Belgium, founded in 1938 by Hans Philippi, which delivers weekly lectures about and presentations of jazz music, at no cost, open to the public at large. Its sessions are held in Dutch. Other than these sessions, the club organizes concerts, including helping to organize blues concerts; and has aided in the screenings of jazz documentaries.

Its Tuesday-sessions are held mostly by a member, and if not by another amateur of jazz, and are often illustrated by DVD-recordings. They are held every Tuesday night from 20PM until 22PM, but not during the Christmas period, nor the month of July. On request, the association also organises events about jazz for interested associations.

The jazz club is a member of:

- "De Stedelijke Culturele Raad van Antwerpen" (an advisory body which features civil participation in culture-related policy of the city of Antwerp);
- Hot Club de France; and
- Centre for Black Music Research, Chicago, United States.

The now obsolete Dutch-language website Gratisinantwerpen.be, which was supported by the city of Antwerp and listed free events in Antwerp (the website also had a less complete English version at Antwerpforfree.be), used to advertise the weekly Tuesday-sessions of the AJC.

AJC is a subscriber to a number of jazz magazines, from the United States and from several European countries, which can be consulted in its clubhouse.

== History ==
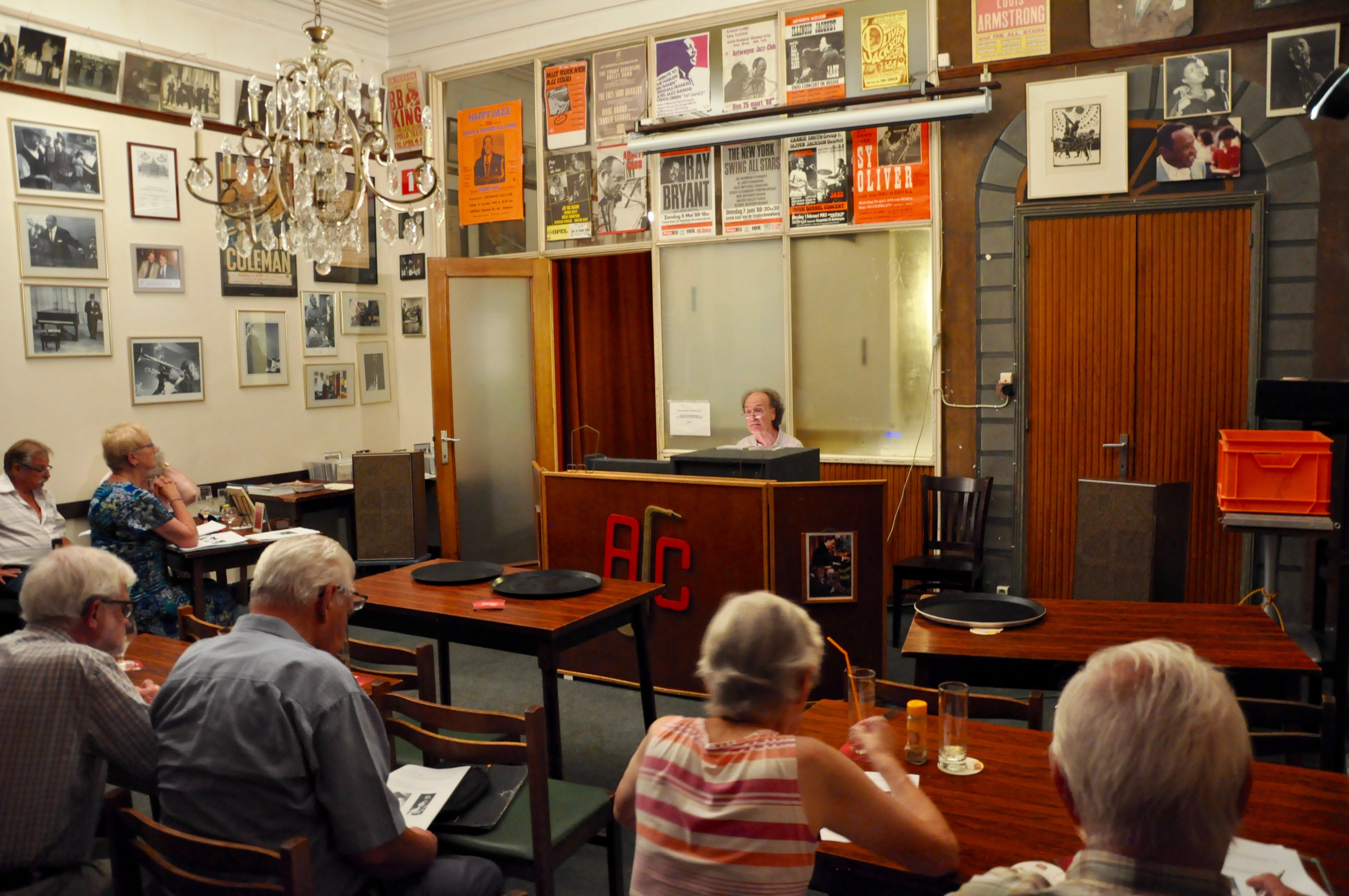
Guy Van Looy presenting his multimedia blues presentation entitled "Portraits in Blues 57: The SPIVEY RECORD LABEL" at the Antwerp Jazz Club (AJC) on 13 September 2016. Marc Vanistendael can be seen in the far left of the picture.

In 1938, the club started as gatherings to listen to commented jazz music, which remains the main activity of the club today (info as of 2016).

Since 1950, the club also started organizing concerts. Among the famous jazz musicians who have performed in Antwerp in the 1950s and 1960s, due to the AJC, are: Willie "The Lion" Smith, Big Bill Broonzy, Earl Hines, Memphis Slim, Buck Clayton, Bill Coleman, Buddy Tate, Ben Webster, Illinois Jacquet, Ray Bryant and Guy Lafitte.

On 28 April 1963 the AJC celebrated its silver jubilee.

The "Archive of Fons Van Cleempoel" (an archive spanning the years 1968—1988, created by "Amsab - Institute for Social History", in partnership with the "European Holocaust Research Infrastructure (EHRI)" and the "National Archives of Belgium") entails some documents from the AJC.

On the club's seventy-year jubilee, the club honoured its own history by means of showing its own concert recordings, lengthy documentation and imagery during its Tuesday-sessions.

On 18 August 2016, the Antwerp cinema "Cinema Zuid" (the new name of the Antwerp "Filmmuseum" since 12 September 2009, after it had moved to the Antwerp district "South" in 2004 under the Museum of Contemporary Art in Antwerp), in collaboration with the AJC, organized a screening of two documentaries about the Belgian jazz musician and conductor Stan Brenders and about the jazz guitarist Django Reinhardt respectively.

== Location ==
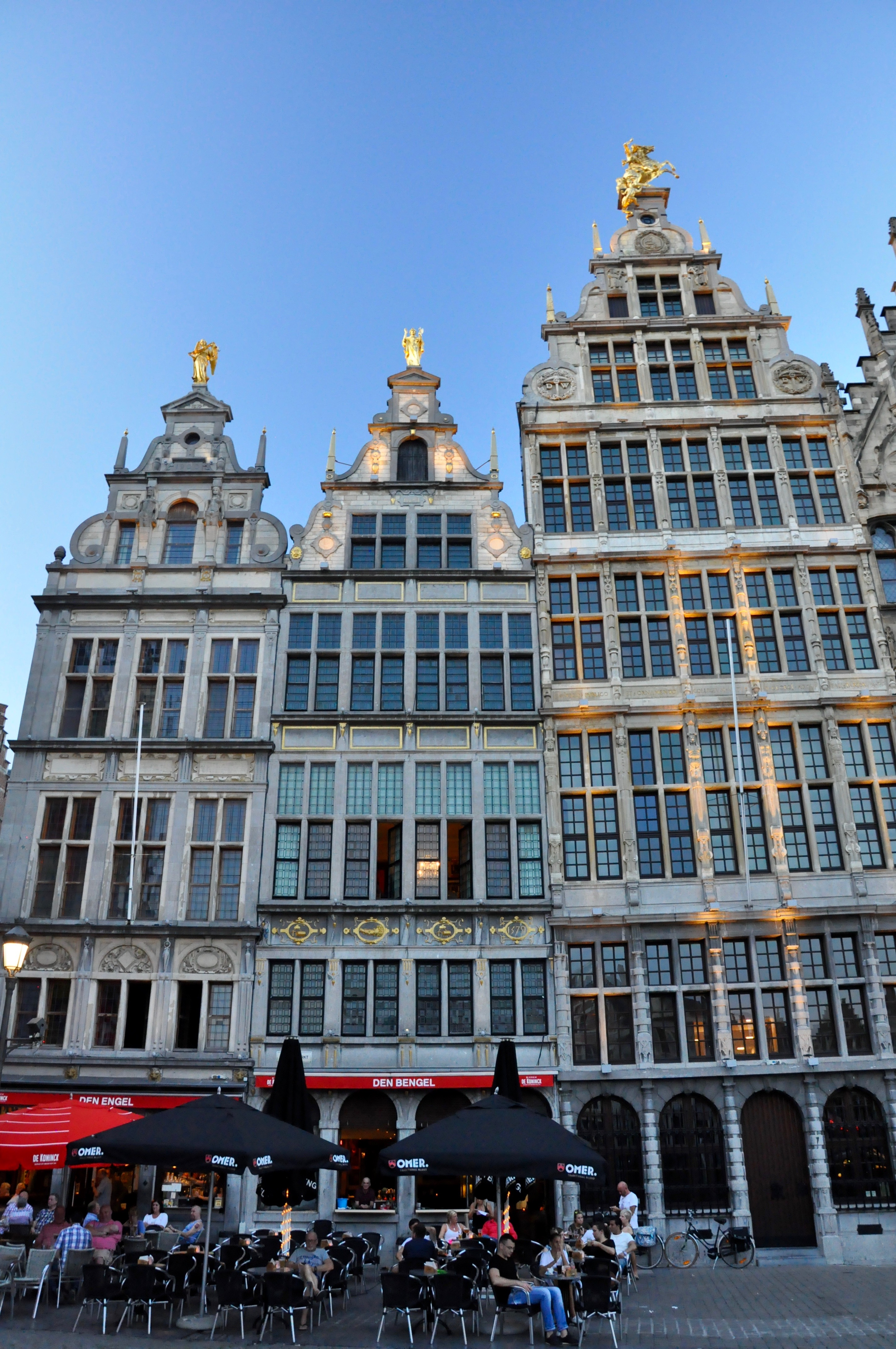
The clubhouse of AJC is located on the second floor (where windows can be seen opened) of the building in the centre (Ambachtshuis de Mouwe), a protected monument. Picture taken on 13 September 2016, fifteen minutes before the 8PM Tuesday-session of the jazz club.

Since 8 November 1994, AJC holds its sessions in a bar called "Den Bengel" in Antwerp.

More precisely, the clubhouse of AJC is housed in the same building as that bar (which occupies the ground floor), yet on the second floor. The building is actually an old guild house (Dutch: ambachtshuis) called "Ambachtshuis de Mouwe" (alternative names: "de gulde Mouwe" or "het Cuypershuys"), which is registered and protected as a monument since 2 September 1976 into the Flemish inventory of immovable property, part of the heritage registers in Belgium.

The building's ground floor is dated 1579, its gable is dated 1628. The building was originally the "house" of the craft of cooperage (Dutch: kamer van het Kuipersambacht). The architectural style of the building is renaissance architecture, it was designed by Léonard Blomme, and restored in 1907. The top of the building is crowned with a triangular pediment which holds a gilded statue of Saint Matthias, the patron saint of the coopers.

The building is part of the square Grote Markt. When facing its façade, one finds the building Burgerhuis Witten Engel (in Dutch) at its left and the building Huis Spaengien (in Dutch) at its right, which are also protected monuments.

== Notable persons ==
One of its board members is Piet Van De Craen, a full-time language professor of Dutch Linguistics and of General Linguistics at the Vrije Universiteit Brussel, who has been called a major force behind the jazz club. For the occasion of the seventy-year jubilee of the AJC in 2008, Piet Van De Craen published a monograph about Duke Ellington (the first ever publication about him in Dutch) which features a concise biography and discography, looks at Ellington as a pianist/composer and at Ellington's co-operation with Billy Strayhorn and "The Ellingtonians" before and after 1943. In the same year, Piet Van De Craen also criticized the lack of references to jazz history in the United States:

The United States doesn't learn anything from the history. Everytime there is a new president, one starts all over again. It is a country where connections are not made. And then it happens that, for example with Oscar Peterson, recently died, the press doesn't make any reference to Art Tatum, just as if Peterson arose out of nowhere ... that kind of profundity is lacking.

=== Presidents ===
==== Hans Philippi ====
Hans Philippi (born 17 December 1905) founded both the AJC, as well as the Hot Club Basel, a jazz club in Basel, Switzerland. He was an early advocate of the recognition of jazz as an art. He had his own radio series, held jazz music presentations by means of playing sound records throughout Switzerland and was acquainted with jazz musicians such as Louis Armstrong and jazz experts such as Hugues Panassié and Charles Delaunay.

The Swiss jazz musician Mario Schneeberger compiled a list of notable documents regarding Hans Philippi, from the memorial albums of Philippi, after an acquaintance of Schneeberger had told him that they were about to be put up as garbage disposal following a house clearance in February 2004.

In this archive by Mario Schneeberger, it is noted that Hans Philippi was president of the AJC in 1938, as from a booklet of that year produced by the AJC called "Jazz-Leven".

==== Louis Vaes and François Vaes ====
The activities of the club were coordinated by Louis Vaes (1920—1998) from 1946 until 1998.

Later, his brother François Vaes (born 1939), nicknamed "Sus", became president of the club, until he died after a "short disease" on 9 August 2012. François Vaes advocated for youths to appreciate the roots of jazz, as opposed to being seemingly merely interested in new or trendy jazz music.

== See also ==
- Jazz in Belgium
