= Brabo Fountain =

Monumental fountain in Antwerp, Belgium

- Brabofontein (Dutch)
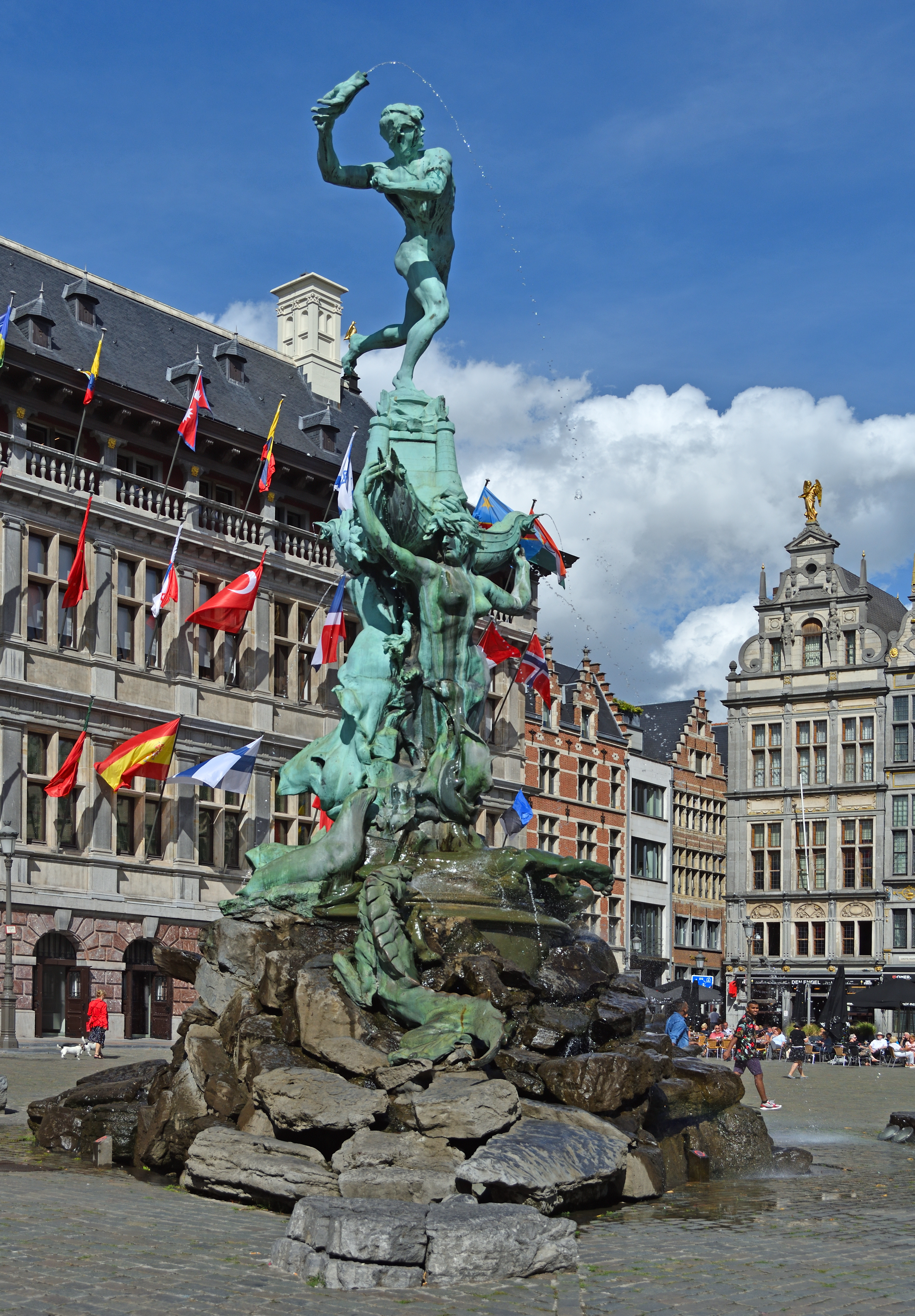
- Interactive map of Brabo Fountain
- Location: Grote Markt, Antwerp, Belgium
- Coordinates: 51°13′16″N 4°23′59″E
- Designer: Jef Lambeaux
- Type: Fountain
- Material: Stone and bronze
- Completion date: 1887

The Brabo Fountain (Dutch: Brabofontein) is an eclectic-style fountain-sculpture located in the Grote Markt (main square) of Antwerp, Belgium, in front of the City Hall. The fountain, dating from 1887, contains a bronze statue by the sculptor Jef Lambeaux depicting the city's legendary founder, Silvius Brabo, throwing the severed hand of the giant Druon Antigoon into the river Scheldt. It received protected status in 1982.

== History ==
The Brabo Fountain was erected in the centre of Antwerp's Grote Markt, on the site occupied until 1882 by a "Liberty tree", planted in 1836 to replace the first Belgian "Liberty tree" of 1831. The sculptor Jef Lambeaux realised the set of the bronze fountain. According to an inscription on the monument, Lambeaux owed the prestigious commission to Arthur Van den Nest, Alderman of Fine Arts of Antwerp from 1874 to 1882. The project was approved by the Antwerp city council on 31 March 1883, then replaced by municipal engineer Gustave Royers. The fountain was financed with the bequest of August Nottebohm, uncle of the local patron Oscar Nottebohm.

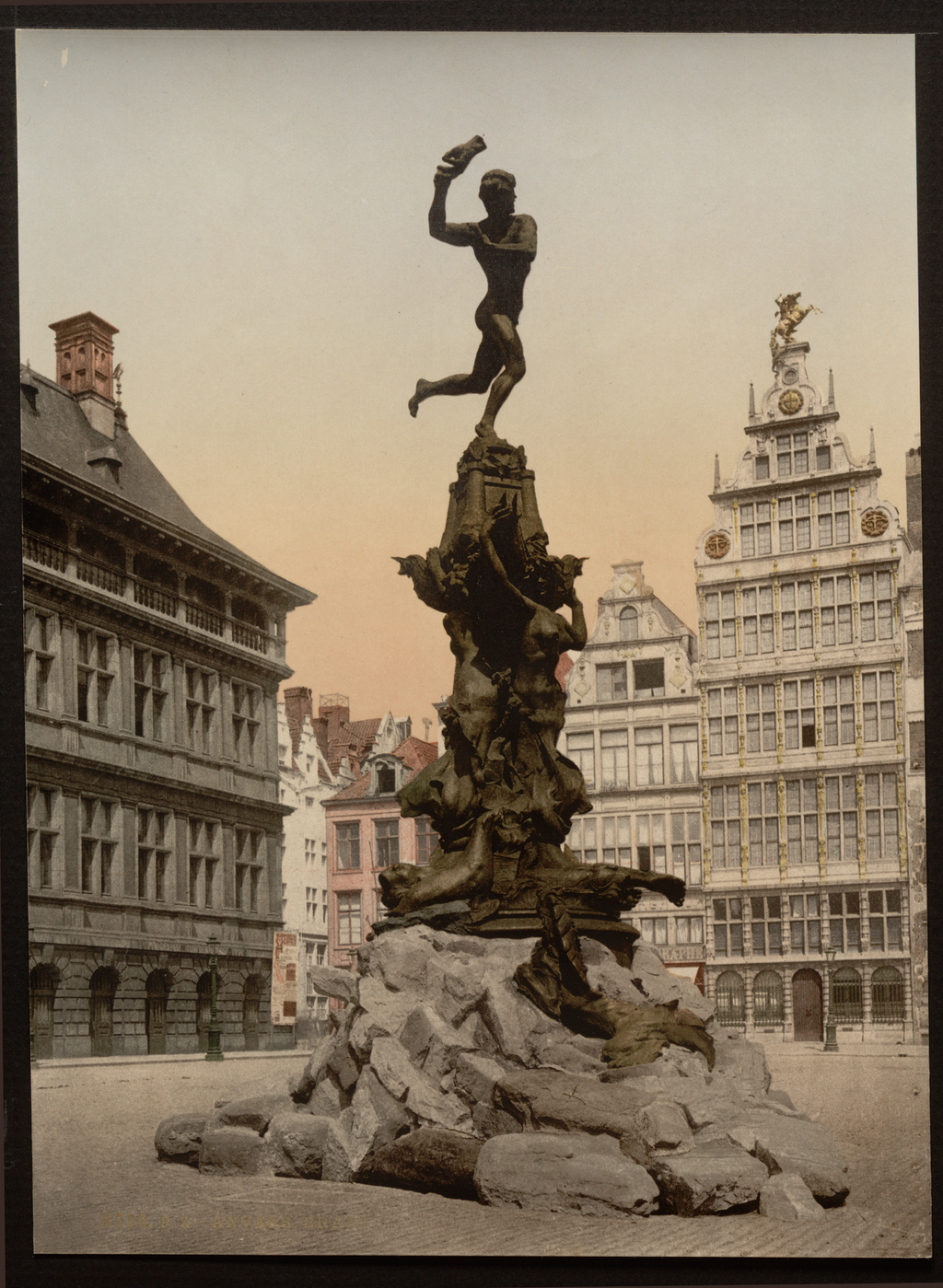
The Grote Markt with the Brabo Fountain in the late 19th century

In 1883, Lambeaux created a plaster model which was first presented to the press and then at the Ghent Salon. Given the enthusiasm generated, the city of Antwerp signed a contract with the artist in March 1884. In total, Lambeaux worked for almost three full years on the monument's construction. In November 1886, the execution of the fountain's sculptural group was entrusted to the Compagnie des Bronzes, based in Brussels. In January 1887, the foundry began casting the parts. Several plans preceded the execution, notably for the pedestal and the water basin initially planned, which was replaced by a rock formation in 1886. The municipal council voted for its location, on 21 June 1887, on the Grote Markt or the quays of the Scheldt, near the Suikerrui. The ceremonial inauguration finally took place on 21 August 1887.

The monument was restored in 1980. It was designated a protected monument on 27 October 1982.

== Subject ==
The composition recalls the legend of Silvius Brabo and the giant Druon Antigoon, which dates from the 15th century. The legend tells of a giant called Antigoon who was said to have lived near the Scheldt and extracted a toll from passing boatmen who moored in the area. He severed the hand of anyone who did not pay, and threw it in the river. Eventually, the giant was challenged and killed by a young captain of the Roman army named Brabo, who imitating what he had done, cut off the giant's own hand and flung it into the river. The fountain reflects the moment when Brabo throws the giant's hand into the river.

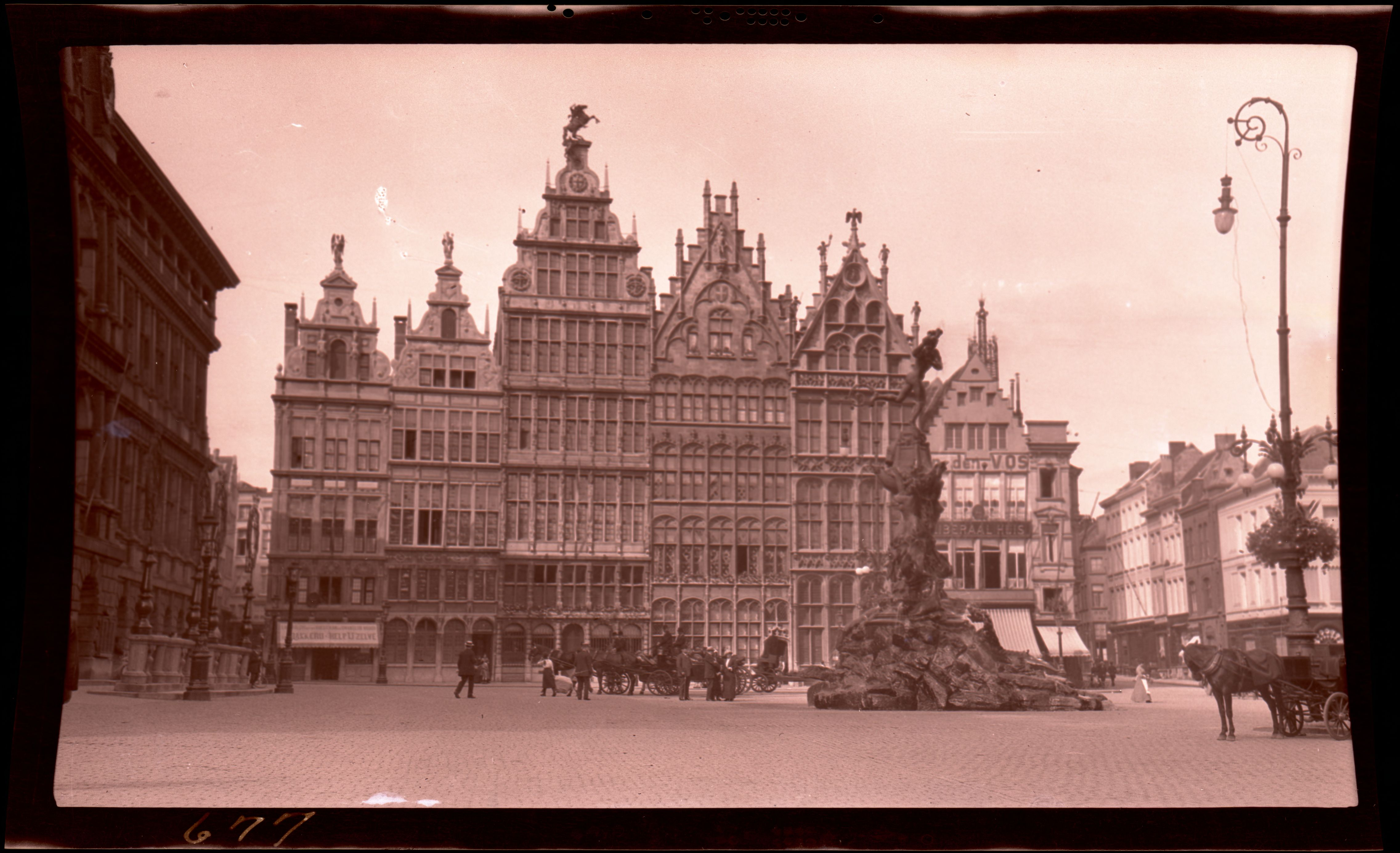
Photograph of the fountain taken in 1913

According to this legend, the etymology of the name Antwerpen is a composition of the Dutch words "(h)ant" (hand) and "werpen" (throw or launch). However, the American historian John Lothrop Motley argues, and so do a lot of Dutch etymologists and historians, that Antwerp's name derives from "anda" (at) and "werpum" (wharf) to give an 't werf (on the wharf, in the same meaning as the current English wharf). Aan 't werp (at the warp) is also possible. This "warp" (thrown ground) is a man-made hill or a river deposit, high enough to remain dry at high tide, whereupon a construction could be built that would remain dry. Another word for werp is pol (dyke) hence polders (the dry land behind a dyke, that was no longer flooded by the tide).

== Description ==
The fountain, 10.6 metres (35 ft) high, is signed and dated on the south side: "Jef LAMBEAUX/ 1887/ CIE DES BRONZES". On the west side, the pedestal bears the inscription: "VAN/ AUGUST NOTTEBOHMS ERFGIFT/ OPGERICHT 1887". The group of sculptures and its cylindrical pedestal rests on a base of stacked rough rocks. At his feet is the giant Druon Antigoon, decapitated and naked, surrounded by a turtle, a dragon, a sea lion and fish. Three voluptuous mermaids leaning against each other form the middle group. They carry a ship topped by a rock and a fortress with three towers, accentuated by raised hands. It is a representation of Antwerp's coat of arms, with the severed head of Antigoon on the north side. The castle serves as a base for Brabo, who, naked and standing on one leg, is about to throw the giant's hand away. For the dynamism of this figure, Lambeaux was inspired by Giambologna's Mercury.

The statue is positioned in such a way that Brabo seems to be throwing his hand towards the city. This is due to the limited distance between the City Hall and the statue: if one were to position Brabo in the direction of the Scheldt, it would seem that Brabo would want to lay hands on the City Hall.

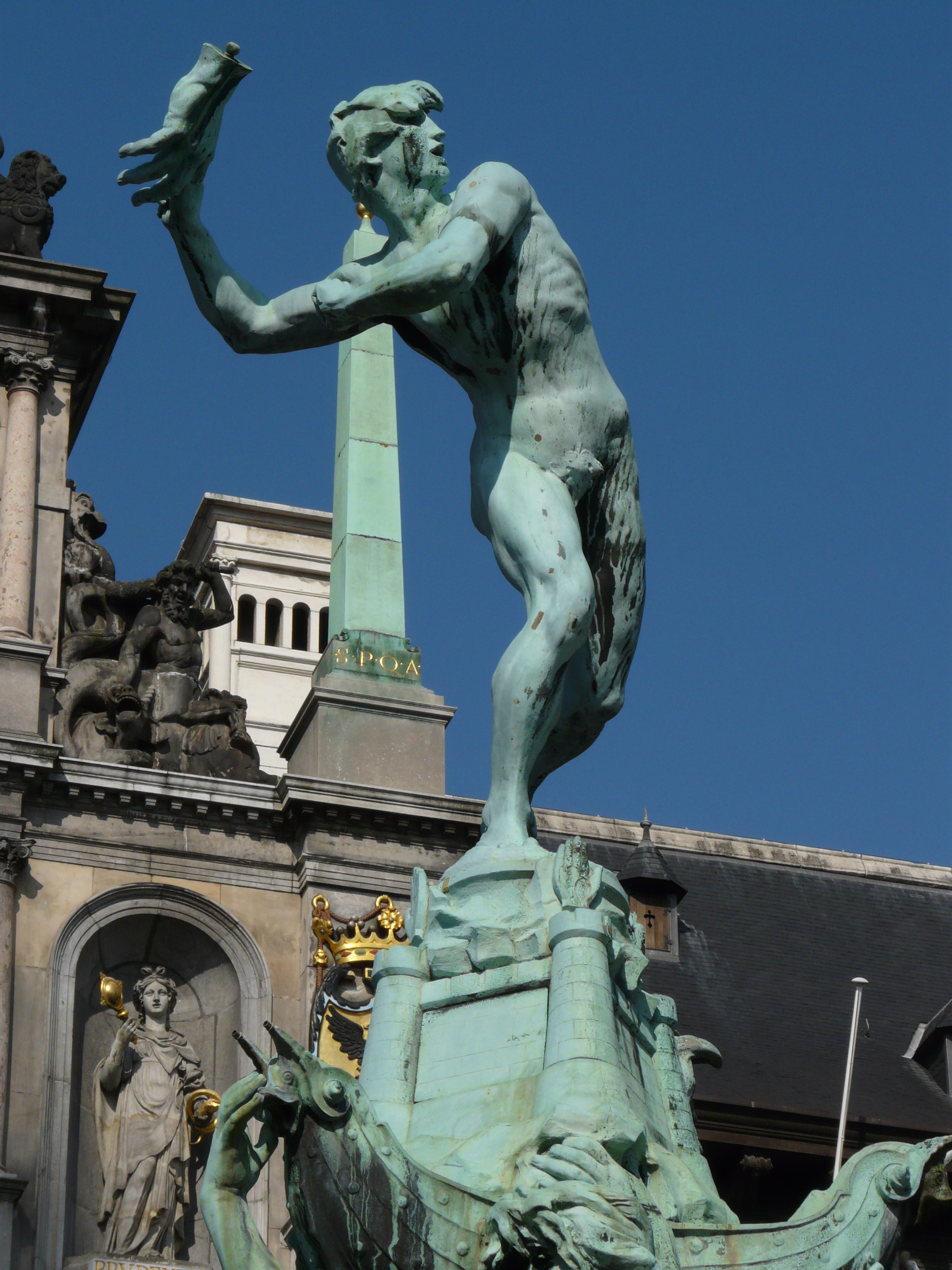
Silvius Brabo

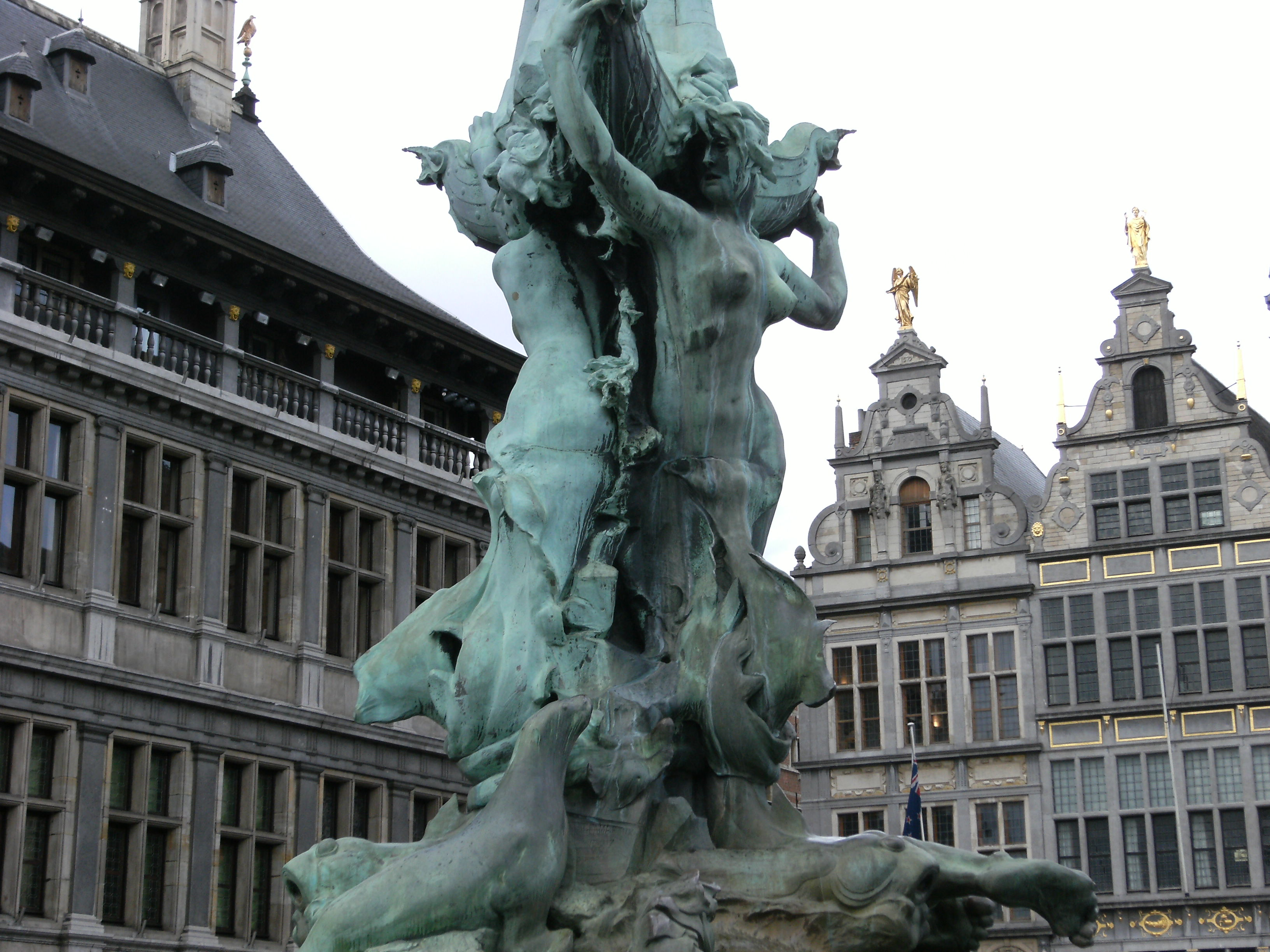
Mermaids

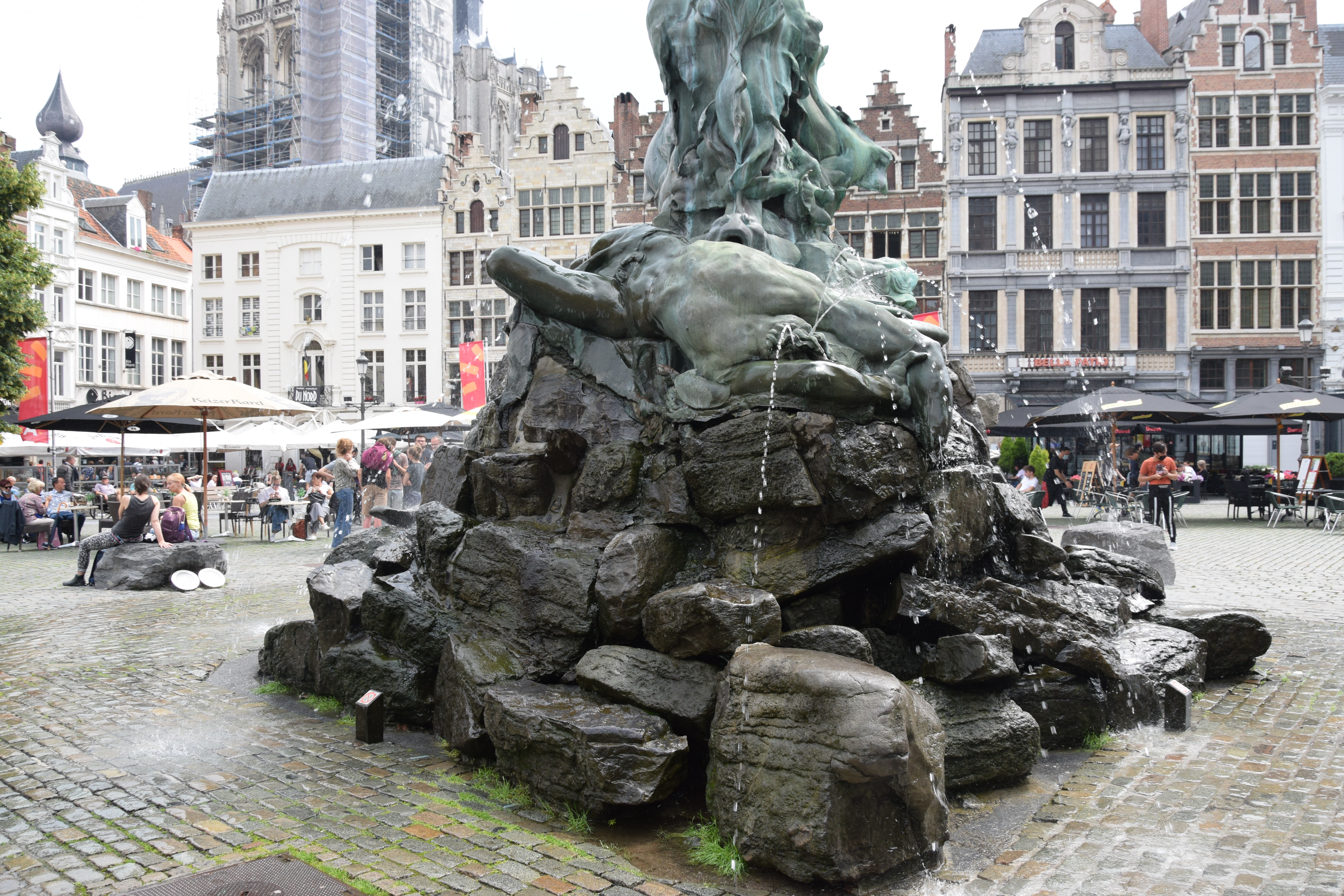
Druon Antigoon

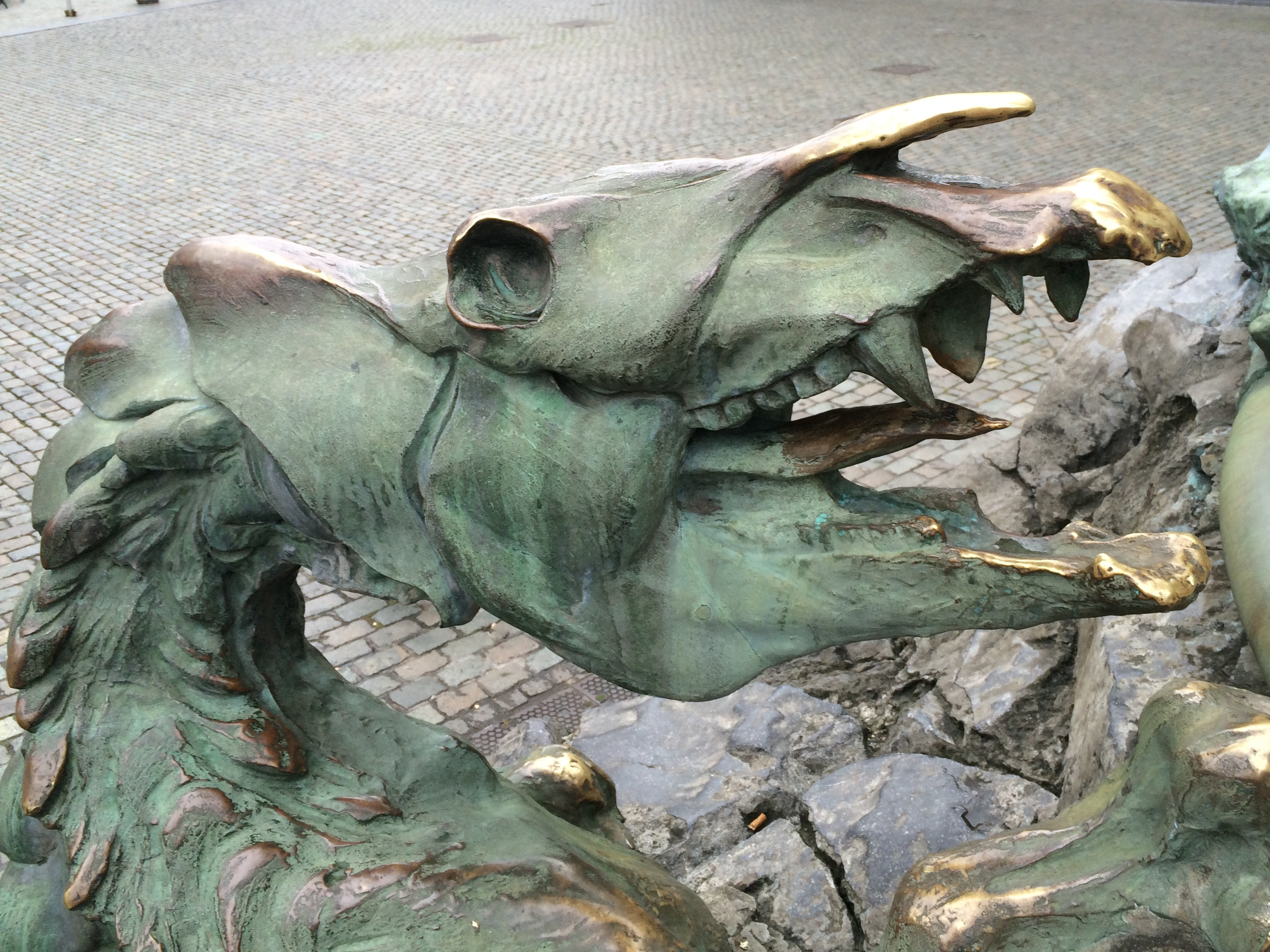
Dragon
