= Antwerp City Hall =

City hall of Antwerp, Belgium

- Stadhuis van Antwerpen (Dutch)
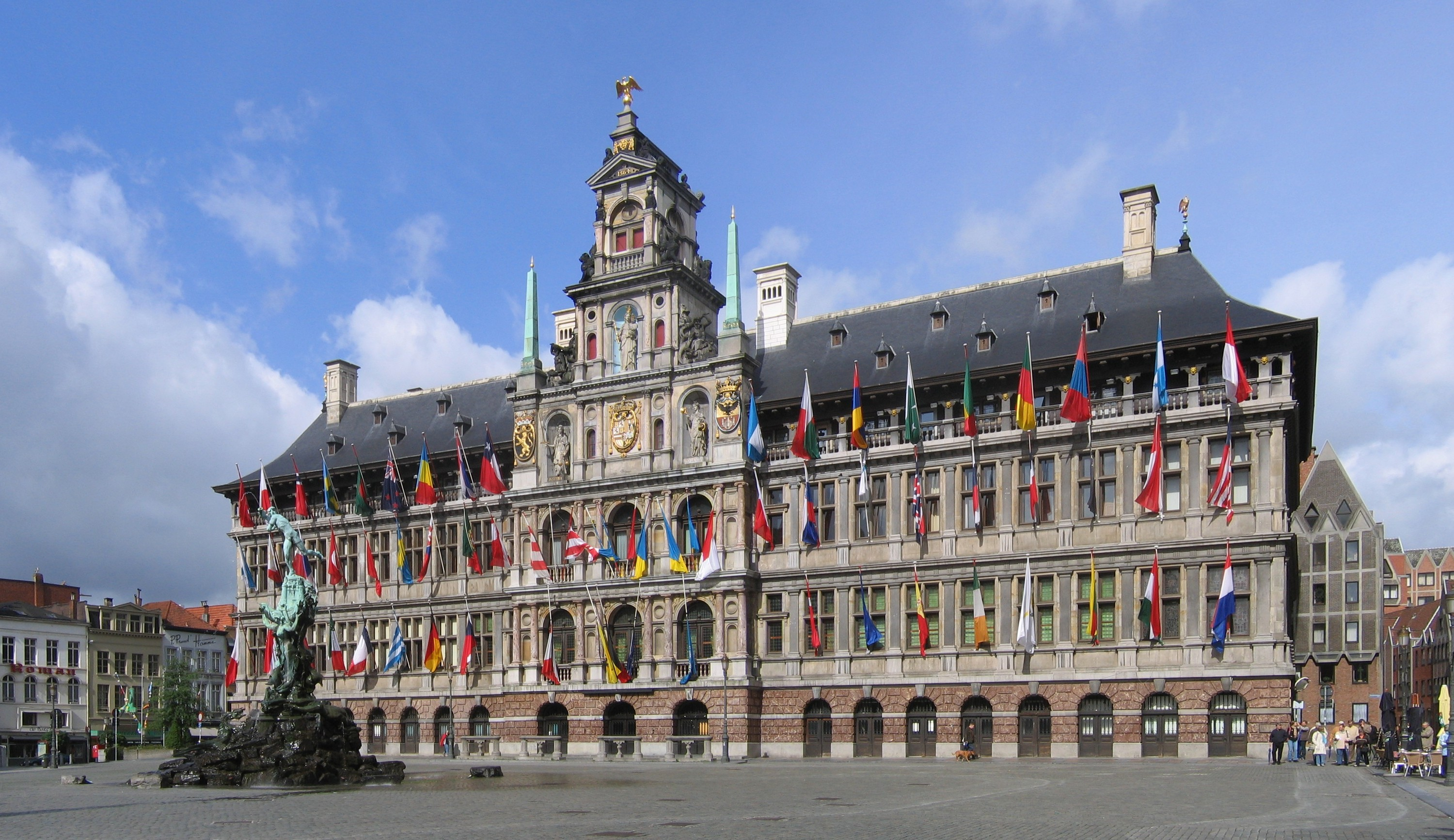
- Antwerp's City Hall seen from the Grote Markt

- Location within Belgium

General information
- Type: Town hall
- Architectural style: Renaissance
- Location: Antwerp, Belgium
- Coordinates: 51.2213°N 4.3992°E
- Construction started: 1561
- Completed: 1564

Design and construction
- Architects: Cornelis Floris De Vriendt and others

The City Hall (Dutch: Stadhuis) of Antwerp, Belgium, stands on the western side of that city's Grote Markt (main square). Erected between 1561 and 1565, after designs made by Cornelis Floris de Vriendt and several other architects and artists, this Renaissance building incorporates both Flemish and Italian influences. The building is listed as one of the Belfries of Belgium and France, a UNESCO World Heritage Site.

== History ==
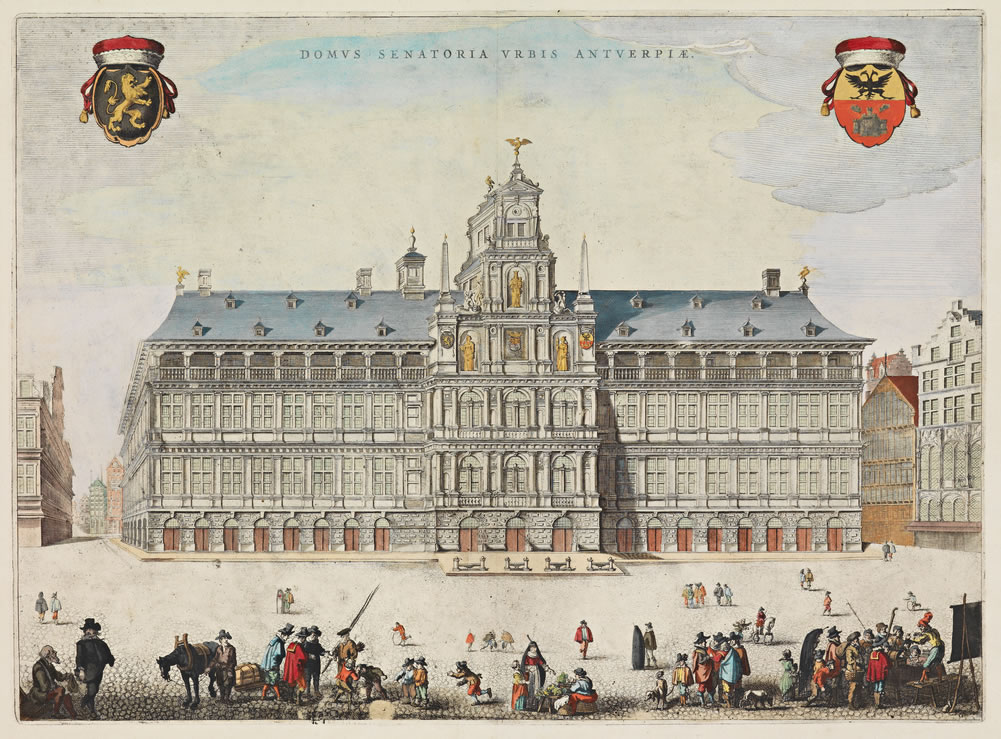
Antwerp's City Hall, c. 1609–1706

In the 16th century, Antwerp became one of the busiest trading ports and most prosperous cities in Northern Europe. The municipal authorities wished to replace the city's small medieval City Hall with a more imposing structure befitting the prosperity of the great port city. The local architect Domien de Waghemakere drafted a plan (c. 1540) for a new building in a style typical of the monumental Gothic town halls of Flanders and Brabant.

The threat of war, however, prevented any progress on the project. The building materials intended for the City Hall were instead used to shore up the city's defenses. It was not until about 1560 that new plans were developed. In the meantime, Gothic architecture had gone out of fashion, so the City Hall was designed in the new Renaissance style. Completed in 1565, the building lasted hardly a decade before being burnt to a shell in the Spanish Fury of 1576. It was restored three years later.

== Description ==
The low arcaded ground story is of rusticated stone, and at one time housed little shops. Above are two stories with Doric and Ionic columns separating large mullioned windows, and a fourth story forming an open gallery. The richly ornamented central section, which rises above the eaves in diminishing stages, holds female statues representing Justice, Prudence, and the Virgin Mary, and bears the coats of arms of the Duchy of Brabant, the Spanish Habsburgs, and the Margraviate of Antwerp.

Renovations during the late 19th century by architects Pierre Bruno Bourla, Joseph Schadde and Pieter Jan August Dens drastically modified the interior. Much of the stately decoration dates from this period, as does a roof over what was once an open-air inner courtyard. Many leading local historical painters were invited to assist with the decorations. Henri Leys painted a series of murals depicting key events in the city's history and portraits of former Belgian rulers for the Leys Hall.

== Influence abroad ==
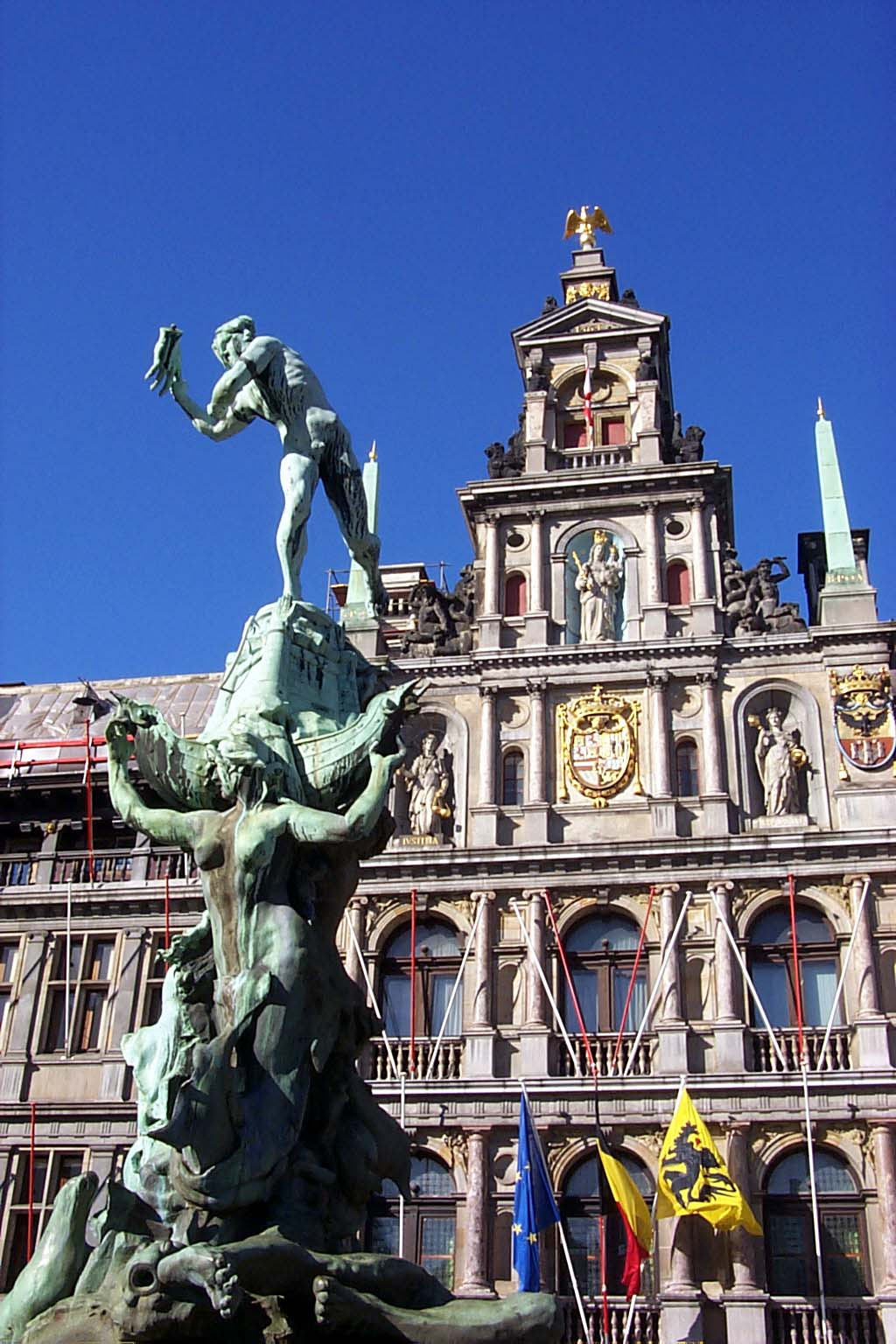
Frontal view of the City Hall with the Brabo Fountain (close-up)

Antwerp's City Hall became an exemplar for the new Renaissance style in architecture in the Netherlands and Northern Europe. The Stadhuis of Vlissingen and of The Hague in the Netherlands and the design of the Rathaus of Emden and the portico of the Rathaus of Cologne (1557) in Germany and the Green Gate (designed by Regnier or Reiner of Amsterdam) in Gdańsk, Poland were inspired by this new style.
