= Silvius Brabo =

Belgian folkloric character

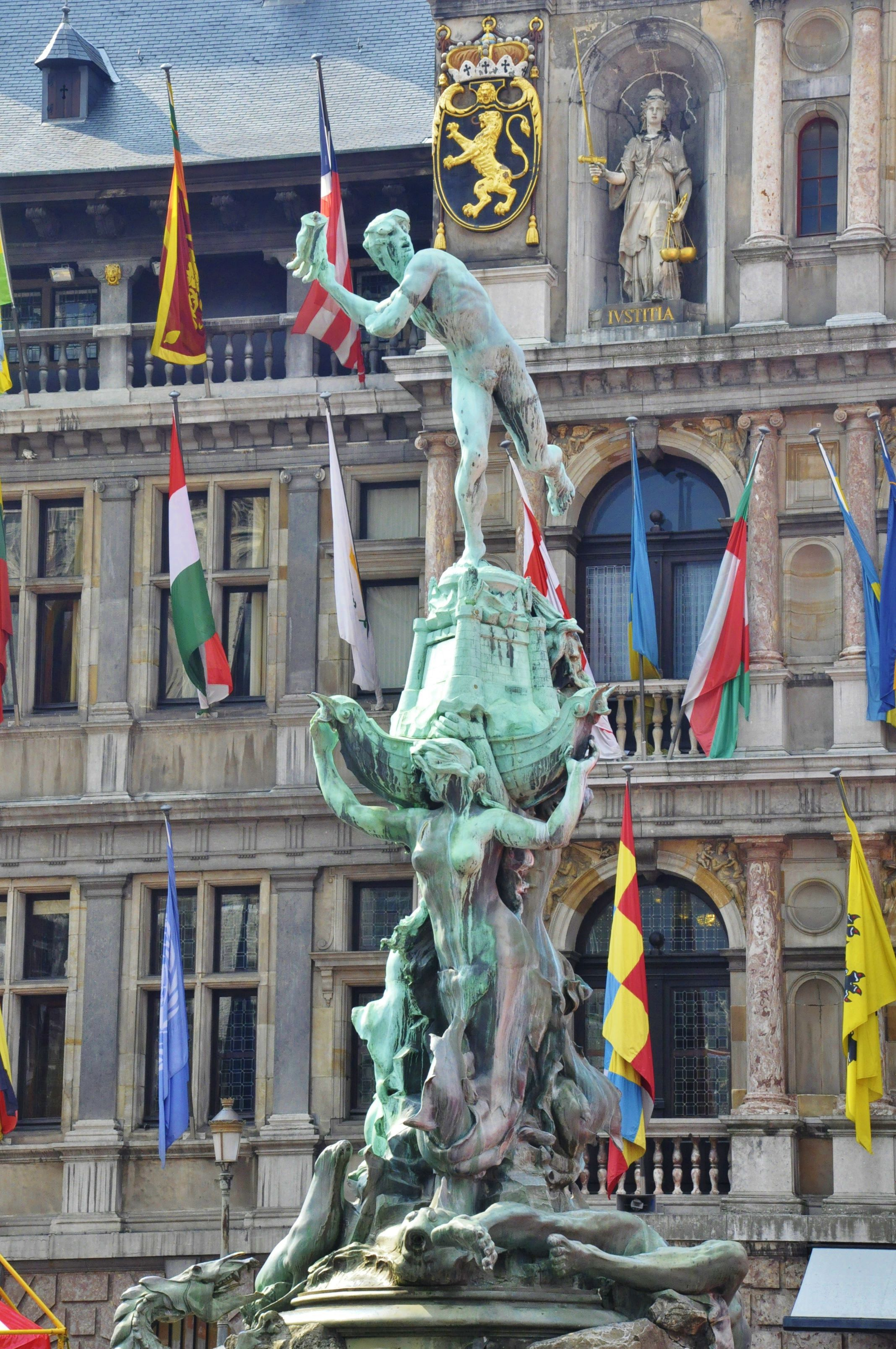
Brabo Fountain in Antwerp

Silvius Brabo [ˈsɪɫviəz ˈbraːboː] was a mythical Roman soldier and the legendary founder and namesake of the city of Antwerp and Duke of Brabant.

According to one version of the legend, the giant Druon Antigoon guarded a bridge over the Scheldt; another version has Druon guarding the port, demanding a tax from passing ships. When a person did not pay, Druon would cut off a hand (Dutch: hand) and throw (Dutch: werp) it into the river. Brabo, a young Roman soldier, challenged Druon, cutting off his hand and throwing it into the River. Thus, the City gained its Dutch name Antwerpen from handwerpen (lit. transl. throwing hands).

This mythical story is depicted by a fountain in front of the Antwerp City Hall.
