= Druon Antigoon =

Belgian folkloric character

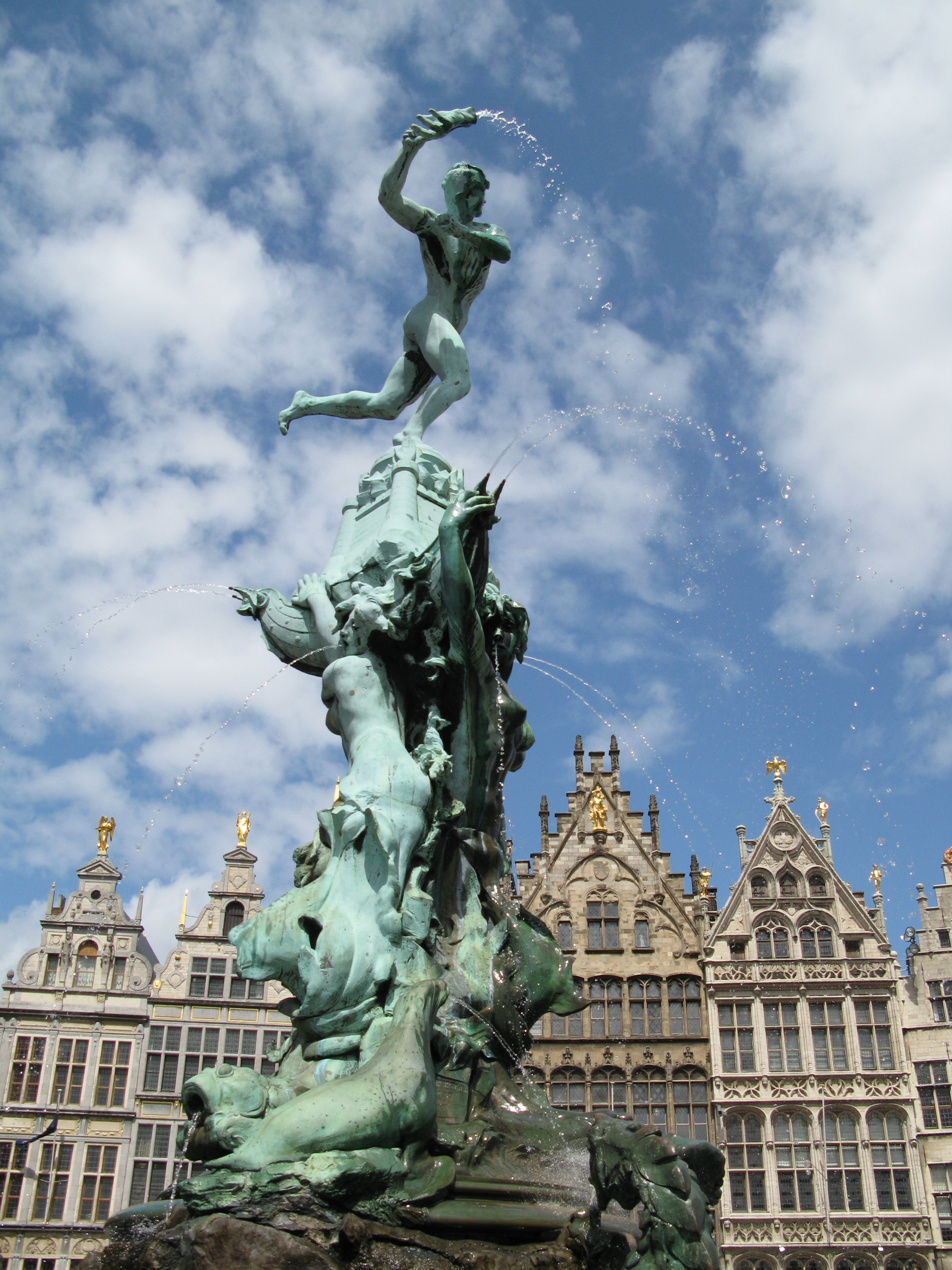
The Brabo fountain, in Antwerp. Brabo throws the severed hand of Antigoon into the Scheldt. Sculpture by Jef Lambeaux (in 1887)

Druon Antigoon or Druon Antigonus is a Belgian folkloric character. He was a mythical giant who lived in Antwerp.

== Mythology ==
Guarding a bridge on the river Scheldt, he exacted a toll from those crossing the river. For those who refused, he severed one of their hands and threw it into the river. Eventually, Antigoon was slain by a young Roman soldier named Brabo, who cut off the giant's own hand and flung it into the river.

According to folklore, and as celebrated by the statue in front of the town hall, this legend gives origin to the name Antwerp: Antwerpen, from Dutch hand werpen—akin to Old English hand and wearpan (= to throw), that has changed to today's warp.

== See also ==
- Antwerp hands
