= Ekeren =

- District of Antwerp
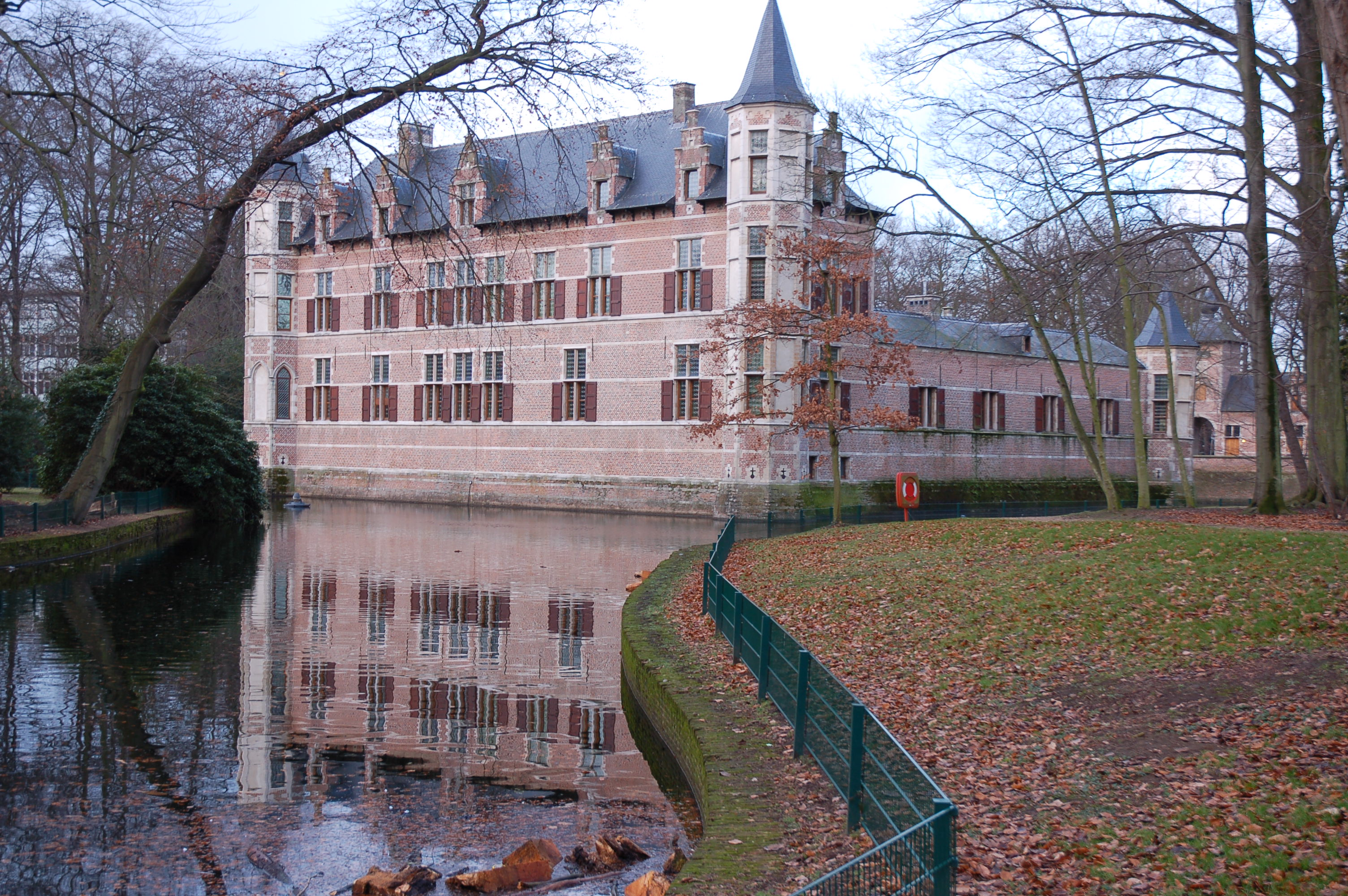
- The Hof van Veltwijck, home of the district council

- Flag Coat of arms
- Interactive map of Ekeren
- Location within Belgium Location within Antwerp Province
- Coordinates: 51°17′00″N 4°25′00″E
- Country: Belgium
- Community: Flemish Community
- Region: Flemish Region
- Province: Antwerp
- Arrondissement: Antwerp
- Municipality: Antwerp

Area
  - Total: 13.5 km^{2} (5.2 sq mi)

Population (2025-01-01)
  - Total: 29,284
  - Density: 2,170/km^{2} (5,620/sq mi)
- Postal codes: 2180
- Area codes: 03

Ekeren (Dutch pronunciation: ['eːkərə(n)]) is a northern district of the municipality of Antwerp in the Flemish Region of Belgium. The suburb celebrated its 850th birthday in 2005; the name of the town was first mentioned in 1155, as "Hecerna". The name possibly originates from Vikings who settled there in the ninth century after using the oak trees.

Ekeren used to be the home town of the Germinal Ekeren football club until Germinal merged with K. Beerschot V.A.C. into K.F.C. Germinal Beerschot (in 1999). The new club is based in the Olympisch Stadion in Antwerp.

Ekeren is home to the Jozef Pauly municipal academy for music and diction, which has around 2000 pupils as of 2004 (also counting branches in some other districts of the city of Antwerp, and one in the nearby municipality of Kapellen). The academy hosts many musical ensembles; the Jozef Pauly flute ensemble has made concert tours to Australia and the United States. Municipal music academies in Belgium are distinct from the public educational system; attending these academies is entirely optional, and merely a hobby for most of the students.

The 1 square kilometre large domain of the Oude Landen is a diverse natural sanctuary situated near the border with the Antwerp city district. Since it was a military area until 1972 (but not often used as such) where trespassing was strictly forbidden, nature was allowed to have its way for decades; the area now contains a rich mixture of plants and animals in eight more or less separate miniature ecosystems.

It was a separate municipality until 1983. On 1 January 1983, it was absorbed into the municipality of Greater Antwerp whereby Ekeren became one of the 9 districts.

The border between Ekeren and the Antwerp district was changed per 1 January 2019, which transferred several Antwerp neighbourhoods with about 5,000 inhabitants to Ekeren.

Ekeren is also the hometown of well known Belgian/American musician Christian Olde Wolbers of legendary American music group Fear Factory.

== History ==
In 1703, Ekeren was the site of a battle in the War of the Spanish Succession, known as the Battle of Ekeren. Some street names in Ekeren (for example, the "Successiestraat", "Vierkerkenstraat", and "Tweekronenstraat") still refer to this historical event.

During the Liberation of Belgium, Ekeren was liberated on 4 October 1944 by the Essex Scottish Regiment and the Royal Regiment of Canada. The last V-Bomb to land in the area of Antwerp was in Ekeren, on 28 March 1945.

== Government ==
Ekeren was a distinct municipality with its own town hall, mayor, and city council until 1983, when most of it, along with 8 other municipalities was merged into the city of Antwerp. In 2000 the Antwerp city council initiated additional district councils with responsibilities including sports, culture, youth and elderly people. Since this decentralization, the Antwerp municipality consists of nine districts (the old city, seven former municipalities at its borders, and the Bezali merger of three towns). The first district council of Ekeren, elected in 2000, was led by Christophe Thomas (Open Vld); the second district council, elected in 2006, by Ronny Kruyniers (sp.a). The current district council chairman is Koen Palinckx (N-VA) (elected in 2012). The district council gathers in the 16th century-era Hof van Veltwijck, which had seen major restructuring works around 2000; this complex also houses local administrative offices.

== Politics ==
=== District council ===
The current district council consisting of 21 members was elected in the 2024 local elections, with its governing coalition consisting of the parties New Flemish Alliance and Vooruit, led by acting district mayor Koen Palinckx (N-VA)

- Koen Palinckx (N-VA)
- Annemie Plompen (N-VA)
- Fabienne Van Damme (Vooruit)
- Marc Elseviers (N-VA)
- Maja Lopez Hartmann (N-VA)
- Freddy Geens (Vlaams Belang)
- Ingrid Weverbergh (GROEN)
- Kurt Van Noten (Vlaams Belang)
- Ann Koekhoven (N-VA)
- Brecht Mertens (N-VA)
- Martine Voets (N-VA)
- Jeroen Van den Bergh (CD&V)
- Serge Huybrechts (N-VA)
- Guy Goossens (PVDA) (Replacement for Laura De Feyter)
- Fabienne Toussein (GROEN)
- Alec Claessens (N-VA)
- Nik Kruyniers (Vooruit)
- Bob Muyllaert (N-VA)
- Muhabatullah Laiq (PVDA)
- Wendy Mendonck (Vlaams Belang)
- Steven Naeyaert (Vlaams Belang)

== Notable residents ==
- Vlaams Belang politician Filip Dewinter (1962–)
- Libera Carlier, writer (1926–2007)
- Georges Morren, painter, sculptor, engraver (1868–1941)
- Sanne Cant, Belgian Cyclo-cross racing cyclist, three times world champion (1990–)

== Sister cities ==
- Andernach, Germany
- Newry, Northern Ireland
