= Morren =

Morren is a surname. Notable people with the name include:

- Charles François Antoine Morren (1807–1858), Belgian botanist and horticulturist
- Charles Jacques Édouard Morren (1833–1886), Belgian botanist, professor of botany
- François Morren (1899–1985), Belgian sprinter
- George Morren (1868–1941), Belgian painter, sculptor, Impressionist and engraver
- Nathaniel Morren (1798–1847), Scottish minister, author and historian
- Theophil Morren (1874–1929), pen name of Hugo von Hofmannsthal, Austrian novelist, librettist & poet
- Tommy Morren (1871–1929), English international footballer
