= Merksem =

- District of Antwerp
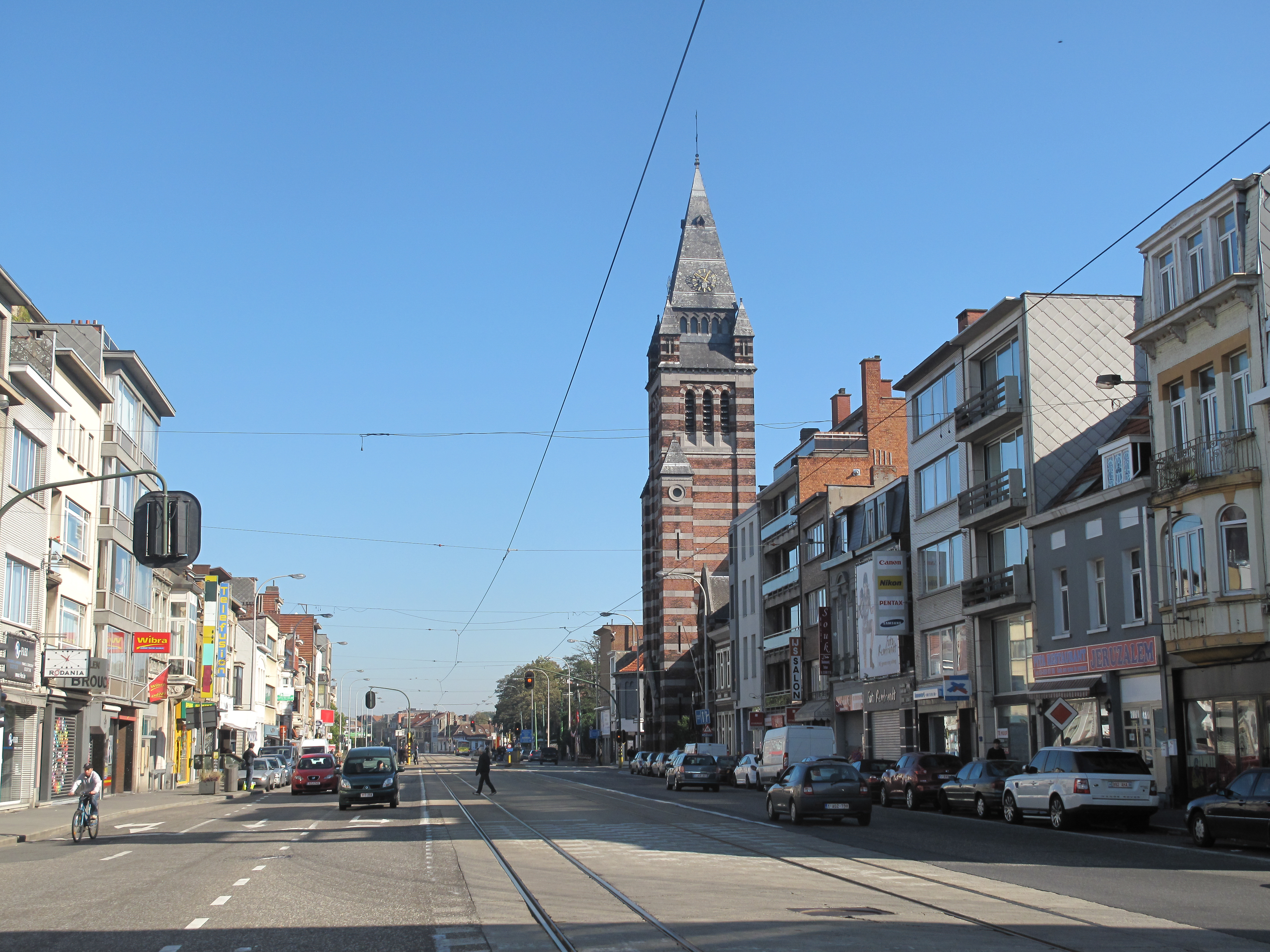
- Merksem, a view on major axis Bredabaan

- Flag Coat of arms

- Location of Merksem in Antwerp
- Interactive map of Merksem
- Location within Belgium Location within Antwerp Province
- Coordinates: 51°14′34″N 4°26′29″E
- Country: Belgium
- Community: Flemish Community
- Region: Flemish Region
- Province: Antwerp
- Arrondissement: Antwerp
- Municipality: Antwerp

Area
  - Total: 8.28 km^{2} (3.20 sq mi)
- Highest elevation: 6.1 m (20 ft)
- Lowest elevation: 0 m (0 ft)

Population (2025-01-01)
  - Total: 47,525
  - Density: 5,740/km^{2} (14,900/sq mi)
- Postal codes: 2170
- Area codes: 03

Merksem (Dutch pronunciation: [ˈmɛr(ə)ksɛm]; former spelling: Merxem) is a district of the municipality and city of Antwerp in the Flemish Region of Belgium. It has 47,525 inhabitants as of 2025.

It was a separate municipality until 1983. On 1 January 1983, it was absorbed into the municipality of Greater Antwerp whereby Merksem became one of the 9 districts.

== History ==
The history of Merksem goes back to Gallo-Roman times. During that period the region was mentioned as Merk (border) and Heim (settlement) being part of the diocese Kamerijk. Merksem has for centuries been part of a larger community together with Schoten and Sint-Job-in-'t-Goor. During the Spanish period Merksem used to be a Dominium, a known Lord of Mercxem is Anthony van Stralen. In the 16th century Merksem was separated from Schoten.

=== Middle Ages ===
Around the year 600, the Franks started colonizing the area near the local Saint-Bartholomew's Church, which was the highest point of Merksem at the time. In 750, the Scheldt river finally started settling itself into its current river bed, which resulted in parts of Merksem becoming peat bog (a type of wetland). Current street names of these areas still refer to these wetlands. (The 1998 and 1999 floods of some residential areas were due to Merksem's geographical location. This would later result in the deepening of the Schijn tributary). In May 1561, Merksem and Schoten were split up.

The current Bredabaan (Breda Road) functioned as a gate between Antwerp and cities located to the north. In 1742, the road would become a toll road.

=== 19th century ===
At the beginning of the 19th century, Merksem was a very rural area with a population of 750. Local farmers mainly provided the nearby city of Antwerp with straw, giving the inhabitants of Merksem the nickname "stroboeren" (straw farmers). In 1874, the area became more industrialized, and most of the land was bought by S.A. Etablissements Industriels et Commerciaux de Merxem. The company would construct the local industry dock (known as 'het dokske'). Due to its ideal location, multiple industrial and commercial companies started to establish themselves in the area, contributing to the population increase.

=== 20th century ===
During World War II, Merksem was occupied by Nazi Germany from 20 May 1940 until its liberation on 4 October 1944. The local population was affected by political repression, deportation, hunger, bombings etc. Many locals opposed the occupation. Resistance fighters were deported to the nearby concentration camp of Breendonk.

=== Bredabaan ===
The road currently known as Bredabaan (Breda Road), once a major northern access to Antwerp, begins in Merksem and goes up north, all the way up until the border with the Netherlands. It ends in the Dutch city of Breda (hence the name). Other major axes would include Lambrechtshoekenlaan, Groenendaallaan, Maantjessteenweg and Ringlaan. Together with Bredabaan they could be considered as the boundaries of the centre of Merksem. Another main axis, that constitutes most of the southern border of the district, is a canal called the Albert Canal, which connects the Port of Antwerp to the river Meuse near Liège and is an important connection for inland freight shipping.

== Economy ==
When Delsey Airlines (VG Airlines) existed, its head office was in Merksem.

== Sport and culture ==
The Sportpaleis and the Lotto Arena are both located in the district of Merksem and host major sporting events, live music and festivals. The football team of Merksem is "SC City Pirates Antwerp". They play in the fourth division of the Belgian league pyramid system.

== Gallery ==
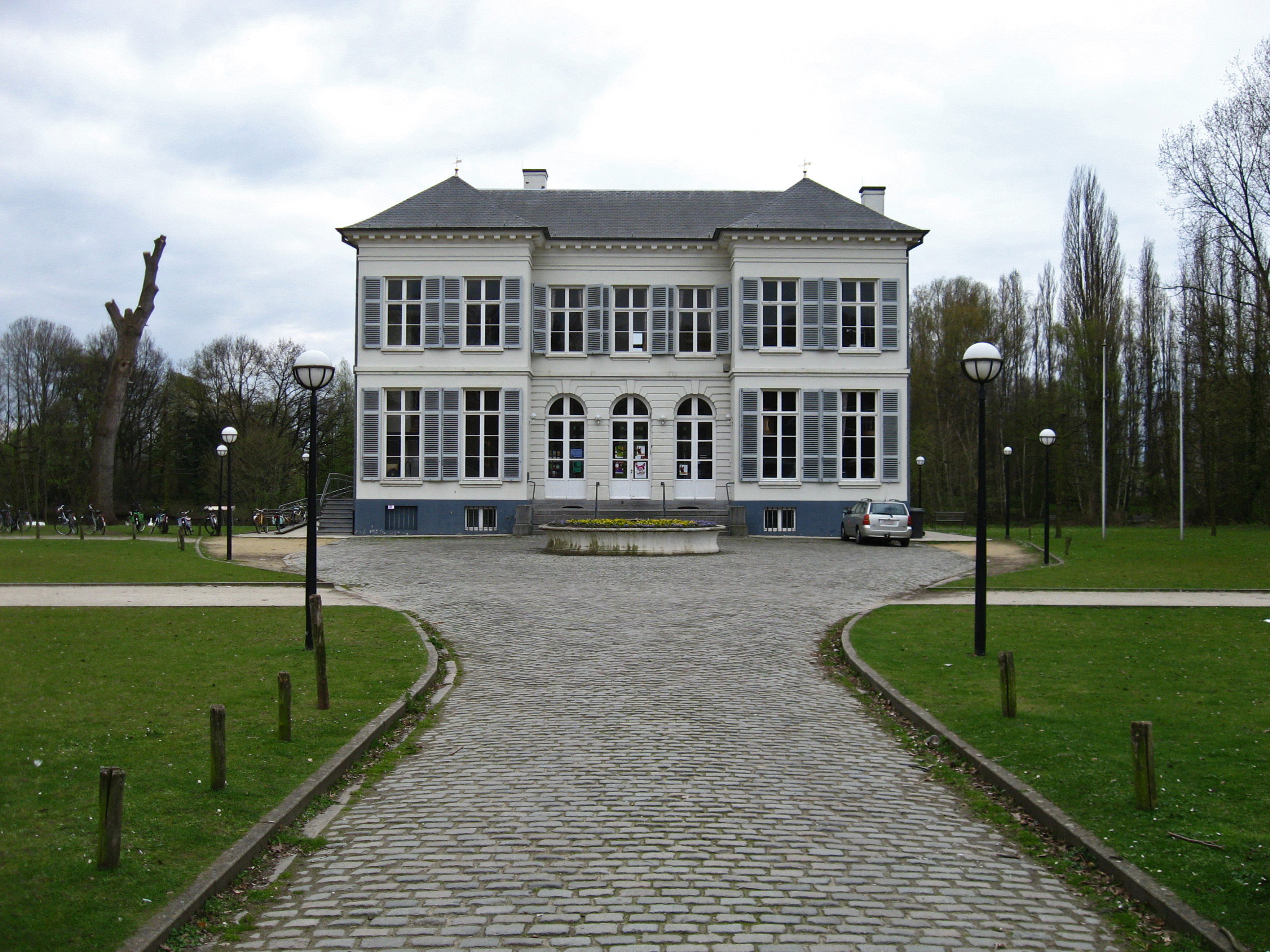
Bouckenborgh Castle

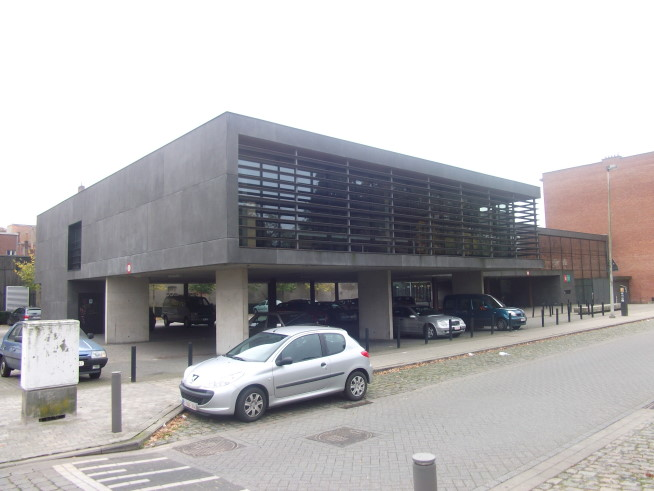
Library

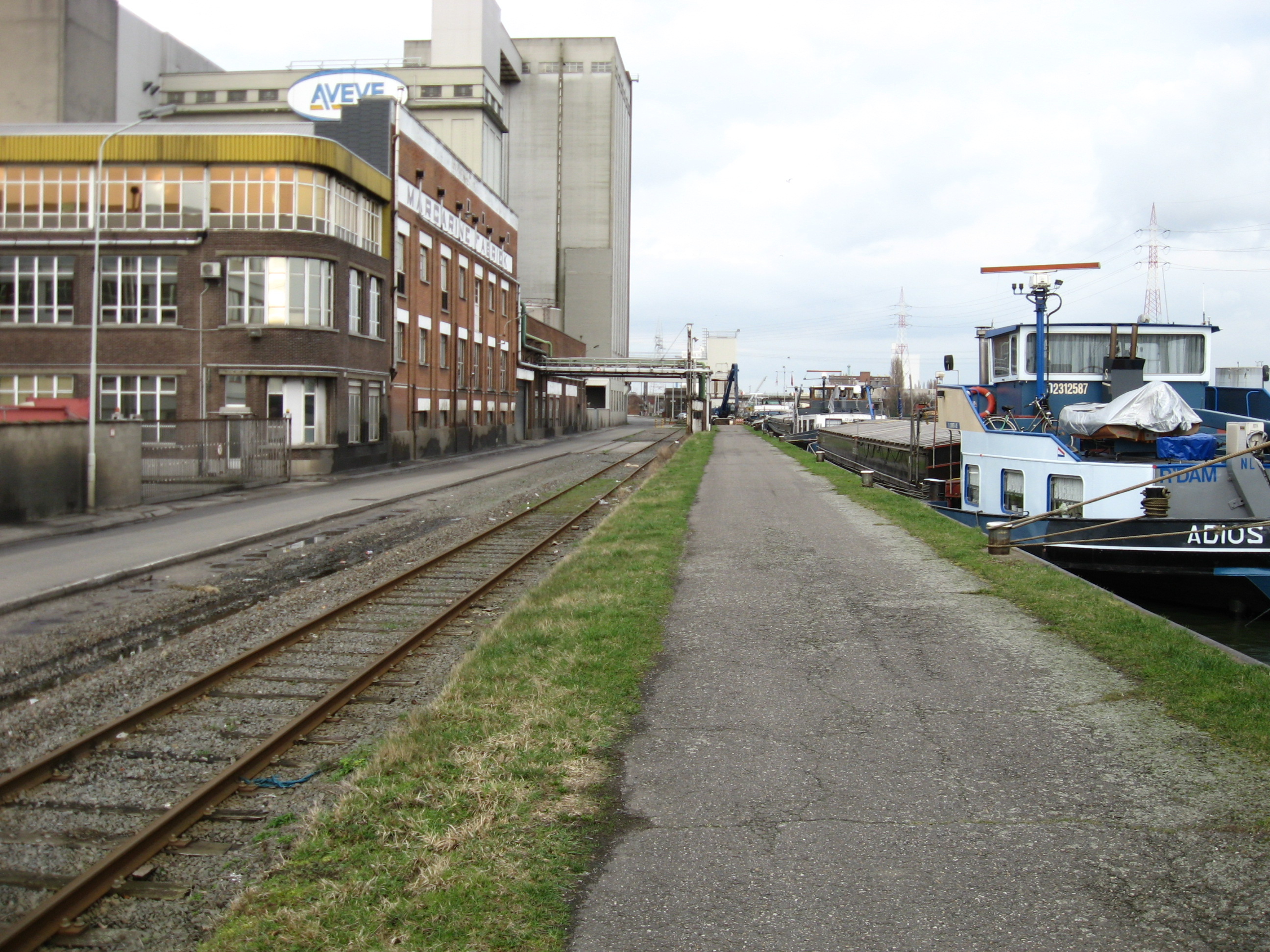
Canal and industry

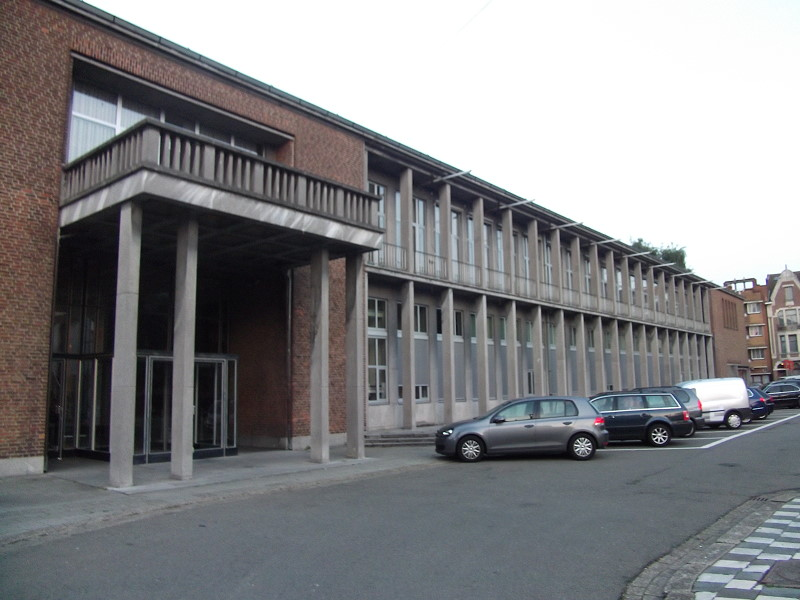
District house
