= Zandvliet =

- Neighbourhood
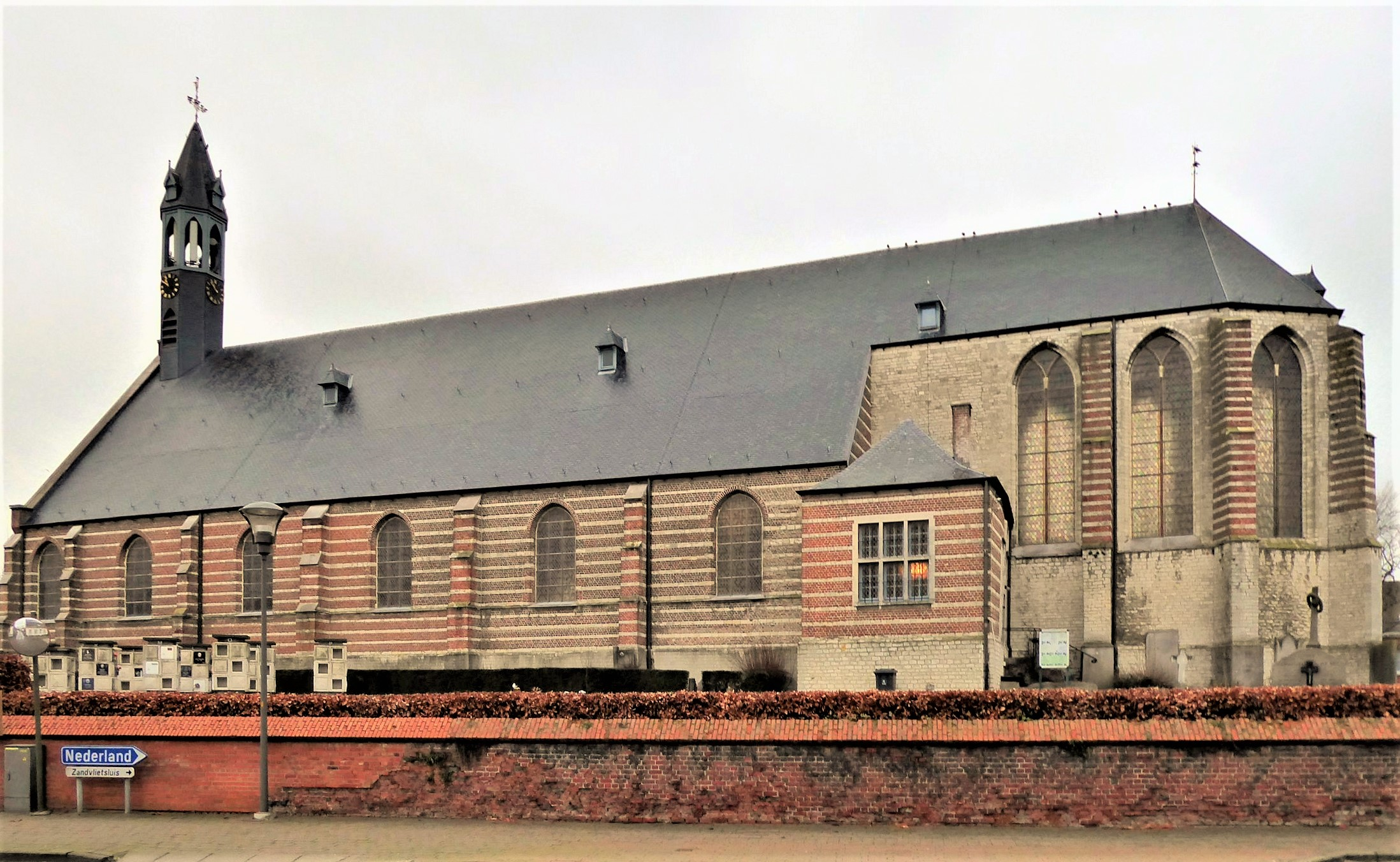
- Sint-Gertrudis church, Zandvliet

- Location in Belgium Location in the Province of Antwerp
- Coordinates: 51°21′33″N 4°18′32″E
- Country: Belgium
- Region: Flemish Region
- Province: Antwerp
- Municipality: Antwerp

Area
  - Total: 17.29 km^{2} (6.68 sq mi)

Population (2021)
  - Total: 3,864
  - Density: 223.5/km^{2} (578.8/sq mi)
- Time zone: CET

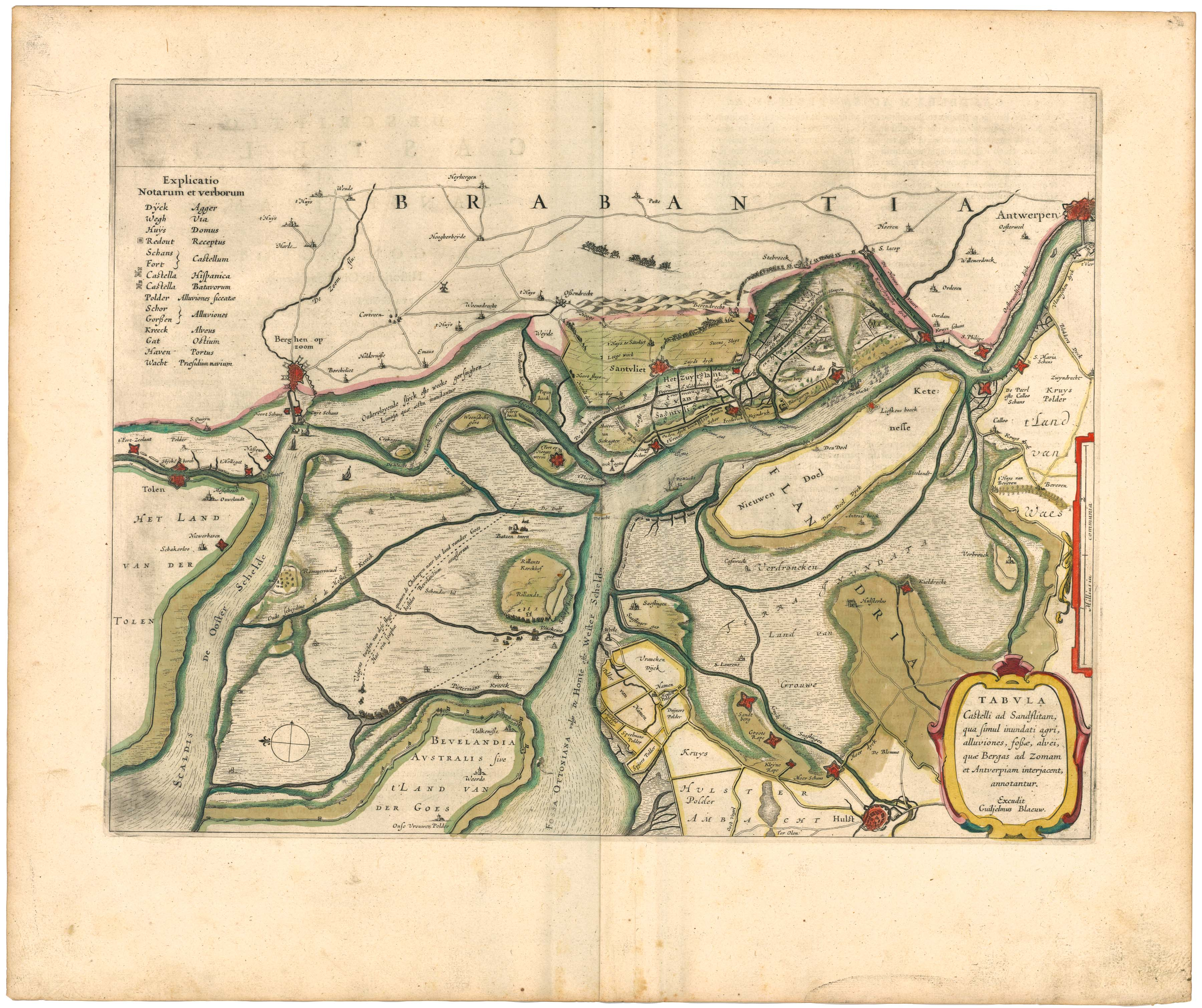
Map of the Castle near Zandvliet together with the flood lands, polders, canals and streambeds that lie between Bergen op Zoom and Antwerp, 1645

Zandvliet (Dutch pronunciation: [ˈzɑntflit]) is a former Belgian town forming part of the Antwerp district of Berendrecht-Zandvliet-Lillo. The place dates back to 1135 when it was known as Santflit, meaning "a navigable passage through sand".

In 1622 the Spaniard Ambrogio Spinola constructed a fortification with seven bastions around Zandvliet, to strengthen the defenses of Antwerp against the northern Netherlands. The project lasted six years and gave the town the appearance of a citadel. At the beginning of the 18th century France drove Spain from Zandvliet after which the fortress became derelict. Traces of the original fortress can be seen in the street layout of Conterscherp, Zuidvest and Begijnhoeve.

The church in Zandvliet was destroyed during the wars against Spain, but was rebuilt in 1648 by the bishop of Saint Michael's Abbey in Antwerp. After Belgium gained its independence in 1830, J. Bril became the first Belgian mayor of Zandvliet. In 1887 a rail link between Antwerp and Bergen op Zoom also linked to Zandvliet. This line mainly transported sugar beet, but also catered for passengers.

In 1958 Berendrecht, Zandvliet and Lillo were incorporated in Antwerp and the polder landscape largely expropriated for harbour development. Since the decentralisation of 2000 these three old communities were joined under the name of Bezali, an acronym used by the media. The people of Berendrecht-Zandvliet-Lillo on the other hand were proud of the original names and used them in the hope that they would not be forgotten. The name Zandvliet became a household name, thanks to the 1967 naming of Zandvlietsluis, one of the largest sea locks in the world.
