= Berendrecht-Zandvliet-Lillo =

- District of Antwerp
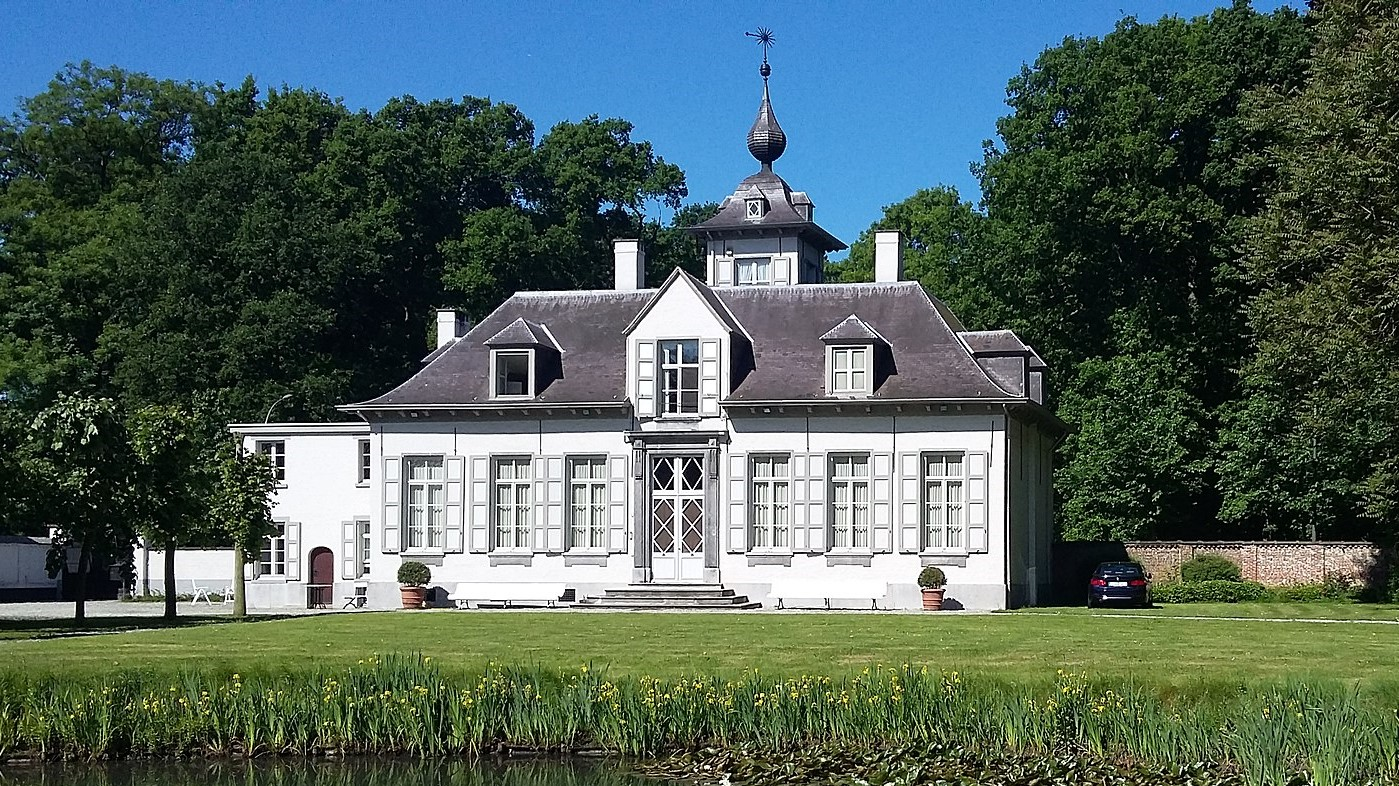
- Castle Berendrecht

- Flag Coat of arms
- Interactive map of Berendrecht-Zandvliet-Lillo
- Location within Belgium Location within Antwerp Province
- Coordinates: 51°21′00″N 4°18′00″E
- Country: Belgium
- Community: Flemish Community
- Region: Flemish Region
- Province: Antwerp
- Arrondissement: Antwerp
- Municipality: Antwerp

Area
  - Total: 52.66 km^{2} (20.33 sq mi)

Population (2025-01-01)
  - Total: 10,029
  - Density: 190.4/km^{2} (493.3/sq mi)
- Postal codes: 2040
- Area codes: 03

Berendrecht (Dutch pronunciation: [ˈbeːrə(n)drɛxt]), Zandvliet (Dutch pronunciation: [ˈzɑntflit]) and Lillo (Dutch pronunciation: [ˈlɪloː]) are three towns along the seaport docks north of the old city of Antwerp in Flanders, Belgium. The substantial 1983 merger with former municipalities led in 2000 to the decentralisation of this enlarged municipality of Antwerp, while these three towns merged into one of the city's districts, called Berendrecht-Zandvliet-Lillo or Bezali.
