= Borsbeek =

District of Antwerp

- District of Antwerp
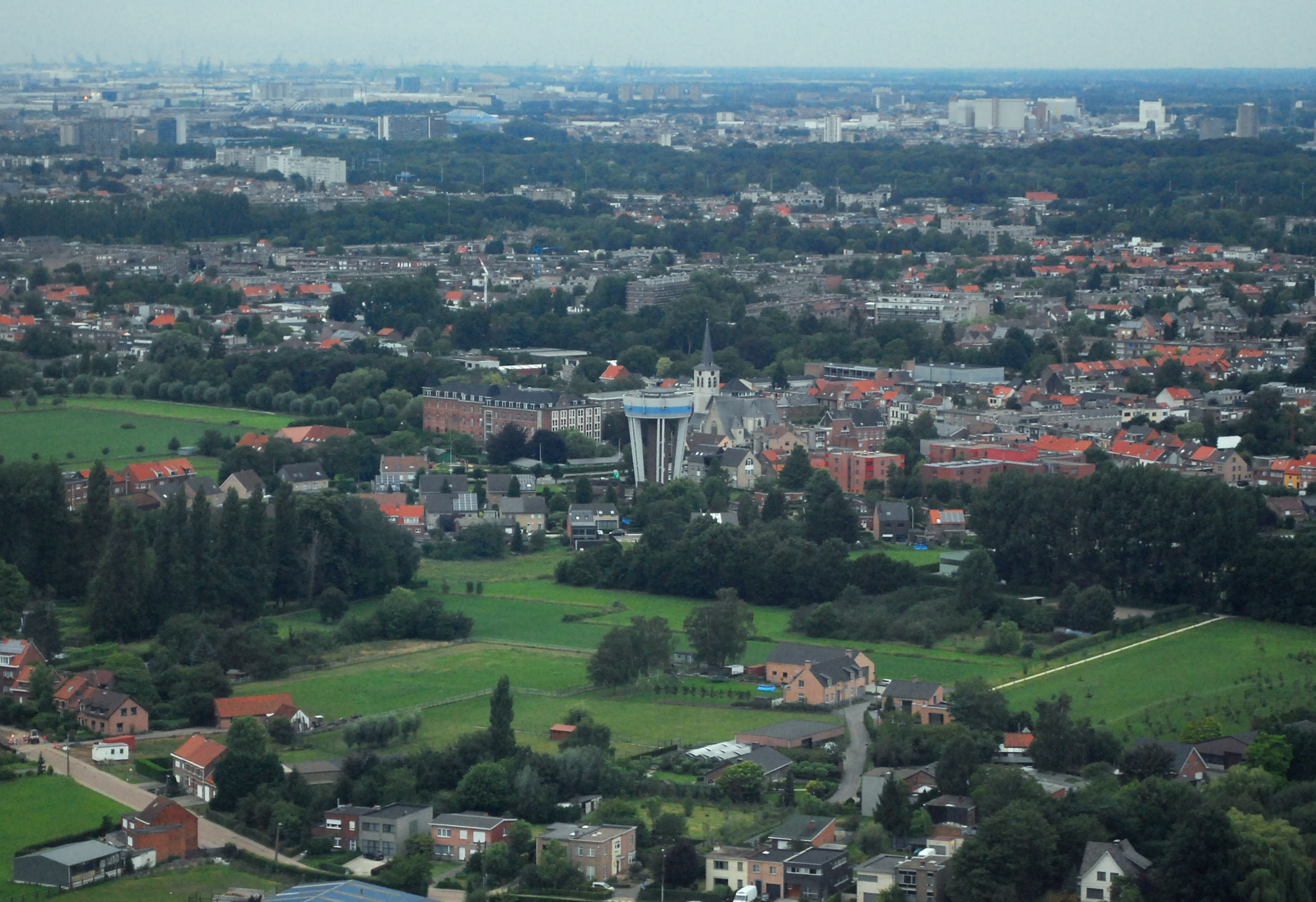

- Flag Coat of arms
- Interactive map of Borsbeek
- Location within Belgium Location within Antwerp Province
- Coordinates: 51°12′00″N 04°29′00″E
- Country: Belgium
- Community: Flemish Community
- Region: Flemish Region
- Province: Antwerp
- Arrondissement: Antwerp
- Municipality: Antwerp

Area
  - Total: 3.9 km^{2} (1.5 sq mi)

Population (2025-01-01)
  - Total: 11,459
  - Density: 2,900/km^{2} (7,600/sq mi)
- Postal codes: 2150
- Area codes: 03

Borsbeek (Dutch pronunciation: [ˈbɔrzbeːk]) is a district and former municipality in Antwerp, in the Flemish Region of Belgium.

== History ==
Borsbeek was first mentioned in 1232. In 1264, it becomes an independent parish. Until the 16th century, it was part of the County of Cantecroy. In the late 16th century, during the Dutch Revolt, Borsbeek was pillaged and destroyed several times. In 1746, the village was nearly wiped out during the War of the Austrian Succession. Borsbeek used to be an agricultural community. In the mid 20th century, it became a centre of horticulture and a residential town.

On 28 January 2022, the mayors of Borsbeek and Antwerp announced their intent to merge. This has been approved by both local governments and the small, densely populated town of Borsbeek became the 10th district of the city of Antwerp on 1 January 2025.

== Climate ==
Climate data for Borsbeek (1991−2020 normals)
Month	Jan	Feb	Mar	Apr	May	Jun	Jul	Aug	Sep	Oct	Nov	Dec	Year
Mean daily maximum °C (°F)	6.6 (43.9)	7.6 (45.7)	11.1 (52.0)	15.3 (59.5)	18.9 (66.0)	21.6 (70.9)	23.7 (74.7)	23.5 (74.3)	20.0 (68.0)	15.3 (59.5)	10.3 (50.5)	7.0 (44.6)	15.1 (59.2)
Daily mean °C (°F)	3.9 (39.0)	4.3 (39.7)	6.9 (44.4)	10.2 (50.4)	14.0 (57.2)	16.9 (62.4)	19.0 (66.2)	18.6 (65.5)	15.3 (59.5)	11.3 (52.3)	7.2 (45.0)	4.4 (39.9)	11.0 (51.8)
Mean daily minimum °C (°F)	1.1 (34.0)	1.0 (33.8)	2.7 (36.9)	5.0 (41.0)	9.1 (48.4)	12.2 (54.0)	14.2 (57.6)	13.7 (56.7)	10.7 (51.3)	7.3 (45.1)	4.1 (39.4)	1.8 (35.2)	6.9 (44.4)
Average precipitation mm (inches)	69.9 (2.75)	61.5 (2.42)	55.3 (2.18)	42.3 (1.67)	59.5 (2.34)	73.9 (2.91)	79.3 (3.12)	85.1 (3.35)	72.3 (2.85)	66.8 (2.63)	77.3 (3.04)	91.4 (3.60)	834.6 (32.86)
Average precipitation days (≥ 1.0 mm)	12.4	11.1	10.4	8.6	9.7	10.0	10.3	10.5	9.7	10.8	12.5	13.9	129.9
Mean monthly sunshine hours	59	77	134	190	219	219	225	211	164	116	65	50	1,729
Source: Royal Meteorological Institute

== Notable people ==
See the Category:People from Borsbeek.

== Gallery ==
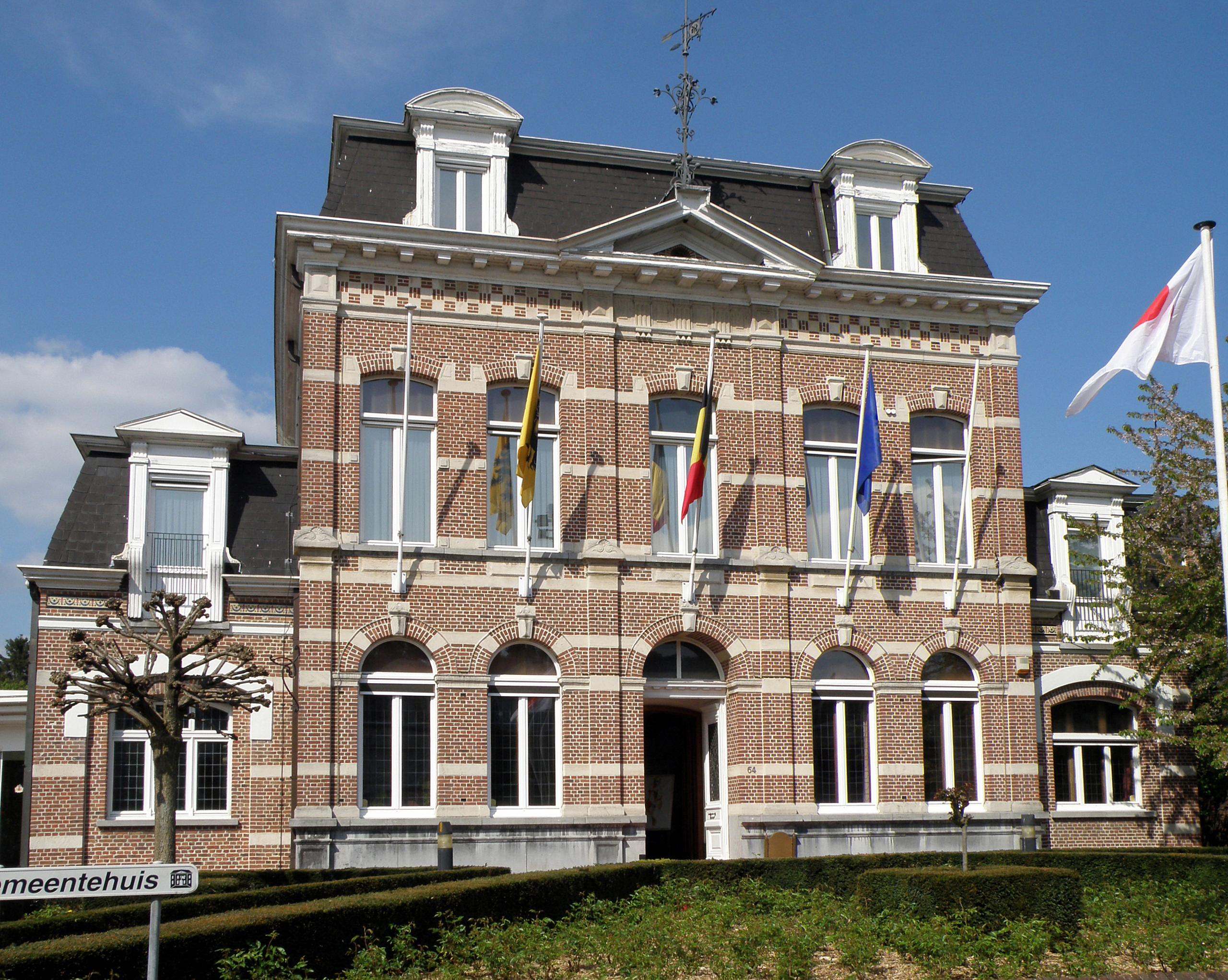
Town hall

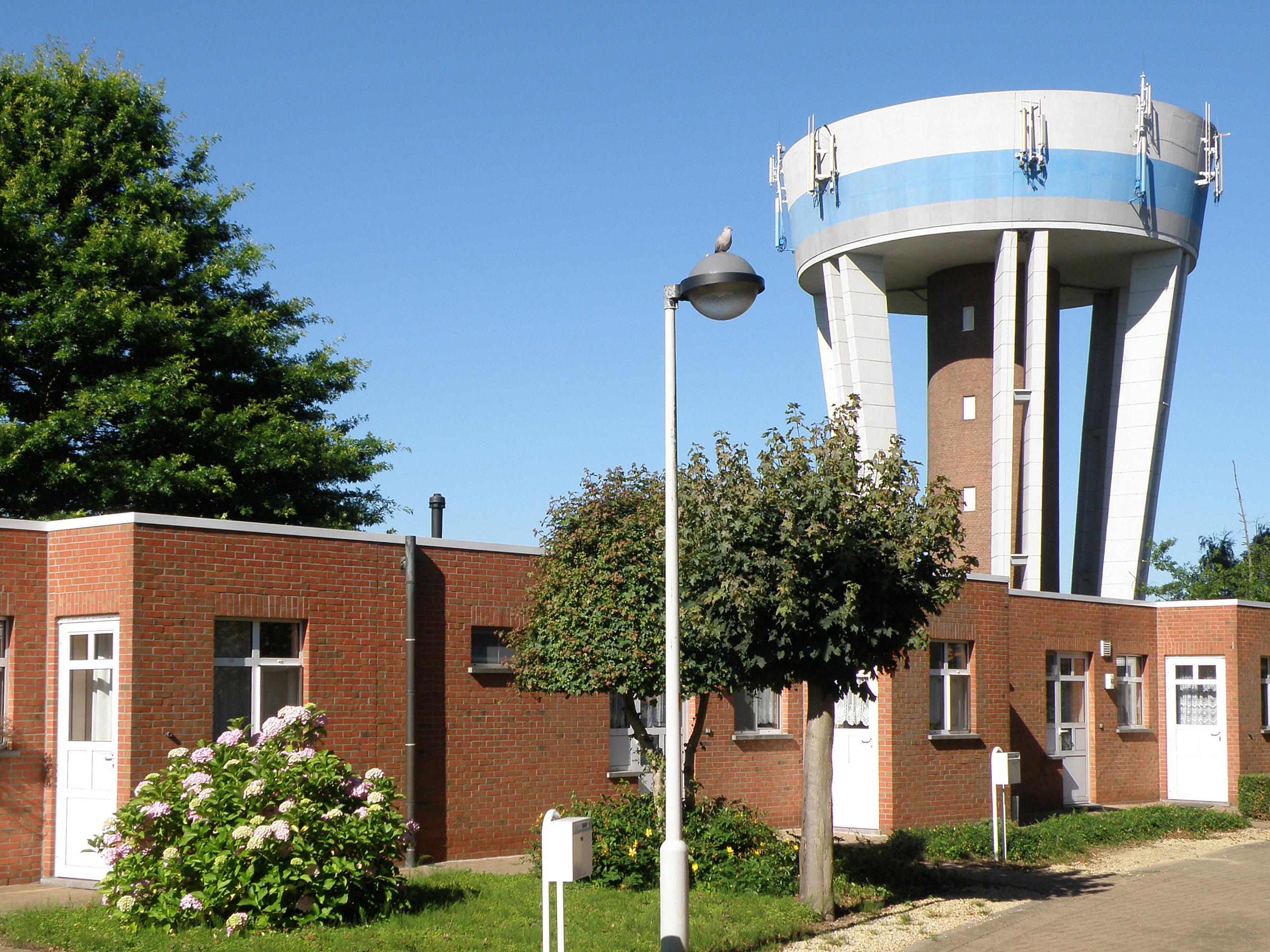
Water tower of Borsbeek

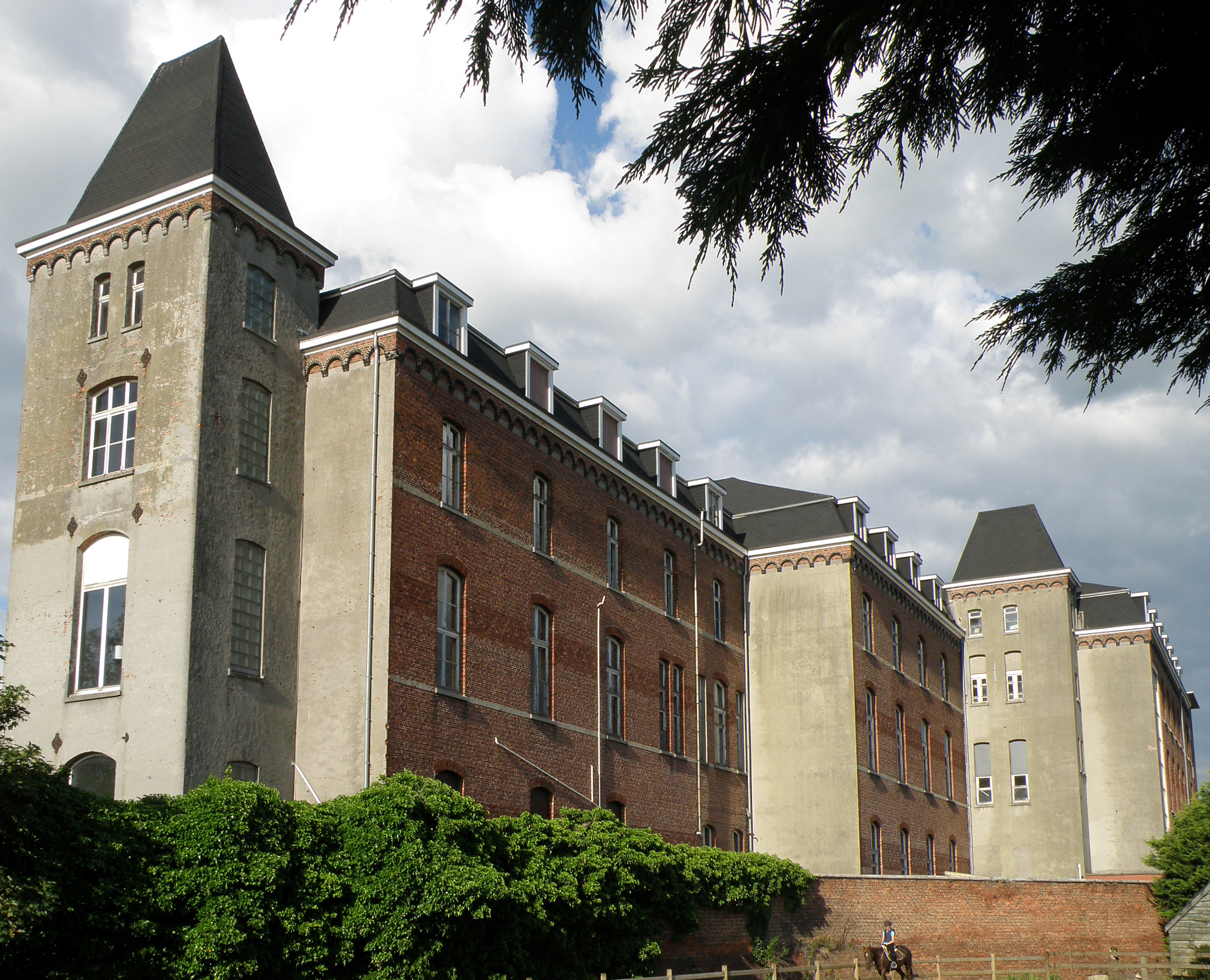
St Josef Institute

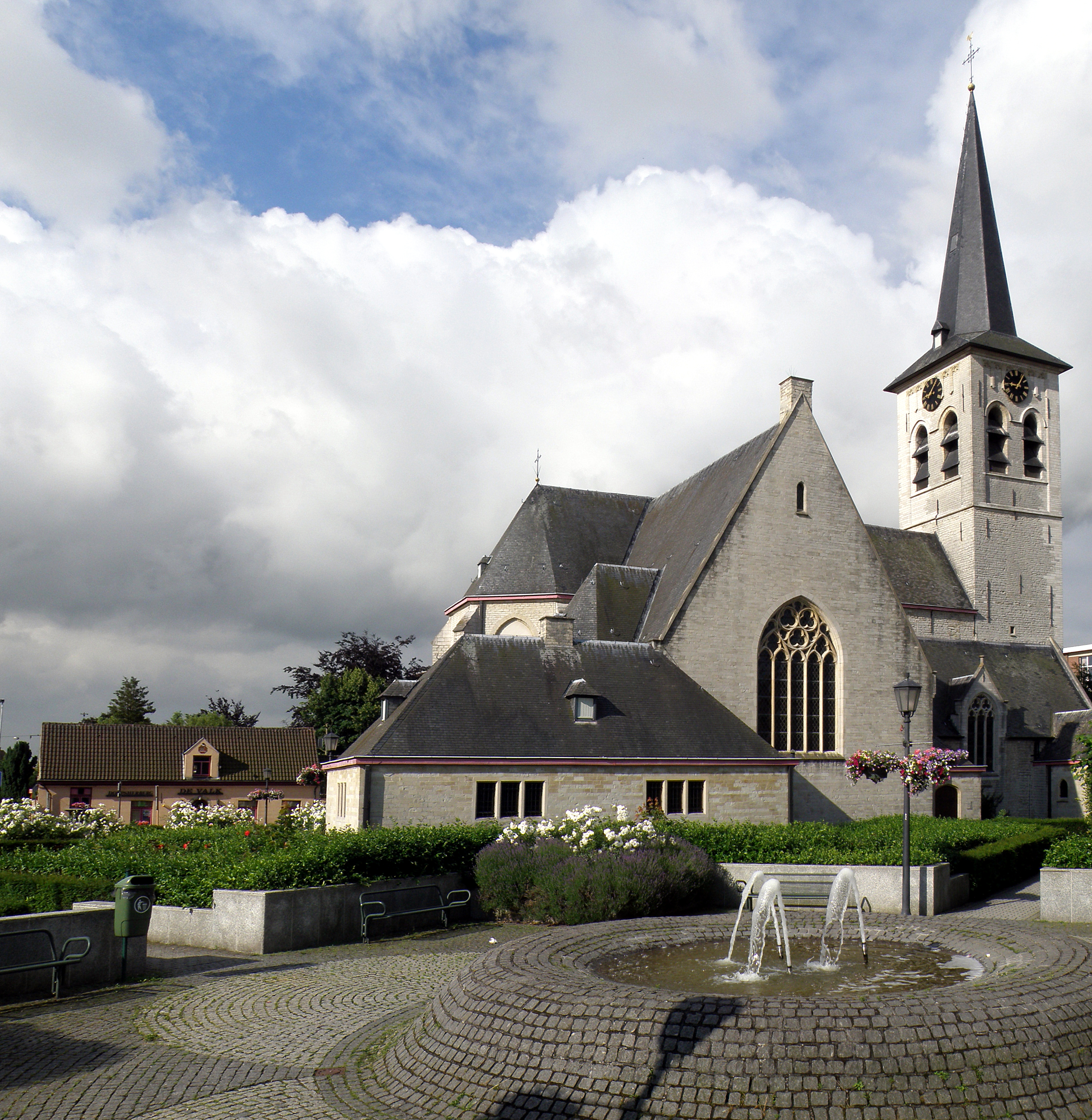
St Jacobs Church
