= Districts of Antwerp =

Urban districts of Antwerp, Belgium

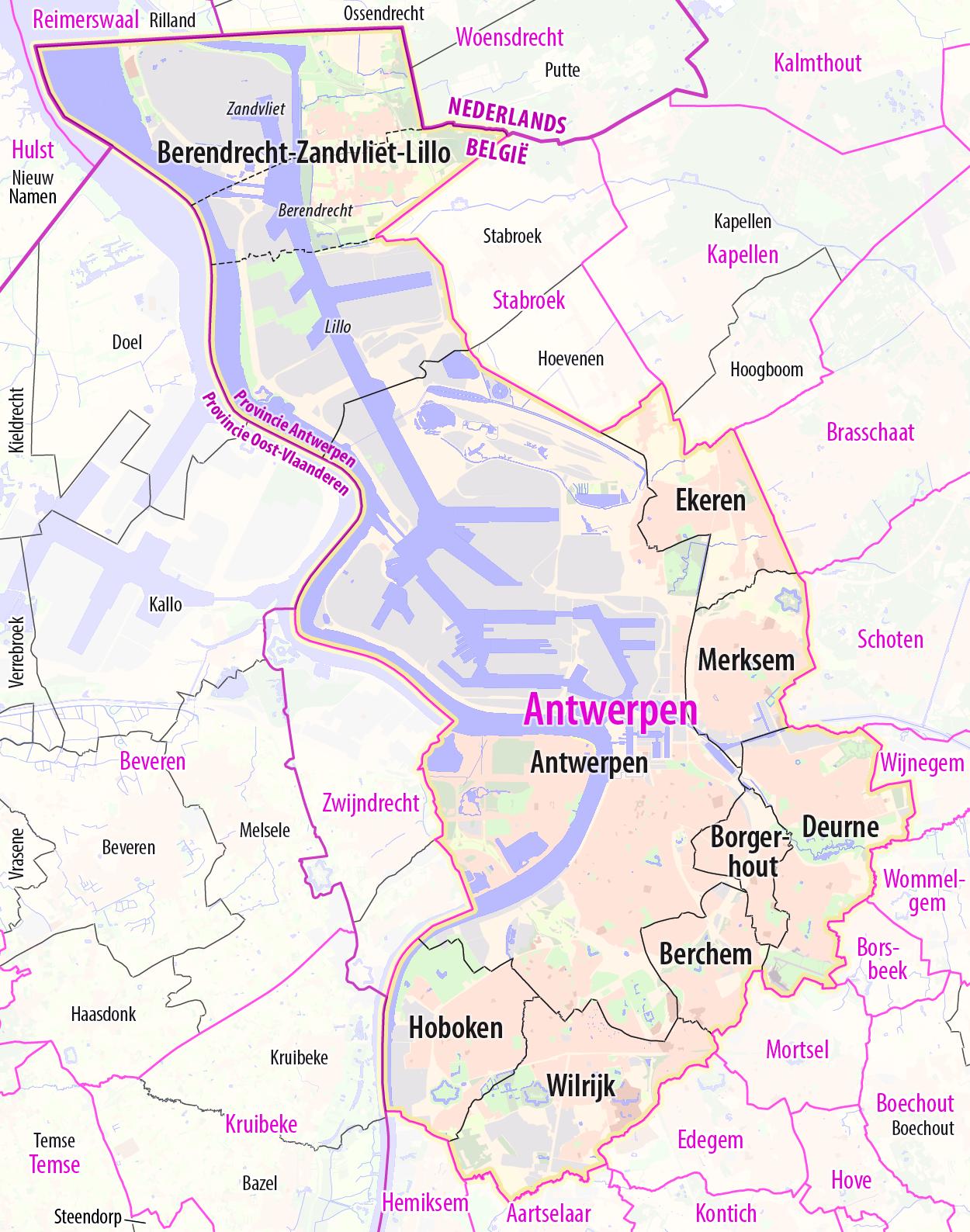
Districts of Antwerp (+ Borsbeek).

The Belgian city of Antwerp consists of ten former municipalities (called deelgemeenten) which have the status of district.

1. Antwerp
2. Berchem
3. Berendrecht-Zandvliet-Lillo
4. Borgerhout
5. Borsbeek
6. Deurne
7. Ekeren
8. Hoboken
9. Merksem
10. Wilrijk

== Status of district in Belgium ==
Most Belgian municipalities are made up of former municipalities that were merged in the past. Called deelgemeenten, they do not have any political function, and limited administrative use, as only the current, "larger" municipalities have elected councils.

However, Article 41 of the Belgian Constitution provides for the possibility of implementing districts for any municipality with at least 100,000 inhabitants. In such cases, the districts have elected "district councils" and a "district college", but only Antwerp has made use of that provision.

Other cities in which the provision theoretically could be implemented are Ghent, Bruges and Leuven in Flanders; Charleroi, Liège and Namur in Wallonia; and the City of Brussels, Anderlecht and Schaerbeek in Brussels Region (although Anderlecht and Schaerbeek do not contain other former municipalities).

There have repeatedly been proposals to merge the 19 municipalities of Brussels into a single municipality.
