= Alec Claessens =

Belgian politician (born 2005)

- Claessens in 2025

District Council Member in Ekeren
- Incumbent
- Assumed office 6 January 2025

Personal details
- Born: 1 June 2005 (age 21) Borgerhout, Belgium
- Party: New-Flemish Alliance (since 2023)
- Education: University of Antwerp
- Website: N-VA Ekeren Website

Alec Claessens (born 1 June 2005) is a Belgian politician representing the New Flemish Alliance (N-VA) in the District Council of Ekeren, Antwerp. He was elected during the 2024 Belgian local elections and took office on 6 January 2025. He is also the chairman of the N-VA's youth wing in Ekeren.

== Early life ==
Born on 1 June 2005 in Borgerhout, Claessens attended the Royal Athenaeum of Ekeren, where he studied economics and math. He now studies history at the University of Antwerp.

The late Erwin Brentjens, a former mayor of Turnhout, was Claessens' uncle.

== Political career ==
One of his first ventures in politics was to attend the Flemish Youth Parliament in November 2023. Later, the mayor of Ekeren, Koen Palinckx, helped convince Claessens to participate in the local elections of 2024.

That year, he was elected as a District Council member in Ekeren with 208 votes and took office on 6 January 2025, becoming the youngest council member of Ekeren at that moment.

He is a member of the N-VA Youth Wing at the University of Antwerp (Jong N-VA StuAnt) and has represented it in multiple political debates organised at the university.

Claessens is also a member of the Catholic Flemish Student Association in Antwerp.

== Political views ==
As a local politician, Claessens prioritizes the continued creation of bicycle paths, building new playgrounds, maintenance of local parks, sport infrastructure, youth, elderly care and cultural heritage, the last being a personal interest of his.

Claessens wrote in the Flemish newspaper Doorbraak: "Every society that gives up freedom for a promise of security, carries the risk to lose both."

In the district council, Claessens submitted an interpellation towards Annemie Plompen asking how residents could sign in on the caregiver allowance that was introduced in the beginning of February.

== Personal life ==
Apart from politics and history, Claessens enjoys music. He received a diploma for the classical piano at the Music Academy of Ekeren. He is also a long-time judo enthusiast, having practiced the sport since his childhood.
