= Deelgemeente =

Type of administrative division in Belgium and the Netherlands

A deelgemeente (Dutch pronunciation: [ˈdeːlɣəˌmeːntə], literally sub-municipality), or section (French pronunciation: [sɛksjɔ̃]), is a subdivision of a municipality in Belgium and, until March 2014, in the Netherlands as well.

== Belgium ==
Each municipality in Belgium that existed as a separate entity on 1 January 1961 but no longer existed as such after 1 January 1977 as the result of a merger is considered a section or deelgemeente within most municipalities. In addition, the City of Brussels is also divided in four sections that correspond to the communes that existed before their merger in 1921.

The term deelgemeente is used in Dutch and the term section in French to refer to such a subdivision of a municipality anywhere in Belgium, municipalities having been merged throughout the country in the 1970s. Beforehand, sections or deelgemeenten usually were independent municipalities before the fusions in the 1970s. In French, the term section is sometimes confused with commune (for municipality), especially in larger cities like Charleroi and Mons as the sections composing the municipality used to be individual communes before the 1970s. It is therefore not rare to hear that Mons comprises "19 communes" when in fact Mons is a single municipality (commune) divided into 19 sections. In addition, there is the term ancienne commune (former municipality), which has no official status.

A section or deelgemeente does not bear any administrative powers. However, the Belgian Constitution provides the possibility of implementing districts for any municipality with at least 100,000 inhabitants, giving de facto political and administrative jurisdiction to the sections. Only the municipality of Antwerp has implemented ten districts, Belgium's lowest level of administration.

== Netherlands ==
In the Netherlands, deelgemeenten were administrative divisions that could be instituted by any municipality. The city of Amsterdam was the first to do this. In the early 1980s, the municipality was divided into fifteen deelgemeenten. This number was decreased to eight in 2010. Seven of these were officially called stadsdeel.

Rotterdam followed in the 1990s and was divided into fourteen deelgemeenten. Deelgemeenten had their own mayor, the deelgemeentevoorzitter, their own aldermen, deelgemeentewethouders, and their own elected assembly, the deelgemeenteraad. Deelgemeenten were abolished in March 2014, after the 2014 municipal elections. Since 2014, districts of Amsterdam have a bestuurscommissie (literally "governance commission"), and the deelgemeenten of Rotterdam are now called gebieden (literally "areas").
