= Berendrecht =

- Neighbourhood
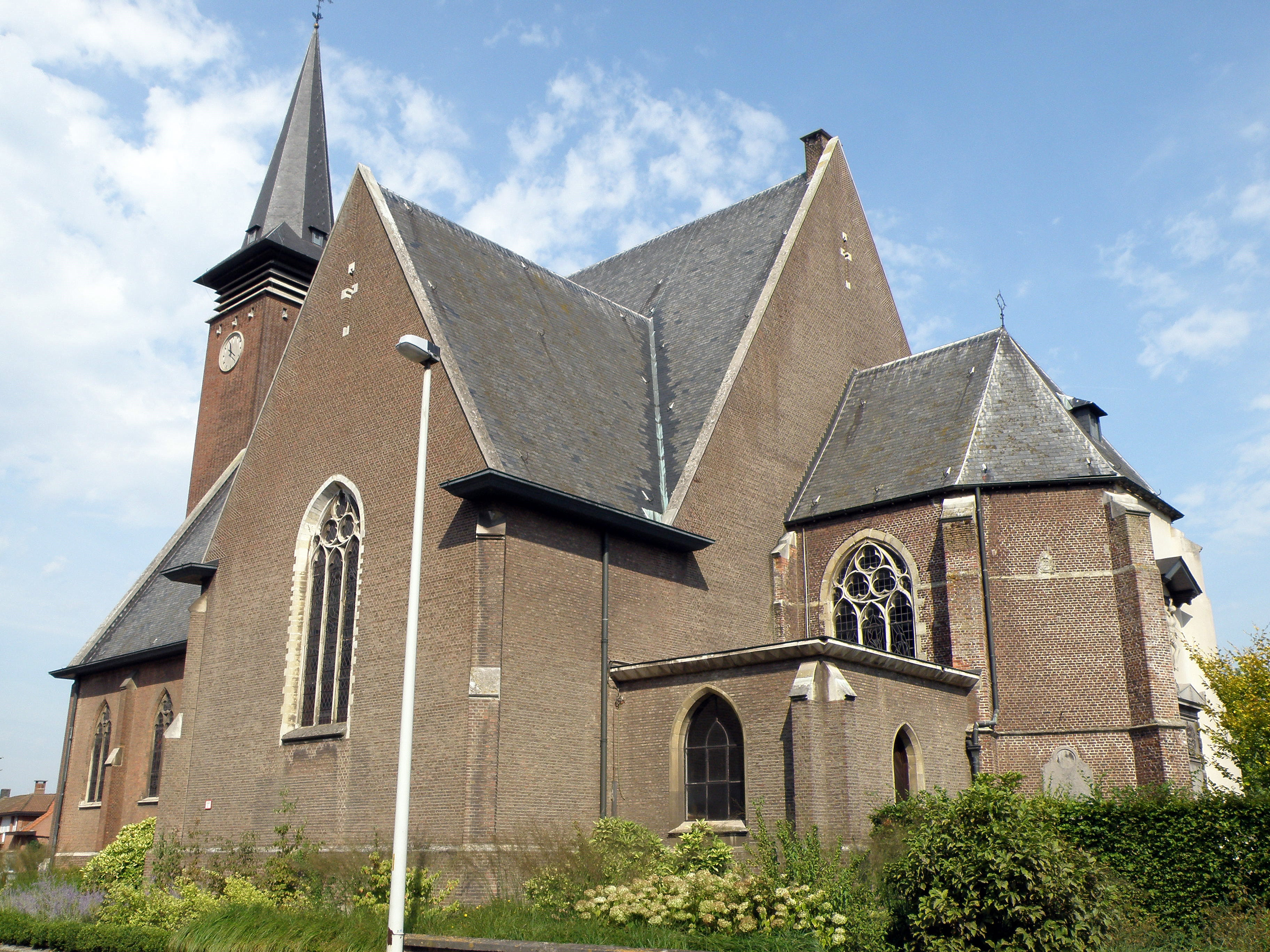
- Church of Berendrecht

- Location in Belgium
- Country: Belgium
- Region: Flemish Region
- Province: Antwerp
- Municipality: Antwerp

Area
  - Total: 10.25 km^{2} (3.96 sq mi)

Population (2021)
  - Total: 6,059
  - Density: 591.1/km^{2} (1,531/sq mi)
- Time zone: CET

Berendrecht (Dutch pronunciation: [ˈbeːrə(n)drɛxt]) is a neighbourhood and former village in Antwerp province in Belgium. Its name means "dike of the bear", according to the area's dialect, or "dike of a man called Bear", or "passage by the marsh". But drecht or tricht means "ferry" or "crossing" (from Latin trajectus), and ber or bere in Indo-European means "dam", "defence against water" (compare Slavic East Germany): the resulting meaning is "river crossing at a dam".

The Berendrecht Lock is the world's largest lock, giving entrance to the Port of Antwerp.

== History ==
Berendrecht is an old parish which was already referred to in 1184 and in 1212 as a property of Godfried van Schoten, lord of Breda. The history of Berendrecht will always remain closely linked with the fight against water. For many years dike builders has fought with primitive resources to protect the inhabitants against the violence of water. The village was overflowed repeatedly and devastated partially, among other things during the 13th, 14th, 16th and 17th century. In 1328 Berendrecht was devoured by water, and was moved to higher land which was ceded by the municipality Zandvliet. The village was flooded again in February 1953, hopefully for the last time. The village suffered much from foreign armies and lay often in the direct line of fire during the fight between the northern Netherlands and the Spaniards. Both of these warring parties frequently used the tactic of strategic flooding to attack Fort Lillo, and the fort De Frederik which in the meantime disappeared, and the reinforced blockhouse Zandvliet to force dispossession. The population was subject to the always changing warring parties for foreign armies. In the 15th centuries the Monnikenhof was founded, a dwelling with courtyards and ponds, splendid for that time. It belonged to the abbots and lords of the Sint-Michielsabdij of Antwerp. The Monnikenhof was located at the current district of Viswater. In 1958, Berendrecht and Zandvliet and Lillo were joined at Antwerp and the polder landscape was mainly expropriated for the port extension.
