= George Morren =

- Born: George Morren; 20 July 1868; Ekeren, Belgium
- Died: 21 November 1941 (aged 73); Brussels, Belgium
- Known for: Painting
- Notable work: Sunday Afternoon
- Movement: Post-Impressionism, neo-impressionism, Pointillism

George Morren or Georges Morren (20 July 1868 – 21 November 1941†) was a Belgian painter, sculptor, Impressionist and engraver.

== Career ==
George Morren, third child of Anna Henrica Van den Wouwer, and Arthur Morren, a wealthy merchant of grain in Antwerp, was born in Ekeren, the northern district of Antwerp, during the reign of King Leopold II. He grew up in a bourgeois and Francophile family. His upbringing included an artistic education. The painter and friend of the family Emile Claus who taught him and his brothers several times a week served as his first mentor. In 1888 Claus convinced Arthur Morren to enter his son at the Artesis Hogeschool Antwerpen but he left after a short time, disliking the conformist teaching methods.

In 1888, he moved to Paris, where he frequented the studios of Alfred Roll, Pierre Puvis de Chavannes and Eugène Carrière. He began working in an Impressionist style. In 1889 Morren was acquainted with Henry van de Velde. Thanks to van de Velde, he attended the trade fairs in Brussels, the exhibitions of the Société des Vingt, the art exhibitions of the freelance painters in Paris (Third French Republic) and the Belgian and foreign artists of the Avantgarde. Under the influence of Henry van de Velde, Morren made some works between 1890 and 1892, featuring closely and regularly spaced dots of contrasting color, conforming to pointillist theories of the French painter Georges Seurat.

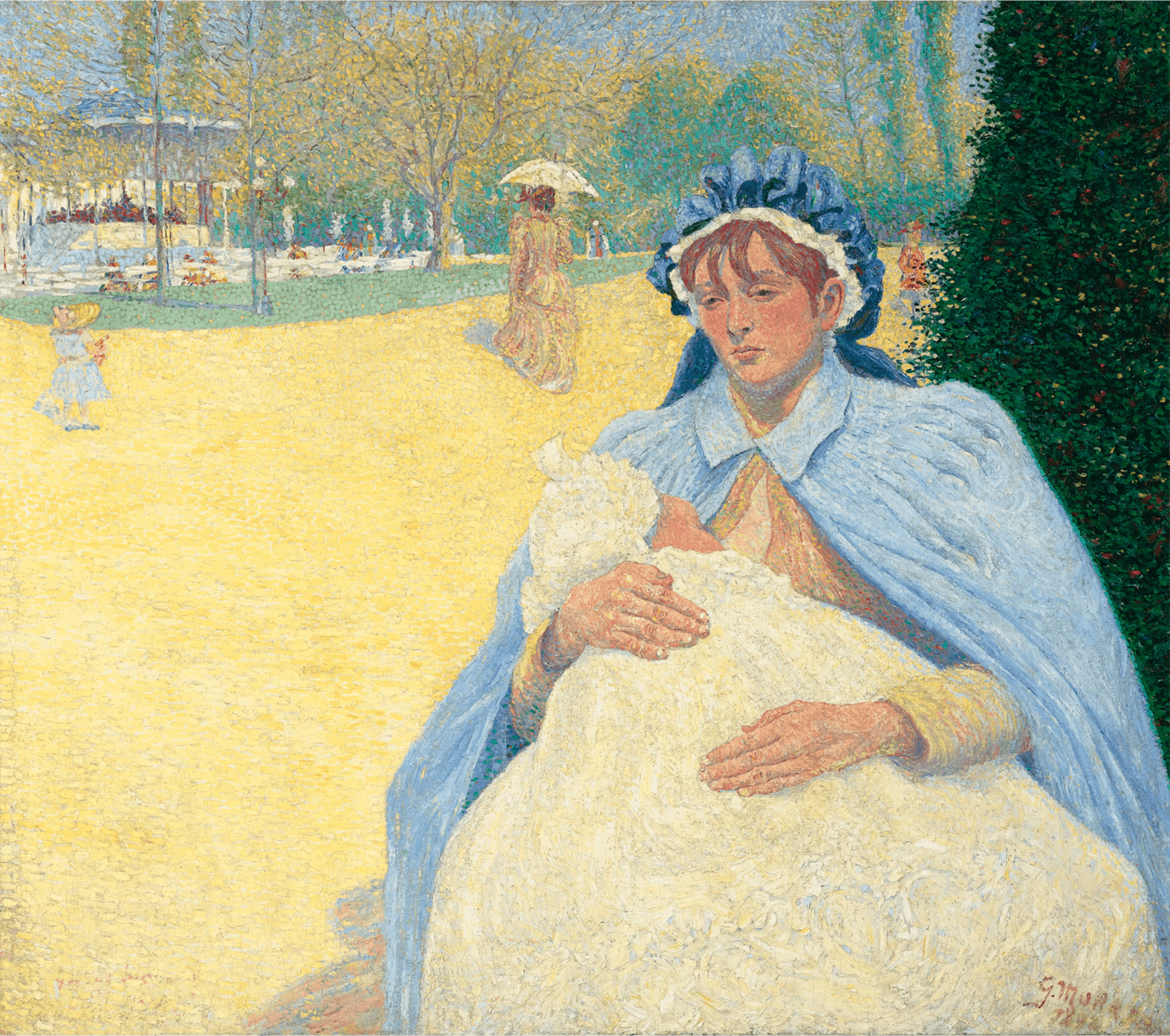
Le Renouveau (1892)

In the summer of 1892, eschewing the shortened painting process which was associated with Neo-Impressionism, he began to work in a more spontaneous manner, creating more space for emotions. Influenced by the ideas of the United Kingdom of Great Britain and Ireland painters William Morris and Walter Crane, both advocates of applied art, he took part between 1893 and 1900 in the creation of jewelry, articles of daily use, wallpaper, etc. During this time, he also completed his artistic training in Paris. He was active in the Atelier of French painters Alfred Philippe Roll, Eugène Carrière, Pierre Puvis de Chavannes and Henri Gervex. He became one of the most eager admirers of the French Impressionists. After three years in Paris he returned to Antwerp where he participated in several avant-garde groups, particularly Als ik Kan, L’Association pour l’Art, La Libre Esthétique and Eenigen. In the latter he was a founder-member in 1902. Morren created light-flooded paintings, exhibited at the fairs La Libre Esthétique in Brussels, the 'Vie et Lumière', and at numerous international exhibitions between 1895 and 1913. Contributing to Luminism he reached the summit of his second major artistic period between 1904 and 1907 ( Le mois des roses et L'été ) which ended on the eve of the World War I.

In 1897 he married Juliette Melges. The couple lived in Antwerp for ten years before moving to Brussels in 1910. He also acquired a property in France, near the town Saint-Germain-en-Laye. It was in this idyllic environment, not far from the estates of the French painters Maurice Denis, Pierre Bonnard and Édouard Vuillard whom he visited several times where he spent most of his time. Towards 1913, he entered a new creative period. The colors in his new works were more subdued. He used grated rough pigment and pastels. Morren remained faithful to impressionist ideals and did not participate in new trends, such as Cubism or Expressionism. He dealt with scenes of everyday life ('La pergola', 1929), interiors, still lifes ( Pivoines , 1919), landscapes and portraits. His palette became darker and his paintings developed a solemnity and clarity of expression ('Le sommeil', 1922).

He returned to Belgium in 1926 exhibiting works from his entire creative period in the Galerie Georges Giroux in Brussels. The press unanimously praised the retrospective but it drew less attention from the public. In 1931 a new retrospective took place at the Palais des Beaux-Arts de Bruxelles. This time the exhibition was a great success and attracted a wide audience.

In a letter of 1934 he wrote that he had destroyed or altered some of his earlier works. In his last creative period ( période de synthèse ) he turned to a smooth painting style. The lacquer layer used is thin and distributed over a large area similar to a watercolor. If some form of Impressionism occasionally appeared in the landscapes, it showed less glimmer. Color was increasingly used independently of the play of light and shadows disappeared. More emphasis was placed on the aesthetics of the transient with constantly changing color variations ( Le bâton de rouge , 1941).

In 1936 his wife died. A year later, he married Orpha Demets (born November 1911). George Morren died in his home in Brussels on 21 November 1941 during his preparation for a new retrospective at the Palace of Fine Arts in Brussels. This took place in April 1942. It was overshadowed by the German occupation during the Second World War.

== Works (selection) ==
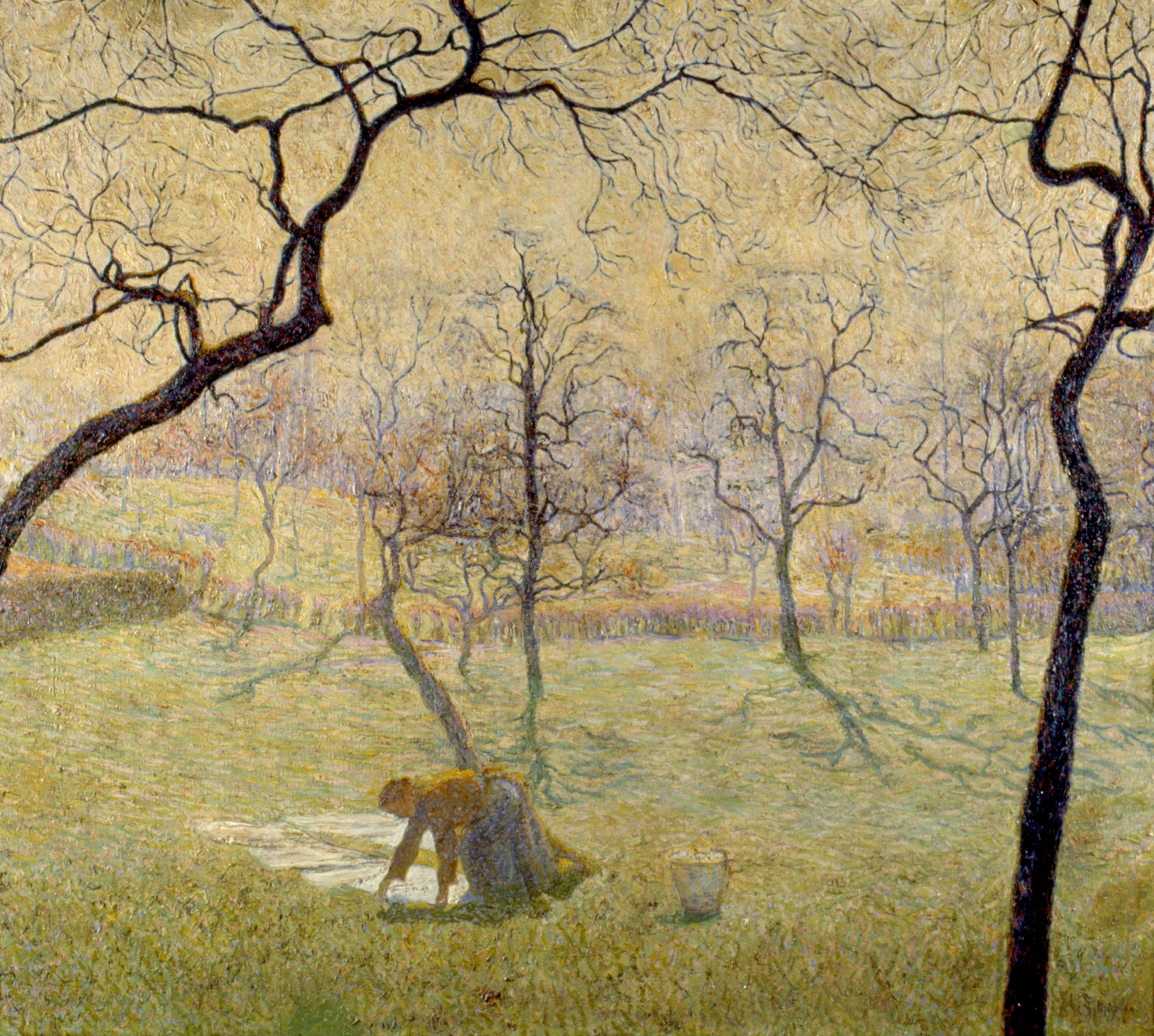
Corando a Roupa, (1894)

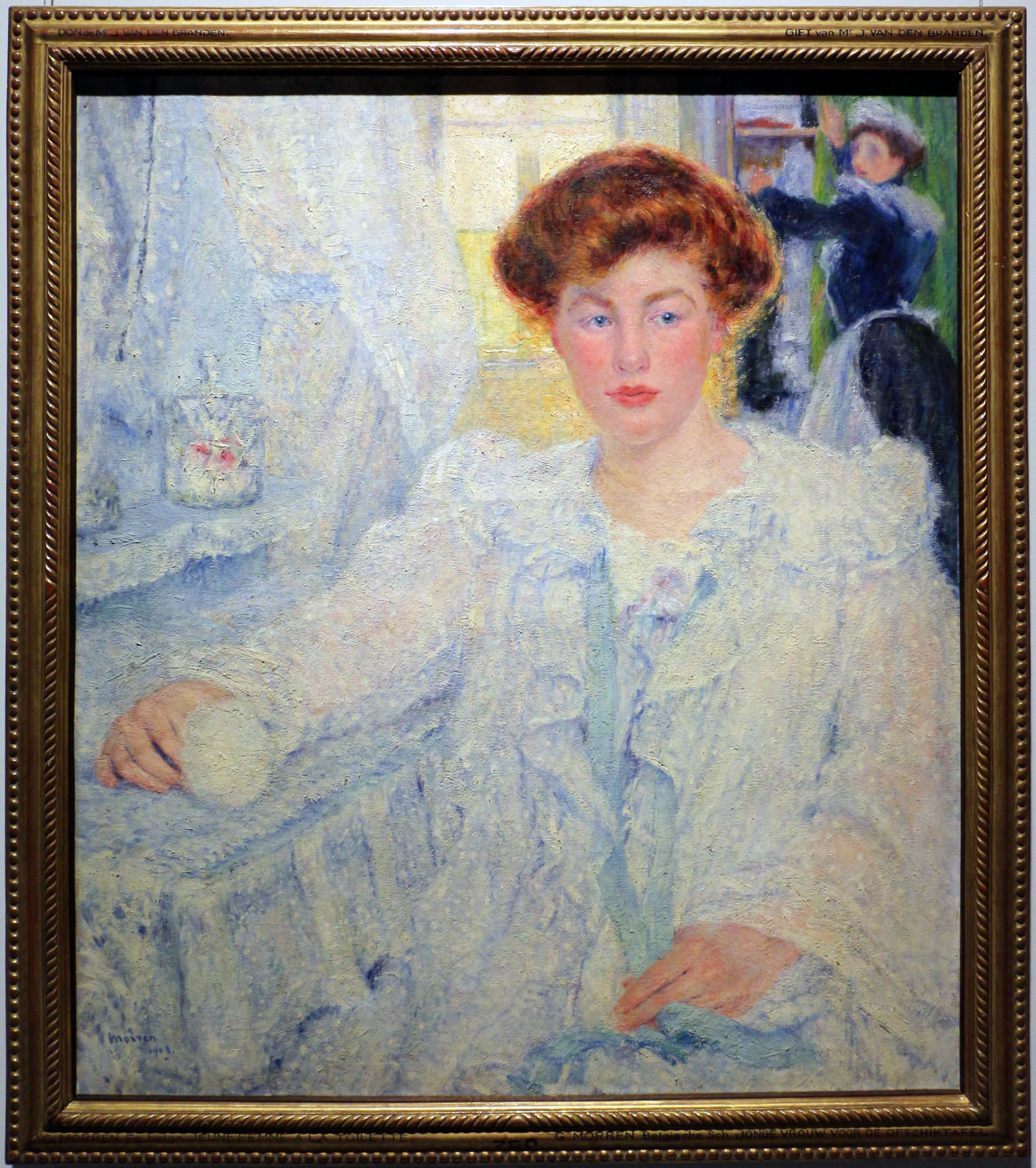
La jeune femme à sa toilette, (1903), Royal Museums of Fine Arts of Belgium

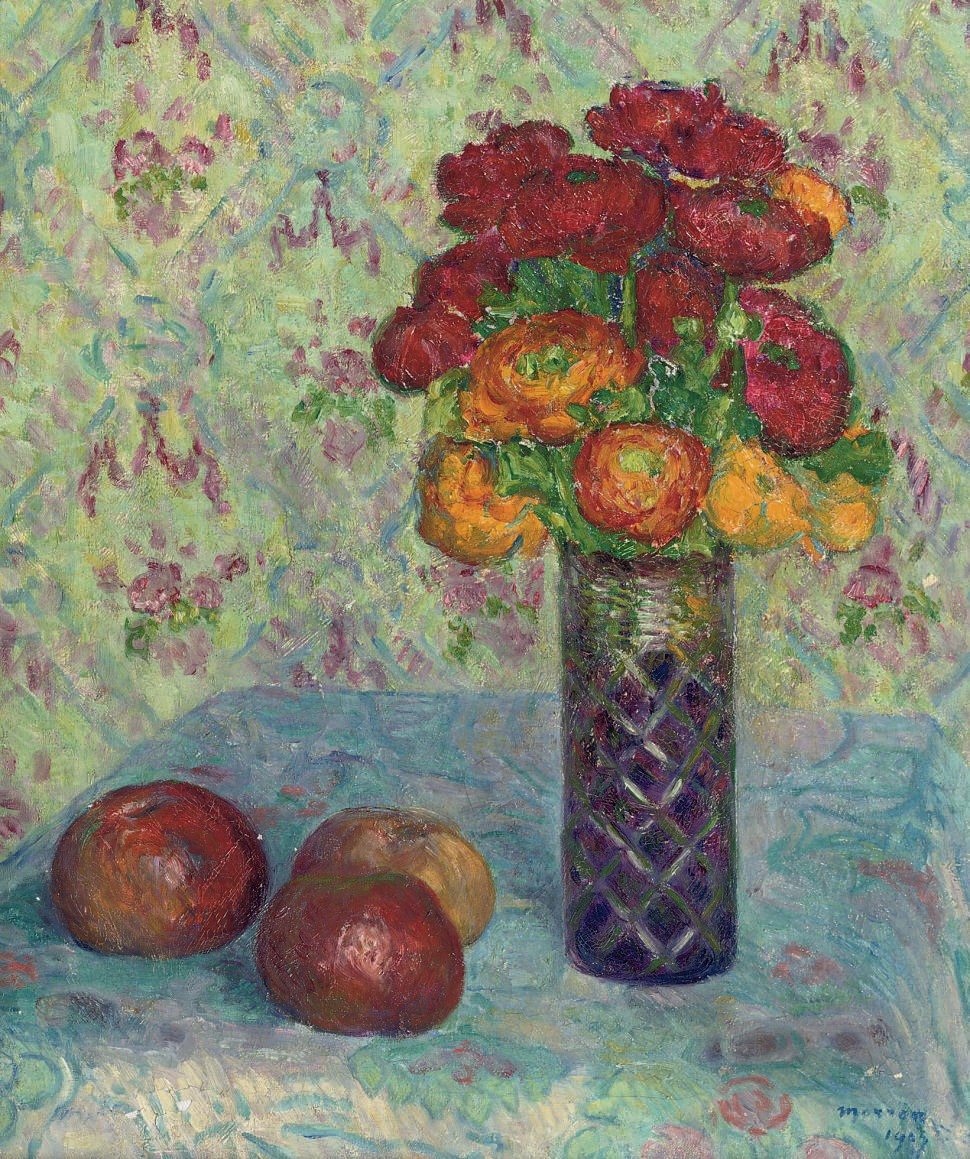
Renoncules, (1907)

== Paintings ==
- Le Renouveau, 1892
- Les perches à haricots, 1892
- Sunday Afternoon, 1892
- Corando a Roupa, 1894
- La jeune femme à sa toilette, 1903
- Le mois des roses et L'été, 1904–1907
- Renoncules, 1907
- Rue de village, 1914
- Le Pâton de rouge, 1941
- Le bâton de rouge, 1941
- Le Basin de N.
- A still life of a vase of summer flowers, a teapot
