= Statue of Leopold II of Belgium, Ekeren =

Statue in Belgium

Statue of Leopold II of Belgium
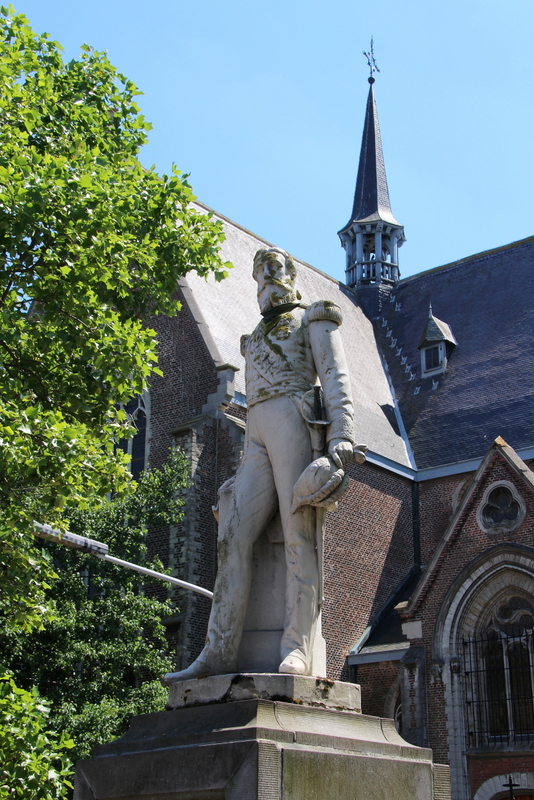
- The statue in 2017
- Artist: Joseph Ducaju
- Year: 1873
- Medium: Sandstone sculpture
- Location: Ekeren, Belgium

A statue of King Leopold II of the Belgians was installed in Ekeren, Flanders, Belgium, until 2020. The statue was designed by Belgian sculptor Joseph Ducaju, made of sandstone from Bad Bentheim, and was erected in 1873, eight years into Leopold's reign, as the first statue to commemorate him as king.

After damage sustained during the George Floyd protests, the statue was removed to the grounds of the Middelheim Open Air Sculpture Museum in Antwerp on 9 June, although it may be irreparably damaged.

== See also ==
- Bust of Leopold II of Belgium, Ghent
- King Leopold II statue (Ostend)
- List of monuments and memorials removed during the George Floyd protests
- List of statues of Leopold II of Belgium
