= List of statues of Leopold II of Belgium =

This is a list of statues and monuments of Leopold II of Belgium (9 April 1835 – 17 December 1909), the second King of the Belgians from 1865 to 1909 and, through his own initiative, the owner and absolute ruler of the Congo Free State from 1885 to 1908.

== Statues in Belgium ==
Several statues have been erected to honour the legacy of Leopold II in Belgium. According to Professor of Colonial History Idesbald Goddeeris of Leuven University (2018), most of the statues date from the interwar period, the peak of colonial-patriotic propaganda. The monuments were supposed to help get rid of the scandal after international commotion about the atrocities in the Congo Free State during Leopold II's rule, and to raise people's enthusiasm for the colonial enterprise in Belgian Congo.

His controversial regime in the Congo Free State has motivated proposals for these statues to be removed. During the international George Floyd protests against racism (May–July 2020), several statues of Leopold II were vandalised, while several petitions that called for the removal of some or all statues were signed by tens of thousands of Belgians. Other petitions, also signed by tens of thousands, called for the statues to remain.

In early June 2020, a majority in the Brussels Parliament requested a committee to be set up to 'decolonise the public sphere' in the Brussels-Capital Region. From 9 June 2020 onwards, authorities in Belgium gave way to public pressure and began removing some of the statues of Leopold, beginning with ones in Ekeren in the municipality of Antwerp and in the Waracqué Faculty of Economics and Management of the University of Mons on that day. On 30 June 2020, the 60th anniversary of the Democratic Republic of the Congo's independence, King Philippe released a statement expressing his "deepest regret" for the wounds of the colonial past, and the "acts of violence and cruelty committed" in the Congo during colonisation, but did not explicitly mention Leopold's role in the atrocities. Some activists accused him of not making a full apology.

Busts, statues, memorials and monuments of Leopold II in Belgium: Brussels Capital Region; Flanders; Wallonia
Picture	Description	Province	Erected	Removed	Historical notes
Equestrian statue of Leopold II on Throne Square, vandalised in November 2018	Equestrian statue on Throne Square in Brussels	Brussels	1926	–	Main article: Equestrian Statue of Leopold II, Brussels The statue has been vandalised several times, including with red paint by Théophile de Giraud in 2008, again with red paint in 2018, with white paint in November 2019, and again in June 2020. A 14-year-old named Noah launched a petition for its removal in early June 2020 that was signed over 45,000 times within several days. A majority in the Brussels Parliament wants to either recontextualise or remove all Leopold II statues in Brussels, including this one.
	Standing statue in King's Garden in Ixelles	Brussels	1969	–	A majority in the Brussels Parliament wants to either recontextualise or remove all Leopold II statues in Brussels, including this one in Ixelles/Elsene.
	Monument at Prince Avenue in Auderghem	Brussels	1930	2020	This monument on Prince Square (French: Square du Souverain) at the Prince Avenue (Dutch: Vorstlaan, French: Boulevard du Souverain) featured a bust of Leopold II, surrounded by several other stone art works and a bilingual plaque. The bust was vandalised and knocked down, and subsequently removed by the municipality for restoration on 12 June 2020. Mayor Didier Gosuin (DéFI) condemned the toppling, saying that although a 'recontextualisation of colonial heritage' was a good cause, this should happen democratically in consultation with others. A few days earlier, the municipality had already erased part of the plaque's text which thanked 'those who brought civilisation to Congo'.
	Equestrian statue in the Cinquantenaire Museum	Brussels		–	This equestrian statue was created by Thomas Vinçotte (1850–1925). It is located in the Cinquantenaire Museum in the City of Brussels.
	To the Belgian Pioneers in the Congo	Brussels	1921	–	This stone monument was designed by Thomas Vinçotte and crafted between 1911 and 1921 to commemorate the Congo Free State. In particular, it honours the Belgian 'pioneers' (soldiers) who 'brought civilisation' to the Congo, especially through the Congo–Arab War (1892–1894) that sought to conquer present-day East Congo, and illustrates the Belgian raids against the Arab slave traders there. The monument does not portray Leopold II himself, but prominently features a bilingual quote to justify the colonial project: I have undertaken the work of the Congo in the interest of civilisation and for the well-being of Belgium. Leopold II 3 June 1906.
	Bust in Duden Park in Forest	Brussels	1957	–	This bronze bust on blue stone was created by Thomas Vinçotte (1850–1925), probably at the request of King Albert I, but not inaugurated in Duden Park (Forest, Brussels) until 11 May 1957. The base features a bilingual inscription saying "Leopold II Benefactor of Public Parks". A majority in the Brussels Parliament wants to either recontextualise or remove all Leopold II statues in Brussels, including this one.
	Bust in Royal Greenhouses of Laeken	Brussels		–	This bust was created by Thomas Vinçotte (1850–1925). The Royal Greenhouses of Laeken were expanded on the orders of Leopold II, funded by his profits from the Congo Free State, and filled with Congolese vegetation to celebrate his colonial project.
	Equestrian statue in the Royal Galleries of Ostend	West Flanders	1931	–	Main article: Equestrian Statue of Leopold II, Ostend In 2004, an activist group, De Stoete Ostendenoare, symbolically cut off a bronze hand from one of the kneeling Congolese slaves who, as part of the Gratitude of the Congolese group in the monument, honours Leopold II. This was a reference to how Congolese slaves' hands were cut off if they did not produce enough rubber during Leopold's colonial regime. The activists were willing to give the hand back if a historically correct sign would be placed near the statue. The statue was vandalised again in 2020.
	Bust on Prinses Clementinaplein in Ostend	West Flanders	1987	–	This bust was defaced with red paint in November 2008 by activist group De Stoete Ostenenoare, and in 2017 there was an attempt to cut Leopold II's nose. The city council has refused to remove it, but favours talks with inhabitants on whether to erect a "counter-statue" that condemns colonialism in order to create 'balance'. Mayor Bart Tommelein (Open VLD) has been negotiating with organisation Belgian Youth Against Racism.
	Bust in King Albertpark (Zuidpark) in Ghent	East Flanders	1928	2020	Main article: Bust of Leopold II of Belgium, Ghent This statue was vandalised in October and November 2018 and in July 2019, while activists demanded it be removed, along with all references to Leopold II, such as street names. The city council initially placed a sign near the statue that read: 'The city council regrets the many Congolese victims that have perished during the Free State.' The bust was defaced with red paint again on 12 June 2020, and on 18 June the Ghent municipal board decided to remove it on 30 June 2020, the 60th anniversary of Congolese independence, which it was. After several speeches, the bust was ceremonially removed amid applause. Mayor Mathias De Clercq (Open VLD): 'This neither erases history nor the underlying problems, there's still lots of work to do. But this is an important first step for our city and compatriots to stop the glorification, and move forward in a sober way.' The bust will possibly be moved to the Ghent City Museum (STAM).
	Monument on Kolonel Dusartplein in Hasselt	Limburg	1984	–	The monument's inscription states: 'Homage to HM King Leopold II and to ALL his Limburgian assistants'. It features a bust of Leopold II and the names of soldiers from Limburg who died in the Congo Free State. It was vandalised as part of the George Floyd protests in 2020, but the red paint was cleaned up. In 2018, the city council added an information sign next to it for historical context. The current council is still considering its future, with mayor Steven Vandeput (N-VA) arguing the present situation has a better educational effect than removing the monument altogether would have.
	Relief sculpture in Stadspark Sint-Truiden	Limburg	1954	–	The memorial, featuring a relief of Leopold II, pays homage to 5 of the city's 'sons, colonial pioneers, who died for the Congo Free State'. Someone attached red tears made of paper to the relief in June 2020. The city announced it will not remove the memorial, but add an information sign for context and explanation.
	Standing statue in Ekeren, municipality of Antwerp	Antwerp	1873	2020	Main article: Statue of Leopold II of Belgium, Ekeren Vandalised as part of the George Floyd protests and removed on 9 June 2020.
	Bust in Albertpark in Halle	Flemish Brabant	1953	–	An information sign was added in 2009. The statue was first defaced with graffiti on 7 June and then toppled in the night of 13–14 June 2020 as part of the George Floyd protests, but the municipality restored the bust and put it back in its place on 3 July 2020, together with a new plaque stating 'Halle will not submit to vandalism'. It further explained that on 23 June, the municipal council had voted to initiate new talks on what to do with the statue 'and other symbols that recall discriminatory practices from our colonial past' with 'all associations and interested parties involved in our city. As long as these talks have not been concluded and no definitive standpoint has been taken, any destruction will be repaired.'
	Statue on Leuven Town Hall	Flemish Brabant	1895; ~1913	2020	One of many decorative statues on Leuven Town Hall depicted Leopold II, on the southwestern tower facing the Naamsestraat. The city council's decision to remove the statue was taken at the end of June 2020 as part of a larger policy of decolonisation.
	Bust in KU Leuven's Central Library	Flemish Brabant		2020	On 10 June 2020, a Leopold II bust was removed from KU Leuven's Central Library. Rector Luc Sels stated: '[The bust] doesn't serve to explain or illustrate historical facts. It's not (currently) accompanied by any context or information. Therefore, it may be considered to do what busts usually do: glorifying a historical personality. (...) I and many others have concluded that Leopold II, although important to our country from a historical perspective, is not the kind of personality that we as the KU Leuven community want to assign such a place.'
	Bust in front of the Africa Museum in Tervuren	Flemish Brabant			Bust in front of the Africa Museum created by Thomas Vinçotte (1850–1925).
	The Congo, I presume in Tervuren Park	Flemish Brabant	1997	–	The Leopold II bust is part of the statue The Congo, I presume by Tom Frantzen. It was vandalised as part of the George Floyd protests in late June 2020. Mayor Jan Spooren (N-VA) expressed surprise because, according to him, 'this is an anti-colonial work of art'. The city council would consider a solution in early July 2020.
	Bust in Tombeek	Flemish Brabant	?	–	Bust near the entrance of the former restaurant 'Les 4 rois' (The Four Kings), Lanestraat 2 in the village of Tombeek in the municipality of Overijse.
	Monument in Arlon	Luxembourg	1951	–	This monument at the intersection of the Avenue de Luxembourg and the Avenue de Longwy features a standing statue and a quote from Leopold II: "I undertook the work of the Congo in the interest of civilisation and for the good of Belgium." In June 2020, a petition signed by more than 900 people called for the statue to be removed, perhaps moved to a museum, or a referendum to be held to decide on its fate. Mayor Vincent Magnus (cdH) said no decision had been taken yet: 'We need time to think, to listen to the citizens and the historians.'
	Standing statue near Saint Elisabeth's Church in Mons	Hainaut	1957	–	This statue is located in front of Saint Elisabeth's Church at the intersection of the Rue des Fossés and the Rue Boulengé de la Hainière in Mons. As of 30 June 2020, it has not been vandalised, and there have been no calls for it to be removed, even though a bust of Leopold II was removed by the University of Mons 500 metres away on 9 June 2020. In 2019 the city cooperated with members of the Congolese community in Belgium on a memorial for all Congolese independence fighters; this memorial was placed in the town hall of Mons.
	Bust at the University of Mons	Hainaut		2020	The bust was originally located in the entrance hall of the Warocqué Faculty for Economics and Management of University of Mons (UMons) on Warocqué Square, but due to controversy moved to a less prominent spot near the Academy Hall in the early 2000s. After Dusingize Marie-Fidèle, a student of African descent, launched a petition for its complete removal from the public sphere on 5 June 2020, it was signed thousands of times in matter of days. On 9 June 2020, the bust was removed and stored by the university.
	Standing statue on Wiertz Square in Namur	Namur	1928	–	This statue has been deliberately damaged several times, most recently in 2017. Mayor Maxime Prévôt (cdH): 'The city council has chosen to preserve this piece of heritage, no matter how painful its history. That doesn't mean that we approve of the colonial past, but to me, iconoclasm doesn't seem the right answer to the problem. We must actively combat discrimination and racism.'
	Bust on Avenue des Érables in Rixensart	Walloon Brabant	?	–	The municipality of Rixensart has refused request for comment on the bust.

== Statues in Congo ==
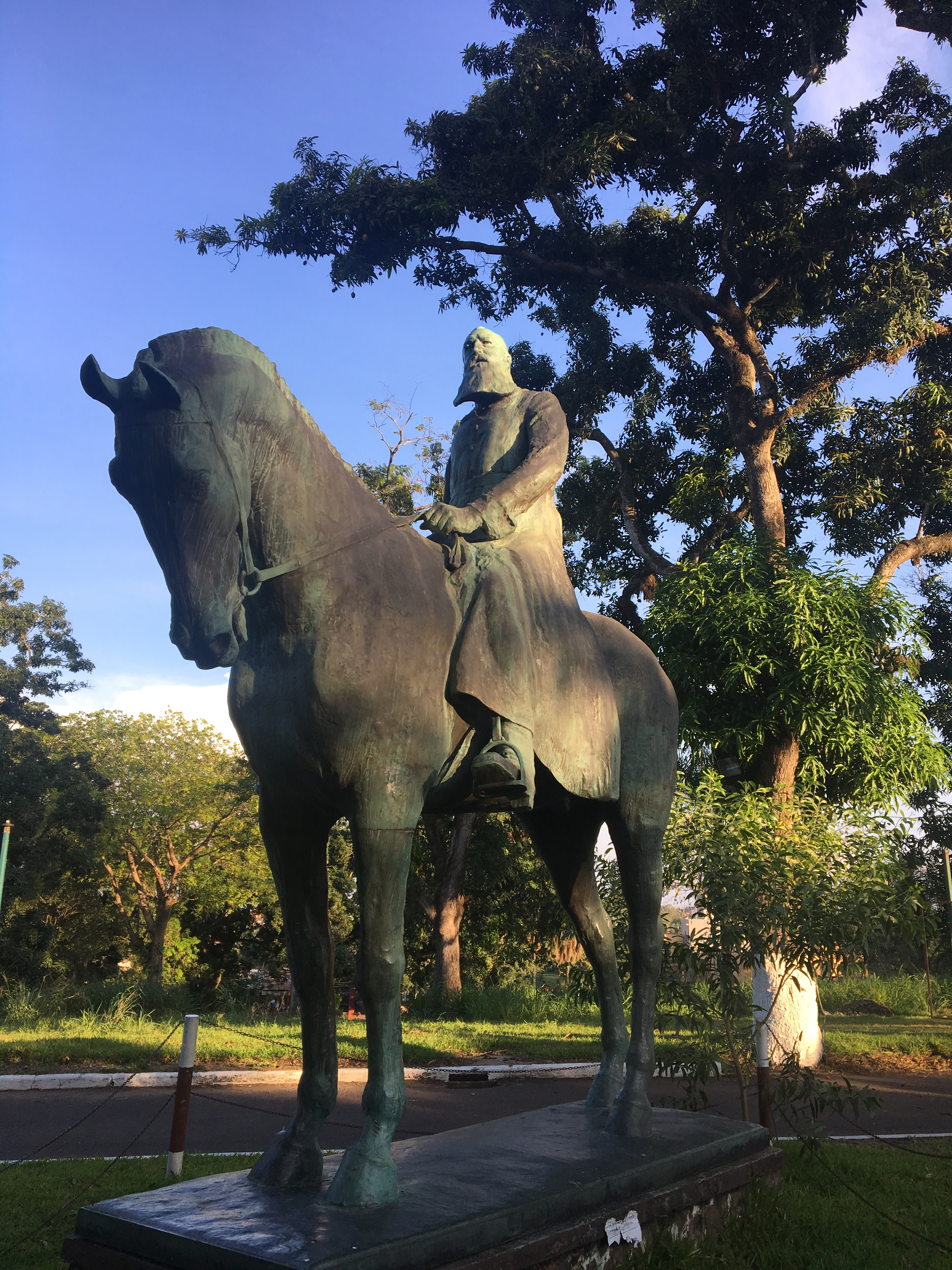
Statue in Kinshasa.

A statue of Leopold II in the DRC's capital Kinshasa (known until 1966 as Leopoldville) was removed after their independence. Congolese culture minister Christophe Muzungu decided to reinstate the statue in 2005. He claims that the beginning of the Free State had been a time of some economic and social progress. He argued that people should recognize some positive aspects of the king as well as the negative, but hours after the six-metre (20 ft) statue was installed near Kinshasa's central station, it was officially removed.

== Statues in France ==
There are two statues of Leopold II in France, both located in Saint-Jean-Cap-Ferrat, a town on the Mediterranean coast in the Alpes-Maritimes department in Southeastern France. Leopold II had bought a lot of real estate in the Cap Ferrat since 1896.

The oldest statue is a bronze medal of Leopold II embedded into a stone pier, erected in 1911. It contains the text 'A / LA MEMOIRE / DU ROI DES BELGES / LEOPOLD II / HOTE DU CAP FERRAT. QUELQUES AMIS / DE LA COTE D AZUR / 1911' ("To the memory of the King of the Belgians, Leopold II, Host of the Cap Ferrat. Some friends from the Côte d'Azur, 1911.").

The youngest is a bust of bronze, posited on a stone pier, crafted by Victor Demanet and erected on 7 February 1951. The pier contains the text "AU ROI / LEOPOLD II / LES VETERANS / DE L'ETAT / INDEPENDANT / DU CONGO. DON / A LA FRANCE ("To King Leopold II. The veterans of the Independent State of the Congo. Given to France."). The Association of Veterans of the Independent State of Congo, founded on 25 October 1928, gifted this monument to France in 1951 to honour Leopold II for their military service in the Congo Free State.

== See also ==
- George Floyd protests
- Street name controversy
