= Jules Lagae =

Belgian sculptor and medallist

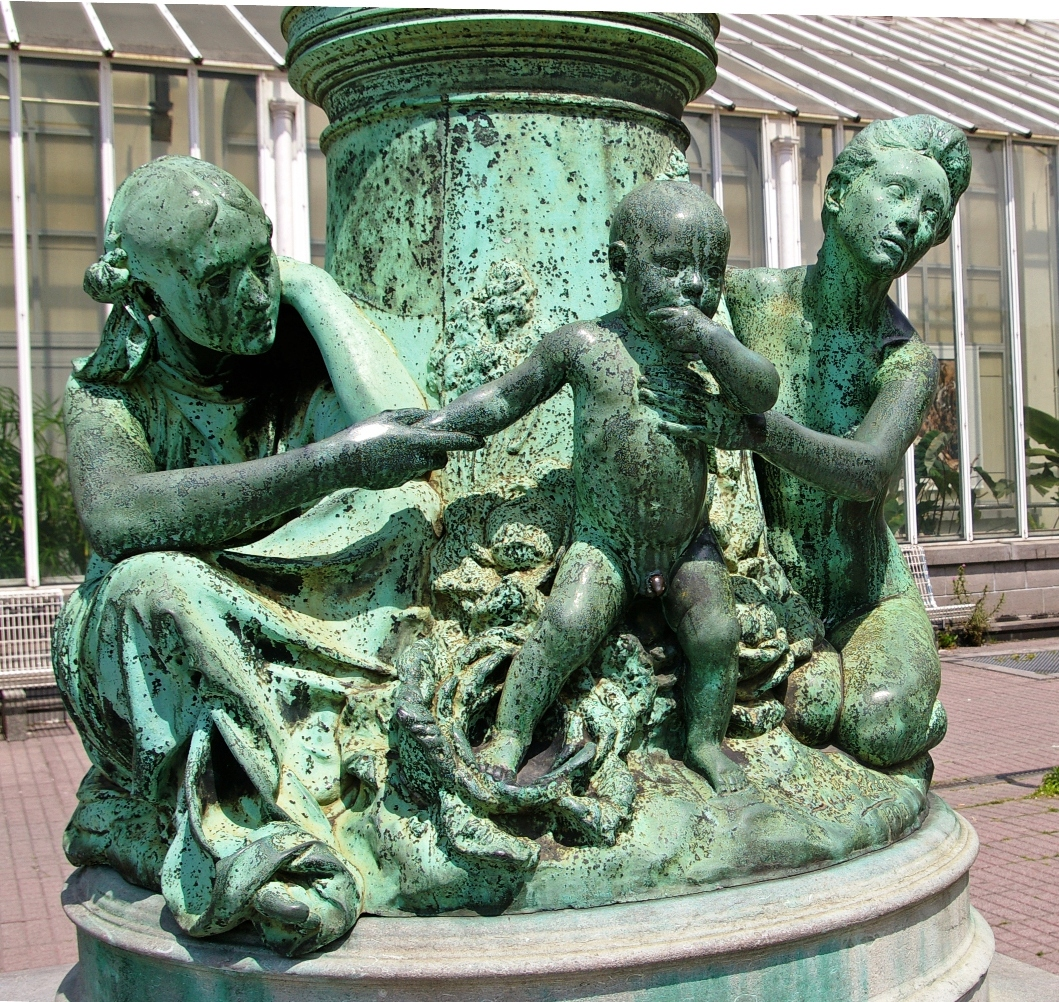
Les Quatre Âges at the Botanical Garden of Brussels

Jules Lagae (Roeselare, 15 March 1862 – Bruges, 2 June 1931) was a Belgian sculptor and medallist.

== Education ==
Jules Lagae was the son of Raymond Lagae and Pelagie Vandendorpe. The family had six children who reached adulthood and lived in the Zwanestraat, a side street of Ooststraat in Roeselare. He attended classes at the St-Michel Institution at the Minor Seminary. He came into contact with Hugo Verriest, among others. This was also the basis of his Flemish consciousness. His artistic talent was noticed early on and from the age of nine he also took lessons at the local Academy of Drawing and Architecture. At the age of fourteen he came into contact with sculptor Clément Carbon. Lagae would develop more and more as a sculptor.

In 1879 he received a first prize for his bas-relief 'Horace meets his sister Camille'. And his sculpture 'The young rider' won him a prestigious prize in the Salon in Brussels. As a result, he received grants to further develop his skills at the Royal Academy of Fine Arts in Brussels. He was taught by various masters of the time, such as Jean-Joseph Jaquet and Charles Van der Stappen. He worked also for Jef Lambeaux and Julien Dillens. It was especially Dillens who would become his great teacher. Lagae would adopt his soft realism. Their style was not overly expressive, daring or ground-breaking, but above all honest, realistic and calm. Lagae thus ended up in conservative art circles and was not spared by the progressive impressionist artists who were making their ascent at the time. Lagae would also sculpt relatively few nudes in his style, although such statues were very popular at the time.

== First Prize "Prix de Rome" sculpture ==
Lagae married the French-speaking Léonie Noulet in 1888 in Schaerbeek. In that year he also took part for the third time in the Grand Prix of Rome, an age-old competition for young artists in which the winner received a scholarship to study abroad for four years. His work from the final, 'The Sower of Good Grain' earned him the final victory. He was festively received in Roeselare and a few days later he received a tribute in the city when the tomb of Albrecht Rodenbach was unveiled. That grave is also of Lagae's hand.

The Lagae family lived abroad from 1889 to 1892, mainly in Italy. During his travels he comes under the influence of the classicist realistic style even more. He makes some well-known works there such as 'Boetelingen', which is located in Ghent and 'The abandoned one'. That statue, or a copy of it, is on the family grave of his sister in Roeselare. Lagae made various kinds of sculptures, but through his realism he became skilled in busts and medallions, among other things.

== First monuments ==
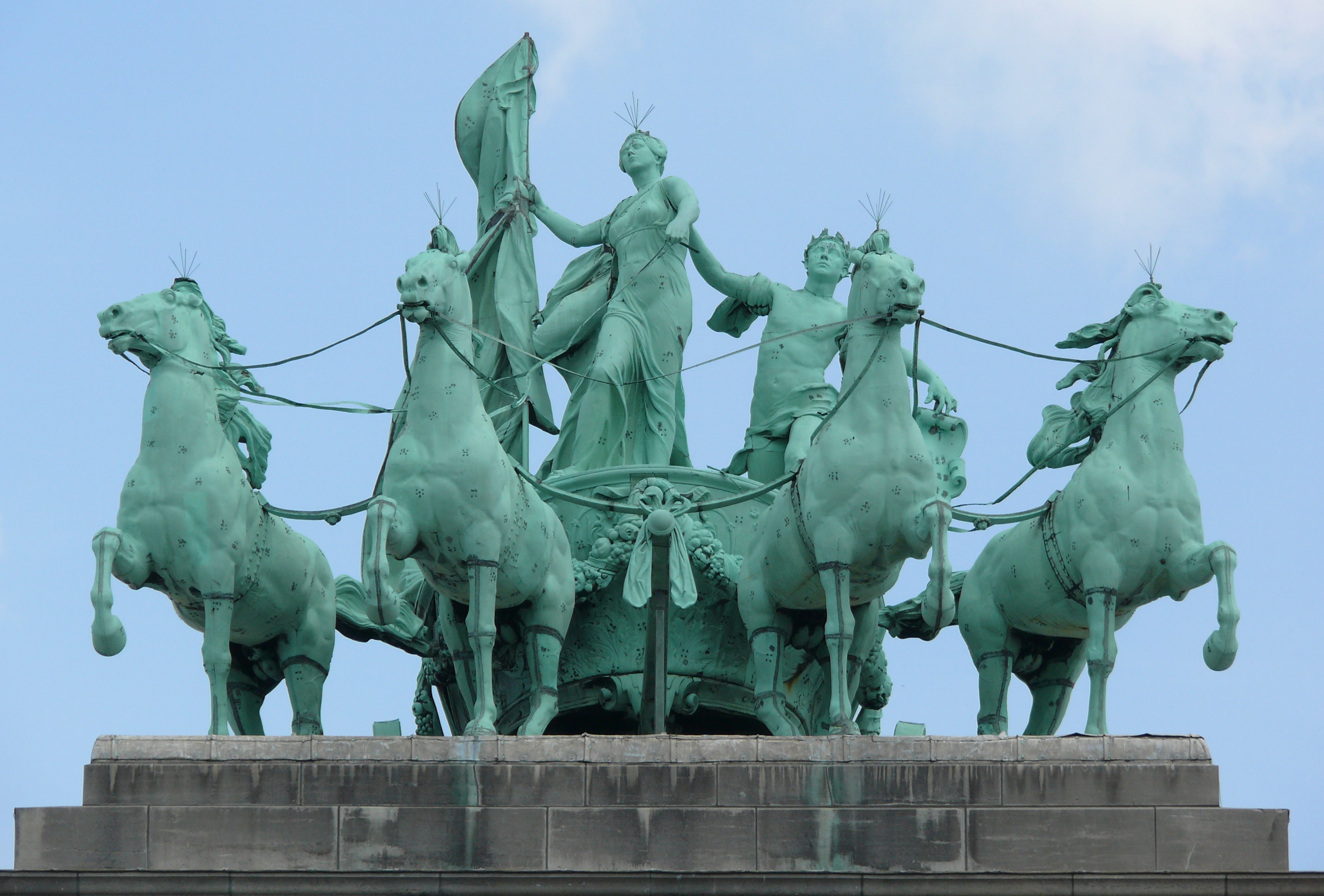
The quadriga (or Brabant Raising the National Flag) at the Parc du Cinquantenaire, Brussels, with Thomas Vinçotte, 1904–1905

One of his best-known works from his early career is undoubtedly the bust of the Flemish poet Guido Gezelle commissioned by Verriest. It is the only work of art that Gezelle had made while alive and the only model for all of Gezelle's busts. Later, Lagae would also be allowed to pour off Gezelle's death mask. In 1896 he broke through with the commission to make three monumental sculptures, one for the Botanical Garden in Brussels, a statue in Mechelen and especially the Ledeganck Monument in Eeklo. In 1900 he took part in the competition for the Golden Spurs Monument in Kortrijk. To his disappointment, he was only second. His sculpture 'Flandria' was to be placed outside in Bruges in 1987 on the Mint Square and is now called 'Maria van Burgondy'.

Other prestigious commissions followed, such as memorial monuments in Péruwelz, Charleroi, Wijgmaal and Jette. At the beginning of the 20th century, he was one of the artists who was allowed to work on the Triumphal Arch in the Cinquantenaire Park in Brussels. Together with Thomas Vinçotte he made the crown piece, the horse team with a female driver. It also earned him assignments in the city of Ostend. In 1907 he sculpted the lions at the De Smet de Naeyer bridge in Ostend.

== Argentina ==
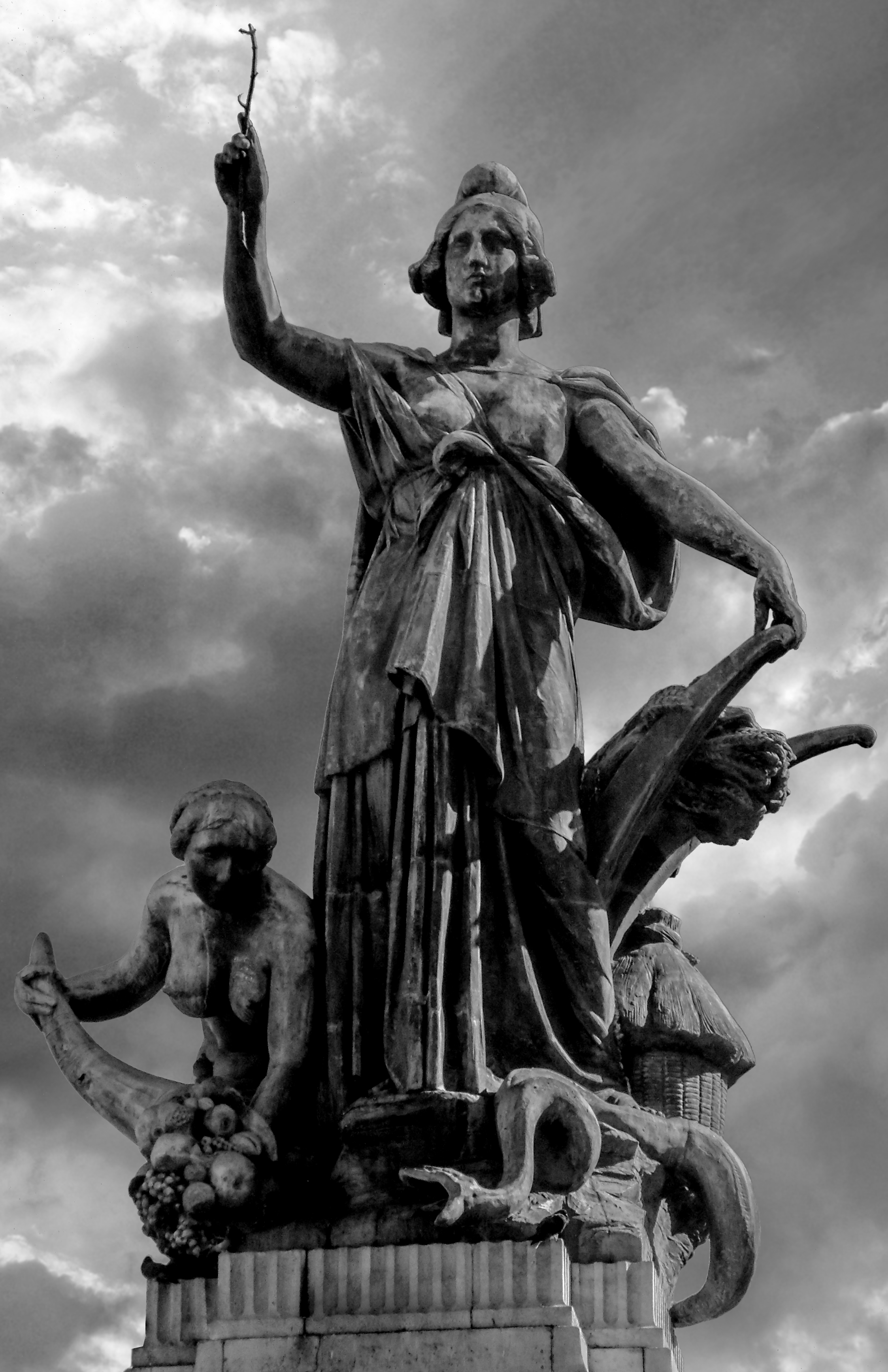
Monumento de los dos Congresos, Plaza del Congreso, Buenos Aires

The time was right for a global breakthrough. Together with architect Eugène D'Huicque, he took part in an international competition for a monumental memorial in Buenos Aires, Argentina, on the occasion of the centenary of the country's independence. Although he did not win the competition, his design was nevertheless executed as the 'Monumento de los dos Congresos'. It nearly drove Lagae to financial ruin. The monument was inaugurated on the Plaza del Congreso in 1914 and is still one of the landmarks in this city.

Lagae did not have a permanent presence in Argentina during this period. He was commissioned, among other things, to design the statue of Albrecht Rodenbach in Roeselare. Inaugurated in 1909, it is one of the few monumental statues of Lagae that contains movement. Well-known busts from that time are also those of Prince Albert, Ferdinand Callebert and Hugo Verriest. The bust of Verriest was not finished in marble until 1919, just before he died in 1920.

World War I marked Lagae. His eldest son was killed shortly before the armistice in 1918. Lagae's daughter-in-law, who had fled to France, committed shortly thereafter suicide and left a son. After the war, Lagae would design many war memorials which were related to the loss of his son. One of the best known is the monument that the Belgian government had placed in Le Havre in thanks for the city's hospitality during the war. He also made a monument to the former students of the agricultural institute in Gembloux and to the 4000 gunners who died. Both are in memory of his son.

Other monumental works were added, such as bas-reliefs for the Belgian pavilion at the World Exhibition in Rio de Janeiro in 1922-1923. He also designed the Reconstruction Monument at the foot of the new belfry of Roeselare. His son Jan modelled the face of Saint Michael. Lagae's last major work was the statue of Guido Gezelle in Bruges. To celebrate the centenary of Gezelle's birth, the city of Bruges wanted a full-length portrait of the poet. Although there were many supporters for an expressionist-cubist model, it was Lagae who won the competition for the image with his romantic-realist model. The statue was unveiled on May 1, 1930.

Jules Lagae died a year later in St John's Hospital in Bruges. He was buried in the family plot in Evere. A first biography of him was published in French in 1932 and a year later his widow organized a first retrospective of his works. In 1962, on the occasion of his hundredth birthday, a retrospective was organized in Roeselare. That year he also received a memorial monument on the Stationsplein near the 'Jules Lagaelaan', the street that received his name shortly after his death. The monument was removed during road works in 2012.

== Famous sculptures ==
- Majestic grave Albrecht Rodenbach, Roeselare, 1888
- Statue of Karel Lodewijk Ledeganck, Eeklo, 1897
- Statue of Pierre-Joseph Van Beneden, Mechelen, 1898
- Les Quatre Âges in the Botanique in Brussels, circa 1898
- Bust of Guido Gezelle at the Church of Our Lady, Kortrijk, 1903
- Allegorical images of the former post office in the Koninginnelaan of Ostend, circa 1904-1905
- Statue of Albrecht Rodenbach, Roeselare, 1909
- Statue of Guido Gezelle, Bruges, 1930
- Statue of Charles of Lorraine, Brussels, 1901
- Monument Léon Frédéric, Josaphat Park, Brussels
- Boetelingen in the Citadel Park, Ghent
- Monument aux martyrs (war memorial), Charleroi
- Statue of Mary of Burgundy (Flandria Nostra), Mint Square in Bruges
- Image of Guido Gezelle, Small Seminary Roeselare
- Haut-relief depicting Saint Michael at the foot of the belfry on the Grote Mark of Roeselare
- The Abandoned, Municipal Cemetery Roeselare
- Parents, Municipal Cemetery Roeselare and Town Hall Roeselare

== Other occupations ==
- Member of the artistic association l'Essor (1893)
- Founding member of the Société Coopérative Artistique, Brussels (1894)
- Member of the Royal Society for the Promotion of Fine Arts, Ghent (1904)
- Member of the Royal Academy of Fine Arts of Brussels (1906 - Director in 1930)
- Member of the Prussian Academy of Arts, Berlin (1906)
- Member of the jury of the Belgian Prize of Rome for Sculpture (1906)
- Member of the artistic association Kunst van Heden, Antwerp (1910)
- Corresponding member of the Royal Academy of Science, Letters and Fine Arts of Belgium (1911)
- Member of the Commission of the Musée Royal de Peinture et de Sculpture de Belgique (1911)
- Member of the Royal Academy of Science, Letters and Fine Arts of Belgium (1912)
- Member of the Royal Commission for Monuments and Sites (1912)
- Member of the Jury of the Statue of Elisabeth of Hungary, Budapest (1913)
- Member of the Société royale d'archéologie de Bruxelles (1921)
- Member of the Commission Provinciale des Beaux-Arts du Brabant (1922)
- Member of the Corps Académique, Académie Royale d'Anvers (1923)
- Vice-President of the Société des Beaux-Arts de Bruxelles (1923)
- Member of the jury of the competition for the construction of the Yser Tower (1925)

== Decorations ==
- Knight in the Order of Leopold (Belgium 1898)
- Officier de l'Instruction Publique (France 1902)
- Officer of the Order of Leopold (Belgium 1911)
- Chevalier de la Legion d'Honneur (France 1911)
- Knight in the Order of the Crown of Italy (Italy 1912)
- Officier de la Légion d'Honneur (France 1913)
- Commander in the Order of Leopold (Belgium 1923)
- Commandeur de l'Ordre de l'Etoile Noire (France 1924)

== Literature ==
- G. VAN ZYPE, Notice sur Jules Lagae, in: Annuaire de l'Académie Royale de Bruxelles, 1935, blz. 86-111.
- Lexicon van de West-Vlaamse beeldende kunstenaars, Deel 6.
- John GODDEERIS, Jules Lagae : een biografie, Jaarboek West-Vlaamse Gidsenkring, 1998
- Siegfried ANECA. Jules Lagae, een beeldhouwer uit Roeselare. Roeselare, 2012.

== Sources ==
- Online biography in Dutch
