= Plaza del Congreso =

Park in Buenos Aires, Argentina

Coordinates: 34°36′35″S 58°23′24″W

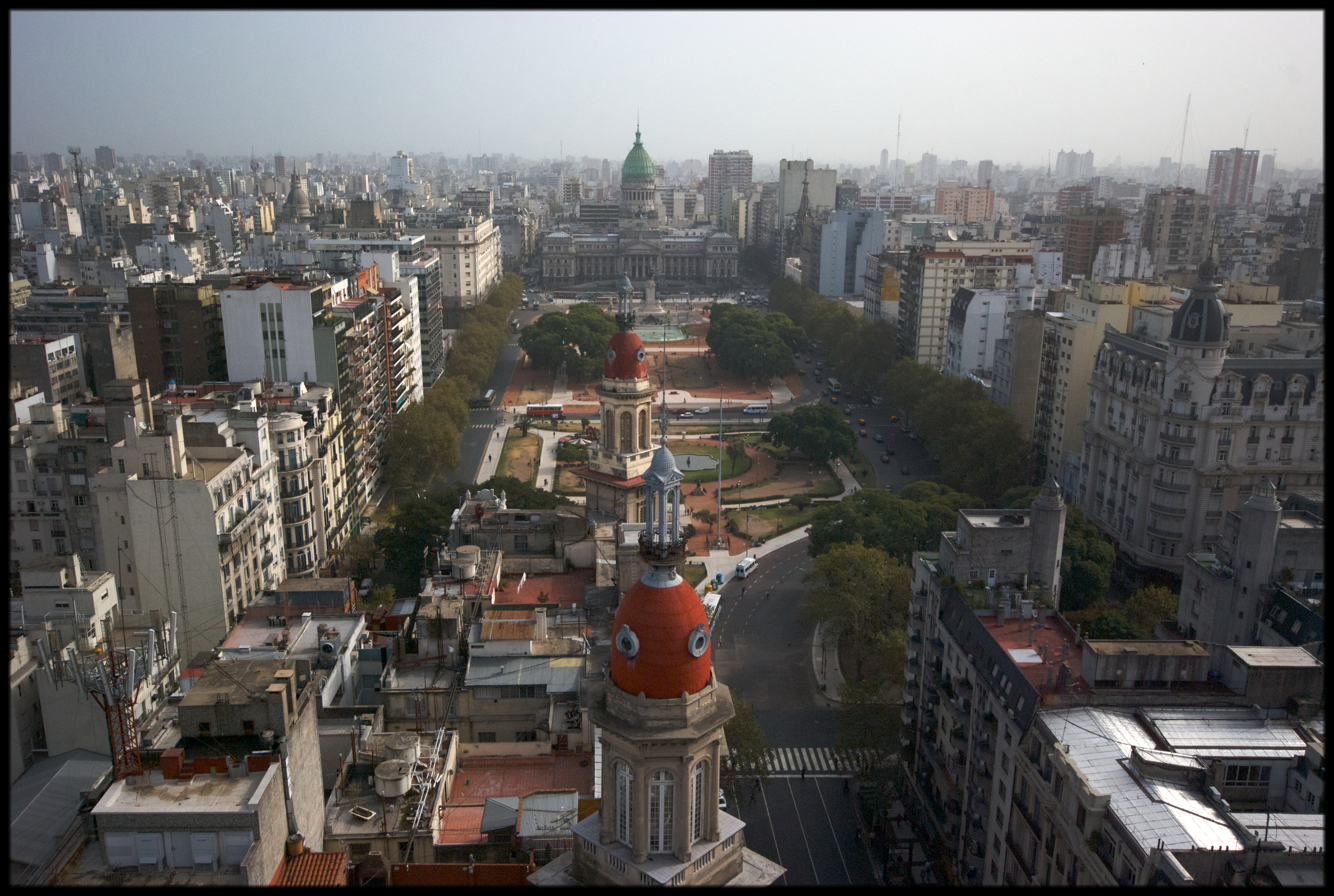
View of Congressional Plaza from the east.

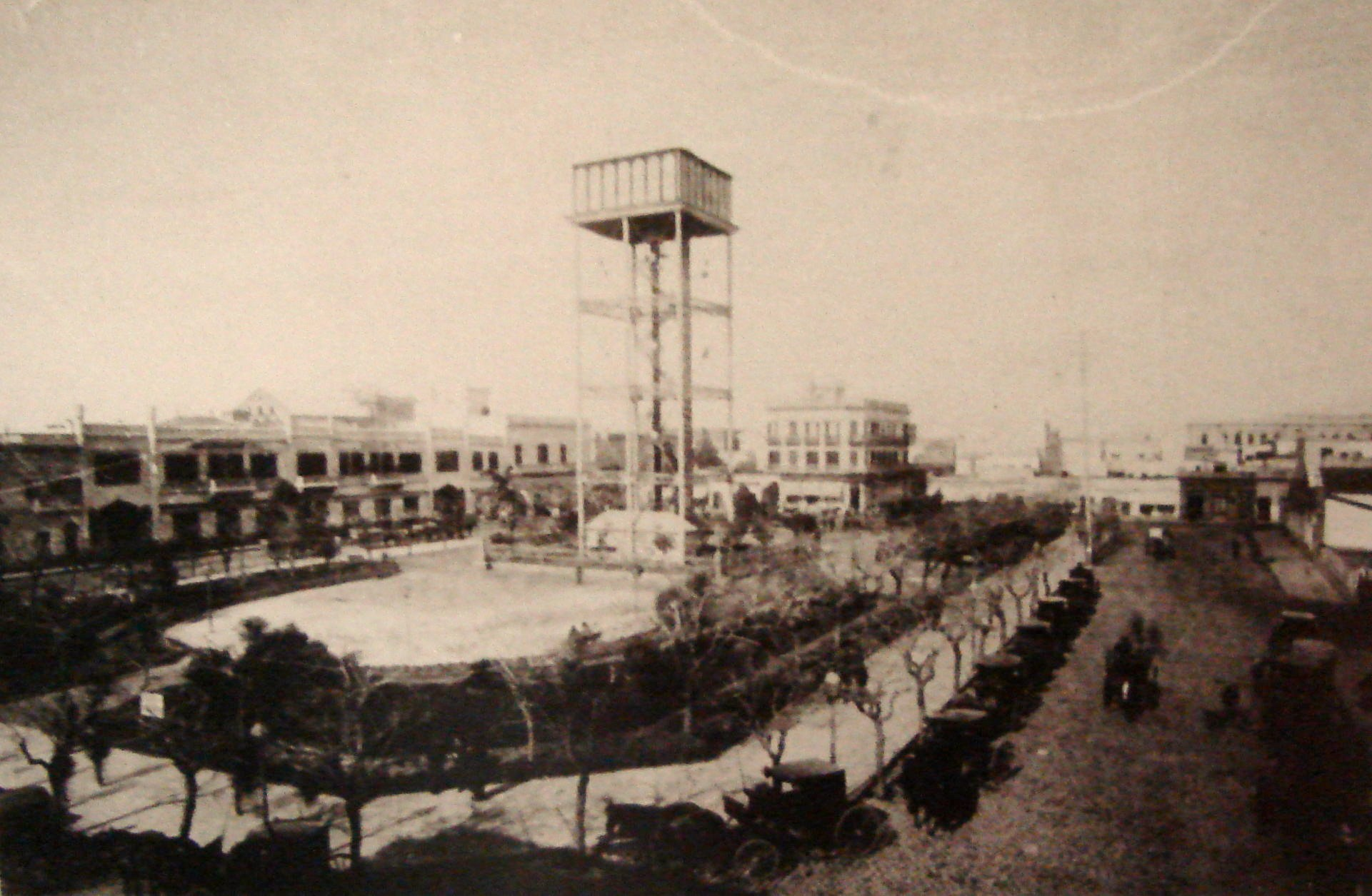
The water tower on Plaza Lorea.

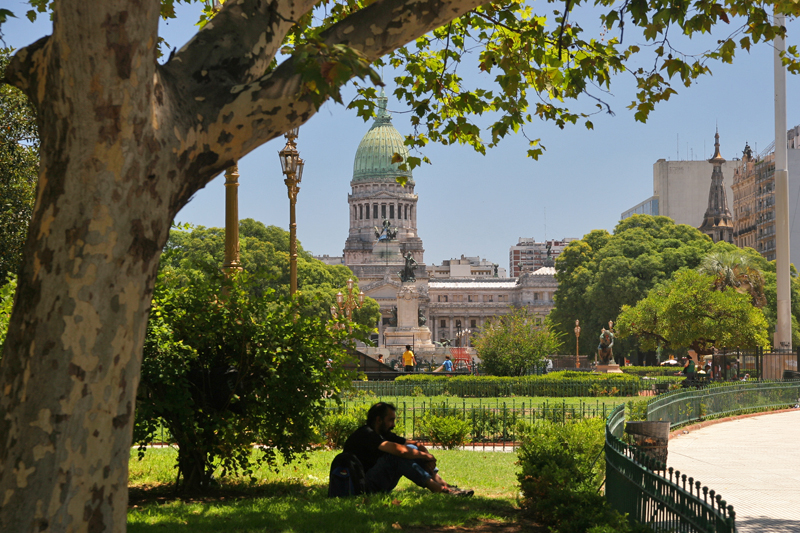
The plaza today at eye level.

Plaza del Congreso (English: Congress Square) is a public park facing the Argentine Congress in Buenos Aires. The plaza is part of a 3 hectare (7.5 acre) open space comprising three adjoining plazas to the east of the Congress building. The Kilometre Zero for all Argentine National Highways is marked on a milestone at the plaza.

== History ==
Colonial-era businessman Pedro Lorea purchased a 2 hectare (5 acre) lot in the Piety Market Hollow west of the growing hamlet of Buenos Aires in 1782. Lorea later donated around a third of this property for a carriage and cart stop. The Lorea matrimony lost their lives during the failed 1807 British invasions of the Río de la Plata and, in 1808, Viceroy Rafael de Sobremonte renamed the carriage lot in their honor.

Plaza Lorea retained this function until 1871, when the swamps west of it were drained for development. A flour mill and wholesale market opened in the surroundings and a water tower was installed in the center of the plaza, which became a landscaped public park. The rapid economic growth of late nineteenth-century Buenos Aires and the construction of the new Argentine Congress, begun in 1897, helped touch off improvements on Plaza Lorea before work on Congressional Plaza began. Local sculptor Juan Eugenio Boverie graced the plaza's new promenade in 1896 with El Perdón (a sculpture relocated to the westside Avellaneda Park in 1991). Perhaps the most memorable early contribution was the 1907 purchase of one of the few casts of the iconic The Thinker French sculptor Auguste Rodin made before he destroyed the mold.

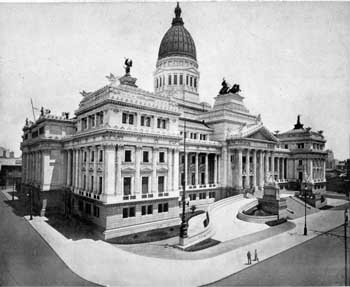
The motivation for the plaza, the Argentine Congress, shortly after its 1906 inaugural.

The inaugural of the Argentine Congress in 1906 (two blocks west of Plaza Lorea) created an aesthetic and urbanistic need for a namesake plaza, and on September 30, 1908, President José Figueroa Alcorta signed National Law 6286, a Congressional bill providing for the project. The Municipal Parks Director, French Argentine urbanist Charles Thays, envisioned a 3 hectare (7.5 acre) space divided crosswise by Montevideo Street and parallel to the Avenida de Mayo (May Avenue). His design was also approved because it required a minimal demolition of existing real estate, as it did not envisage lateral and rear plazas, as urbanist Joseph Bouvard had proposed.

Congressional Plaza was inaugurated in January 1910 by Mayor Manuel Güiraldes and President Figueroa Alcorta. Its inaugural coincided with the completion of numerous other parks, avenues and redevelopments (several of the most important designed by Thays) ahead of the May 25, 1910 centennial of the May Revolution, the Buenos Aires assembly whose declaration led to Independence from the Spanish Empire in 1816.

Following a 1967 city ordinance, May Avenue and most other city avenues and streets were made one way thoroughfares. Plaza Lorea, which in 1910 had been divided in two to facilitate traffic from May Avenue, in 1968 had its southern half resigned and added to Mariano Moreno Plaza to facilitate growing traffic further. May Avenue merges into Rivadavia Avenue at this junction.

The layout of the three plazas (Congress is at left).

== Overview ==
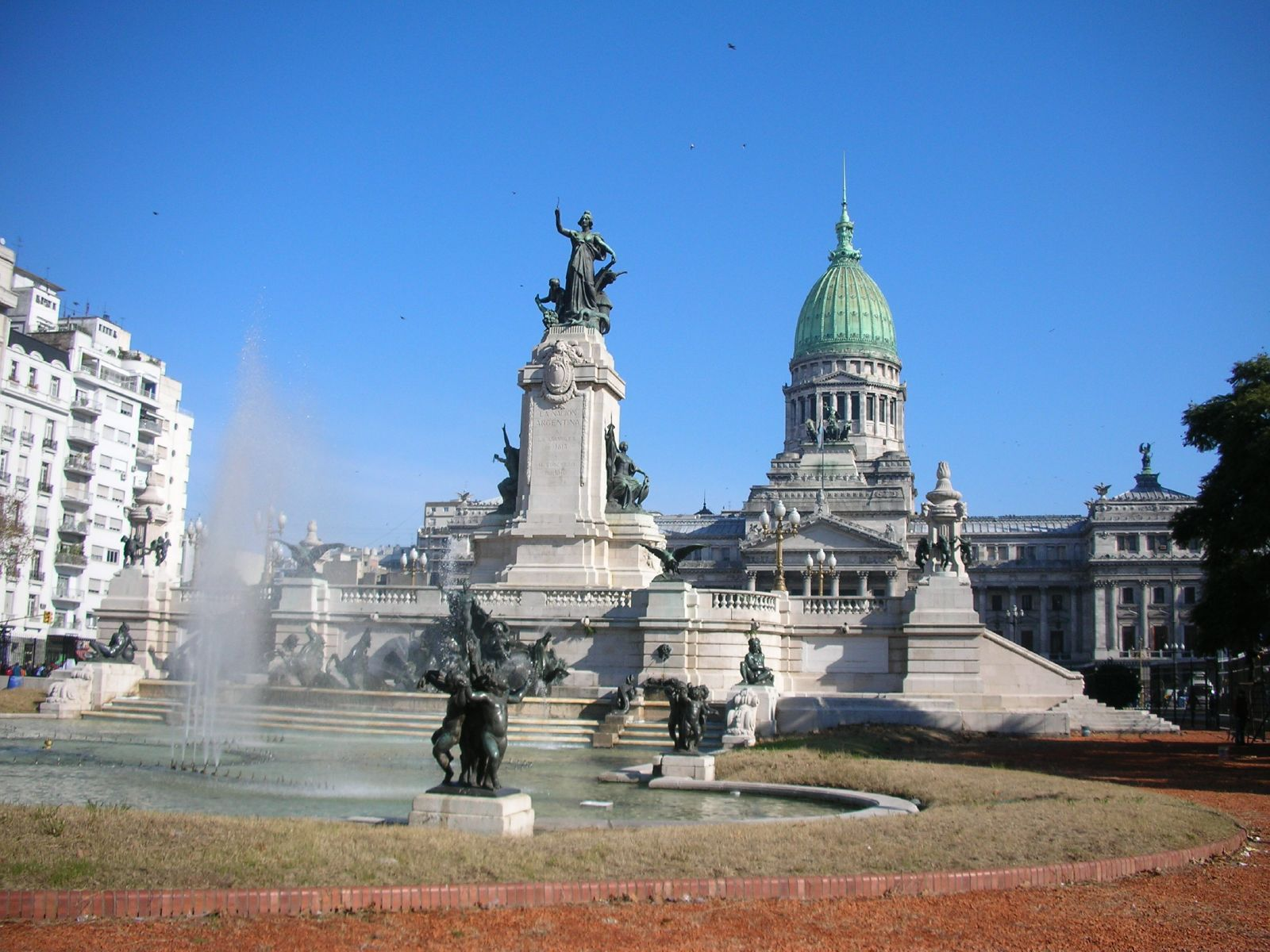
The Monument to the Two Congresses and behind it, Congress.

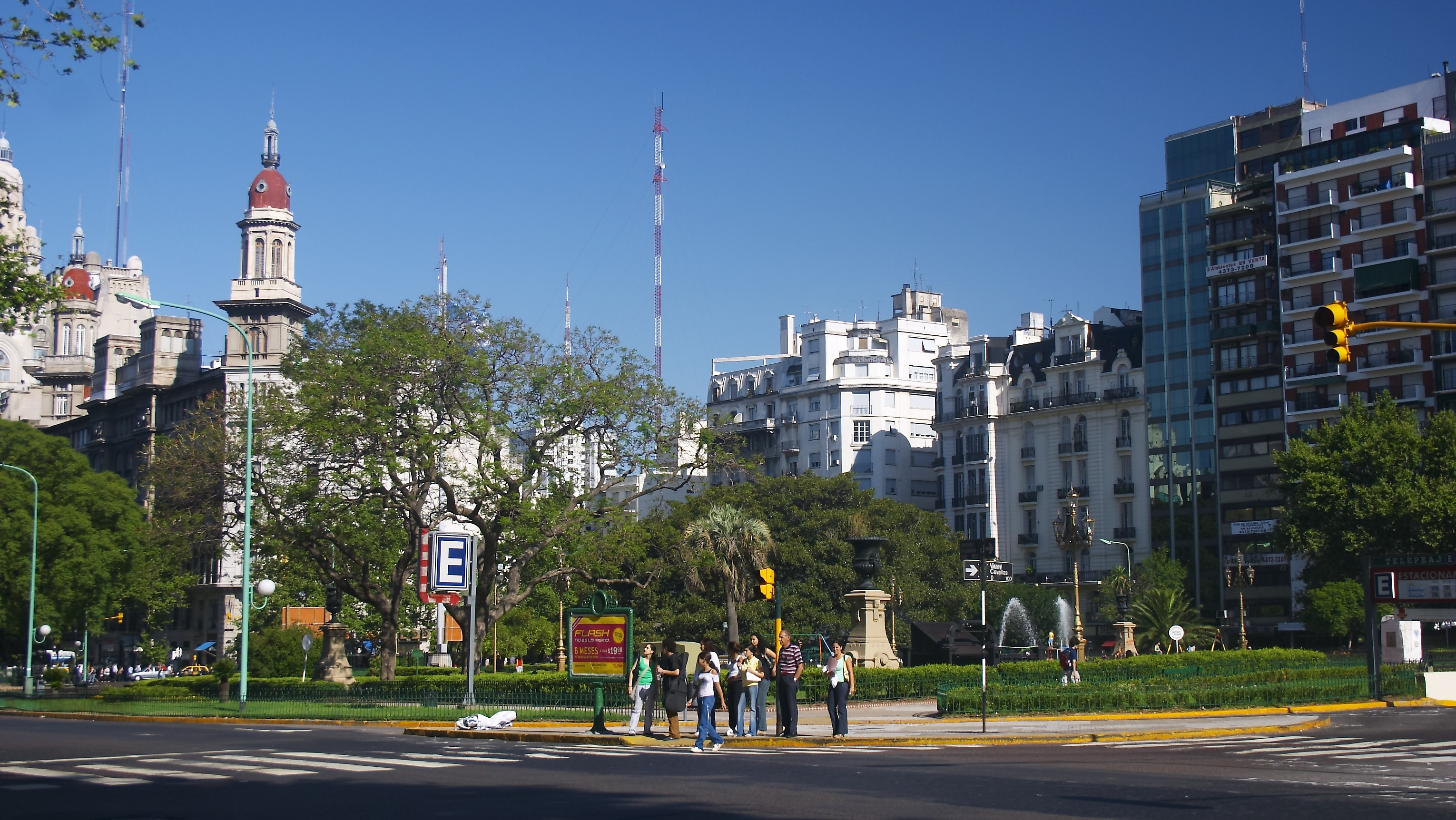
Mariano Moreno Plaza

Facing Congress, Congressional Plaza itself is dominated by the Monument to the Two Congresses, the work of Belgian sculptor Jules Lagae set on a Neoclassical esplanade designed by his fellow countryman, architect Henri d'Huicque, and completed in 1914. It was named in honor of the Constitutional Assembly of 1813, the first local attempt to create national law, and the Congress of Tucumán of 1816, which declared Independence from the Spanish Empire, and many locals refer to the plaza by that name. The monument's centerpiece, the Allegory of the Republic, and the remaining bronze allegories are set entirely in stone from Nancy, France. The monument is also known for its adjoining terraced fountain and its bronze Neptunes, the scene of light shows and the accompanying music by George Gershwin and Jacques Offenbach, early in the 20th century.

Suffering from repeated vandalism in the years since 1983, particularly, a decorative gated fence was erected around the monument in 1999. The opening of the gates by popular demand in 2002 resulted in renewed vandalism, and a new fence was installed in 2006, during renovations on the monument and fountain.

The three plazas and the Monument to the Two Congresses were designated a National Historic Monument by President Carlos Menem in 1997.

=== Monument of the Two Congresses ===
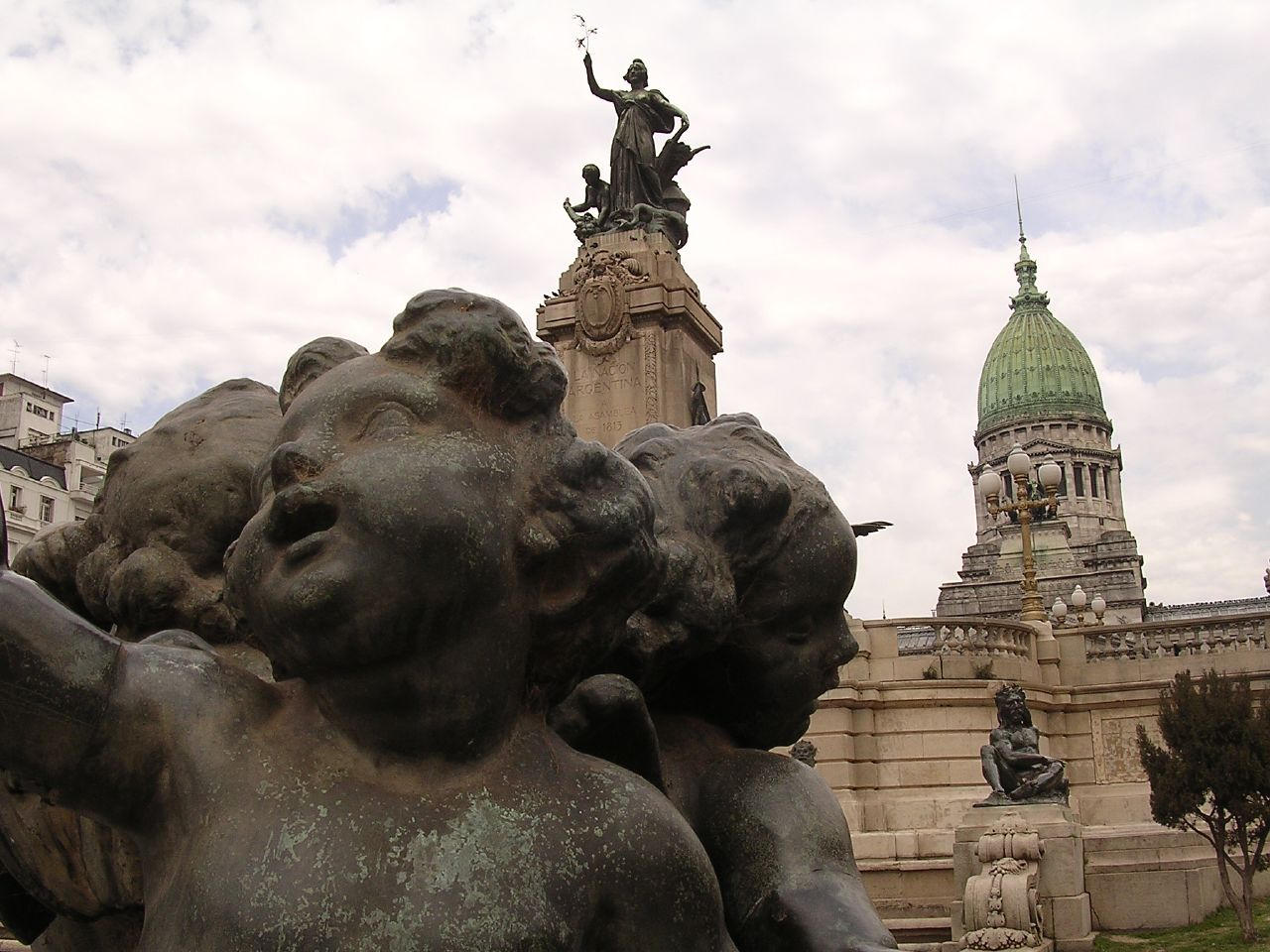
Monument of the Two Congresses

The Monumento de los dos Congresos in the Plaza des los Dos Congresos, was created in stone from Nancy. The monument was designed by the Belgian architect Eugène D'Huicque (1877–1955) and the bronze statues are the work of the Belgian artist Jules Lagae(1862–1931). It was created in Brussels, finished in 1909, and inaugurated in Buenos Aires on July 9, 1914.

The monument celebrates the centenary of the 1816 declaration of independence. The central figure represents the Republic on the march, with snake faces and an allegory of abundance at its feet. The two lateral figures represent the assembly of 1813 and the congress of 1816. There are also other representations of national fauna, notably of horses and condors.

== Plaza Mariano Moreno ==
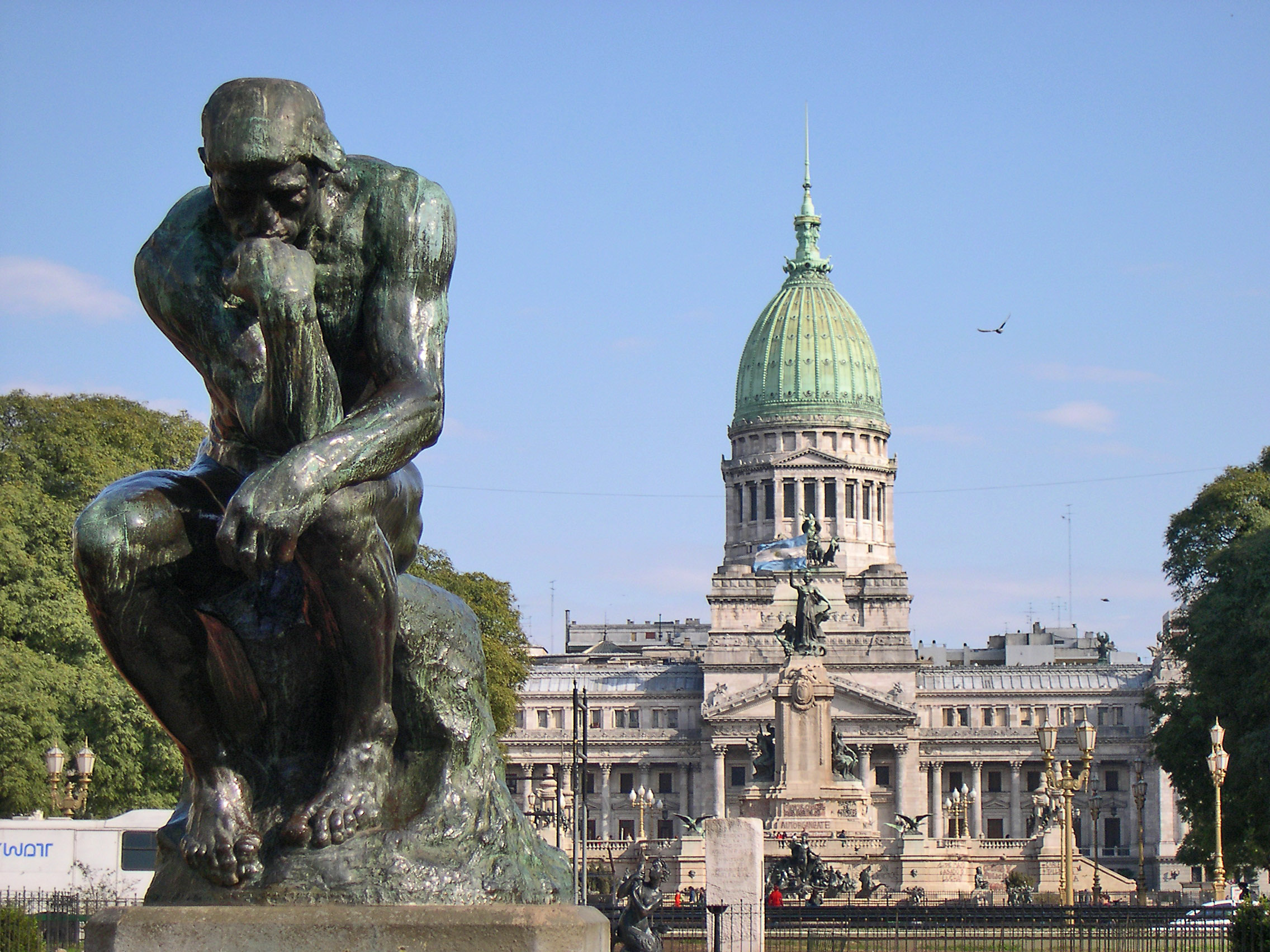
The Thinker, only the third of eight original casts made by Auguste Rodin.

Mariano Moreno Plaza, to the east, is separated from Congressional Plaza (proper) by Montevideo Avenue, and was named in honor of Mariano Moreno, the intellectual leader of the 1810 May Revolution that led to Independence. A monument in his honor was unveiled in 1910. Moreno Plaza is also known for the symbolic "Kilometer Zero" marker put up by the Ministry of Public Works in 1935. Buenos Aires Mayor and presidential candidate Fernando de la Rúa was on hand to unveil a nearby monument to his political mentor, the late centrist UCR leader Ricardo Balbín, in 1999. Moreno Plaza is best known to many as the site of one of the few surviving original casts of Auguste Rodin's The Thinker. Commissioned by Museums Director Eduardo Schiaffino for the city in 1907, he and Rodin had envisaged its placement on a pedestal on the grand steps in front of Congress – a plan which never materialized. Currently, its transfer to its intended site is under consideration.

=== Kilometre Zero Monument ===
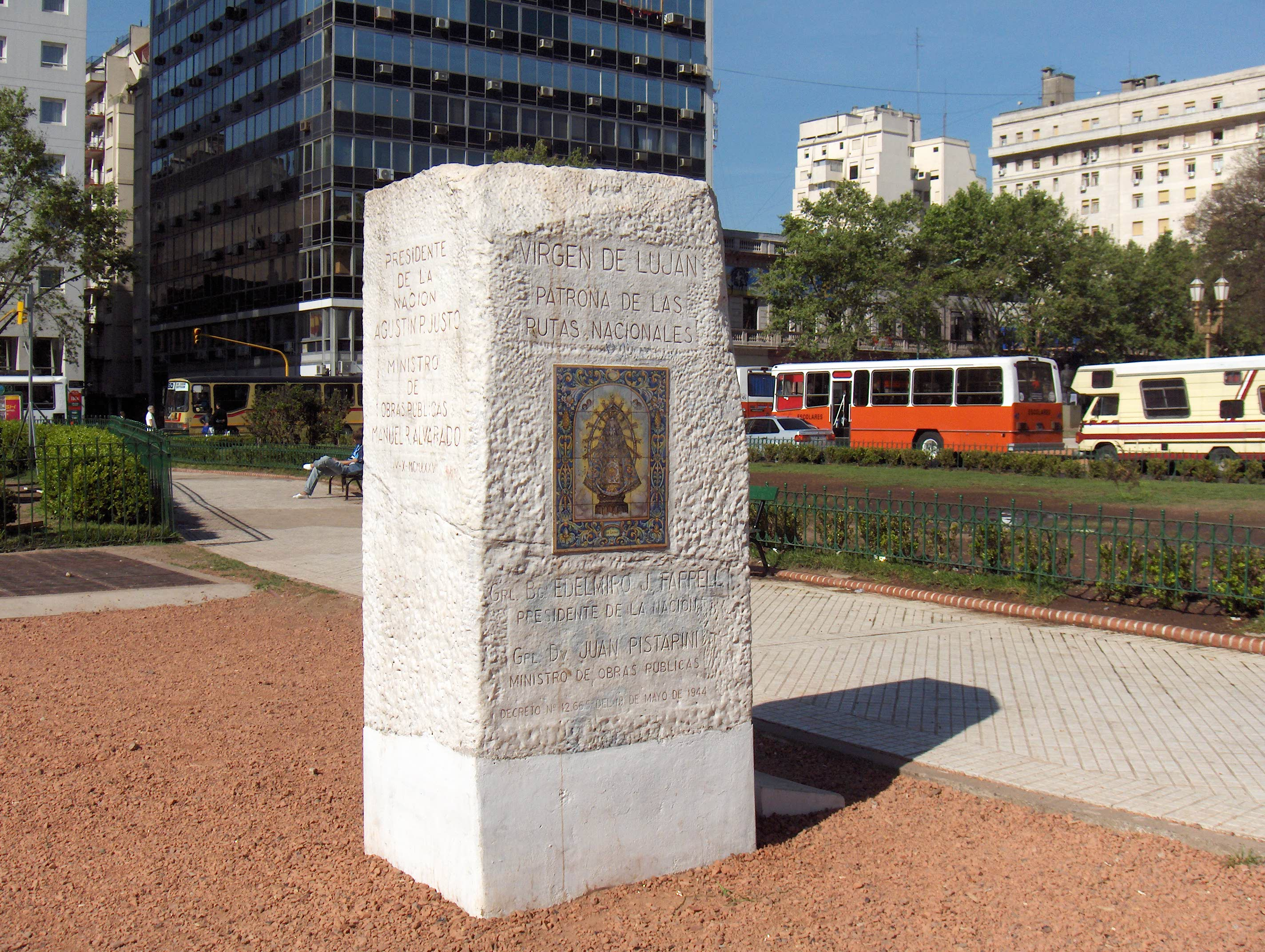
Kilometre Zero, Buenos Aires

Argentina marks Kilometre Zero with a monolith in this park. The work of the brothers Máximo and José Fioravanti, the structure was placed on the north side of Plaza Lorea on October 2, 1935; it was moved to its present location on May 18, 1944. An image of Our Lady of Luján (honored on the monolith as "the patron saint of the national road network") appears on the monolith's north face, a relief map of Argentina is on the south face, plaques in honor of José de San Martín are west, and on its eastern side, the date of the decree and the name of the relevant authorities.

=== Monument to Mariano Moreno ===
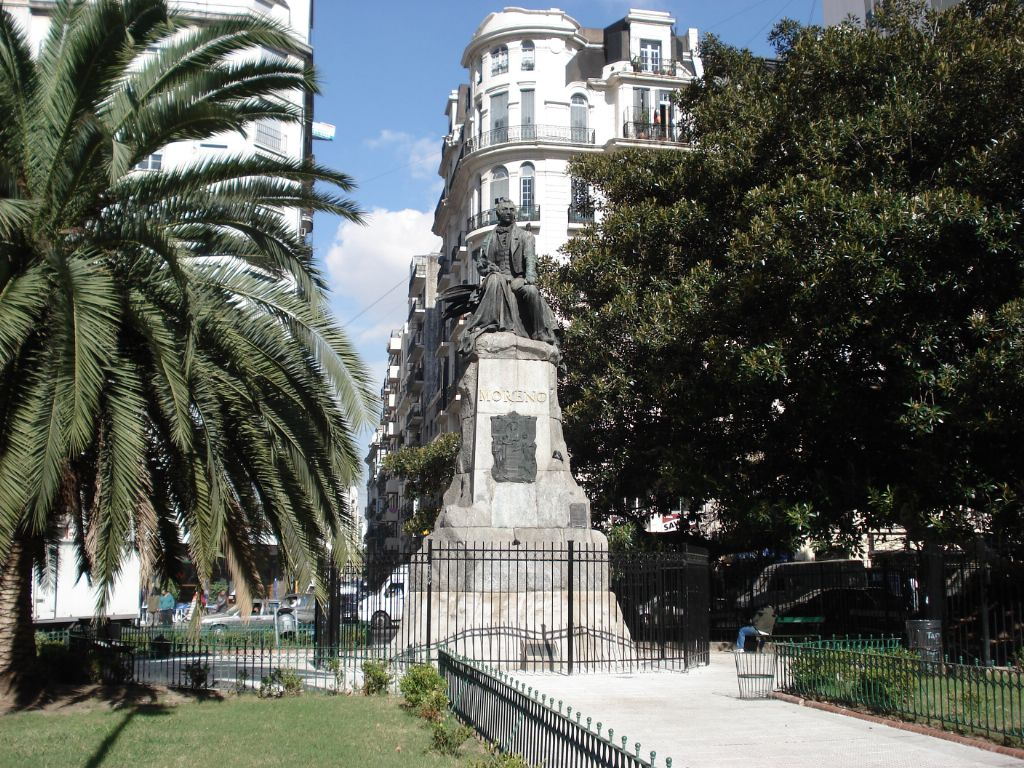
Monument to Mariano Moreno

The monument to Mariano Moreno is in Plaza Mariano Moreno. It opened on 1 October 1910. The statue was created by Miguel Blay y Fábregas (1866 – 1936).

Mariano Moreno (1778 – 1811) was a lawyer, journalist and politician who played a decisive role in the May Revolution that led to the declaration of independence of Argentina from Spain. Moreno was a secretary in the First Junta that replaced the viceroy of Spain. He suppressed the uprising of Santiago de Liniers in Córdoba (whom he had executed later), and organized the liberating expedition to Upper Peru. He was then removed from office by Cornelio Saavedra.

=== The Thinker ===
The third of only eight original casts made by Auguste Rodin, commissioned by Museums Director Eduardo Schiaffino for the city in 1907, he and Rodin had envisaged its placement on a pedestal on the grand steps in front of Congress – a plan which never materialized. Currently, its transfer to its intended site is under consideration.

== Plaza Lorea ==
Less than half its original size, Plaza Lorea is commonly referred to as a plazoleta among locals. The plaza itself is dominated by the monument to José Manuel Estrada, a public official known for his opposition to secular education during the late 19th century. The conservative government in power at the time commissioned the monument in 1937, and it was unveiled a decade later.

The grounds of this square were owned by the Spanish merchant Isidro Lorea, who with his wife died in this place in 1807 fending off the British troops during the British invasions of the Río de la Plata.

=== Monument to José Manuel Estrada ===
The sculpture of Estrada was ordered in 1937 by the municipality of Buenos Aires and inaugurated on 11 November 1947. It was created by the sculptor Héctor Rocha (1893-?), who also created a statue of General Manuel Belgrano in the plaza Manuel Belgrano, inaugurated in 1961, and the Monumento a Guillermo Rawson.

This monument is to the late 19th century historian, journalist and publicist José Manuel Estrada (1842–1894), a leading Catholic intellectual and politician in Buenos Aires in the second half of the 19th century.
