= Equestrian statue of Leopold II, Brussels =

Equestrian statue of Leopold II
- Statue équestre de Léopold II (French); Ruiterstandbeeld van Leopold II (Dutch)
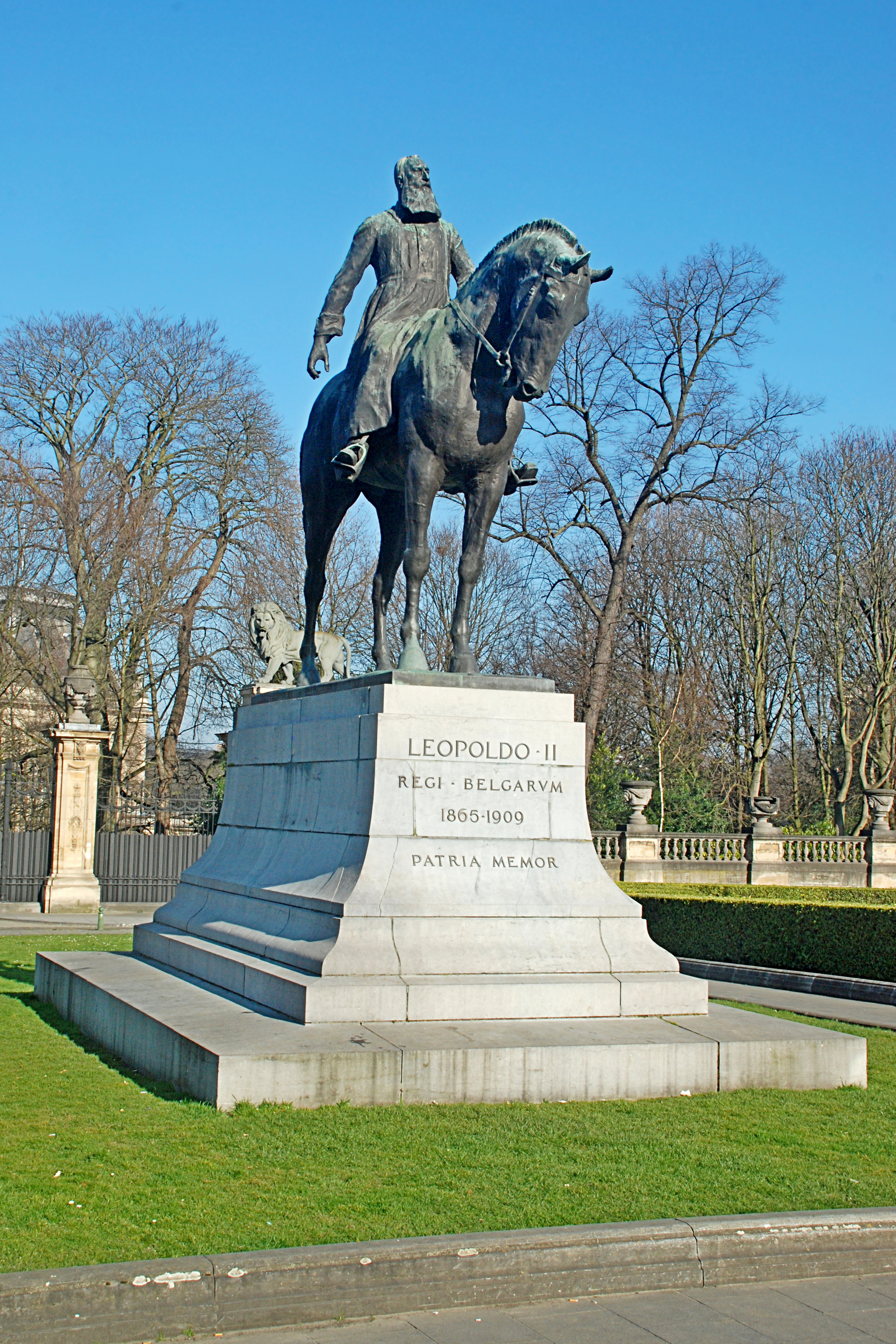
- Statue of King Leopold II
- Interactive map of Equestrian statue of Leopold II
- Location: Place du Trône / Troonplein; 1000 City of Brussels, Brussels-Capital Region, Belgium
- Coordinates: 50°50′26″N 4°21′52″E
- Designer: Thomas Vinçotte, François Malfait
- Type: Equestrian statue
- Completion date: 1926
- Dedicated to: King Leopold II

The equestrian statue of Leopold II (French: Statue équestre de Léopold II; Dutch: Ruiterstandbeeld van Leopold II) is a bronze equestrian statue erected in Brussels, Belgium, in memory of King Leopold II, second King of the Belgians. It was created by the sculptor Thomas Vinçotte in 1914, but it was not finalised until 1926 by the architect François Malfait, when it was inaugurated in the king's honour.

The statue stands on the Place du Trône/Troonplein, to the south-east of the Royal Palace of Brussels, at the point where the Rue Ducale/Hertogsstraat joins the Boulevard du Régent/Regentlaan (Small Ring), and a few tens of metres from the Royal Stables of Brussels. It is also close to Matongé, an African (mainly Congolese) district of Ixelles.

== History ==
King Leopold II died in 1909, and as for many Kings of the Belgians, the Belgian authorities took the initiative, in 1914, to erect a statue in his honour. To do this, the Belgian state raised more than 625,000 Belgian francs. (Note: This amount is roughly equivalent to €2.5 million in 2025 when taking into account inflation.) On 31 May 1914, the Belgian official journal and the press launched an appeal for anyone wishing to contribute to erecting the statue. The appeal mentioned that during 35 years, Belgium, under Leopold II's leadership, had expanded by a magnificent colony. The initiative was successful, in which even Leopold's successor, King Albert I, took part himself, along with aristocrats, the military, colonial companies, and some citizens.

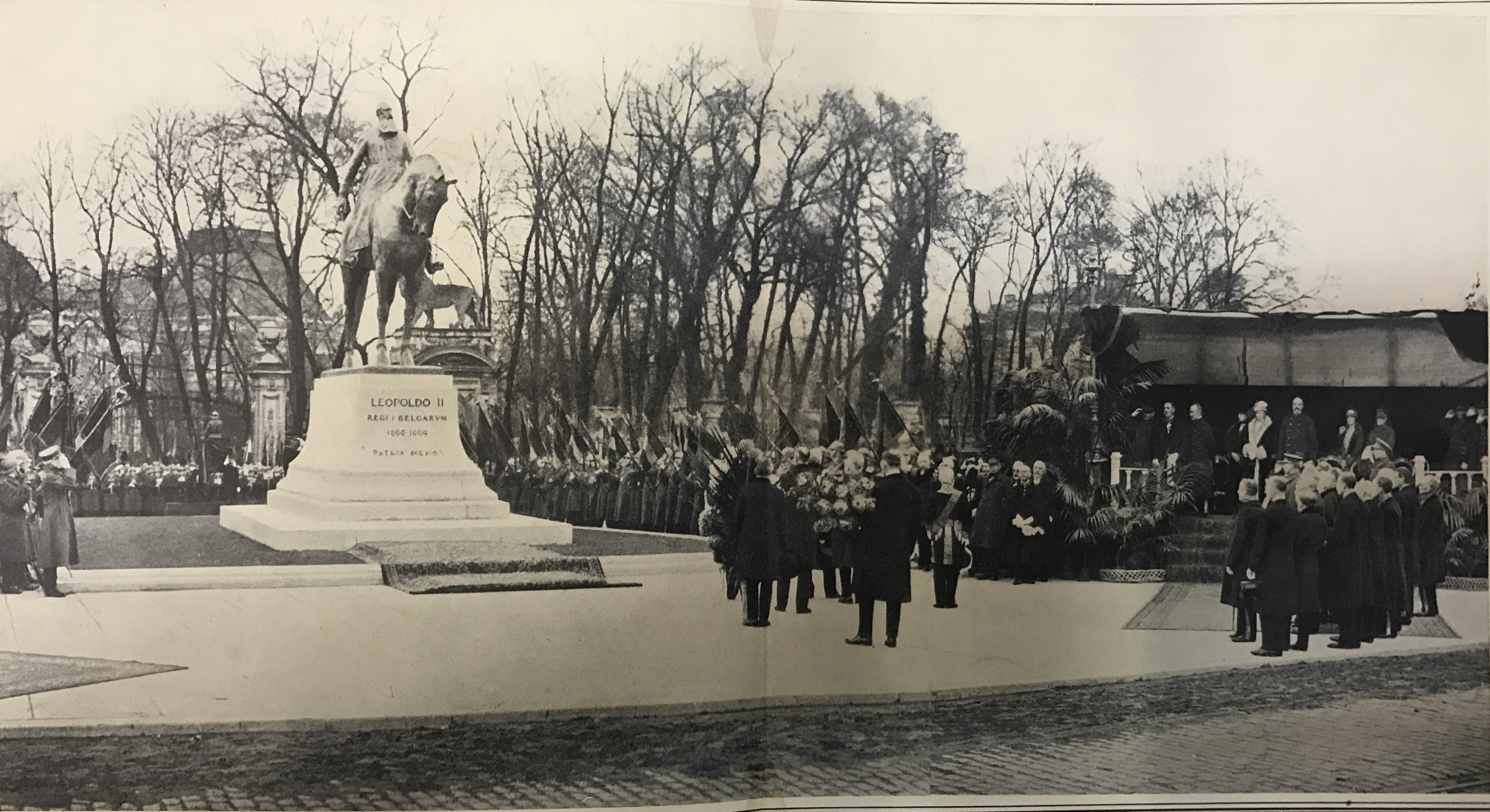
Inauguration of the equestrian statue of Leopold II on 15 November 1926

The statue's construction, however, was delayed due to the First World War and it was not until the end of the war that the work was redesigned by the sculptor Thomas Vinçotte, with the help of the architect François Malfait and the Union Minière du Haut-Katanga, which provided the raw material. The bronze statue was cast by the Compagnie des Bronzes de Bruxelles and was inaugurated on 15 November 1926, the feast day of the dynasty, but also the patronal feast of Leopold II. This ceremony was marked by the presence of the entire Belgian royal family and the authorities who came in procession to the scene.

== Description ==
The imposing bronze equestrian statue is placed on a pedestal made of blue stone blocks, the eastern face of which, facing the Boulevard du Régent/Regentlaan, displays a Latin dedication with the king's name, his title and the dates of his reign: "LEOPOLDO II / REGI BELGARUM / 1865–1909 / PATRIA MEMOR". The statue bears the signature of Thomas Vinçotte and the name of the Compagnie des Bronzes de Bruxelles, while the pedestal displays the name of François Malfait, as well as the date of construction.

On the back, a small bronze plaque (approximately 20 by 15 cm (8 by 6 in)) reads: Le cuivre et l'étain de cette statue proviennent du Congo Belge. Ils ont été fournis gracieusement par l'Union Minière du Haut-Katanga ("The copper and tin of this statue come from the Belgian Congo. They were kindly supplied by the Union Minière du Haut-Katanga").

Equestrian statue

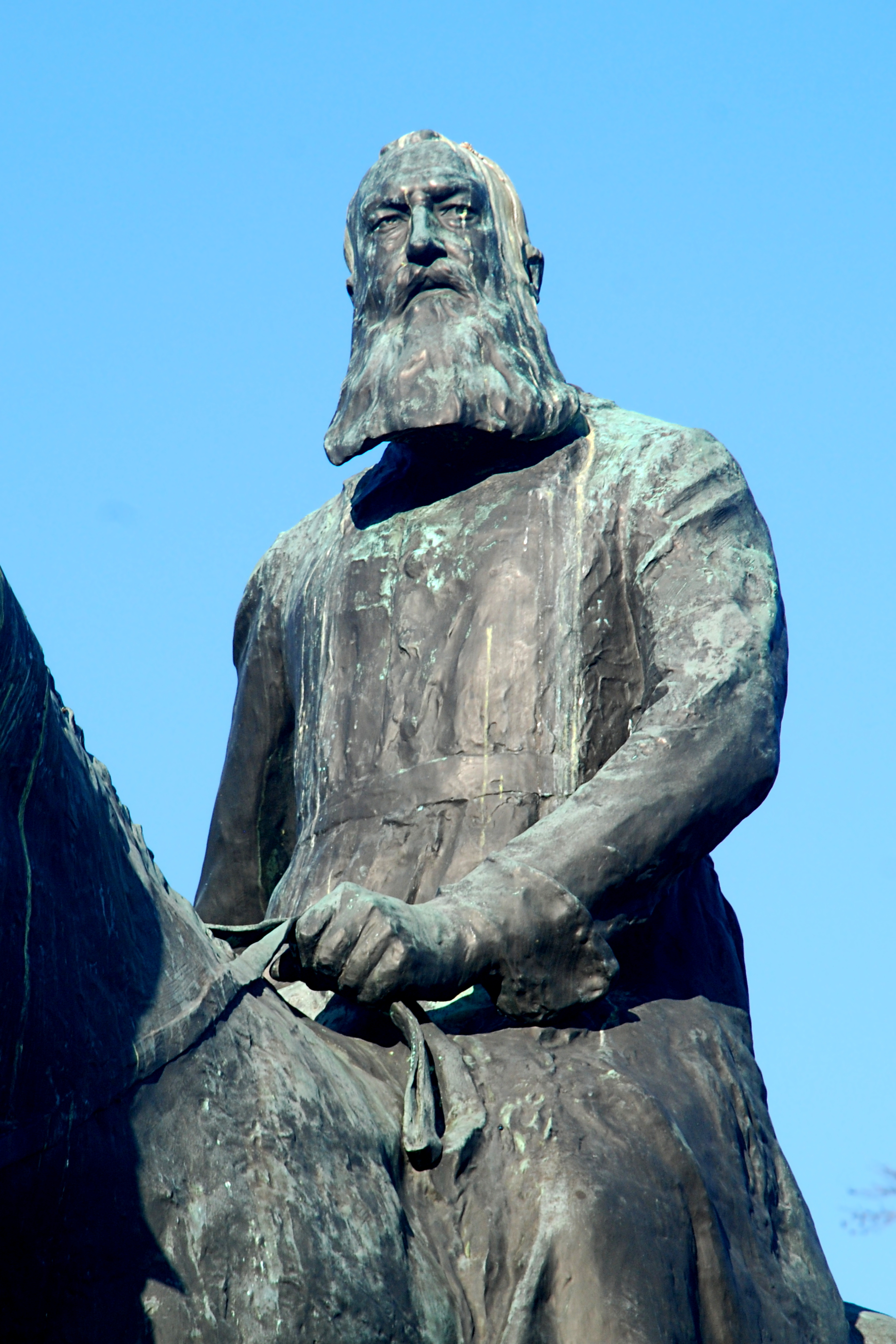
Closeup of King Leopold II

Pedestal

== Controversies ==
The presence of the statue in the centre of Brussels has become increasingly controversial, since the figure of Leopold II is no longer as admired and respected as at the time of its construction. Indeed, it is today mainly associated with Belgian colonial history and the Congo Free State, a territory over which Leopold exercised de facto sovereignty from 1885 to 1908.

The statue has been vandalised several times with red and white paint, including by the writer and activist Théophile de Giraud in 2008. In June 2020, a petition for its removal was signed over 45,000 times within several days. A majority in the Brussels Parliament wants either to recontextualise or to remove all Leopold II statues in Brussels, including this one.

== See also ==
- List of statues of Leopold II of Belgium
- Sculpture in Brussels
- History of Brussels
- Culture of Belgium
- Belgium in the long nineteenth century
