= Thomas Vinçotte =

Belgian medallist, sculptor (1850–1925)

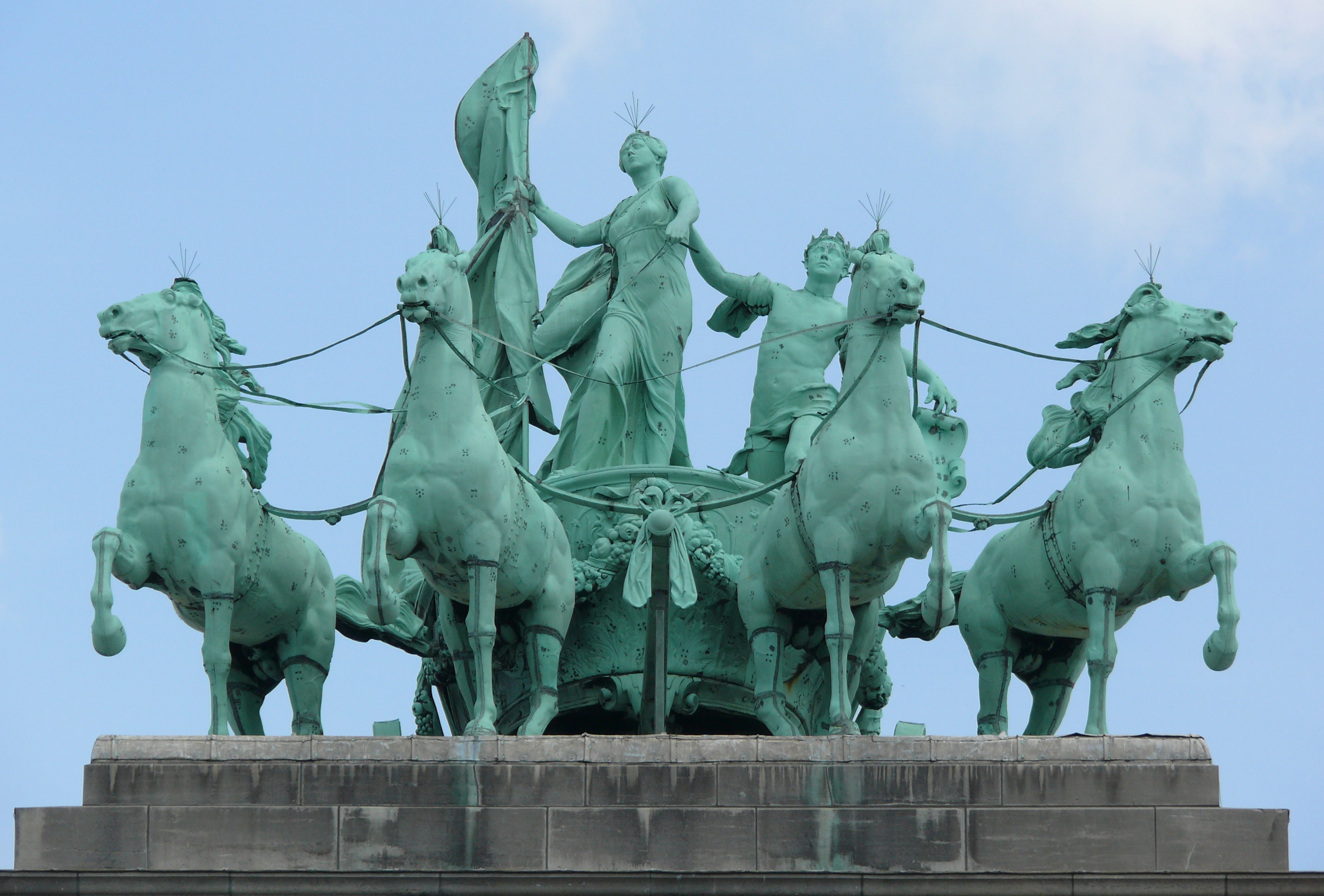
The quadriga (or Brabant Raising the National Flag) at the Parc du Cinquantenaire/Jubelpark, Brussels, with Jules Lagae, 1904–1905

Baron Thomas Jules Vinçotte (French pronunciation: [tɔmɑ ʒyl vɛ̃sɔt]; 1850–1925) was a Belgian sculptor and medallist.

== Life ==
Vinçotte was the son of Jean-Marie Vinçotte, born in Borgerhout and brother of the engineer Robert Vinçotte. Thomas initially trained at the Académie Royale des Beaux-Arts in Brussels under Joseph Jacquet and Eugène Simonis, then continued his education in Paris at the École des Beaux-Arts under Pierre-Jules Cavelier. He returned to Belgium and from 1886 through 1921 he lectured at the National University of Fine Arts in Antwerp.

Vinçotte developed strong social and political ties with the court of King Leopold II, as evidenced by his baronial title, his many commissions for large government projects, multiple equestrian statues of the king, portrait busts of the royal family and important officials, and his designs for Belgian coinage circa 1905.

A street in Schaerbeek is named in his honor.

== Honours ==
- 1881: Knight in the Order of Leopold.
- 1887: Officer in the Order of Leopold.
- 1896: Commander in the Order of Leopold.

== Work ==
- Allegory of Truth, a marble monument to sculptor G. L. Godecharle, Brussels Park, 1881
- Le dompteur de chevaux ("Horse Tamer"), Avenue Louise/Louizalaan, Brussels, 1885
- Bronze monument to François Anneessens, Place Anneessens/Anneessensplein, Brussels, 1889
- Bronze monument to Jan Palfijn, Schouwburgplein, Kortrijk, 1889
- Pediment sculpture showing Belgium flanked by allegorical groups representing Industry and Agriculture, Royal Palace of Brussels, c. 1900
- Bronze bust of Georges Montefiore-Levi, University of Liège, 1904
- The quadriga entitled Brabant Raising the National Flag or Quadriga of Brabant, atop the triumphal arch at the Parc du Cinquantenaire/Jubelpark, Brussels, with fellow sculptor Jules Lagae, 1904–1905
- Multifigure monument to the Belgian inventor Zénobe Gramme, Liège, 1905
- Two bronze figures of Fame with chariots, atop the Royal Museum of Fine Arts, Antwerp, installed 1905
- Monument to the Belgian Pioneers in Congo, at the Parc du Cinquantenaire, Brussels, 1921
- Equestrian Statue of Leopold II, Place du Trône/Troonplein, Brussels, 1926
- Bronze group of Seahorses and Tritons, for the park of the Royal Castle of Ardenne (transferred to Laeken Park in Brussels)
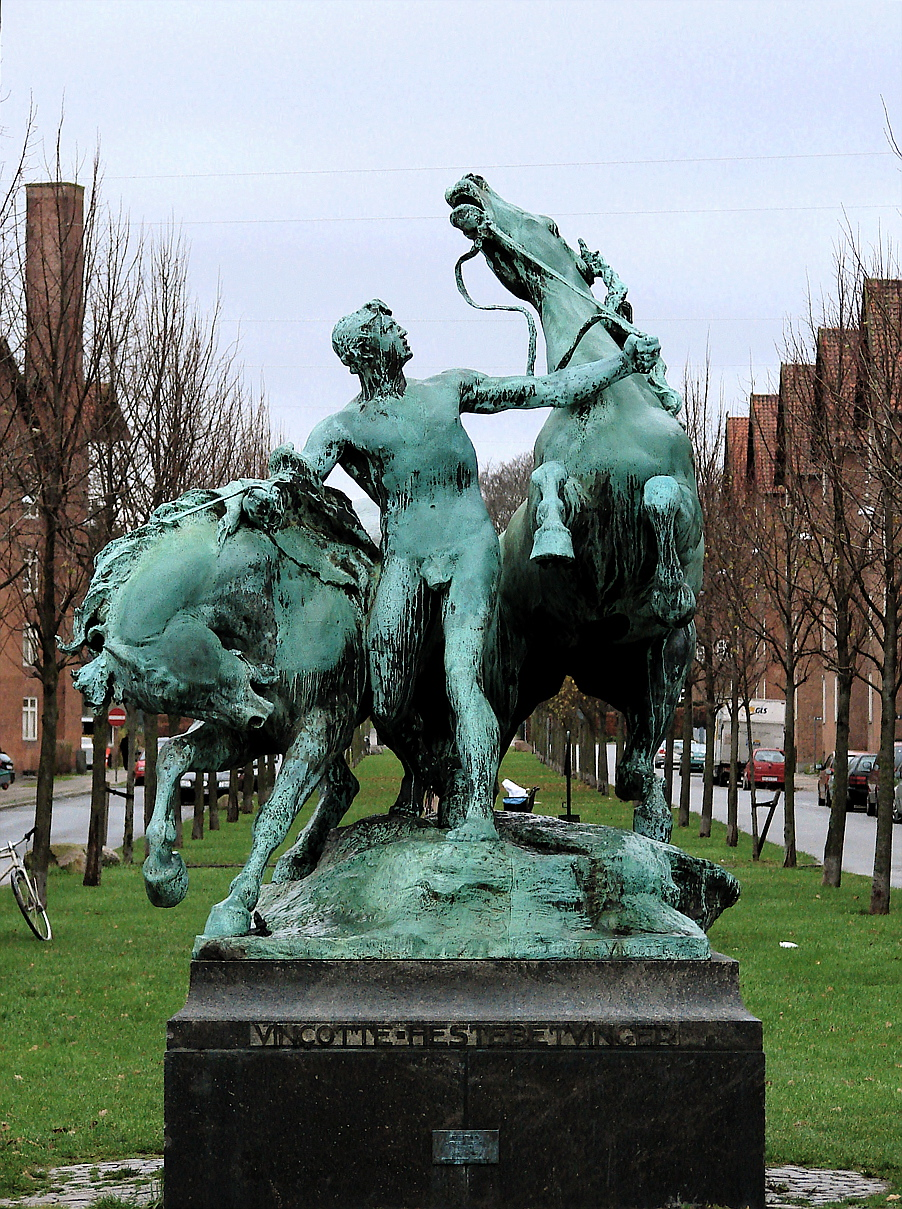
Le dompteur de chevaux, Avenue Louise/Louizalaan, Brussels, 1885

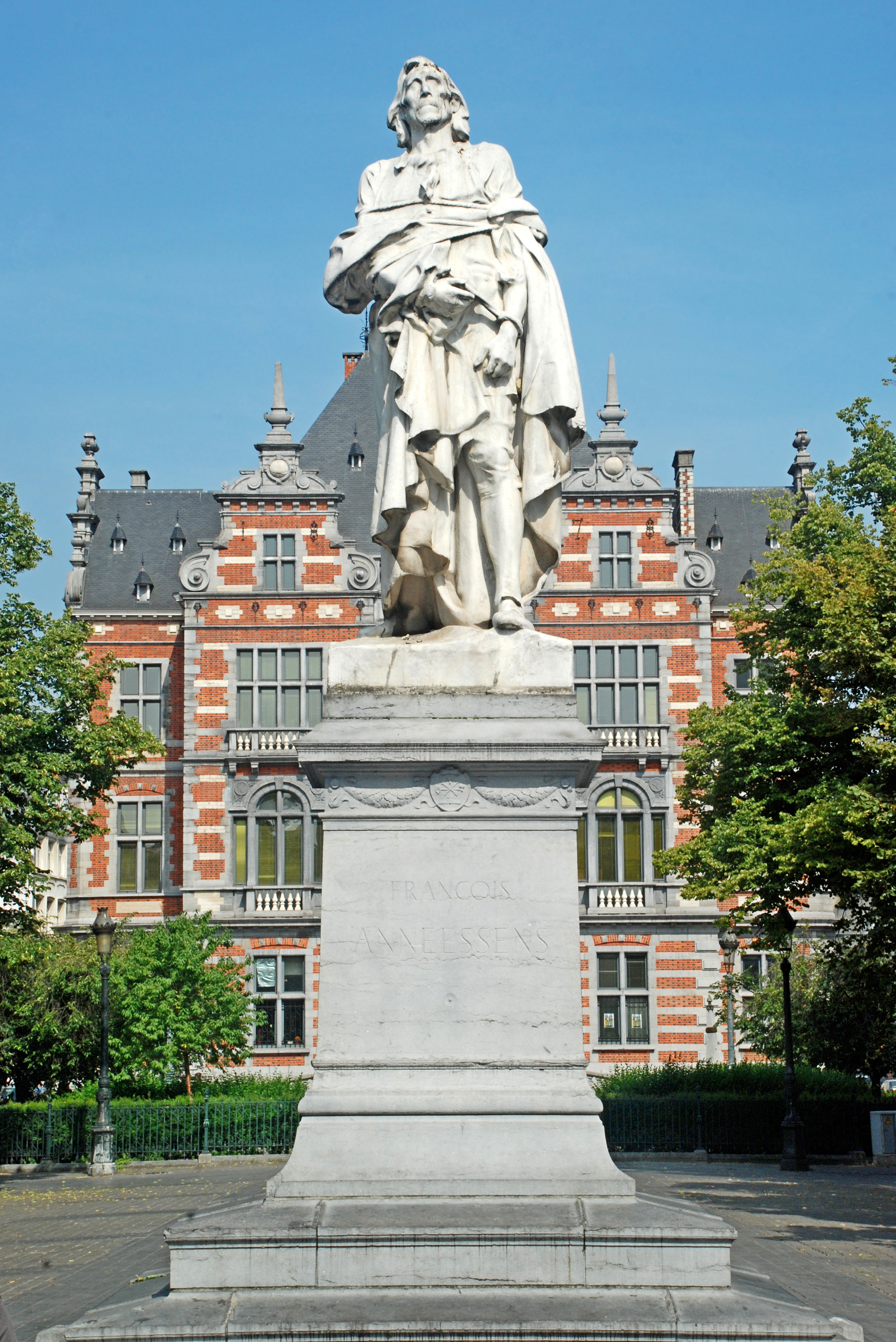
Monument to François Anneessens, Place Anneessens/Anneessensplein, Brussels, 1889

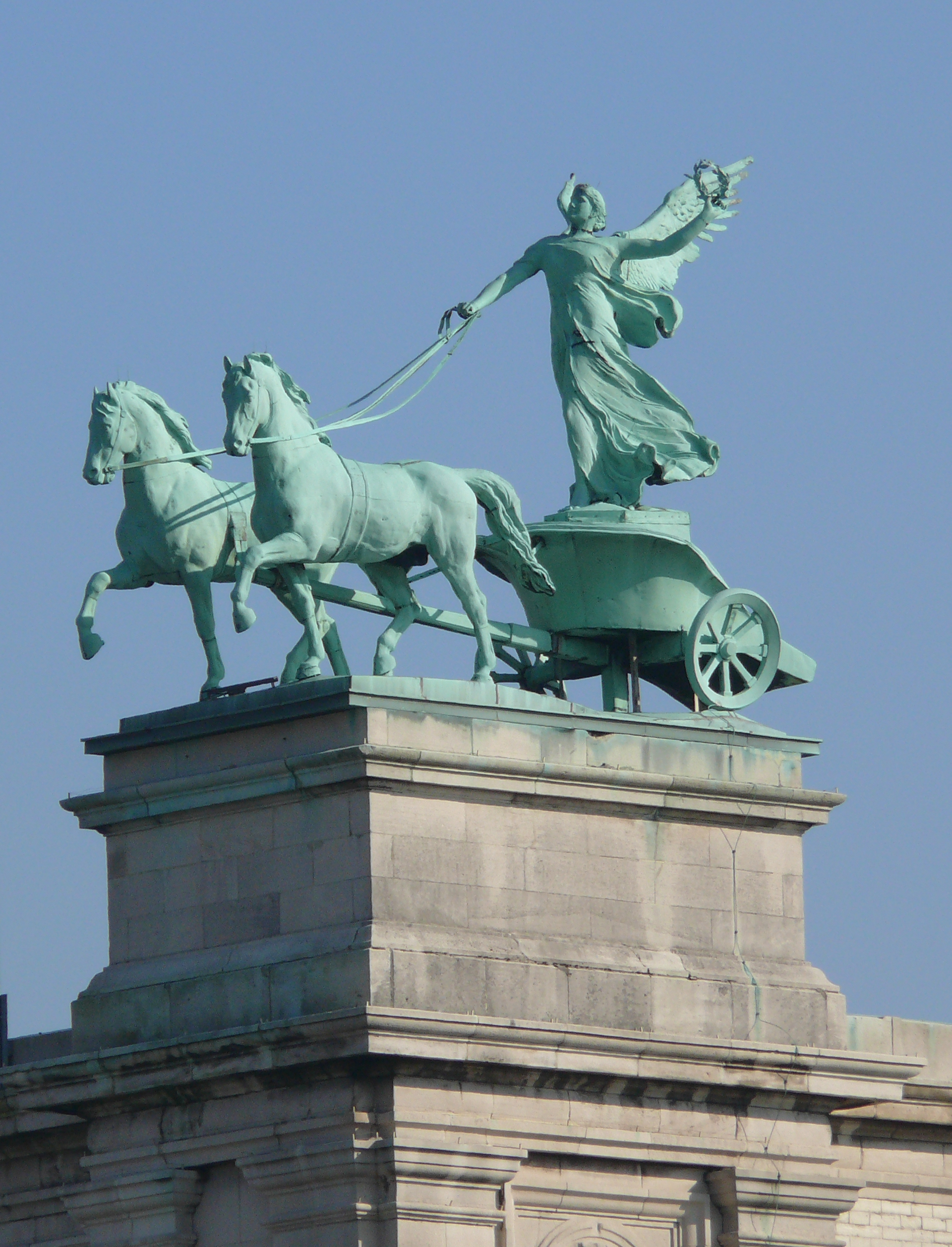
Fame with chariot, atop the Royal Museum of Fine Arts, Antwerp, 1905

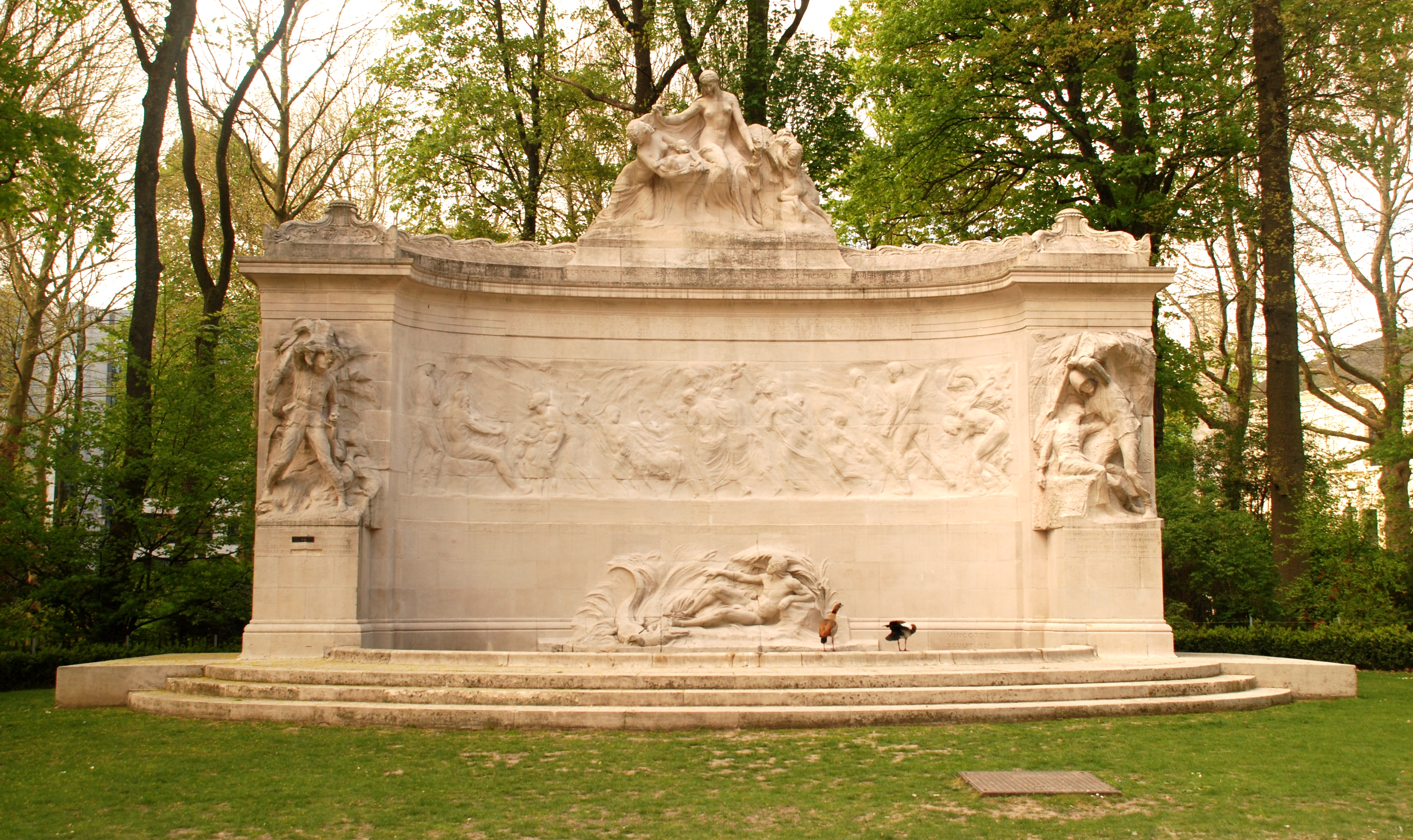
Monument to the Belgian Pioneers in Congo, Cinquantenaire, Brussels, 1921

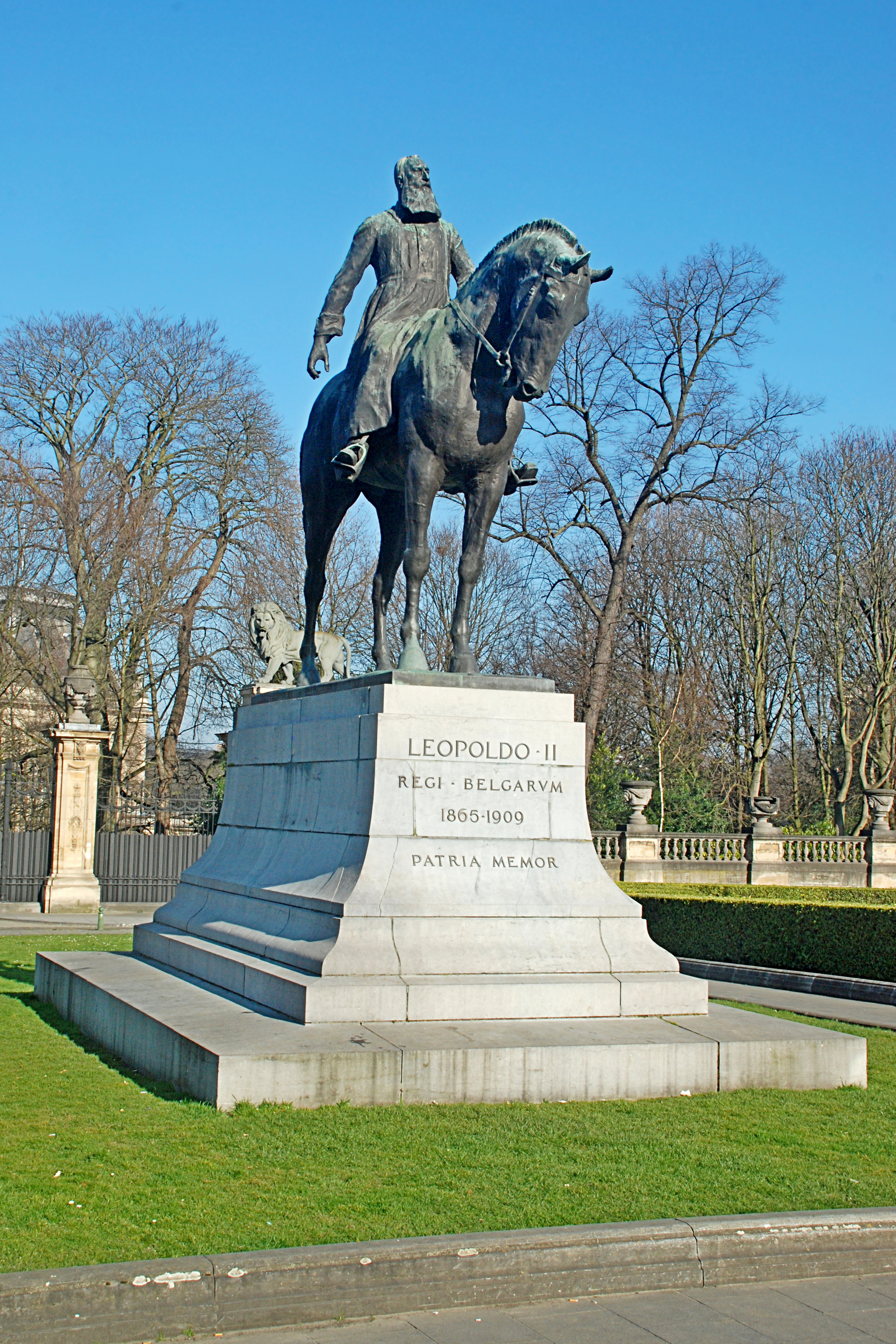
Equestrian Statue of Leopold II, Place du Trône/Troonplein, Brussels, 1926
