= Equestrian statue of Leopold II, Ostend =

Equestrian statue in Ostend, Belgium

Equestrian statue of Leopold II
- Ruiterstandbeeld van Leopold II (Dutch)
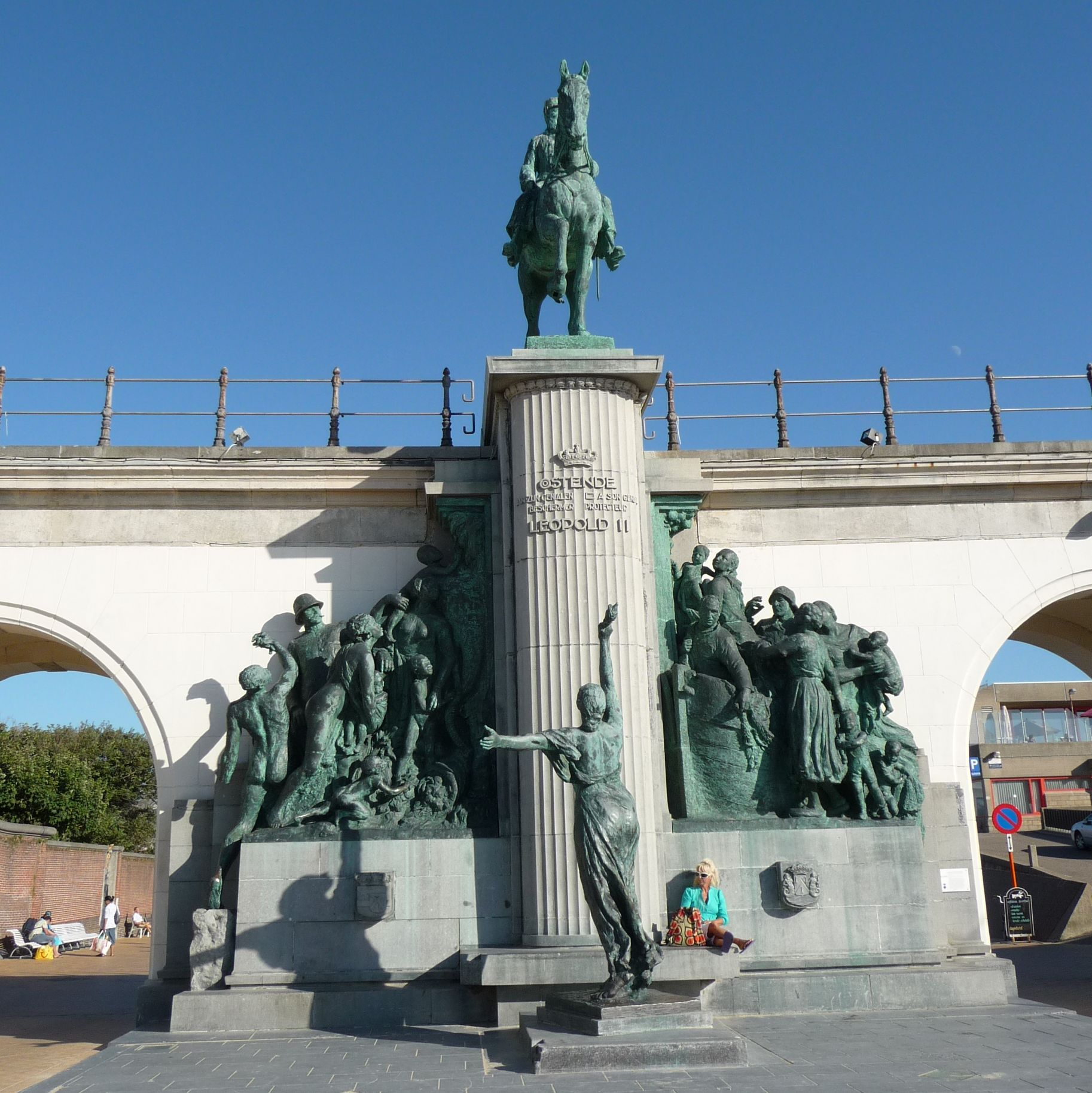
- Statue of King Leopold II
- Interactive map of Equestrian statue of Leopold II
- Location: Ostend, Belgium
- Coordinates: 51°13′38″N 2°54′17″E
- Designer: Alfred Courtens
- Type: Equestrian statue
- Completion date: 1931
- Dedicated to: King Leopold II

The equestrian statue of Leopold II (Dutch: Ruiterstandbeeld van Leopold II) is a monument erected in Ostend, Belgium, in memory of King Leopold II, second King of the Belgians. It is located on the Royal Galleries by the beach. The king was commemorated here as a benefactor of Ostend and the Belgian Congo. The inauguration was on 19 July 1931.

Partly due to Leopold II's colonial regime, the monument is the subject of ongoing controversy and has been vandalised several times.

== History ==
During King Leopold II's reign, Thomas Vinçotte produced a portrait bust of the king, which is now in the Royal Greenhouses of Laeken. Shortly after the king's death in 1909, plans started to honour him, as a benefactor of Ostend and the Belgian Congo.

After the First World War, the city government started work on plans for a statue. The sculptor Alfred Courtens was commissioned, together with his brother, the architect Antoine Courtens. The City Council may have hoped to regain the dynasty as summer residents but after Leopold II's death, Ostend's status as a royal summer residence quickly crumbled. On 22 September 1981, the statue was declared a protected monument.

== Description ==
The equestrian statue of Leopold II is known locally as De Drie Gapers ("The Three Gaps"). The middle of the three passages was made on the sea side.

The monument has an important architectural part that roughly consists of a voluminous upright column, with two horizontal bases on the left and right. This gives a form of a kind of double L monogram (two L's turned away from each other), the monogram that Leopold II often used. On top in bronze, Leopold II sits in military uniform on horseback looking over the North Sea.

At the bottom left a larger than life sculptural group, also in bronze, depicting Gratitude of the Congolese to Leopold II for freeing them from slavery among the Arabs. On the right, a pendant, depicting Tribute of the Ostend fishing population.

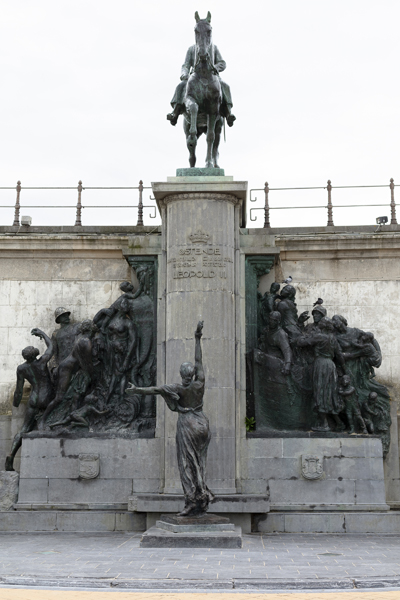
Frontal view

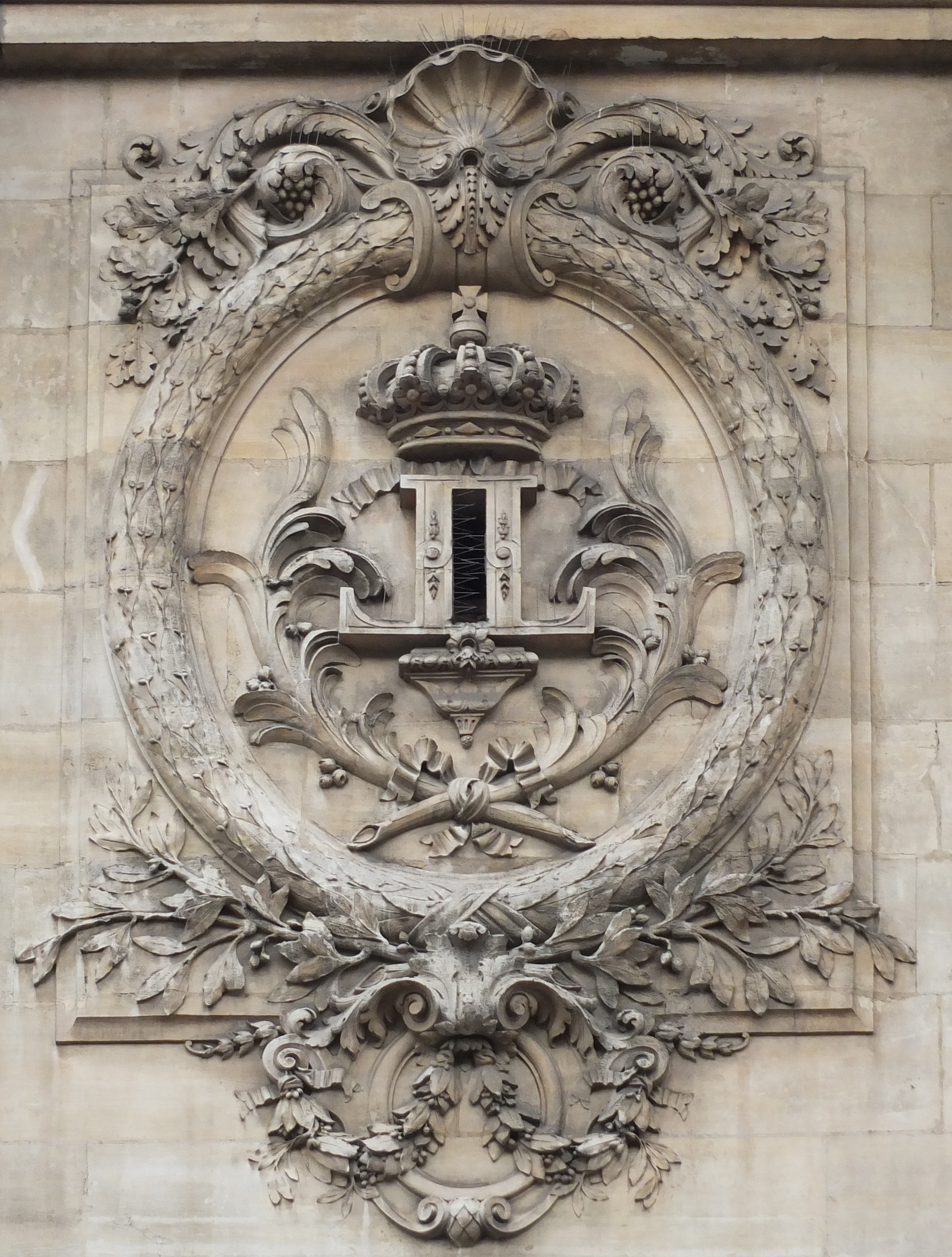
Monogram of King Leopold II

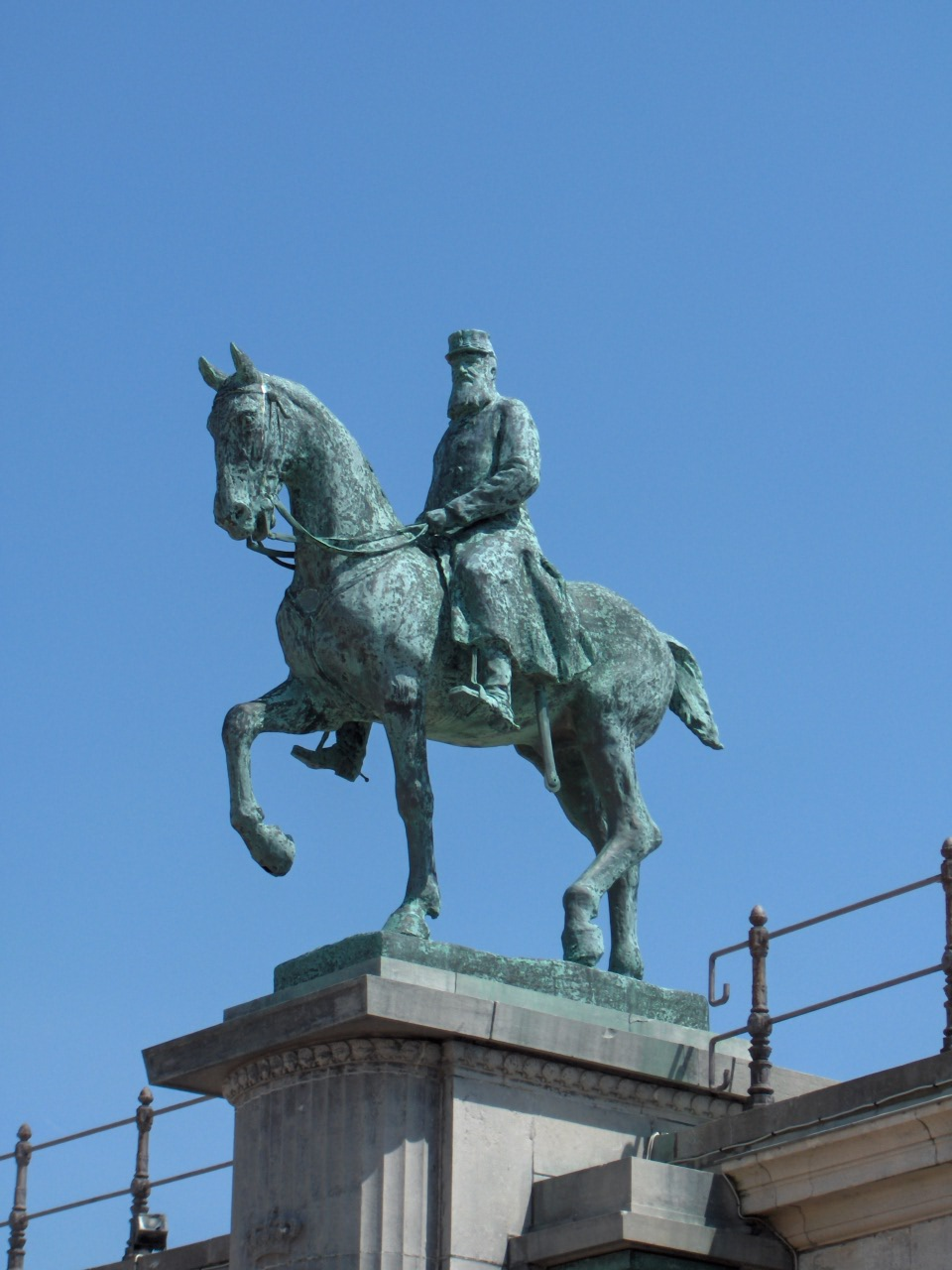
Equestrian statue

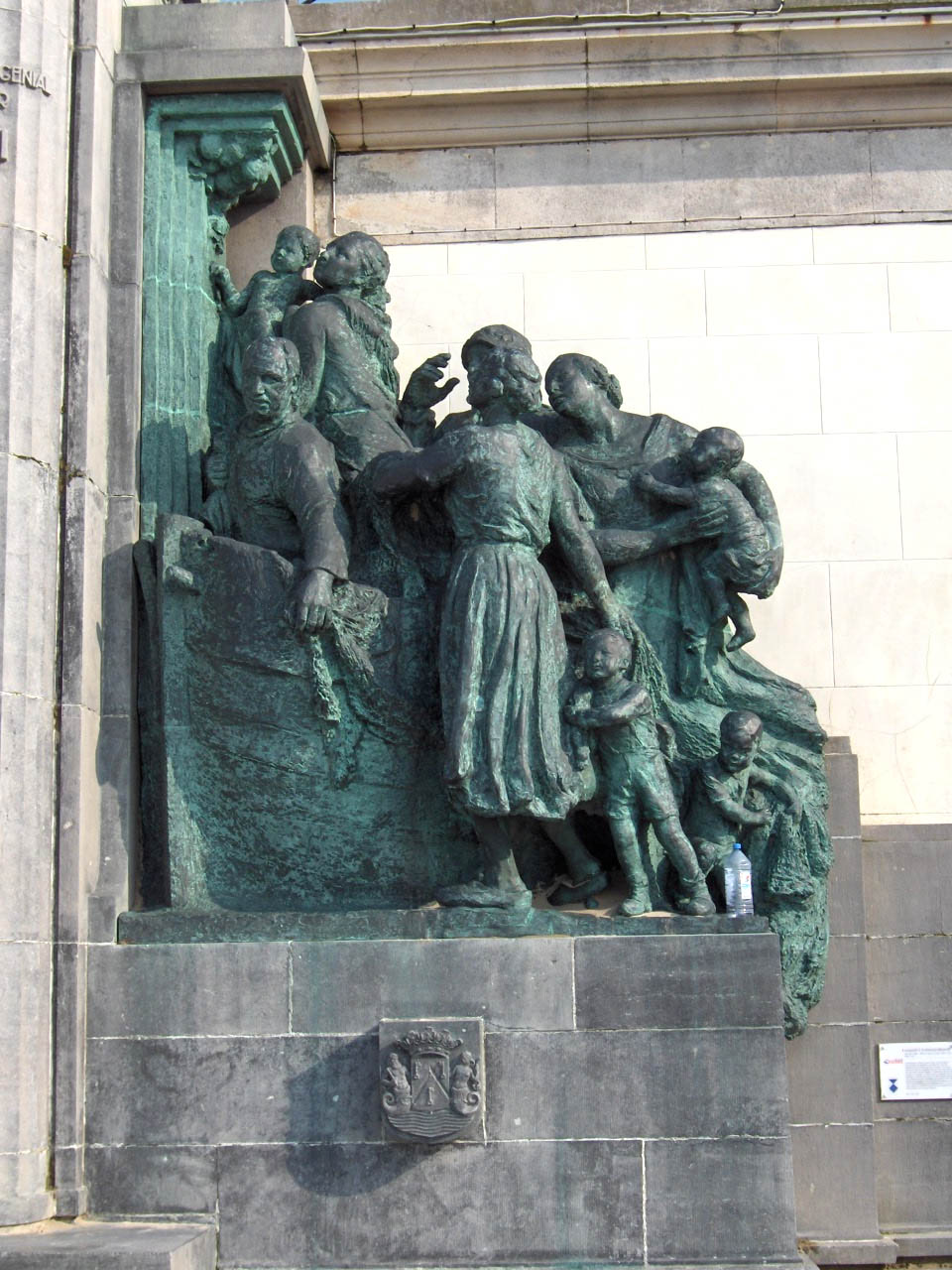
Tribute of the Ostend fishing population

== Controversy ==
=== Congo Free State ===
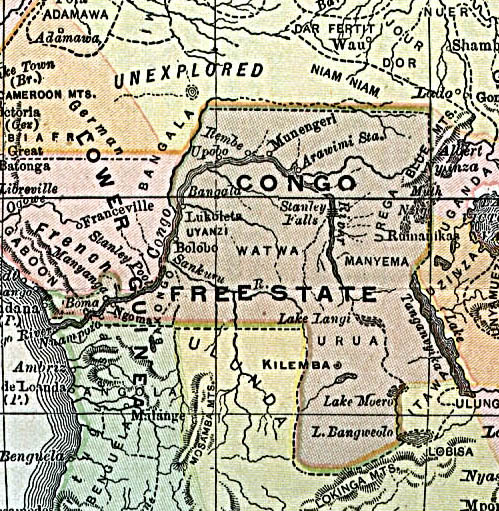
Map of the Congo Free State in 1892

Leopold was the founder and sole owner of the Congo Free State; a private project was undertaken on his behalf. He used the explorer Henry Morton Stanley to help him lay claim to the Congo, an area now known as the Democratic Republic of the Congo. At the Berlin Conference of 1884–85, the colonial nations of Europe authorised his claim by committing the Congo Free State to improve the lives of the native inhabitants.

From the beginning, Leopold ignored these conditions and millions of Congolese inhabitants, including children, were mutilated and killed. He used great sums of the money from this exploitation for public and private construction projects in Belgium during this period. He donated the private buildings to the state before his death.

Leopold extracted a fortune from the Congo, initially by the collection of ivory, and after a rise in the price of rubber in the 1890s, by forced labour from the natives to harvest and process rubber. Under his regime, millions of Congolese people died.

Reports of deaths and abuse led to a major international scandal in the early 20th century, and Leopold was forced by the Belgian government to relinquish control of the colony to the civil administration in 1908.

=== Vandalism ===
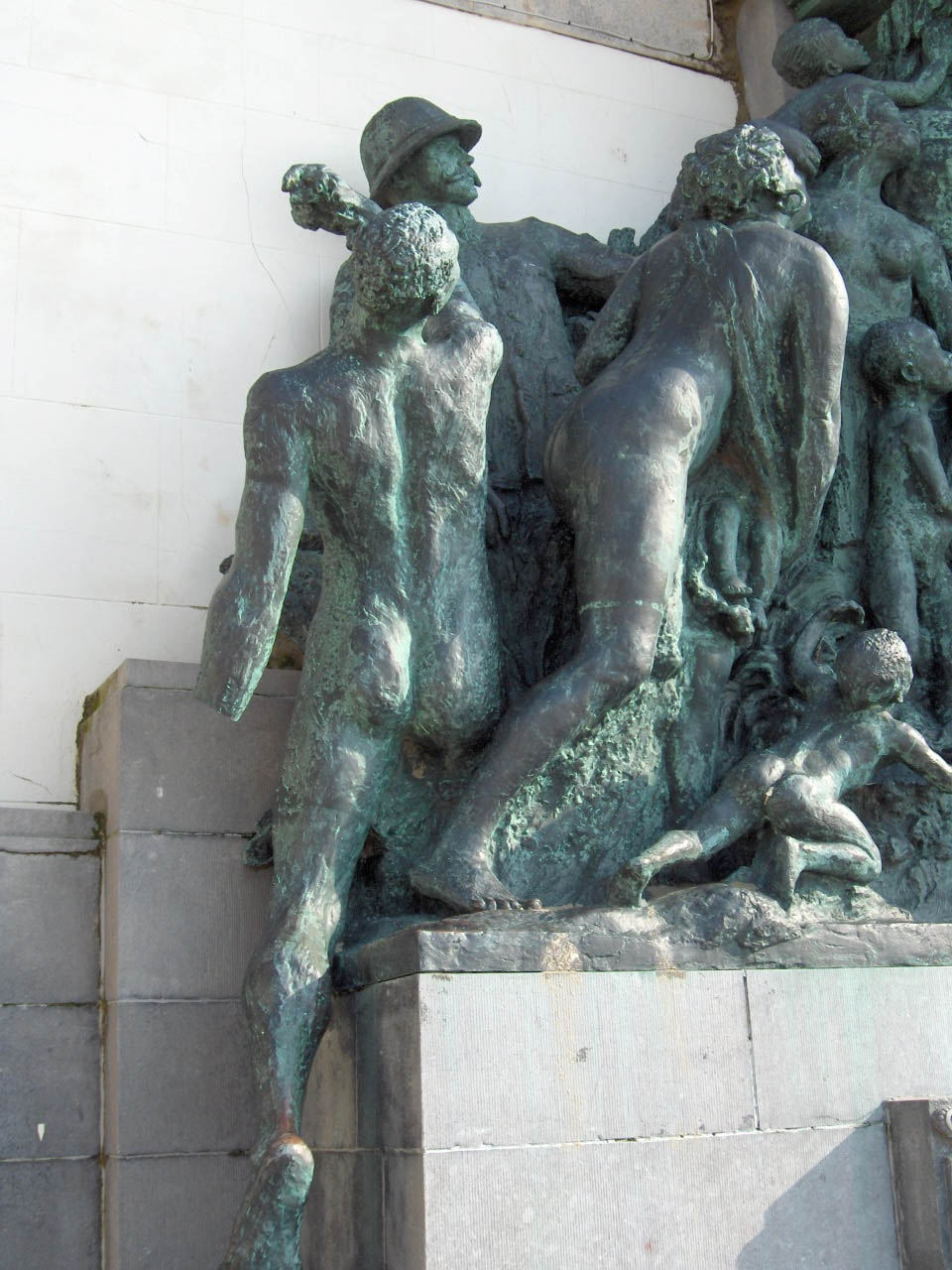
In 2004, the hand of one of the Grateful Congolese was sawed off, in protest against Leopold II's regime.

The monument has been vandalised in 2004 and 2020. In 2004, an activist group, De Stoete Ostendenoare, symbolically cut off a bronze hand from one of the kneeling Congolese slaves who, as part of the Gratitude of the Congolese group in the monument, honours Leopold II. This was a reference to how Congolese slaves' hands were cut off if they did not produce enough rubber during Leopold's colonial regime. The activists were willing to give the hand back if a historically correct sign would be placed near the statue.

The statue was vandalised again in 2020 as part of the global Black Lives Matter movement after the murder of George Floyd. A petition to remove such statues was started to coincide with the 60th anniversary of Congo's independence from Belgium on 30 June 2020. On 9 June 2020, Ostend mayor Bart Tommelein said that the city council "takes the fight against racism very seriously" but "replacing or removing statues will not happen".

== See also ==
- List of statues of Leopold II of Belgium
- Culture of Belgium
- Belgium in the long nineteenth century
