= Timeline of Antwerp =

The following is a timeline of the history of the municipality of Antwerp, Belgium.

== Prior to 13th century ==
- from abt. 150 – abt. 250-270: Gallo-Roman settlement in the centre of Antwerp (at "Willem Ogierplaats").
- abt 700: Oldest mention of the name Andoverpis in a written source : the Vita Eligii dated early 8th century (abt. 700).
- 739: death of Saint Willibrord, bishop.
- 978: Treaty of Margut-sur-Chiers, between France and German empire, the river Scheldt is recognised as the border between Neustria and Lotharingia
- 980 – the German Emperor Otto II awarded Antwerp a margraviate, and build a fortification on the wharf (de burg) with a ditch the "burchtgracht"
- 1100 The Roya is a small natural river that runs outside the "Burchtgracht"
- 1104 The fortification of the "Burcht" is reinforced by Emperor Hendrik IV. The wall's height in increased from 5 metres (16 ft) to 12 metres (39 ft) its thickness from 1.35 metres (4.4 ft) to 2 metres (6.6 ft)
- 1109: Antwerp starts making city canals the "ruienstelsel" From the Koolvliet in the north via, Holenrui, Minderbroedersrui to Suikerrui and Botervliet in the south

== 13th–15th centuries ==
- 1250 – Construction of the second Vleeshuis, city butchery and Guildhouse of the butchers
- 1406 – City becomes part of the Duchy of Brabant.
- 1442 – Guild of Saint Luke granted privileges.
- 1477 – Quaeye Werelt revolt
- 1478
  - Joyous Entry of Maximilian I, Holy Roman Emperor into the city.
  - Violieren chamber of rhetoric founded.
- 1481 – Matt. Van der Goes sets up printing press.
- 1491 – One of the world's "first" illustrated advertisements printed in Antwerp.

== 16th century ==
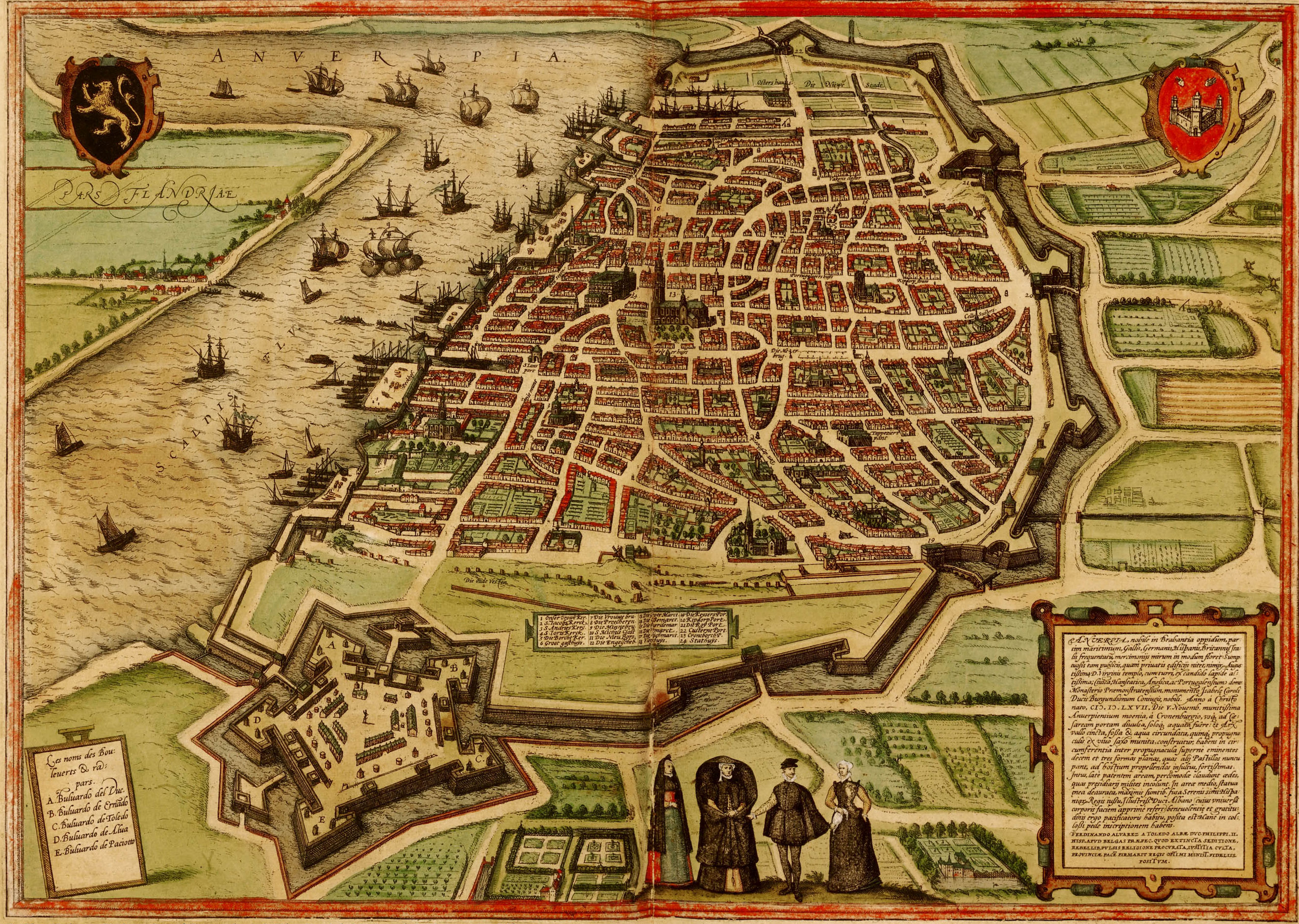
City of Antwerp, 1572

- 1503 – Construction of the third Vleeshuis, current building, city butchery and guildhouse of the butchers .
- 1513 – Guild Hall of the Archers built.
- 1515 – Joyous Entry of Charles V, Holy Roman Emperor into the city.
- 1518 – Notre Dame Cathedral built.
- 1520 – Het Steen fortress rebuilt.
- 1523 – Church of St. Andrew built.
- 1528 – Merten de Keyser (printer) in business (approximate date).
- 1531 – Opening of the Stock Exchange in Antwerp, the first purpose-built exchange.
- 1533 – Lancelot II of Ursel saves the Cathedral from total ruin.
- 1543 – Music publisher Susato in business.
- 1549 – Philip II of Spain visits city.
- 1552 – Girls' orphanage built.
- 1555 – Christophe Plantin (printer) in business.
- 1560s – Antwerp Citadel built.
- 1565 – City Hall built.
- 1566 – August: Protestant Reformation riots.
- 1567 – 13 March: Battle of Oosterweel occurs near city.
- 1568
  - Anthony van Stralen, Lord of Merksem, former mayor is executed..
  - Maison Hanseatique built.
  - Population: 125,000.
- 1570 – Theatrum Orbis Terrarum atlas published.
- 1571 – Church of St. Paul built.
- 1572 – Antwerp Citadel completed.
- 1576 – 4 November: during the Sack of Antwerp, John III van de Werve, Lord of Hovorst gets killed by the Spanish forces.
- 1577 – Antwerp Citadel partially dismantled.
- 1579
  - City joins Union of Utrecht.
  - Hall of the Coopers built.
- 1583 – 17 January: François, Duke of Anjou tries to take city.
- 1584 – July: Siege of Antwerp begins.
- 1585
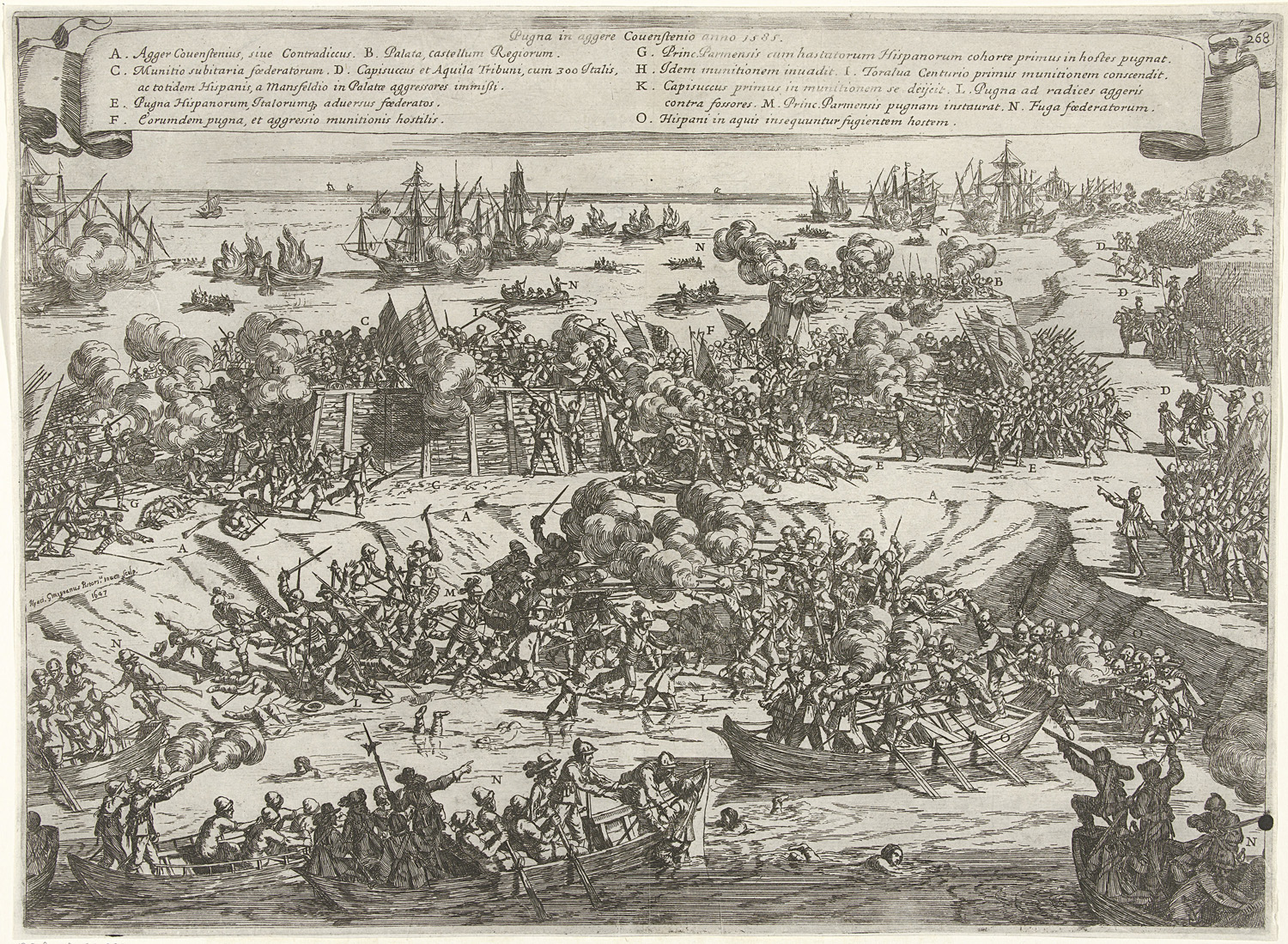
  Defeat of the rebels on the Kouwensteinsedijk, 26 May 1585
  - August: Siege of Antwerp ends; Alexander Farnese, Duke of Parma in power.
  - Population: 85,000.
- 1589
  - Church of the Capuchins built.
  - Population: 55,000.
- 1593 – Hieronymus Verdussen (printer) in business (approximate date).
- 1594 – Joyous Entry of Archduke Ernest of Austria into the city.
- 1599 – Isabella and Albert (Habsburg Netherlands sovereigns) make their Joyous Entry into the city.

== 17th–18th centuries ==
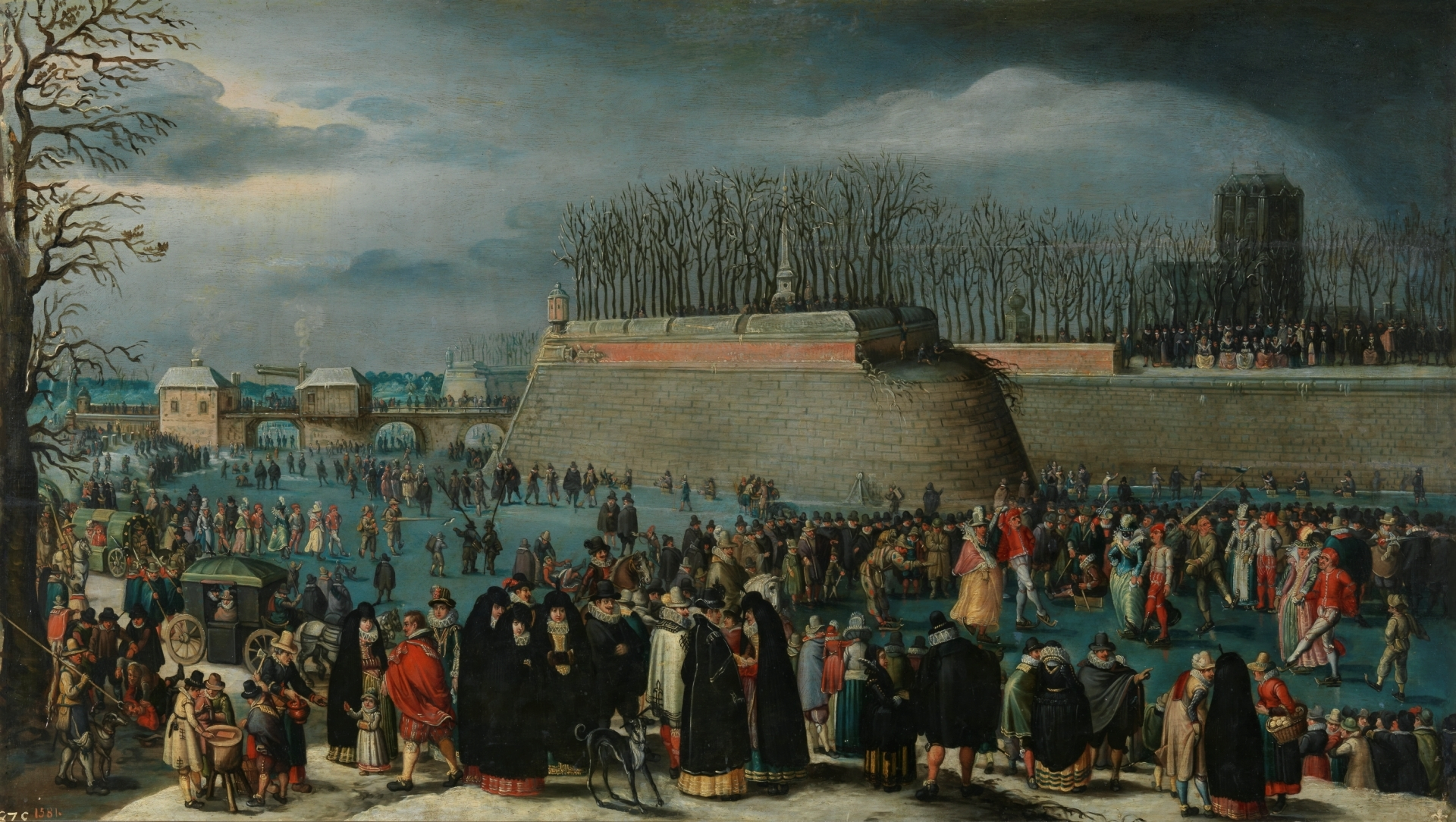
Carnival on Ice at the Kipdorppoort Moats, c. 1620

- 1603 – Nicolaas II Rockox builds the Rockox House.
- 1609 – Twelve Years' Truce signed.
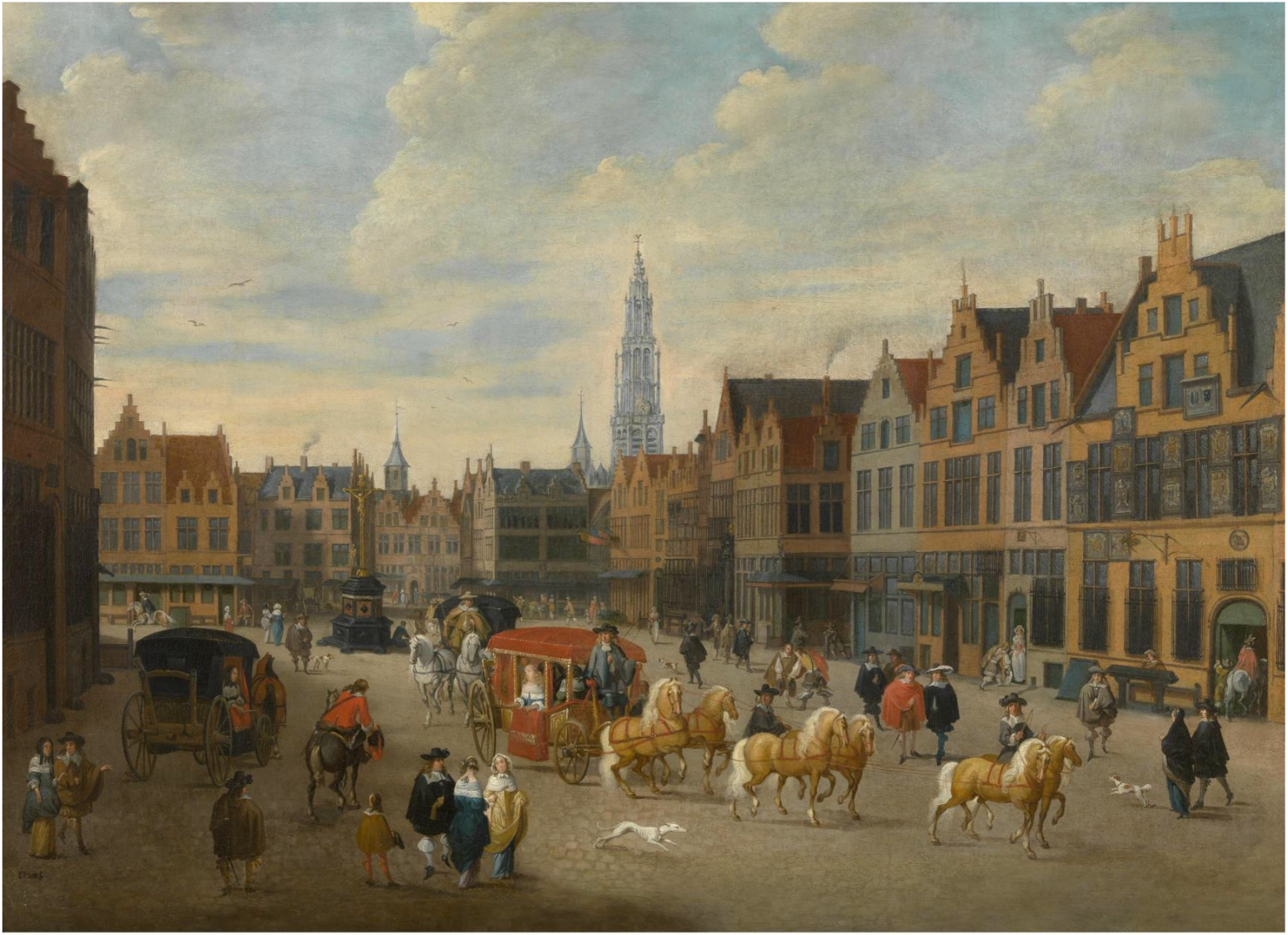
  View of the Meir in Antwerp. Painting by Erasmus de Bie
- 1615 – Church of Augustinians built.
- 1621 – Carolus Borromeuskerk built.
- 1635 – Joyous Entry of Cardinal-Infante Ferdinand into the city.
- 1638 – 20 June: Battle of Kallo.
- 1644 – House of the Tailors rebuilt.
- 1646 – Hall of the Carpenters rebuilt.
- 1646 – Siege of Antwerp by Frederick Henry failed.
- 1648
  - River Scheldt closed to navigation per Treaty of Münster.
  - Joyous Entry of Archduke Leopold Wilhelm of Austria into the city.
- 1656 – St. James' Church built.
- 1663 – Royal Academy of Fine Arts founded.
- 1745 – Royal Residence built on the Meir.
- 1746 – Osterrieth House built on the Meir.
- 1750 – Royal Horticultural and Agricultural Society exhibitions begin (approximate date).
- 1755 – Royal Palace built.
- 1790 – Population: 40,000.
- 1795 – City becomes capital of French département Deux-Nèthes.

== 19th century ==
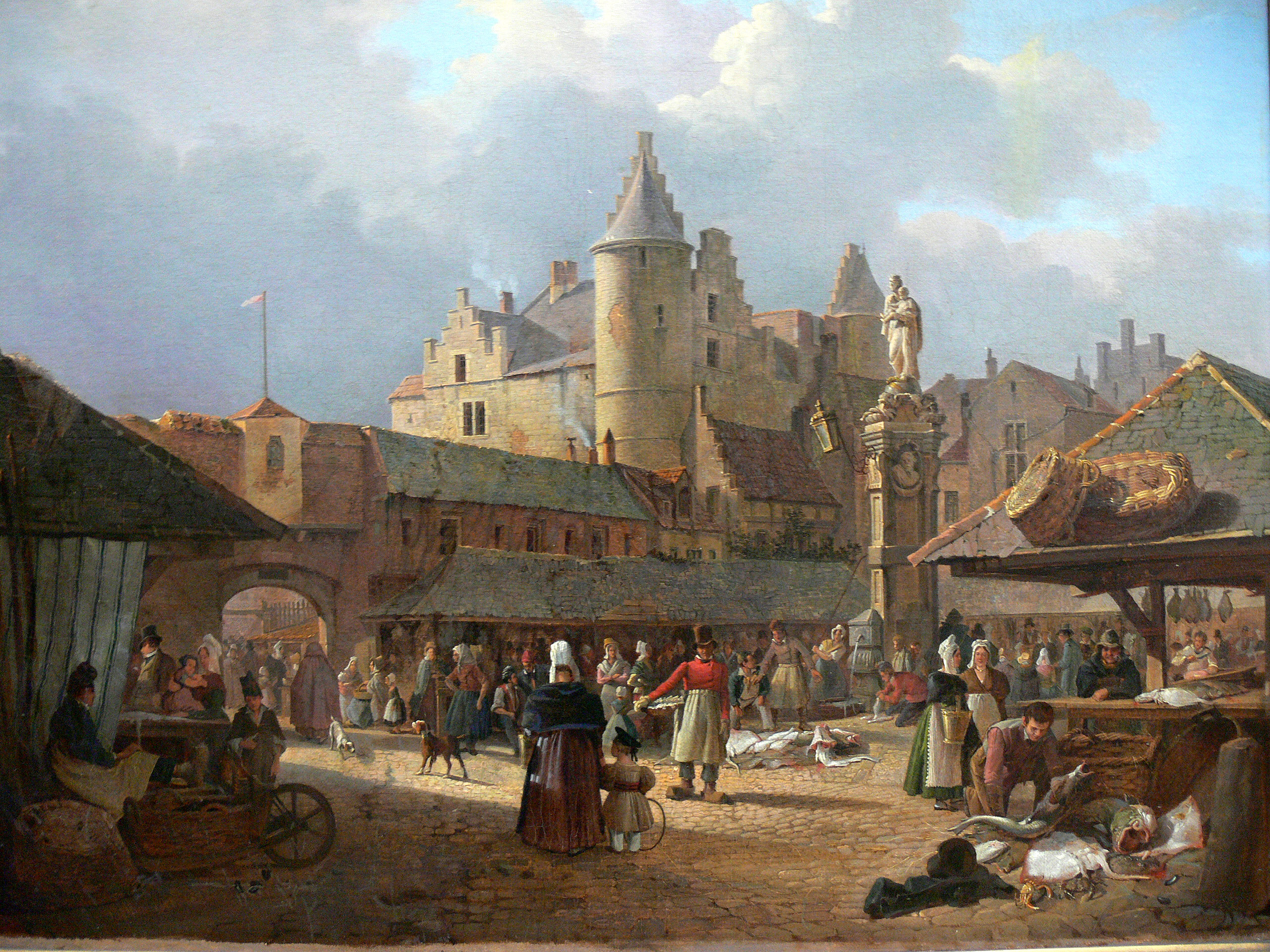
Fish market, c. 1833

- 1802 – Quays built on Schelde River.
- 1805 – City Library opens in City Hall.
- 1810 – Royal Museum of Fine Arts founded.
- 1811 – Bonaparte Dock built.
- 1813 – Willem Dock built.
- 1815 – City becomes part of the Kingdom of the Netherlands.
- 1816 – Jewish Community established.
- 1818 – Fortresses built.
- 1826 – Orangery built in the Botanical Garden.
- 1830
  - Conflict between Belgian insurgents and Dutch forces.
  - Population: 73,506.
- 1832 – November–December: City besieged by French forces.
- 1834
  - Medical Society founded.
  - Theatre Royal built.
- 1843 – Zoological Garden founded.
- 1846
  - Harmoniezaal inaugurated.
  - Population: 88,487.
- 1848 – Jan Frans Loos becomes mayor.
- 1852 – Wuyts art gallery opens (approximate date).
- 1853
  - Institut Saint-Ignace inaugurated.
  - Church of St. George consecrated.
- 1859
  - Berchem and Borgerhout become part of city (approximate date).
  - Old city walls dismantled.
  - Fortress construction begins.
- 1860 – Kattendijk built.
- 1864 – Museum of Antiquities opens.
- 1866 – Cholera epidemic.
- 1867 – School of Music founded.
- 1870 – Fort Merxem constructed.
- 1871 – International Geographical Congress held.
- 1872 – Exchange building and Flemish Theatre built.
- 1873 – Horsecar trams begin operating.
- 1874 – Demolition of Antwerp Citadel begins.
- 1876 – Royal Geographical Society of Antwerp founded.
- 1877 – Plantin-Moretus Museum opens.
- 1879 – Population: 173,600.
- 1880 – Royal Antwerp Football Club formed.
- 1881 – Antwerp Water Works constructed.
- 1883 – Library building opens.
- 1884 – Royal Atheneum (school) built.
- 1885
  - Exposition Universelle d'Anvers (world's fair) held.
  - Temperance conference held.
- 1891 – Gazet van Antwerpen newspaper begins publication.
- 1892 – Société Anversoise du Commerce au Congo in business.
- 1893
  - Koninklijke Vlaamse Opera (Flemish Opera) founded.
  - Hollandse Synagoge built.
- 1894 – Exposition Internationale d'Anvers (world's fair) and Universal Peace Congress held.
- 1895 – Compagnie Belge Maritime du Congo in business.
- 1896 – National Archives' Antwerp branch founded.
- 1897 – De Nieuwe Gazet newspaper begins publication.
- 1898 – Royal Conservatory established.

== 20th century ==
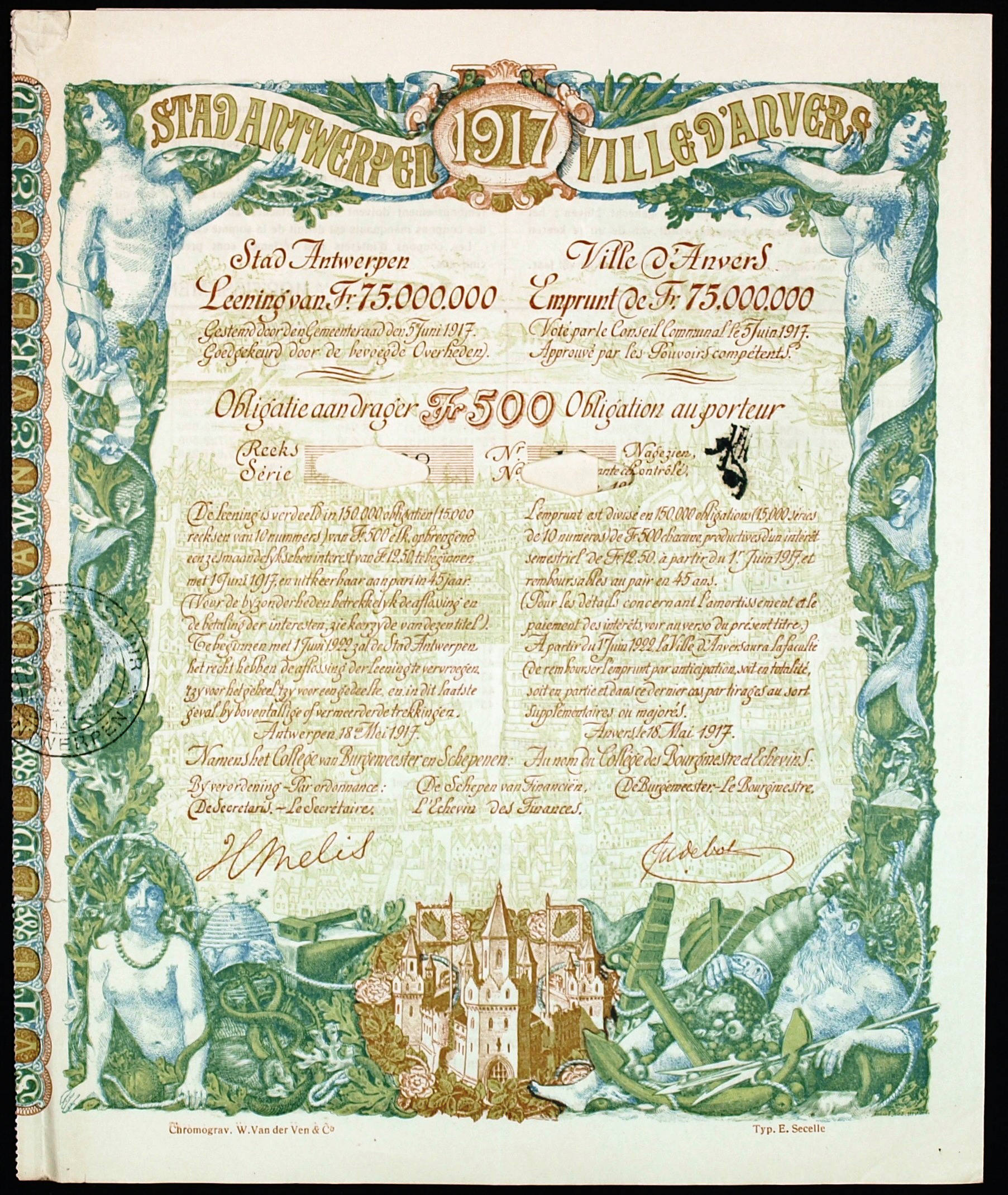
Bond of the City of Antwerp, issued 18. Mai 1917

- 1902 – Electric trams begin operating.
- 1903 – World Gymnastics Championships held.
- 1904 – Museum Mayer van den Bergh built.
- 1905 – Antwerpen-Centraal railway station and "America dock" open.
- 1906 – Fort Breendonk built.
- 1907 – Eisenmann Synagogue built.
- 1910
  - Population: 361,723.
  - St. Boniface Church consecrated.
- 1914 – September–October: Siege of Antwerp; German occupation begins.
- 1920
  - 1920 Summer Olympics held.
  - Compagnie Financière Belge des Pétroles headquartered in city.
  - Colonial school and Société Belge des Bétons founded
- 1921 – Schoonselhof cemetery established.
- 1923 – Airport opens.
- 1928 – Antwerpsche Diamantkring established.
- 1930 – Eeuwfeestkliniek (hospital) built.
- 1931 – Antwerp Book Fair begins.
- 1932 – Boerentoren built.
- 1933 – Museum of Flemish Literature founded.
- 1940 – May: German occupation begins.
- 1944
  - 4 September: Liberation by the British 11th Armoured Division.
  - October–November: Battle of the Scheldt.
- 1946 – Rubens House museum opens.
- 1966
  - Sporthal Arena built.
  - Wide White Space Gallery opens.
- 1967 – Antwerp International School established.
- 1968 – De Tijd newspaper begins publication.
- 1969
  - Jazz Middelheim festival begins.
  - Kennedytunnel opens.
  - Royal Ballet of Flanders established.
- 1970 – Chicagoblok built.
- 1975
  - Antwerp Pre-metro begins operating.
  - International Gemological Institute headquartered in city.
  - Cinderella´s Ballroom opened
- 1977 – 't Fornuis restaurant in business.
- 1981 – Zeno X gallery opens.
- 1983 – Berchem, Borgerhout, Deurne, Ekeren, Hoboken, Merksem, and Wilrijk become part of the city of Antwerp.
- 1985 – Museum of Modern Art founded.
- 1989 – Berendrecht Lock constructed.
- 1994
  - Laus Polyphoniae festival begins.
  - Switel Hotel fire
- 1995 – City website launched (Digitale Metropool Antwerpen).

== 21st century ==
- 2003
  - Patrick Janssens becomes mayor.
  - University of Antwerp established.
- 2004
  - Fotomuseum Antwerp opens.
  - City designated a UNESCO World Book Capital.
- 2006
  - 0110 concert held.
  - FelixArchief (city archives) and Law Courts building open.
- 2007
  - Antwerp World Diamond Centre established.
  - Stadsfeestzaal shopping center opens.
- 2011
  - Museum aan de Stroom opens.
  - Population: 507,007.
- 2013 – Bart De Wever becomes mayor.
- 2025 - Els van Doesburg replaced Bart de Wever as mayor.

== See also ==
- History of Antwerp
- List of mayors of Antwerp
- List of schools in Antwerp
- List of parks in Antwerp
- List of historical monuments of Antwerp/Historical Center
- Timelines of other municipalities in Belgium: Bruges, Brussels, Ghent, Leuven, Liège
- History of urban centers in the Low Countries

== Bibliography ==
Published in the 18th-19th century

- "Anvers". Gazetteer of the Netherlands. Attributed to Clement Cruttwell. London: G.G.J. and J. Robinson. 1794.
- "Antwerp". Galignani's Traveller's Guide through Holland and Belgium (4th ed.). Paris: A. and W. Galignani. 1822. hdl:2027/njp.32101073846667.
- "Antwerp". Penny Magazine of the Society for the Diffusion of Useful Knowledge. London: Charles Knight. 22 December 1832.
- "Antwerp". The Traveller's Guide through Belgium. Brussels: A.D. Wahlen. 1835. OCLC 32329300.
- Alexandre Ferrier de Tourette (1840). "Anvers". Belgium historical and picturesque. Translated by Addison. Brussels: Hauman.
- "Wayside Pictures through France, Belgium, and Holland: the Shores of the Low Countries; Antwerp". Bentley's Miscellany. London: Richard Bentley: 624. 1849.
- J. Willoughby Rosse (1858). "Antwerp". Index of Dates ... Facts in the Chronology and History of the World. London: H.G. Bohn. hdl:2027/uva.x030807786 – via HathiTrust.
- Feestalbum van Antwerpen (in Dutch). Antwerpen: Buschmann. 1864.
- John Ramsay McCulloch (1869), "Antwerp", in Hugh G. Reid (ed.), A Dictionary, Practical, Theoretical and Historical of Commerce and Commercial Navigation, London: Longmans, Green, hdl:2027/njp.32101075979870
- Visitors Universal Handybook and Guide to Antwerp, Brussels, Waterloo, Ghent, Bruges, Liege, etc. etc (5th ed.). Antwerp: John De Wit & Joris. 1884.
- W. Pembroke Fetridge (1885), "Antwerp", Harper's Hand-book for Travellers in Europe and the East, New York: Harper & Brothers
- Walter D. Welford (October 1895), "Belgium through a Hand Camera", Photographic Times
- Norddeutscher Lloyd (1896), "Antwerp", Guide through Germany, Austria-Hungary, Italy, Switzerland, France, Belgium, Holland and England, Berlin: J. Reichmann & Cantor, OCLC 8395555

Published in the 20th century

- Grant Allen (1904), Belgium: its Cities, Boston: Page, OL 24136954M
- "Antwerp", Belgium and Holland, including the grand-duchy of Luxembourg (15th ed.), Leipzig: Karl Baedeker, 1910, OCLC 397759
- Henri Zondervan, ed. (1914), "Antwerpen", Winkler Prins' Geillustreerde Encyclopaedie (in Dutch), vol. 1 (4th ed.), Amsterdam: Uitgevers-Maatschappy „Elsevier“, hdl:2027/mdp.39015068310187
- "Antwerp", Traveller's Handbook for Belgium and the Ardennes, London: T. Cook & Son, 1921
