= King Albert Park =

King Albert Park or Koning Albertpark may refer to:

- King Albert Park, Ghent, a city park in Ghent, Belgium
- King Albert Park MRT station, a train station in Singapore
- Koning Albertpark, Antwerp, an urban park in Antwerp, Belgium
