= Zuid, Antwerp =

Neighborhood in Antwerp, Belgium

The Zuid (Dutch for "South") is a southern neighborhood in the city center of Antwerp, abutting the Scheldt River. The Zuid had a revival in the mid-1980s and is now composed of buildings in the Art Nouveau and Modern architecture styles. Zuid contains numerous cafés, restaurants and shops, as well as three museums, two art centres, and many commercial art galleries.

== History ==
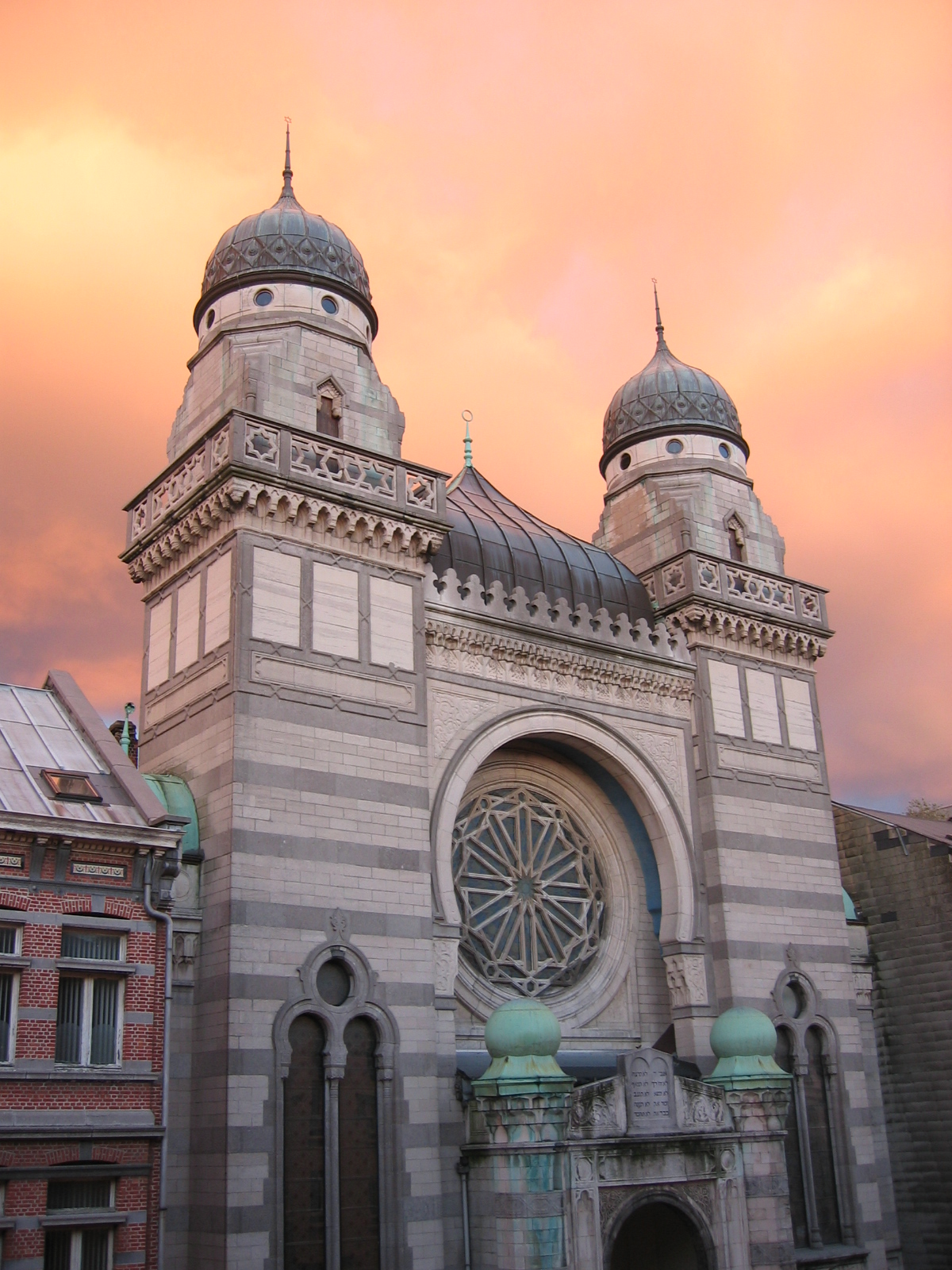
The Synagogue in the Bouwmeestersstraat on a winter evening

The neighbourhood of Zuid, or Antwerp South, emerged following the dismantling of the Antwerp Citadel, colloquially known as the Zuidkasteel. The fort was originally constructed by the Spanish, and the demolition process began in 1874. The layout of the streets was officially approved through a Royal Decree in 1875. The design of the neighbourhood is believed to have been influenced by Georges-Eugène Haussmann, earning it the moniker "Le Petit Paris". Concurrently with the approval of the street plan, the excavation of the Zuiderdokken (Southern Docks) commenced. Over the subsequent 25 years, the area saw significant development, with the majority of its key public buildings reaching completion in the last decade of the 19th century. Historic events in the area include:

- Two World Fairs, held in 1885 and 1894
- The completion of the Royal Museum of Fine Arts in 1890
- The completion of the "Dutch" Synagogue in the Bouwmeestersstraat in 1893 (see History of the Jews in Antwerp)
- The opening of the Parein Biscuit Factory in the Brusselsestraat in 1894
- The completion of the St. Michael's Church (Amerikalei) in 1897
- The completion of the buildings of the State Commercial College (Handelshogeschool) (Schildersstraat) likewise in 1897. It now houses a nursery school after being the home of the Higher Institute for Translators and Interpreters for 53 years.
- The opening of the South Station in 1898

The designation "Petit Paris", along with its well-regarded street layout, monuments, and cultural sites, made "het Zuid" or "Le Midi" a sought-after residential area up until the Second World War. Throughout the conflict, the neighbourhood experienced significant damage due to V bomb attacks, with the initial bomb impacting Antwerp, striking at the intersection of Schildersstraat and Leopold De Waelplaats.

Following the war, the area entered a prolonged period of decline. Contributing factors to this downturn included suburbanization, the downturn of the Southern Docks, and the shutdown and subsequent demolition in 1965 of the South Station.

The affordability of the area made it appealing to immigrants and individuals in search of a bohemian lifestyle. This economic accessibility enabled Anny De Decker to establish the "Wide White Space Gallery" (1966–1976) on the ground floor of Het Bootje, an architecturally diverse building situated at the corner of Schildersstraat and Plaatsnijdersstraat, which is now recognized as a protected monument.

In 1968 and 1969, the Southern Docks were filled in and repurposed as a parking area. The construction of a new building for the Court of Appeals on the former entrance to these docks, along with the demolition of the Hippodrome in 1972, further diminished the prominence of "het Zuid," relegating it to a district noted only for its residual charm.

Ultimately, the inherent appeal of the neighbourhood, along with a shift in attitudes towards city living, contributed to a revival in the area's prospects. There was a resurgence of interest in the Zuid after the International Rubens Year in 1977, which attracted numerous visitors to South Antwerp.

== Museums ==
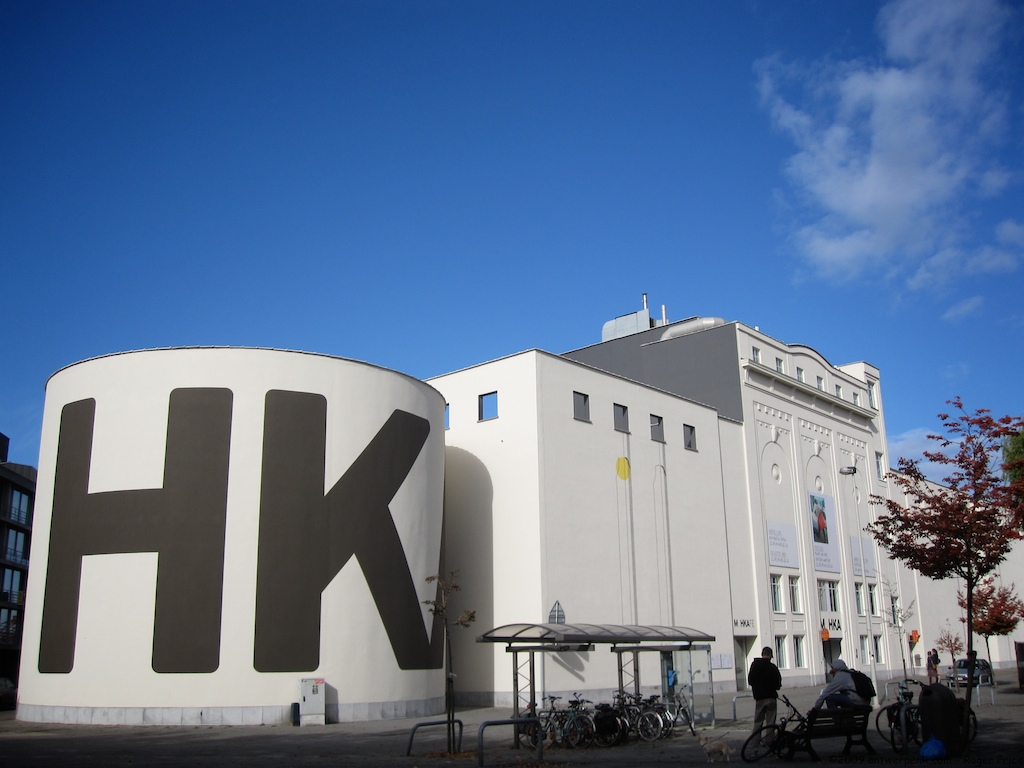
Museum of Modern Art, Antwerp.

- Royal Museum of Fine Arts

The building dates from 1890 and was constructed specifically to house the city's growing collection of art. The collection includes many Dutch and Belgian masterpieces from the 15th century onwards, by artists such as Jan van Eyck, Rogier van der Weyden, Rembrandt, and Rubens as well as several works by Ensor, Magritte, and Delvaux.

- Museum van Hedendaagse Kunst Antwerpen

This is the contemporary art museum of the city and one of the largest of its kind in Belgium. The museum holds a permanent collection of contemporary art by Belgian and international artists, a cinema, and a specialized library. The architect responsible was Michel Grandsard. He also designed the museum's new wing (1997). Since 1992, the director of the museum has been Bart de Baere.

- Fotomuseum

This museum has a historical and contemporary collection of photography that is given a new presentation every year. Alongside the collection are frequently changing photography exhibitions, film projections, and lectures. It also publishes a magazine "FMM" in Dutch that presents articles on photography with a particular emphasis on fine art photography. The museum opened in 2004.

== Monuments ==
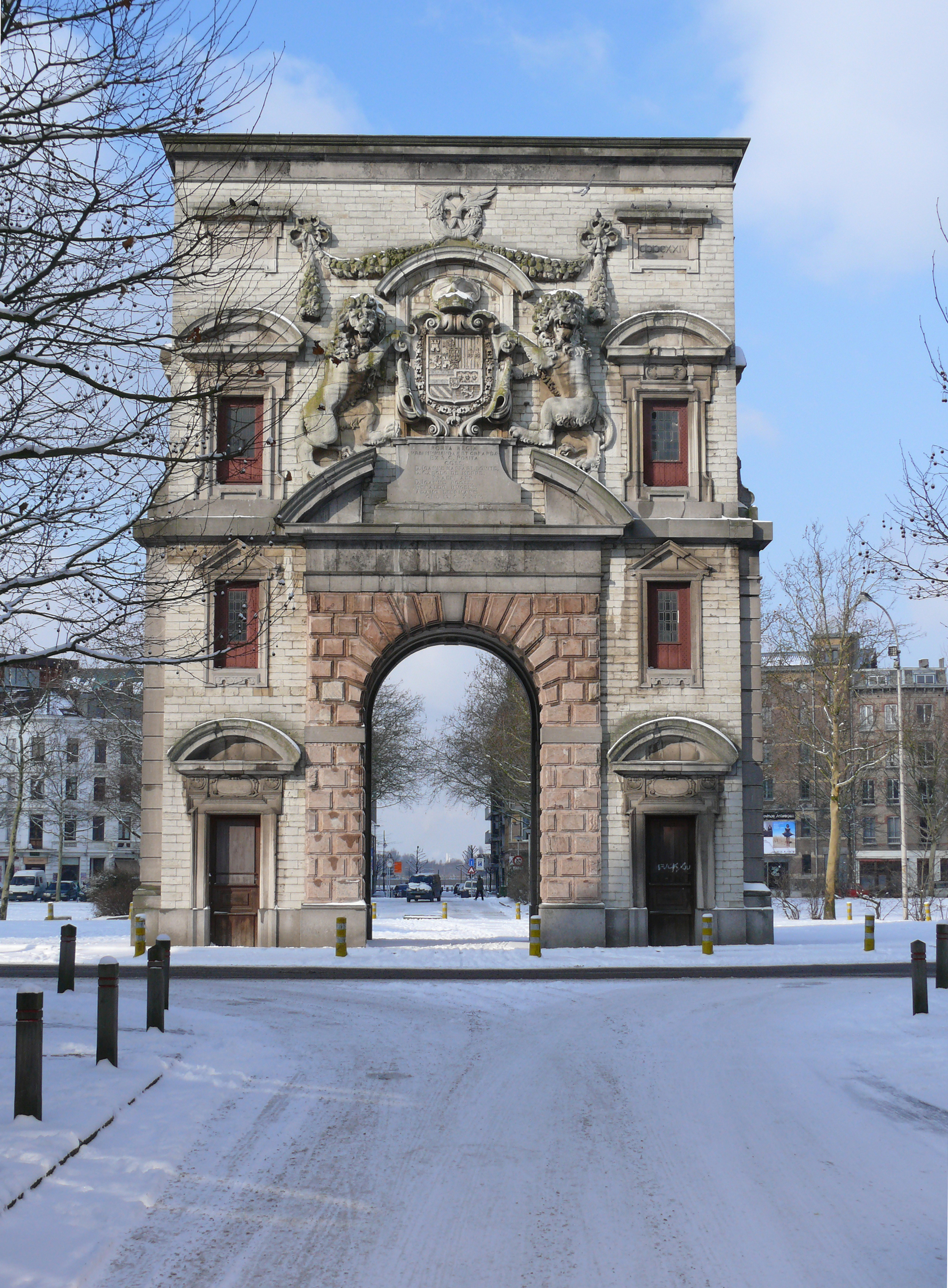
Waterpoort

Several of the area's squares have public monuments. These include a statue on the Marnixplaats, a fountain on the Lambermontplaats, and a statue on the Baron Dhanislei. Of more general interest, however, is the "Waterpoort" (Water Gate), based on a design by Rubens, and which stands on the Sint-Gillisplaats.

On 6 July 2012, a new statue of William of Orange (William the Silent) and Marnix of Sint-Aldegondis was inaugurated in the gardens of the Royal Museum of Fine Arts. The statue is surrounded by a number of stelae commemorating key conflicts leading to the Thirty Years' War. The monument stands on or close to what was once the stronghold defended by both men against the Spanish aggressors.

== Arts centres ==
In 1987 the theatre company "De Internationale Nieuwe Scene" moved into the derelict "Zuiderpershuis". Since then, this former hydraulic power station has become an important centre for the arts.

As its name might suggest, De Monty was formerly a local cinema and parish hall. It is now a venue for numerous travelling companies and groups of all kinds.

Raamtheater shared part of the large complex of buildings occupied by the Hoger Instituut van Vertalers en Tolken, the language department of Hogeschool Antwerpen, now Artesia.

== Innovation, business, and new development ==
Once the Southern Docks fell into disuse the attraction of the area as a location for industrial and semi-industrial activities declined. This, combined with strict zoning laws, resulted in virtually all the small workshops and warehousing operations having to shut down or relocate.

Apart from existing attractions such as the housing stock and agreeable street plan, an important factor in reestablishing the elan of the neighborhood has been the availability of land for development. This has come from the demolition or conversion of industrial and semi-industrial buildings, the abandonment and/or redevelopment of buildings such as the former Hippodrome, and the demolition of the South Station. The derelict marshalling yards on the southern edge of the neighborhood are being developed into a sustainable development called Circulair Zuid including 2,200 homes between 2018 and 2030.

At present the area is served by a single supermarket on the ground floor of the redeveloped Hippodrome site. A recent development is the new Palace of Justice law courts complex on the former South Station site. This award-winning project, designed by the Richard Rogers Partnership in association with VKStudio and Ove Arup & Partners, opened in 2007.

The presence of this new complex has encouraged lawyers, and various support services to seek premises nearby. Finally, a number of IT start-ups have been attracted by the area's fashionable image in recent years. Whether the trading atmosphere will prove to be congenial in the longer term remains to be seen.
