= Zuid =

Zuid may refer to:

- Zuid, Antwerp, Netherlands
- Zuid, Suriname, a resort in the Para District
