= Lohaus =

Lohaus is a German surname. Notable people with the surname include:

- Bernd Lohaus (1940–2010), German sculptor, painter and draftsman
- Brad Lohaus (born 1964), American basketball player
