= Harmonie Club (disambiguation) =

The Harmonie Club is an exclusive private social club in New York City, U.S., founded in 1852.

Harmonie Club may also refer to:

- Harmonie Club (Detroit, Michigan), a historic building in downtown Detroit, Michigan, U.S.
- Harmony Society, Batavia (Dutch: Societeit de Harmonie), a former elite social club in Batavia, Dutch East Indies

== See also ==
- Harmoniezaal Antwerp
