= Pshevorsk (Hasidic dynasty) =

Polish Hasidic dynasty

Pshevorsk Hasidic Dynasty
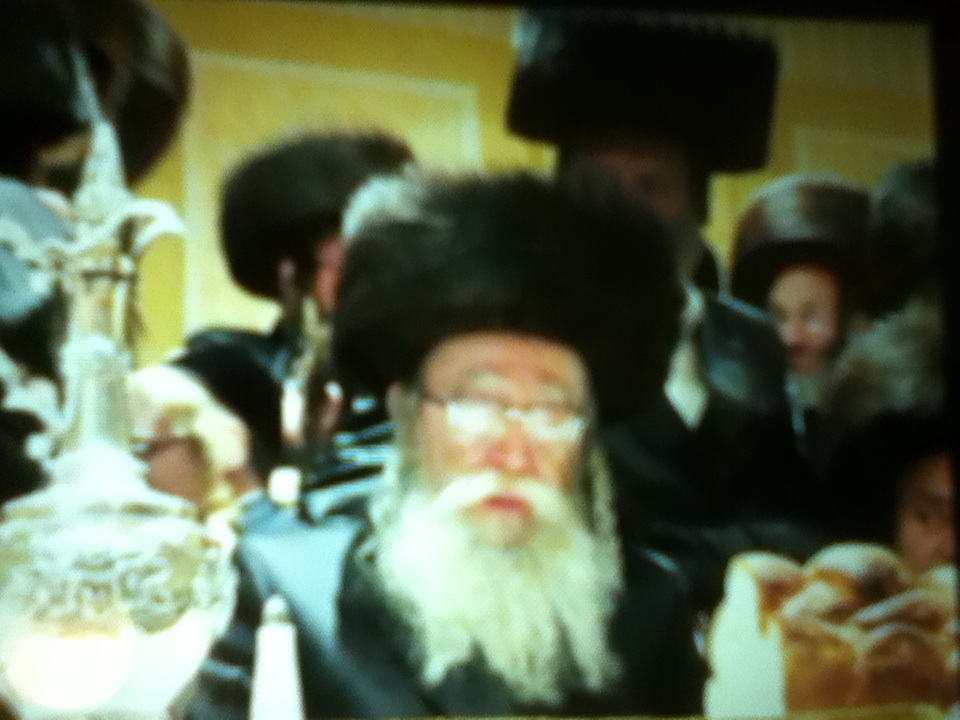
- The Rebbe at a wedding

Founder
- Rabbi Moshe Yitzchak Gevirzman

Regions with significant populations
- Belgium, United Kingdom, United States, Israel

Religions
- Hasidic Judaism

Related ethnic groups
- Tsanz, Satmar

Pshevorsk is a small Hasidic movement based in Antwerp, Belgium, led by the Leiser rabbinical dynasty, originating in the Polish town of Przeworsk.

== History ==
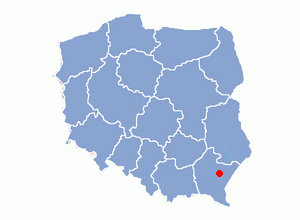
The town of Przeworsk in Poland.

The first Rebbe, Moshe Yitzchak, was a son of Rabbi Naftoli Elimelech, son of Rabbi Avrohom of Gorlice, who was a great-grandson of Elimelech of Lizhensk. After his marriage, he settled in Przeworsk, Poland. He survived the Holocaust after being exiled by the Soviets to Siberia and - when the situation in Cracow became untenable, due to death threats from the Polish population - he moved to Paris where he held court in the Pletzel. In 1956, he settled in Antwerp, where he lived until he died on Yom Kippur in 1976 (year 5737 in the Hebrew calendar). His son-in-law, Rebbe Yaakov Leiser, succeeded him. Leiser served as Pshevorsker Rebbe until 1998, when he died and was succeeded by his son Leibish Leiser, As of 2023 the Rebbe of Pshevorsk.

Yaakov Leiser is buried in Putte, Netherlands, because a Belgian law makes it possible to re-use or build on top of gravesites. As such, the Jews of Antwerp have traditionally been buried in Putte, where the sanctity of gravesites is assured.

== Activities ==
On Jewish holidays, such as Rosh Hashanah ("new year"), hundreds of Pshevorsker Hasidim, and also other Hasidim such as Vizhnitz and Satmar, come to Antwerp to pray at the Pshevorsker prayer gatherings, which are usually held in a large wedding hall. The Pshevorsker's headquarters is the beis midrash ("study hall") known as Beis Yitzchok, at Mercatorstraat 56 in Antwerp.

There are organized groups of Pshevorsk Hasidim in London and also in Manchester, and groups in the United States and Israel. A shul was built in London, where the Rebbe's son serves as the Rav. There is a shul in Jerusalem too.

== Ideology ==
Ideologically, Pshevorsk is a combination of four different offshoots of Tsanz. R' Itzik'l was an ardent follower of the fourth Rebbe of Belz, [((Reb Aaron Rokeach]]) and after he left this world was a close student of the Satmar Rebbe (Rabbi Yoel Teitelbaum). The current Rebbe continues the close ties with Satmar and agrees with their anti-Zionist views.

== Lineage ==
- Rebbe Moshe Yitzchak (Reb Itzikl) Gevirzman of Pshevorsk (1881–1976)
  - Rebbe Yaakov (Reb Yankele) Leiser of Pshevorsk (1907–1998), son-in-law of Reb Itzikl
    - Rebbe Leibish Leiser of Pshevorsk, present Pshevorsker Rebbe, son of Reb Yankele

== See also ==
- Jewish Community of Antwerp
