= Harmoniepark =

Park in Antwerp, Belgium

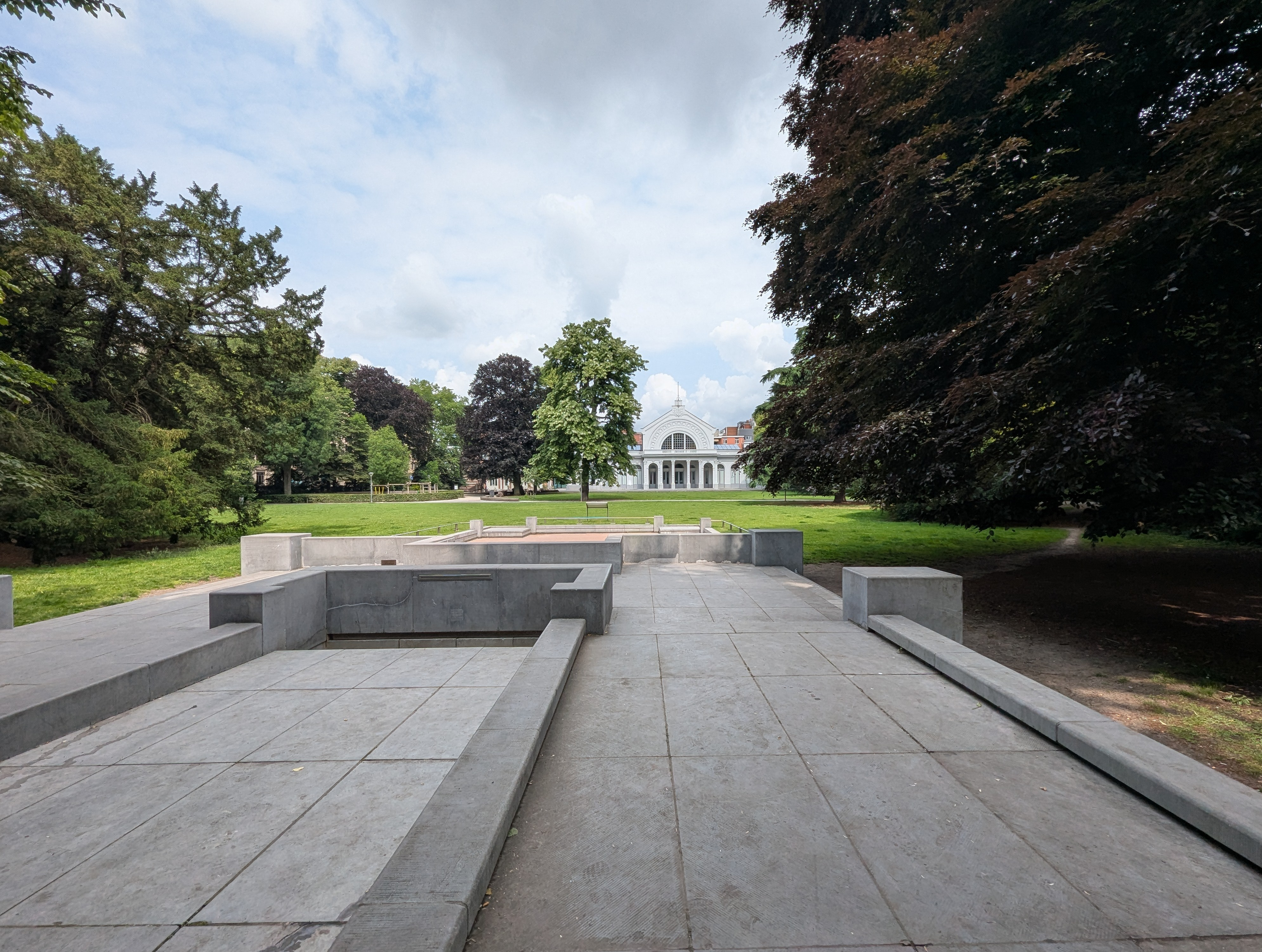
- Harmoniepark Antwerp
- Interactive map of Harmoniepark
- Type: Urban park
- Location: Antwerp, Belgium
- Coordinates: 51.20171°N 4.41137°E
- Created: 1846
- Operator: City of Antwerp
- Status: Open year-round

Harmoniepark is a public park located in Antwerp, Belgium. The park surrounds the historic Harmonie Hall, a neoclassical concert building constructed in the 19th century. It serves as a green space in a densely built urban setting and plays an important role in the cultural and historical identity of the neighborhood.

== History ==
The origins of Harmoniepark date back to 1846, when it was designed as part of a leisure complex for Antwerp's bourgeoisie. The central feature of the park was the Harmoniezaal (Harmonie Hall), a prestigious music venue intended for concerts and social gatherings.

The park and hall were originally commissioned by the Maatschappij der Nieuwe Harmonie, a musical society formed by influential citizens. The site remained a center of cultural life throughout the 19th and early 20th centuries.

== Decline and restoration ==
During the second half of the 20th century, the Harmoniezaal suffered neglect and damage, eventually falling into disrepair. The park also lost its former prominence due to urban development.

A large-scale restoration effort began in the 2010s, including architectural renovation of the Harmoniezaal, redesign of the surrounding park, and integration into the broader “De Grote Verbinding” urban renewal project. The building was refurbished to house administrative offices while preserving its historical features.

== Architecture and features ==
The Harmoniezaal is an example of neoclassical architecture, featuring a grand portico, large symmetrical windows, and decorative reliefs. The surrounding park includes landscaped gardens, walking paths, and a variety of mature trees. The hall is occasionally used for events and community functions.

In the southern corner of Harmoniepark stands the Peter Benoit Monument, an Art Deco fountain designed by architect Henry van de Velde in honor of the Flemish composer Peter Benoit (1834–1901). Originally located on the Frankrijklei in front of the Antwerp Opera House, the fountain was relocated to Harmoniepark in 1951. It was officially classified as a protected monument in 1997.

The centerpiece of the fountain is a stone harp, symbolizing Benoit's contributions to Flemish music. After more than three decades of inactivity, the monument was restored and brought back into operation in May 2017, with water once again flowing from the harp.

Peter Benoit is regarded as one of the most influential Flemish musicians of the 19th century. His role in the cultural identity of Flanders has been likened to that of Hendrik Conscience in literature—Benoit was "the man who taught his people to sing."

== Cultural significance ==
The site has long served as a symbol of civic pride in Antwerp and remains a reference point for the city’s musical and architectural heritage. The name “Harmonie” continues to be associated with the neighborhood and several local institutions.

== See also ==
- List of parks in Antwerp
