= George Floyd protests in Belgium =

Protests in Belgium inspired by George Floyd

- Part of George Floyd protests
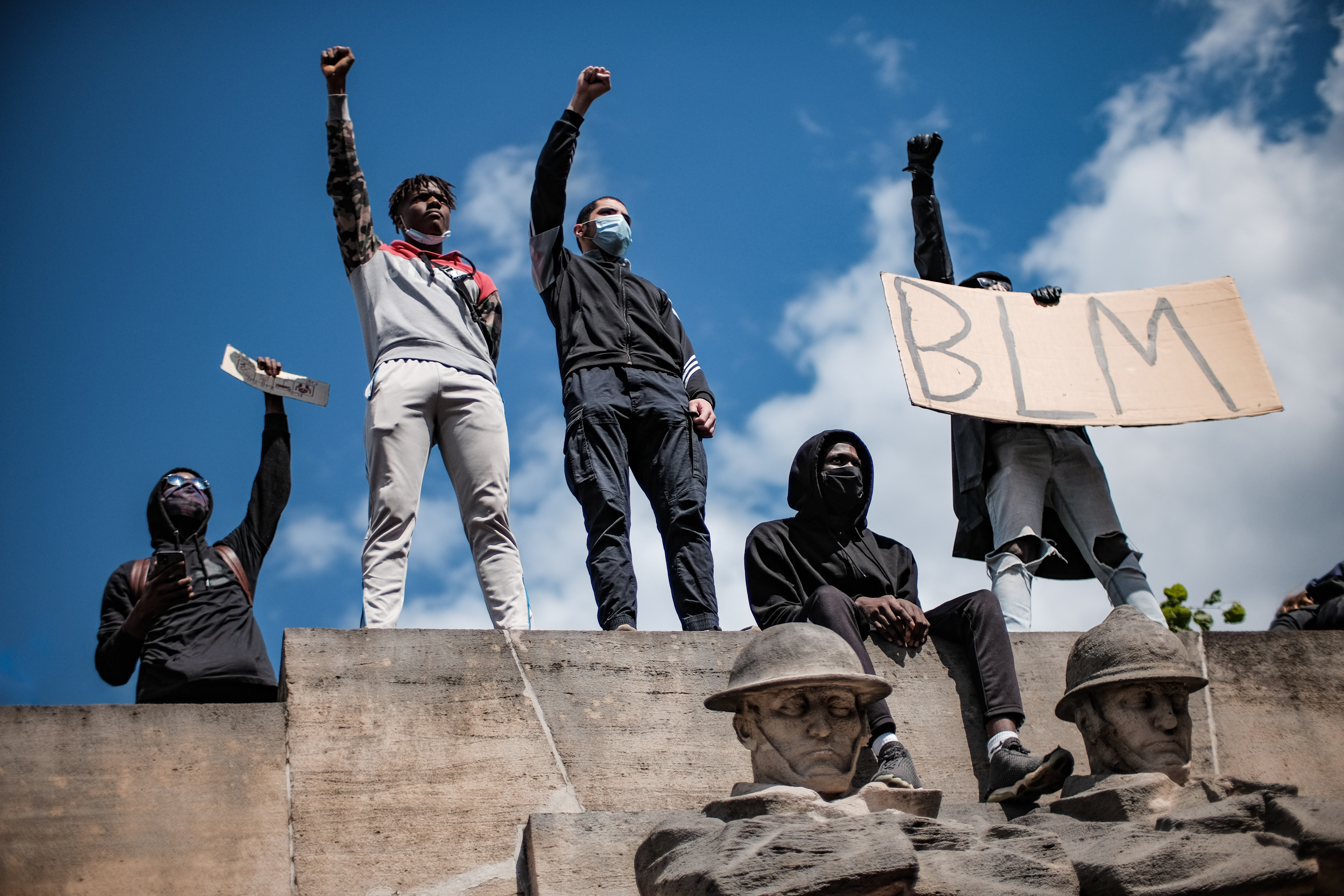
- Protests in Brussels on 7 June 2020
- Date: 1 June 2020 – 2021
- Location: Belgium
- Caused by: Reaction to the murder of George Floyd; Decolonisation of public space

Cities in Belgium in which a protest with about 100 or more participants was held

Shortly after protests seeking justice for George Floyd, an African-American who was murdered during a police arrest, began in the United States, people in Belgium formed their own demonstrations to show solidarity with the American protesters and to demonstrate against issues with police or racism. Vigils and protests of up to thousands of participants took place nationwide.

== Timeline ==
=== 1 June ===
- Brussels: Around 50 people protested at the Place de la Monnaie, despite the event having been cancelled by its organizers due to coronavirus restrictions.
- Ghent: About 500 people protested at the Sint-Pietersplein.

=== 6 June ===
- Liège: About 700 people protested in an anti-racist march, despite coronavirus restrictions.
- Antwerp: About 700 people protested in solidarity with the Black Lives Matter movement.

=== 7 June ===
- Antwerp: About 1,200 people protested in an anti-racist march.
- Brussels: About 10,000 protesters gathered in Brussels to protest in solidarity with the Black Lives Matter movement.
- Ghent: About 750 people protested in the Zuidpark.
- Hasselt: 200 people gathered at a Black Lives Matter demonstration.
- Kortrijk: About 15 people held a spontaneous demonstration.
- Ostend: About 300 people protested in an anti-racist march.
- Halle: About 200 people protested in an anti-racist march.

=== 8 June ===
- Leuven: Over 100 people marched through the city, even though the demonstration was explicitly not allowed.

=== 9 June ===
- Bruges: 200 people held a silent protest at 't Zand square.

=== 20 June ===
- Oudenaarde: A handful of young people held a solidarity protest for the victims of racist police brutality.

== Statues ==
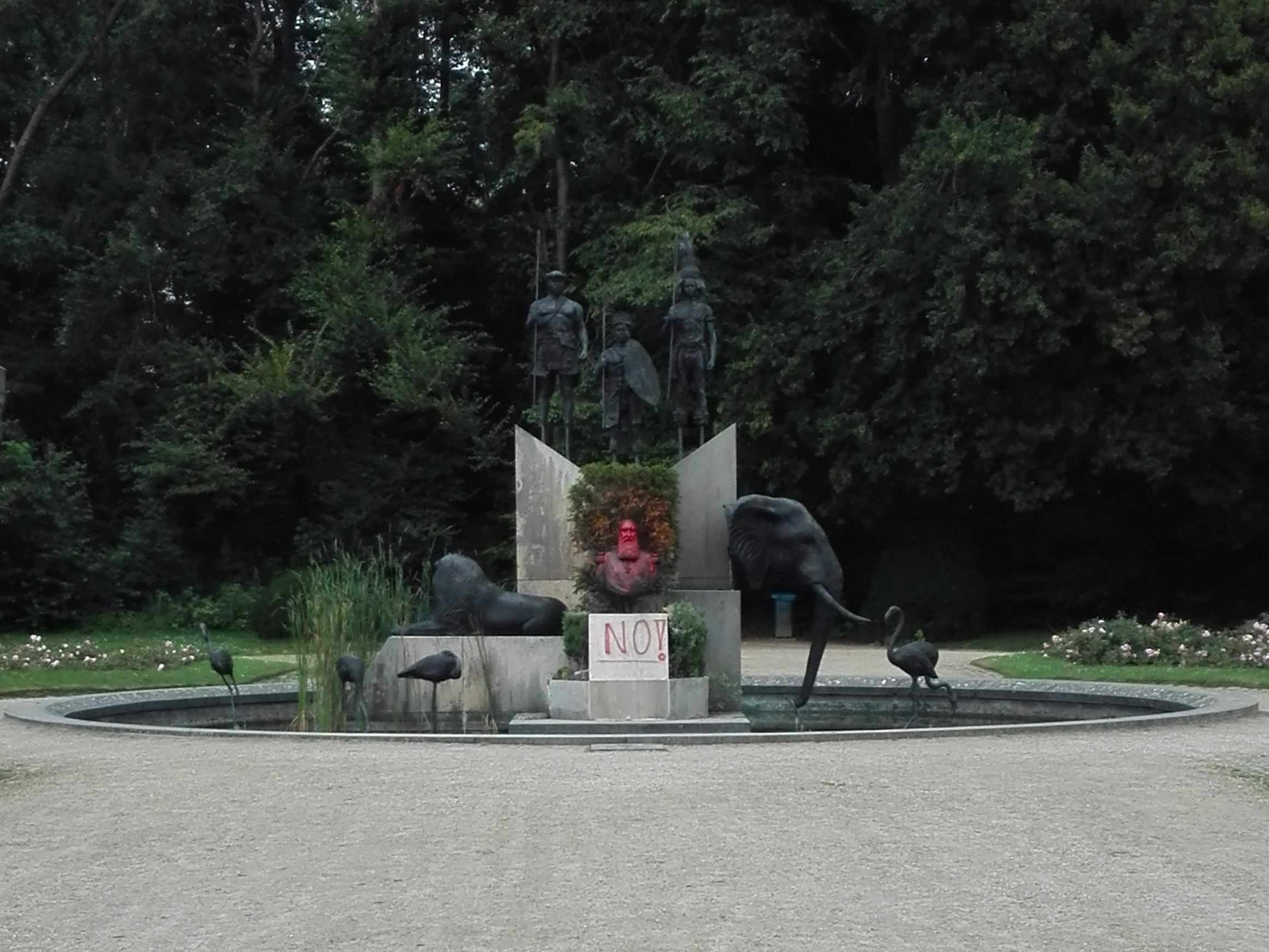
A Leopold II statue in Tervuren after being vandalised in July 2020.

Because King Leopold II was infamous for historic mass murder, disfigurement and other atrocities in the Congo, many statues of him were defaced or vandalised, including ones in Halle, Ostend, Ghent, Antwerp, and at the Royal Museum for Central Africa in Tervuren.

- The statue in Antwerp was eventually removed altogether by the city. Its removal was cited by Minister Ben Wyatt of Western Australia as a reason to rename the King Leopold Ranges.
- Authorities at the University of Mons took down a bust of Leopold II located in the Faculty of Economics and Management, and permanently placed it in storage, after a petition to remove the bust began circulating online.
- On June 11, a bust of Leopold II was removed from its pedestal in the Brussels municipality of Auderghem.
- Authorities at KU Leuven took down a bust of Leopold II located in the University Library and placed it in storage. (Note: Rector Luc Sels' statement on the issue leaves open the possibility of the bust eventually coming out of storage.)
- A bust of Leopold II was removed from Zuidpark on the 60th anniversary of Congo's independence, and moved to a warehouse in STAM.

== Reactions ==
Some Belgian politicians, including Prime Minister Sophie Wilmès and Minister-President of Flanders Jan Jambon, criticized the march for taking place during COVID-19 restrictions, which included a ban on demonstrations. Others condemned acts of violence and looting that occurred during some of the protests. After multiple officers received injuries following protests that turned violent, Belgian police unions voted to go on strike.

In response to the treatment of statues of King Leopold II had received during the protests, Prince Laurent of Belgium, younger brother of the current king, defended King Leopold II by saying that "Leopold II had never been to Congo. So I don't see how he would have made people suffer there". He added, "You should see what Leopold II has done for Belgium. He had parks built in Brussels and many other things".
