= Bernd Lohaus =

German-Belgian visual artist

Bernd Lohaus (12 october 1940 in Düsseldorf – 5 November 2010 in Antwerp) was a German sculptor, painter and draftsman.

== Life and works ==
Lohaus studied from 1963 to 1966 at the Düsseldorf Academy of Fine Arts under Professor Joseph Beuys. From 1964 to 1965, together with Panamarenko, Hugo Heyrman and Wout Vercammen, he edited the magazine New Happening.

During a trip to Spain he met Anny de Decker, an art history professor, whom he married in 1966. They later moved to Antwerp where they opened the avant-garde Wide White Space Galley in their home, displaying important exhibitions by Marcel Broodthaers in 1996 and Joseph Beuys in 1967. They also collaborated with the Danish artist Henning Christiansen, a member of the Fluxus current, with the famous Eurasienstab action. The gallery closed in 1976.

Bernd Lohaus works mainly involve wood, stone and paper. He often uses beams, rods, boards and nuts of Azobe wood, the hardest wood in West Africa. Lohaus's works gives importance to the relationship between the work and the surrounding environment. Language also plays an important role in the works. The artistic intervention is aimed at simplicity and reduced to sensitive actions. The works of Bernd Lohaus are born with the influence of the artistic movement of Fluxus, Arte Povera, Minimal Art and materialism, creating a new style in its own right.

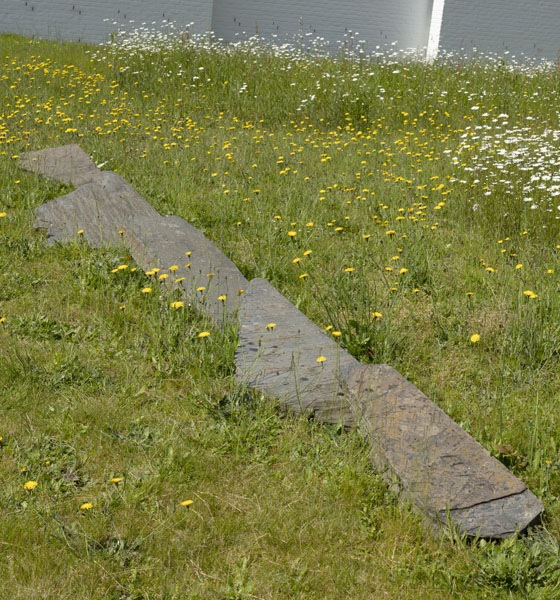
Wellen zur Hand gegebenes Echo (Museum Dhondt-Dhaenens)

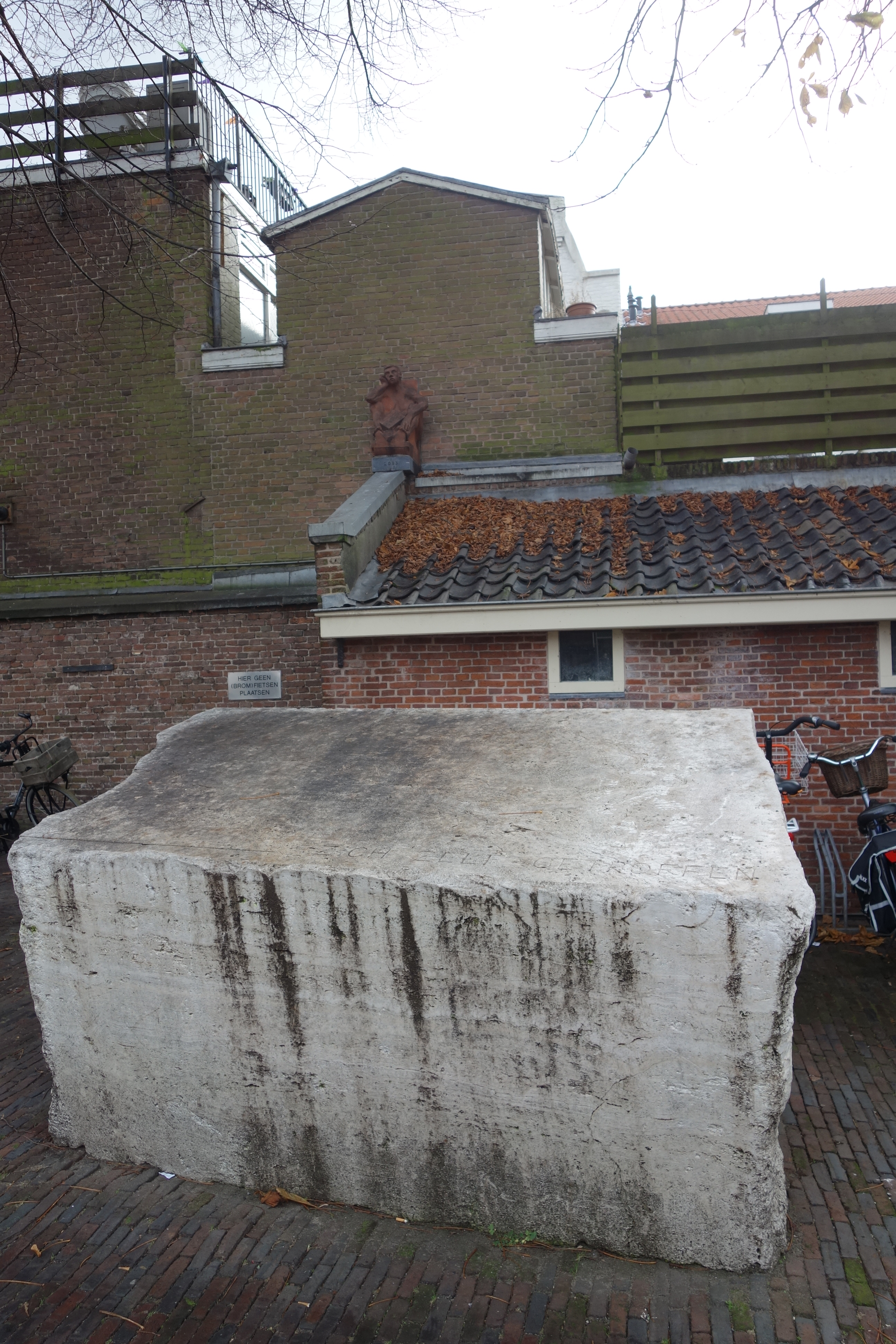
Zichzelf getroffen (Haarlem)

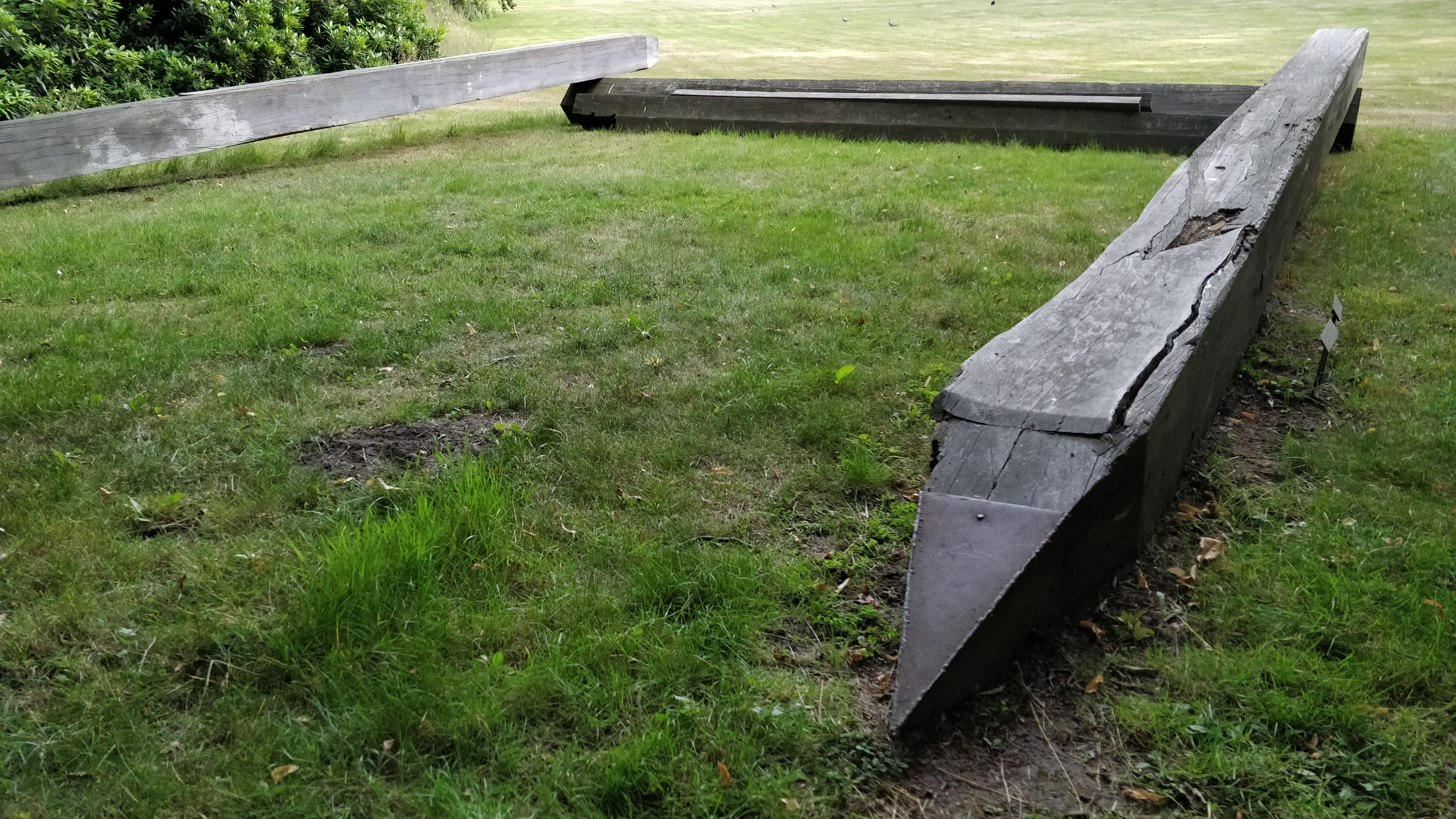
Zonder titel (Middelheimmuseum)

== Selected exhibitions ==
- 1975 Paris Biennale
- 1980 Kunstmuseum Düsseldorf
- 1990 Kunsthalle Bielefeld
- 1992 documenta IX
- 1995 MuHKA, Museum voor Hedendaagse Kunst (Anversa)
- 1997 Museu d'Art Contemporani de Barcelona
- 2000 Königliches Museum der Schönen Künste (Anversa)
- 2005 SMAK, Stedelijk Museum voor Actuele Kunst (Gent)

== Bibliography and catalogs ==
- Bernd Lohaus, R.H. Fuchs: Bernd Lohaus. Van Abbemuseum. Eindhoven 1979
- Bernd Lohaus: Wand. Kunstmuseum Düsseldorf 1980
- Bernd Lohaus 1973–1985. Katalog zur Ausstellung im Palais des Beaux-Arts des Bruxelles. Dewarichet. Brüssel 1985
- Joseph Beuys, Marcel Broodthaers, James Lee Byars, Henning Christiansen, Jorgen Dobloug, Imi Giese, Eva Hesse, Jörg Immendorff, Ute Klophaus, Bernd Lohaus, EL Loko, Inge Mahn, Robert Morris, Bjorn Norgaard, Nam June Paik, Blinky Palermo, Panamarenko: Brennpunkt Düsseldorf 1962–1087. Kunstmuseum Düsseldorf 1987
- G. Perlein, M. Buissart, Bernd Lohaus, H Depotte: Bernd Lohaus. Musée d'Art Moderne Villeneuve d'Ascq. 1988
- Piet Coessens, Dieter Ronte, Anny de Decker, Bernd Lohaus: Wide White Space. Hinter dem Museum 1966–1976. Richter-Verlag. Düsseldorf 1995
- Bernd Lohaus and Jan Foncé: Bernd Lohaus. Museum van Hedenaagse Kunst. Antwerpen 1996
- H. Martens, Bernd Lohaus, R. Balau: Bernd Lohaus 1998–2005. Stedelijk Museum voor Actuele Kunst. Gent 2005
