= Koning Albertpark, Antwerp =

Urban public park in Antwerp, Belgium

Koning Albertpark
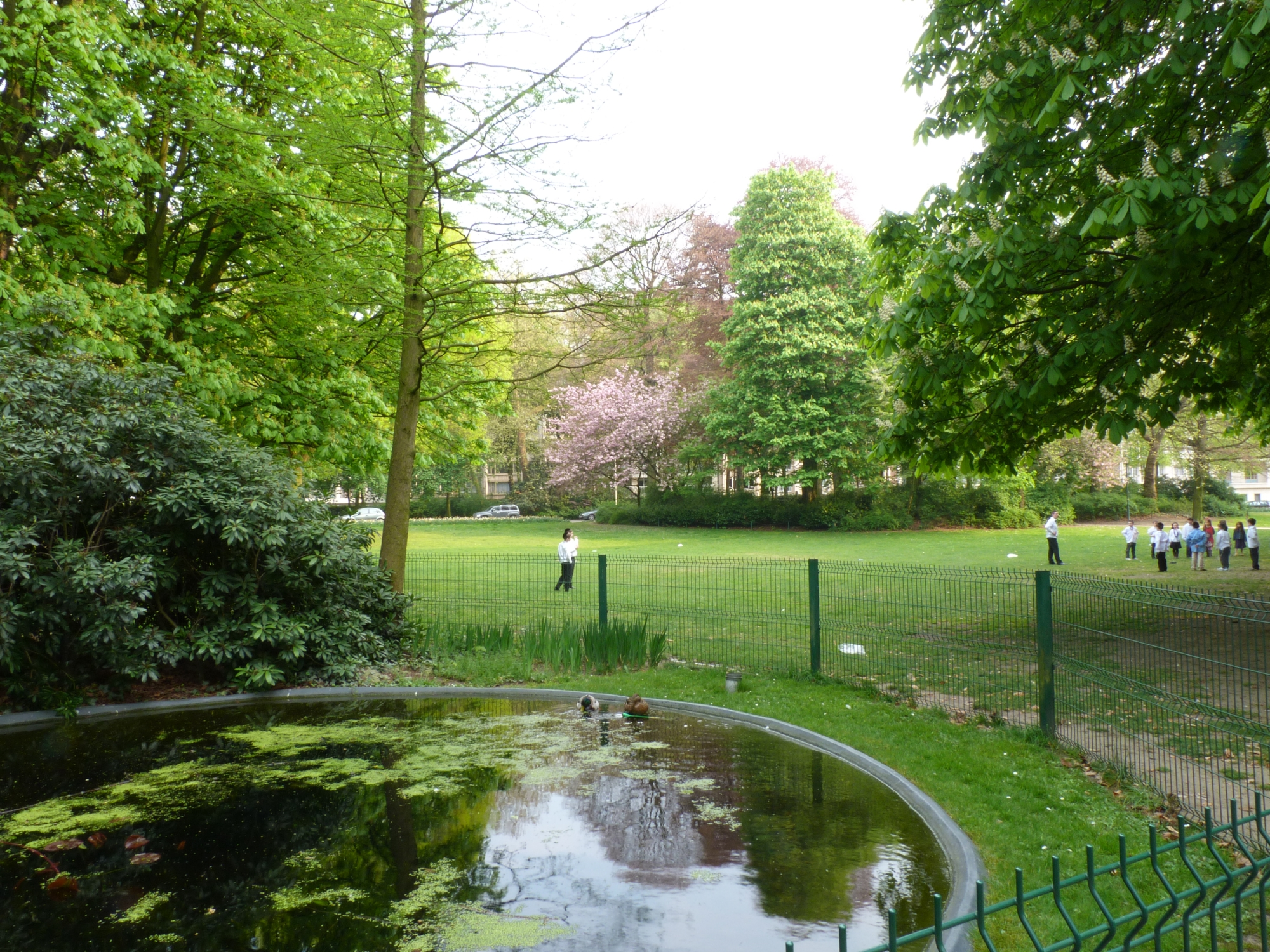
- View of Koning Albertpark with its pond and greenery
- Interactive map of Koning Albertpark
- Type: Urban public park
- Location: Antwerp, Belgium
- Coordinates: 51°11′59″N 4°24′46″E
- Area: approximately 6.2 ha
- Created: 1861

Koning Albertpark (King Albert Park) is an urban public park in Antwerp, Belgium. Established in 1861 for public use, it occupies approximately 6.2 hectares, and serves as a green space in the southern district of the city.

== History ==
=== Pre-19th century ===
The site of the modern Koning Albertpark had a markedly different function in earlier centuries.

In the 15th century, it was the location of a stone gallows, earning the name Galgenveld ("gallows field") due to its use as the execution site for criminals. By the late 17th century, the land was leased under conditions that prohibited nearby construction, signalling a gradual shift in its use and identity.

Even earlier, portions of the area may have been associated with rural or institutional functions. Nearby, in the 13th century, within what is now adjacent space such as the Parkje van de Harmonie, stood a leprosarium known as Ter Siecken (hospital for lepers). This later evolved into a noble estate called Valkenburg, highlighting the broader historical landscape in which the park would later emerge.

=== 19th century and later ===
With the dismantling of Antwerp’s fortifications in the mid-19th century and pressures for urban expansion and provision of public green spaces, the city designated the site as a public park in 1861.

This action formed part of a broader movement in Antwerp to convert former military zones into residential neighbourhoods and parks—a transformation that continued under late 19th-century urban planning initiatives.

== Features ==
The park features gently rolling lawns, mature trees, a central bandstand (kiosk), and paths for walking and jogging. A designated dog-walking zone is also provided.

== See also ==
- Harmoniepark
