= Wide White Space Gallery =

Coordinates: 51.2083°N 4.3966°E

The Wide White Space gallery was an art gallery in Antwerp, Belgium. It opened on the ground floor of the house known as "Het Bootje" in Antwerp's Plaatsnijdersstraat in Autumn 1966. Early exhibitions included works by Dr Hugo Heyrman (The Happy Spacemaker) and Panamarenko. In its first years the gallery hosted many of the leading lights of the European art scene. The gallery was an initiative of Anny De Decker and Bernd Lohaus. It closed in 1976. During its existence the gallery showed work by artists such as Carl Andre, Richard Artschwager, Marcel Broodthaers, Daniel Buren, Christo, Dan Flavin, Gotthard Graubner, Edward Kienholz, Bruce Nauman, Richard Long, Piero Manzoni, Gerhard Richter, Dieter Roth, Bernard Schultze, Niele Toroni, Günther Uecker, Victor Vasarely and Andy Warhol. Wide White Space worked particularly closely with Joseph Beuys, In 2012 Anny De Decker was honoured with the ART COLOGNE prize of €10,000 for her work with Wide White Space Gallery. For a more comprehensive overview see the corresponding German Wikipedia page. For more information about Anny De Decker see the Dutch Wikipedia page about Anny De Decker.
