= Cinderella's Ballroom =

Night club in Antwerp (mid-1970s to mid-1990s)

Cinderella's Ballroom was a night club at the Stadswaag in Antwerp, Belgium. Located in the Lange Brilstraat, it was started by Robert Tops and Maryse Ghoos in 1975. At first it was an underground club playing non-mainstream music. At the end of the 1970s it was probably the most important and influential night club in Belgium where for the first time punk rock and reggae music could be heard.

The club was open on Friday and Saturday night starting at midnight (explaining the name) and sometimes on Sunday night. It was located in a basement and the limited space made live performances awkward. The public came from a wide region: Belgium, The Netherlands, France and Germany, and included prominent members of punk rock bands. The club was frequently subjected to police razzia's and closed down in the middle of the 1990s.

Reunion parties have been taking place regularly in the 2000s and 2010s.
