= 't Fornuis =

- Interactive map of 't Fornuis

Restaurant information
- Established: 1977
- Head chef: Johan Segers
- Rating: Michelin Guide
- Location: Reynderstraat 24, Antwerp, Belgium

't Fornuis is a restaurant located in the Reynderstraat in Antwerp, Belgium. It is a quality restaurant that has been awarded one Michelin star from 1986 to present. Gault Millau gave them 17 out of 20 points.

The kitchen style is classic French and classic Belgian.

The head chef believes in working with fresh products. That means that there is no traditional menu, but a blackboard with that day's specials. These specials depend on the daily deliveries and the season.

Owner and head chef of 't Fornuis is Johan Segers.
