= King Albert Park, Ghent =

City park in the Belgian city of Ghent

Coordinates: 51°2′45″N 3°43′54″E

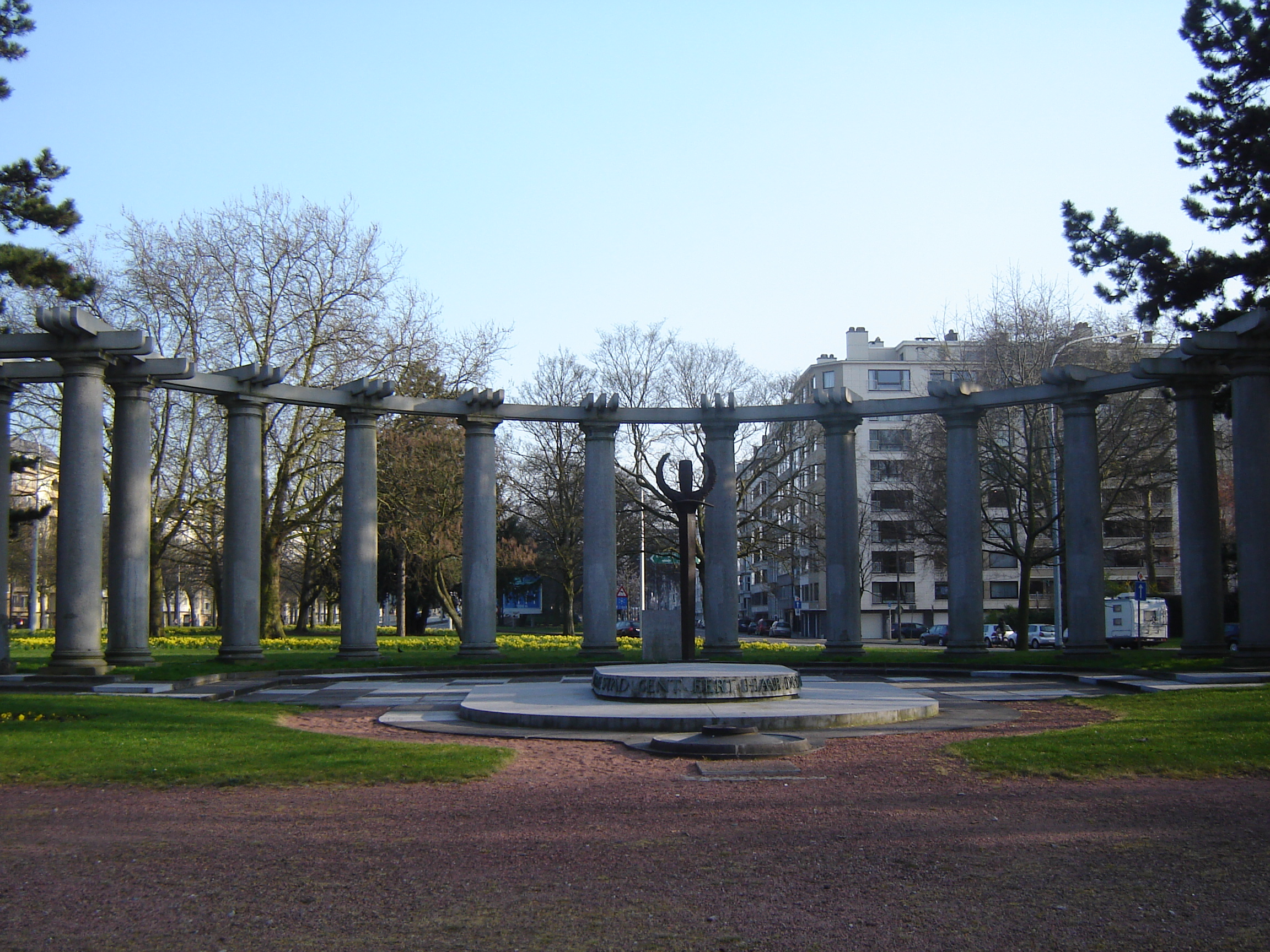
War memorial at the Achtmeiplein square at the Koning Albertpark in Ghent

The Koning Albertpark, also known as Zuidpark, is a city park in the Belgian city of Ghent. The park is located in the southeast of the city center, between Woodrow Wilson Square and the B401 motorway exits that terminate at Zuidpark in the city. It is a neo-baroque park, where the other parks in the city are mostly laid out in English landscape style.

After the demolition of the Gent-Zuid train station in 1928, which was replaced by the Gent-Sint-Pieters railway station, a large elongated space became available. In the 1930s, the Zuidpark was built on these former railway sites. After the death of King Albert I in 1934, it was officially called King Albert Park.

A bust of Leopold II of Belgium stood in the park for many years. It was removed in 2020, as a result of the George Floyd protests in Belgium.
