= Hollandse Synagoge =

Orthodox synagogue in Antwerp, Belgium

- English: Dutch Synagogue; Dutch: Hoofdsynagogue
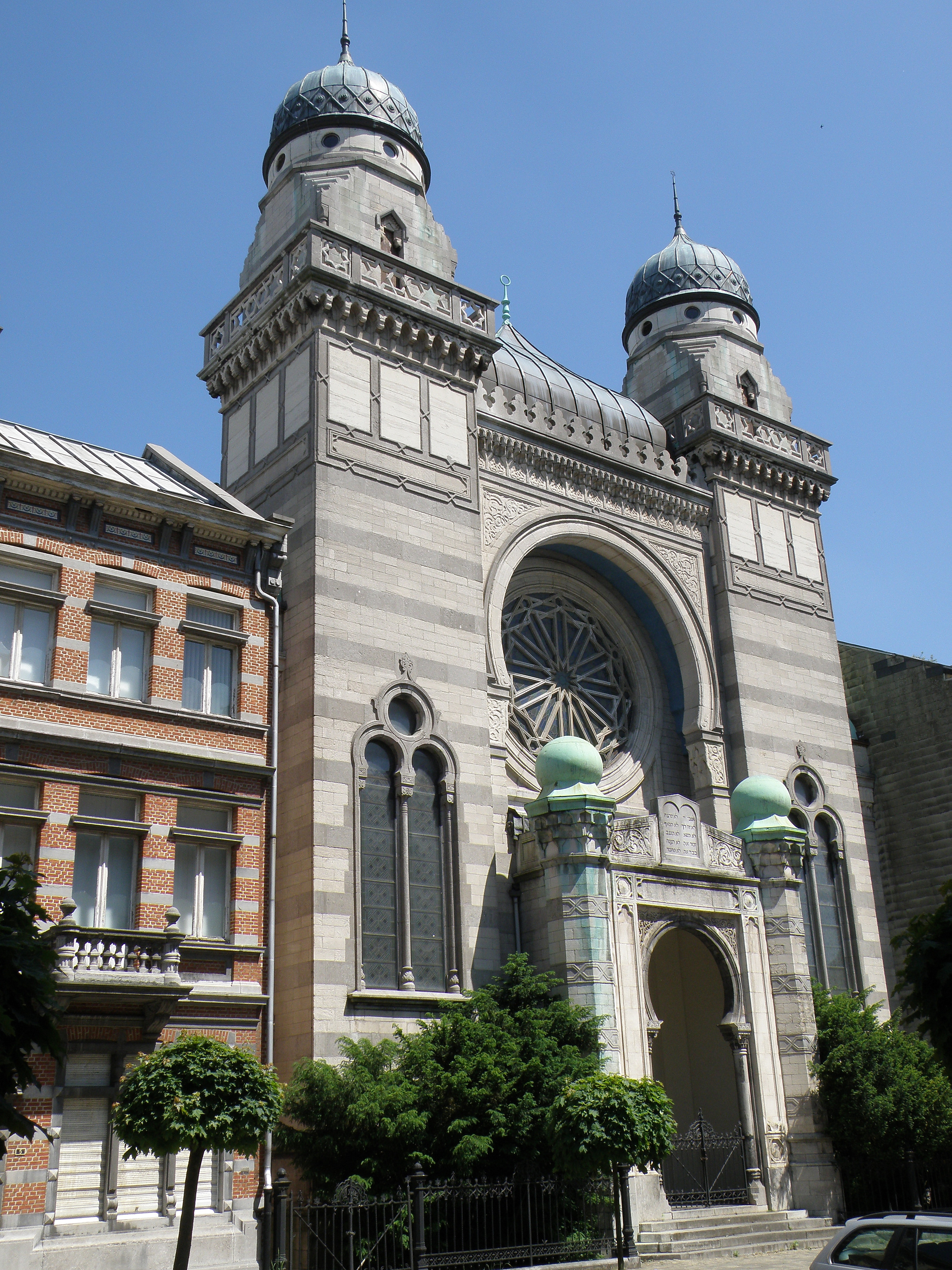
- The façade of the synagogue in 2010

- Location of the synagogue in Belgium

Religion
- Affiliation: Orthodox Judaism
- Rite: Nusach Sefard
- Ecclesiastical or organizational status: Synagogue
- Leadership: Rabbi Padwa (Chief Rabbi); Rabbi Schmahl (Dayan); Rabbi Chaim Parnas (Youth)
- Status: Active

Location
- Location: Bouwmeestersstraat 7, Antwerp
- Country: Belgium
- Interactive map of Hollandse Synagoge
- Coordinates: 51°12′28″N 4°23′49″E

Architecture
- Architect: Joseph Hertogs
- Type: Synagogue architecture
- Style: Moorish Revival
- Established: 1816 (as a congregation)
- Completed: 1893
- Dome: Two

Website
- shomre-hadas.be

The Hollandse Synagoge (English: Dutch Synagogue), officially the Synagogue Shomré Hadas, and also known as the Bouwmeester Synagoge, (Note: The building is also known in Antwerp as the Hoofdsynagogue or Main Synagogue.) is an Orthodox Jewish congregation and synagogue, located on Bouwmeestersstraat 7, in Antwerp, Belgium. Whilst the first Jews arrived in Antwerp in the 14th century, the congregation was not officially established until 1816. Descendants of Jews who came to Antwerp from the Netherlands in the early 19th century, built the synagogue in 1893 and it was the first large synagogue in Antwerp.

== History ==
Designed by Jewish architect Joseph Hertogs in the Moorish Revival style, the synagogue was inaugurated on Bouwmeestersstraat 7, in 1893.

Severely damaged by bombings during World War II, in 1944 the building was hit by a Nazi V1 flying bomb, and was entirely renovated in 1958. Although commissioned by an Orthodox Jewish community, the synagogue has a pipe organ built in the balcony, similar to the Dohány Street Synagogue in Budapest, Hungary.

The building was listed as a protected monument on 17 September 1976.

The synagogue is used on Rosh Hashana, Yom Kippur and for Shabbat morning services only.

== See also ==
- The Holocaust in Belgium
- History of the Jews in Antwerp
