= Hugo Heyrman =

Belgian painter, filmmaker and new media researcher (born 1942)

- Heyrman playing at the Florian, Venice, 1997
- Born: 20 December 1942 (age 83); Zwijndrecht, Belgium
- Known for: Painting, drawing, photography, film, digital media

Hugo Heyrman (born 20 December 1942), known by his artist name Dr. Hugo Heyrman, is a Belgian painter, filmmaker, internet pioneer, and synesthesia and new media researcher.

== Early life and education ==
Heyrman was born in Zwijndrecht, and lives and works in Antwerp. Originally, Heyrman opted for a musical education, but transferred to the visual arts. He graduated from the Royal Academy and became a laureate of the National Higher Institute for Fine Arts in Antwerp. In addition, he studied nuclear physics for one year at the State Higher Institute for Nuclear Energy in Mol. He received a PhD in art sciences, magna cum laude, from the Universidad de La Laguna, in Tenerife, with a thesis on Art & Computers: An Exploratory Investigation on the Digital Transformation of Art.

== Career ==
From his earliest work, Heyrman developed a specific vision on the nature of perception. "Most of my work has to do with contemporary fragility. The works are 'ways of seeing', forms of visual thinking, they make the virtual and mental space of an image real", he declares on his website. His art practice includes painting, drawing, sculpture, photography, video, film and digital media. On his website 'Museums of the Mind' he continues to publish his research, theory and experiments on the telematic future of art, the senses and synaesthesia.

During the sixties, Heyrman profiled himself as an avant-garde artist with happenings, film and video experiments. Online since 1995, Heyrman became one of the pioneers in Net.art. He also participated in 1988 at the First International Symposium on Electronic Art (FISEA) in Utrecht.

In 1995, Heyrman coined the terms "tele-synaesthesia" and "post-ego". Since 1993 he has been a working member of the Royal Flemish Academy of Belgium for Science and the Arts, Brussels. As of 2006 he was a professor at the Royal Academy for Fine Arts, Antwerp.

=== Projects ===
- Continental Video & Film Tour with his 'Mobile Museum of Modern Media' through Belgium, Germany, France and the Netherlands (1970–73).
- 'Street-life' paintings. Elected laureate of the 'Jeune Peinture Belge' at the Palais des Beaux-Arts, Brussels (1974).
- Monumental painting series on 'Water', 'Light', 'Time', 'A Vision is Finer than a View' and 'New Models of Reality', which Heyrman describes as painting the existential tension between ideas and images; an appeal to several senses at once.
- Fuzzy Dreamz series, a work in progress since 1996, which Heyrman describes as the transformation of his painting experiences into digital media and vice versa.
- Various Internet art projects, including the online exhibitions Digital Studies: Being In Cyberspace 'ALT-X-site' (1997), New York, and 'Revelation', ISEA 2000, Paris.
- His works have been presented in international exhibitions in Antwerp, Brussels, Basel, Amsterdam, Paris, Barcelona and Chicago, and at the Venice Biennale.

== See also ==
- Cyberarts
- Interactive art
- New media art
