= History of the Jews in Antwerp =

Jewish history in Antwerp, Belgium

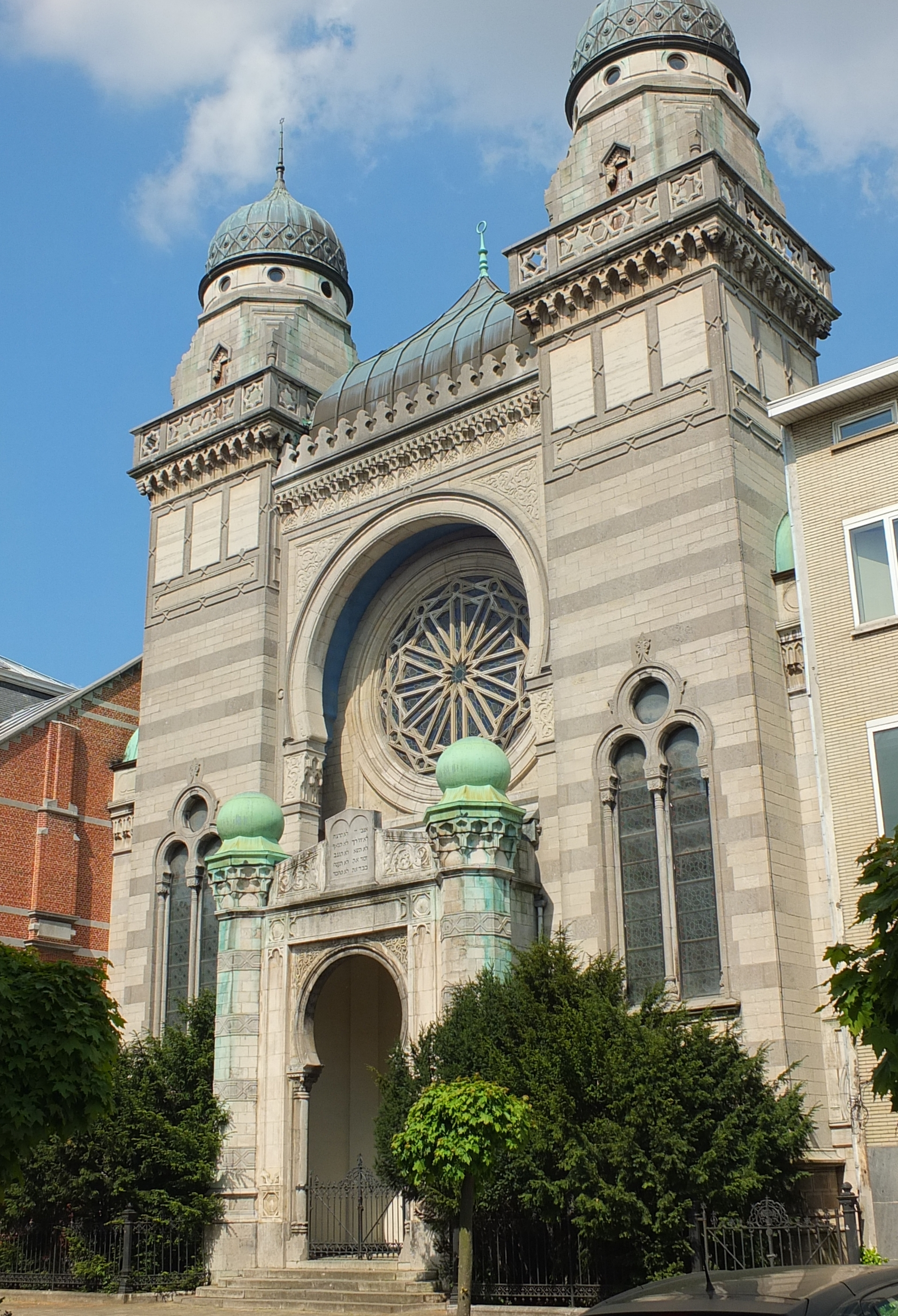
Hollandse Synagogue in Antwerp

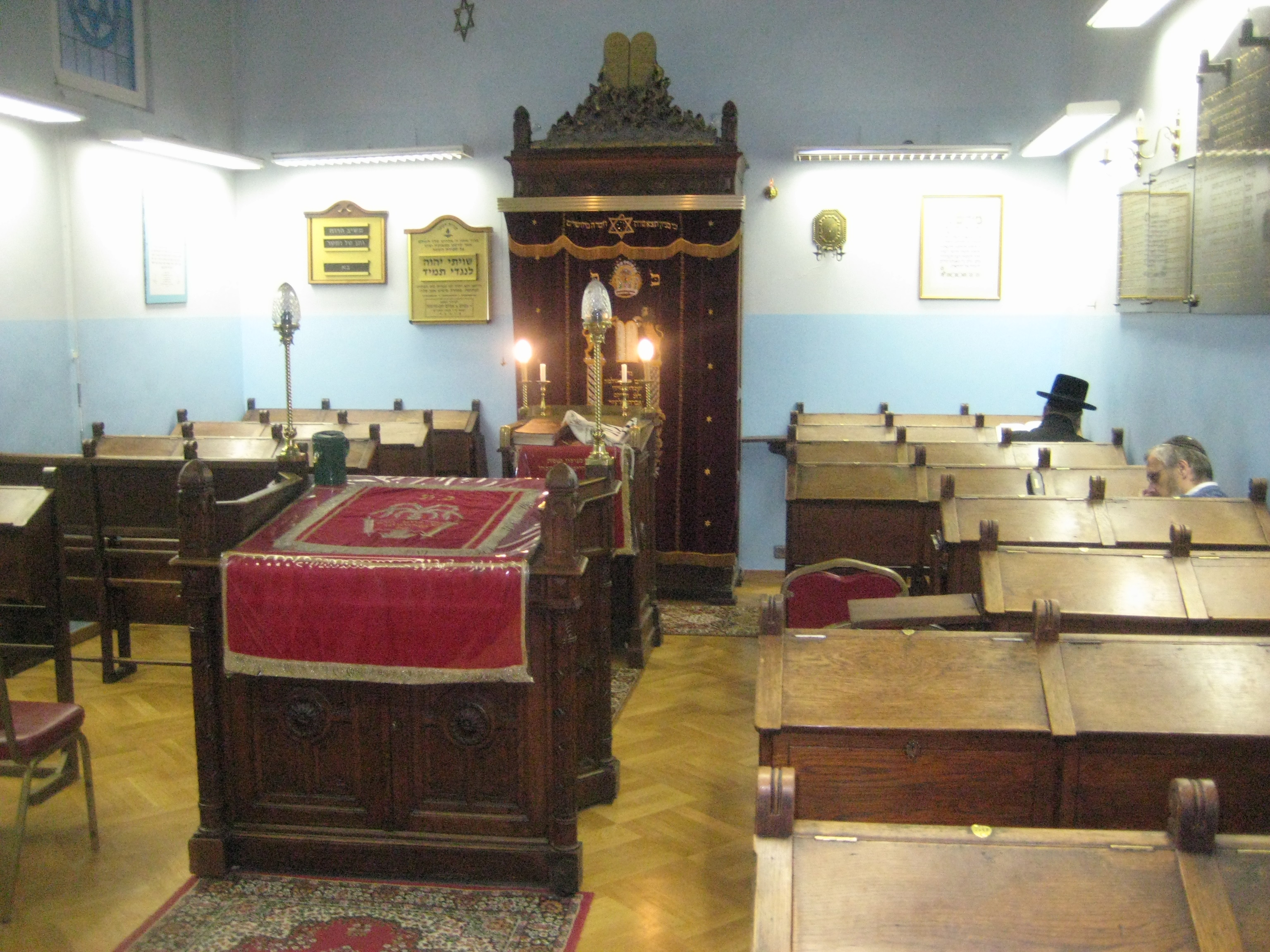
Interior of Eisenman Synagogue

The history of the Jews in Antwerp, a major city in the modern country of Belgium, goes back at least eight hundred years. Jewish life was first recorded in the city in the High Middle Ages. While the Jewish population grew and waned over the centuries, by the beginning of World War II Antwerp had a thriving Jewish community comprising some 35,000, with many Jews connected to the city's diamond industry. The Nazi occupation of Antwerp from 1940 and The Holocaust decimated the city’s Jewish population. By the time of Antwerp's liberation in September 1944, the Jewish population had fallen to around 1,200.

Since then, Antwerp’s Jewish community has rebounded to become a major European centre of Haredi (and particularly Hasidic) Orthodox Judaism. Antwerp is now one of only two cities in Europe (together with London) that is home to a considerable Haredi population in the 21st century. In 2018, there were around 20,000 Haredi Jews living in Antwerp (of which around 10,000 are Hasidic).

== History ==
=== Early history ===
The first official document that refers to the Jewish community in Antwerp itself is the will of Henry III, Duke of Brabant, who in 1261 expressed his wish that the Jews of Brabant should be expelled on account of their perceived status as usurers. While the community was not ultimately expelled, taxes were increased on them. In the following century, in 1348, the Jews of Antwerp and other major cities in the region were accused of poisoning the wells and were harshly punished for this, many of them being ‘hanged, burned at the stake, beaten to death or drowned.’

It may be that many of the Jews who helped establish Antwerp as a commercial hub in the Low Countries were refugees from England and France.

A new group of Jewish immigrants started to settle in Antwerp in the early 16th century, when the city became a relatively safe haven for crypto-Jews fleeing the persecutions and the expulsions in the Iberian Peninsula. An often tenuous presence was maintained for the next century and a half, although Jews were not allowed to acquire citizenship and persecution was common under Spanish rule and many Jews were expelled. Some returned after the Peace of Westphalia.

=== 19th century ===
It was not until 1794 and with the arrival of the French Revolution that Jews could settle freely in Antwerp again. Pursuant to Napoleon's Imperial Decree of 20 July 1808, Jews throughout areas under French rule, which included Antwerp, were forced to acquire fixed first names and family names (which were forbidden to be from the Hebrew Bible).

The current Jewish community of Antwerp was officially established in 1816, when there were about one hundred Jews living in the city. This, the first legally-recognized community, was known as the Jewish Community (in French, Communauté israélite). The first Jewish public prayers were held in the private home of Moise Kreyn, having received the approval of the city authorities. The Jews of Antwerp acquired possession of a cemetery in 1828. There were 151 Jews living in Antwerp in 1829.

=== The Holocaust ===
In December 1940, there were around 35,000 Jews in the city, many connected to the diamond industry, and there was a lively Jewish culture, with various organizations, sports clubs, and cultural groups, including Zionist groups. When Belgium was liberated in 1944, there were only 800 Jews left. During the Second World War, 65% of the city's Jews perished in the Holocaust (vs. 35% of Jews from Brussels). On April 14, 1941, the so-called "Antwerp pogrom" occurred when some 200 followers of the Vlaams Nationaal Verbond ("Flemish National Union"), Volksverwering ("People's Defense"), Anti-Jewish League and other pro-Nazi anti-Semitic groups burned two synagogues in the Oostenstraat, smashed the windows of Jewish-owned shops, damaged religious symbols and harassed the Jewish population. From May to September 1942, some 1500 Jewish men from Antwerp were taken into forced labor in Northern France, building the "Atlantic Wall" for the Organisation Todt. On three occasions between the end of July and November 1942, Jews in Antwerp were rounded up by the Germans with the collaboration of the local police. From a community of around 35,000 Jews in Antwerp before the war, some 15,000 remained in the city after 1945.

== Jewish community in the 21st century ==
The Jewish community of Antwerp consists of around 20,000-25,000 members. The majority of residents identifying themselves as Jewish belong to traditional or Orthodox communities, although levels of religious practice vary. The Haredi, or ultra-orthodox Jews, traditionally tend to live concentrated in the city center in an area south of the Antwerp Central railway station. This neighborhood is also sometimes known as "Jewish Antwerp" (Dutch: Joods Antwerpen). Its main attraction is its close proximity to the diamond bourse, where in earlier days a large part of the community worked. It is also where the Jewish schools, kosher food outlets, and general Jewish amenities are located.

In recent years many of the younger generation of secular Jews have moved away from the crowded city center. There has also been small but steady growth of Orthodox satellite communities in suburbs such as Edegem due to the work put in by Chabad Shliach, Rabbi Menachem Mendel Hertz, Wilrijk and Brasschaat. This may cause the Antwerp community to seem overwhelmingly Haredi to the casual observer. After New York City, London and Paris, Antwerp is one of the largest communities of Haredi Jews outside Israel.

Within the prominently Ashkenazi religious community, there are two religious councils, known as kehillas, and a small Sephardi council:

- The Israëlitische Gemeente van Antwerpen Shomre Hadass; primarily oriented toward the Modern Orthodox community. It is led by Chief Rabbi David Moshe Lieberman. This council also espouses the values of religious Zionism and maintains a pro-Israel stance in community affairs.
- The Orthodox Israëlitische Gemeente Machsike Hadass primarily oriented toward the ultra-orthodox Haredi community.
- The "Portugees Israëlitische Gemeenschap van Antwerpen" is the Sephardi religious community.

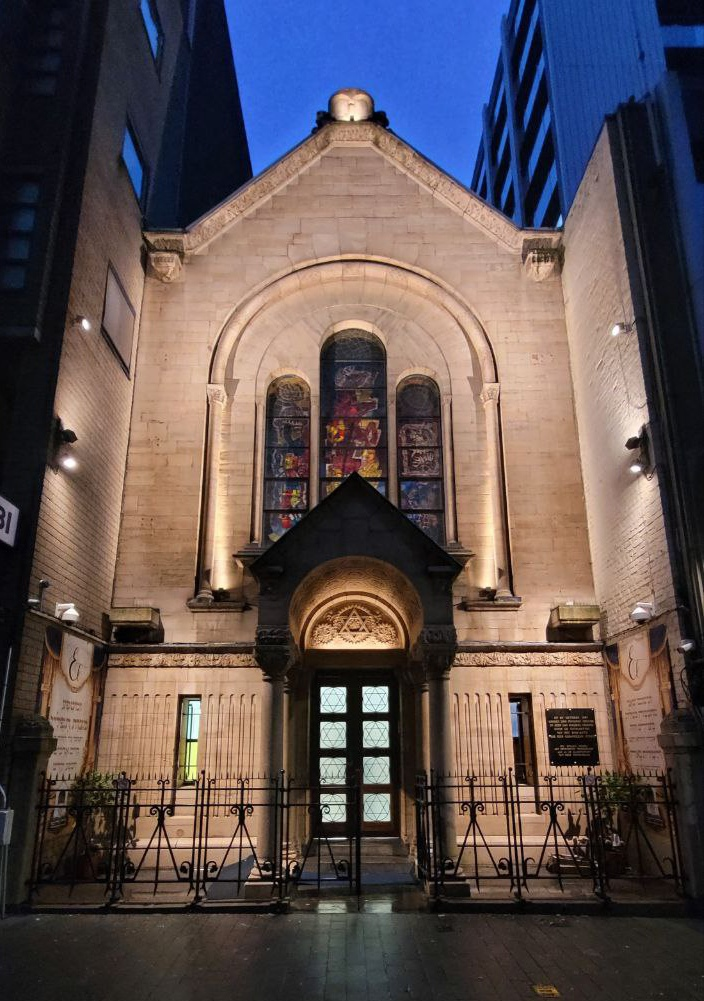
Sephardi Synagogue of Antwerp

Rabbi Chaim Kreiswirth, was the Chief Rabbi of the Machzikei Hadass kehilla for many years and was widely regarded as a pre-eminent scholar of Talmud. He died in 2001 and was replaced by Rabbi Rubinstein of Israel, who died a few months after being nominated to the post. Since December 2010, the position has been filled by Rabbi Aaron Schiff. Rabbi Schiff, a follower of the current Grand Rabbi of the Belz dynasty, Rabbi Yissachar Dov Rokeach, is an alumnus of the Erlau yeshiva in Jerusalem and was previously the Rabbi of the local Alexander synagogue.

An essential difference between these two organizations is apparent in the Shomrei Hadas' alignment with religious Zionist doctrine, which the Machzikei Hadass rejects.

=== Hasidic Jews ===
Hasidic Jews comprise about forty percent of the Jews of Antwerp. Hasidic movements represented in Antwerp include:

- Alexander (located in the Isabellalei)
- Belz (the big one on Van Spangenstr-Media plein, and the new shtiebel at Lange Leemstr.)
- Bobov
- Belz-Machnovka (located in the Van Leriusstraat)
- Chortkov (located in the Van Leriusstraat)
- Ger
- Lubavitch is located on the Brialmontlei. A splinter group of Messianic Lubavitchers meets in the Oostenstraat.
- Pshevorsk (located in the Mercatorstraat)
- Satmar
- Shotz
- Skver
- Sanz-Klausenberg (located in the Isabellalei)
- Vizhnitz (Vizhnitz Bnei Brak, Vizhnitz New York)

The Pshevorsk movement is the only internationally recognized Hasidic movement whose rebbe is based in Antwerp. The Pshevorsker Rebbe, Rabbi Leibish Leiser, lives in Antwerp, as did his predecessors. Pshevorsker Hasidim live mainly in Antwerp, London, and Manchester; on Jewish holidays, many come to Antwerp to see their rebbe.

There are also other Hasidic rebbes in Antwerp, including a Spinka Rebbe and a Zhemigrader Rebbe. These groups have rebbes in other locations as well.

=== Non-Hasidic Jews ===
Although the Jews not aligned to any Hasidic group probably no longer greatly outnumber the Hasidim, they have a substantial presence. The three major synagogues in Antwerp, known locally by their addresses, The Van Den Nestlei and the Bouwmeesterstraat (pictured above) shuls of the Shomre Hadass and the Oostenstraat shul, are not aligned to any Hasidic movement.

There is a small Lithuanian Jewish community. Furthermore, there are organizations of Georgian Jews, a Sephardic synagogue, and secular Jewish organizations.

=== Eruv ===
As in other cities with large Jewish communities, Antwerp is surrounded by a wire called "eruv" (Eiroew in Dutch). In contrast to the eruvs in New York City or other large cities, the Antwerp eruv surrounds the whole city center. The presence of this eruv allows Jews to interpret the city as one big house, making it easier to avoid breaking some Sabbath regulations within it. The wire constituting the eruv can be found close to the Singel at a height of 6 meters, and at the entrance of the Diamond district.

=== Schools ===
A number of Jewish schools are found throughout the Jewish district (95% of the Jewish children of Antwerp receive a religious education). The three main Jewish schools in Antwerp are the Yesode Hatora of the Machsike Hadas, and the Yavne and Tachkemoni schools of the Shomre Hadas.

The Yesode Hatora - Beth Jacob population is composed primarily of students from Hasidic, Haredi, and Orthodox backgrounds. It provides instruction in religious as well as secular studies: Students follow a dual curriculum starting in pre-school/kindergarten, through primary school and secondary school. Established in 1903, it is the oldest of Antwerp's Jewish schools, and has the highest population of Jewish students. Students are educated in accordance with the values of Haredi Judaism, and fulfill the educational requirements of the Flemish Ministry of Education. The student population is separated by gender; male students attend Yesode Hatora, and female students attend Beth Jacob. In accordance with the religious ideology that puts little value on secular learning, the school actively discourages the pursuit of secular higher education.

The Yavne school is aligned with the religious Zionist movement. Similar to Yesode Hatora/Beth Jacob, the Yavne school follows a dual curriculum composed of religious and secular studies. Students are educated in accordance with the values of religious Zionism, and fulfill the educational requirements of the Belgian Ministry of Education. The school is not mixed, they do meet up in the playgrounds; male students attend the Yeshiva Tichonit and females the Ulpena Lebanot. An estimated 98% of Yavne students typically emigrate to Israel (commonly referred to in Jewish communities as "making aliyah") within one year of graduation from secondary school. In recent years, far-reaching improvements have been achieved in the secular curriculum. Religious instruction also adheres to high standards and a widely developed curriculum.

The Tachkemoni is a fully co-educational school, attracting students from primarily secular Jewish backgrounds and some modern-Orthodox families. Its high level of Hebrew and serious preparation for the Jerusalem Examination (Bechina Yerushalmit) administered by the Jewish Agency and the Hebrew University of Jerusalem makes it one of the finest Jewish educational institutions in Europe. Most graduates pursue university studies after completing secondary school, and many spend a year in Israel. Tachkemoni was founded in 1920 by Rabbi Moshe Avigdor Amiel, a moderate religious Zionist. His vision of a strong Jewish education, along with a good secular education, is still part of the culture of Tachkemoni.

In addition, there are several kollelim, where married men can continue their studies. The famed Haredi Etz Chaim Yeshiva, where hundreds of young men from around the world study, is now located in the Wilrijk district, having previously been in the Antwerp suburban towns, first of Heide, then Kapellen.

Many synagogues, schools, charities, and social groups care for the environment. A majority of Jews living in Antwerp are multi-lingual and communicate in a variety of languages. Yiddish, French, Hebrew, English, and German are all widely spoken among members of the community, as well as Dutch. The Jewish community of Antwerp did not immediately adopt the locally spoken Dutch language as their common spoken language. Instead, in line with the people they worked with in the diamond trade, they spoke French, the language of commerce in Antwerp until after World War II. In recent years, English has taken over as the common language of choice, while stricter enforcement of local language regulations ensure that all children are fluent in Dutch. The use of language in Antwerp's Jewish community is a complex issue: While community members possess fair knowledge of different languages, there is a lack of uniformity when it comes to effective communication and discussion in a common language.

=== Demographics ===
The Jewish community in Antwerp has maintained a strong and active presence in the local diamond trade. After World War II, Belgian Jewish survivors as well as others from Eastern Europe settled in Antwerp and built up an influential and highly successful stake in the diamond business. Whether through established diamond trading offices, cutting and polishing factories, or as diamond brokers, Antwerp's Jews established themselves as capable businessmen and -women.

Over the course of the past decade, however, much of the wholesale diamond trade has been taken over by the Jain Indian community. With easy access to manufacturing centers in India, where production costs are significantly cheaper, the Jewish community has lost some of its influence as far as the diamond trade is concerned. However, the diamond business remains a common profession shared by most of the members of the Jewish community.

=== Community publications ===
- Joods Actueel is a family-owned and operated monthly magazine led by General Director Terry Davids and Managing Editor Michael Zevi Freilich.
- Kehilatenu, published weekly by the Shomre Hadass, in Dutch, contains sections on the portion of the week, including community news.
- Shabbat b'Shabbato, published weekly by the Machzikei Hadass, in Hebrew and Yiddish. It is commonly perused by synagogue attendants at Sabbath services.
- Lema'an Teida, a Yiddish weekly e-newsletter written by Pinchas Kornfeld, consists primarily of editorial content.

== See also ==
- Pshevorsk (Hasidic Jewish movement based in Antwerp)
- History of the Jews in Belgium
- The Holocaust in Belgium
- Antisemitism in contemporary Belgium
- Eisenman Synagogue, Antwerp
