= Harmoniezaal Antwerp =

Harmoniezaal (De Harmonie)
- Zaal Harmonie

General information
- Status: Restored, in use as district house
- Architectural style: Neoclassical
- Location: Harmoniepark, 2018 Antwerp, Belgium
- Coordinates: 51.202237°N 4.411275°E
- Current tenants: District council offices, citizen services, event venue
- Completed: 7 June 1846
- Renovated: 1889; 2017–2021
- Owner: City of Antwerp (since 1922–1923)

Design and construction
- Architects: Pieter Dens; expansion by Charles Dens; renovation by Atelier Kempe Thill

Harmoniezaal (Dutch for "Harmony Hall"), also known as Zaal Harmonie or De Harmonie, is a historic neoclassical building in Antwerp, Belgium, originally built in 1846 as a summer concert and ball hall for the musical society Société Royale d'Harmonie.

== History ==
Construction began with the laying of the foundation stone on 16 July 1845; the hall was officially inaugurated on 7 June 1846, designed by the young architect Pieter Dens. In 1889, his nephew Charles Dens undertook a significant expansion, doubling the hall's size, adding a vaulted ceiling, and relocating the stage.

In 1922–1923, the City of Antwerp acquired the building. Its function shifted to that of a public festival and reception hall, marking the transformation from private society to civic space. Over the 20th century, the venue declined—used briefly as a nightclub (1977–1979), with many of its architectural features obscured or removed.

== Restoration and Adaptive Reuse ==
In response to an open call by the Flemish Government Architect in 2010, Atelier Kempe Thill, with partners RE-ST and LAND, won the commission to restore and repurpose the building as a modern district center—integrating public services, event spaces, and council offices.

The restoration (2017–2021) reinstated neoclassical elements like stucco, façades, and the orangery, while adapting interiors to modern standards of climate control, acoustics, and energy efficiency. It reopened in 2021 as the "district house of Antwerp", offering citizen services and multifunctional cultural spaces.

== Architectural and Cultural Significance ==
The venue exemplifies 19th-century bourgeois neoclassical architecture—a summer pavilion with strong ties between indoors and outdoors, evidenced by its park setting and orangery.

The adjacent Harmoniepark was laid out as an English landscape garden and restored together with the hall. It includes winding paths, open lawns, and the Peter Benoit fountain, relocated there in 1951.
