= List of parks in Antwerp =

This is a list parks in the province of Antwerp.

== Antwerp ==
Name	Location	Size (ha, a)
Albertpark/Harmonie	Antwerp	6, 16
Bisschoppenhof	Deurne	2, 93
Boekenbergpark	Deurne	10
Bos AWW	Berendrecht	37, 5
Brilschanspark	Berchem	9, 77
Leeuwerikpark	Berchem	3, 13
Nachtegalenpark	Berchem, Wilrijk	90
Plantentuin	Antwerp	N/A
Rivierenhof	Deurne	130
Schoonselhof	Hoboken, Wilrijk	84
Sorghvliedt	Hoboken	16, 14
Spoor Noord	Antwerp	17
Stadspark	Antwerp	11, 14
Te Boelaerpark	Antwerp	15, 95
