= Coudenberg =

Street in Brussels, Belgium

Coudenberg (French); Koudenberg (Dutch)
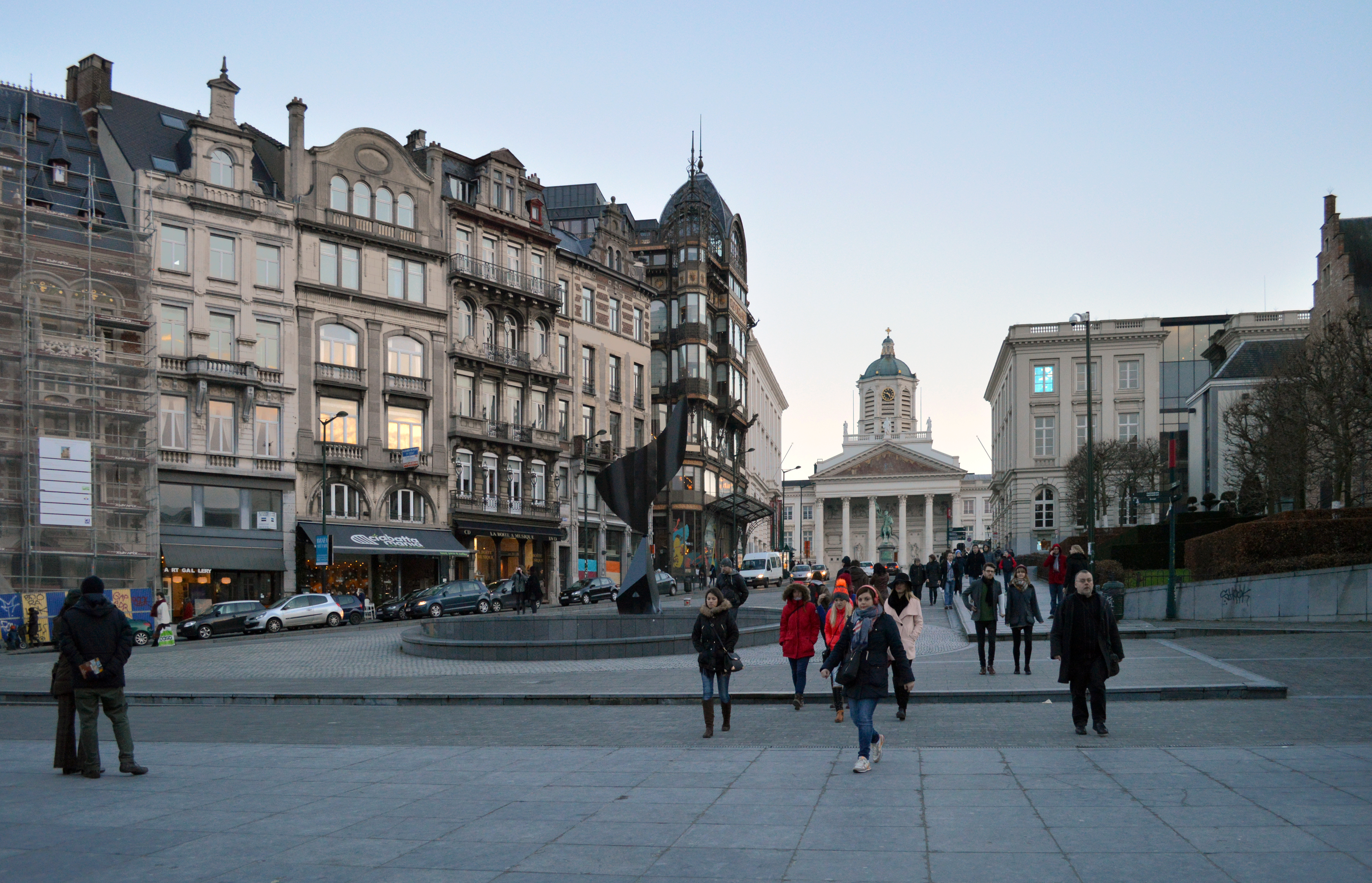
- View on the Coudenberg/Koudenberg from the Mont des Arts/Kunstberg

- Location within Brussels Location within Belgium
- Namesake: Coudenberg hill
- Type: Street
- Location: City of Brussels, Brussels-Capital Region, Belgium
- Quarter: Royal Quarter
- Postal code: 1000
- Coordinates: 50°50′35″N 4°21′30″E

The Coudenberg (French) or Koudenberg (Dutch) is a street in central Brussels, Belgium. It runs from the Rue Ravenstein/Ravensteinstraat to the Rue Villa Hermosa/Villa Hermosastraat and forms the only surviving part of a once longer artery. It takes its name from the historic Coudenberg hill, associated with the former ducal palace.

== Toponymy ==
The toponym Coudenberg means "cold hill" (Latin: montus frigidus). It originally referred to the hill itself and more specifically to the medieval Steenweg continuing from the Rue du Marché aux Herbes/Grasmarkt and the Rue de la Madeleine/Magdalenastraat, which passed through the Coudenberg Gate of the first city walls near the abbey of the same name. In the 19th century, this stretch was renamed the Rue de Namur/Naamsestraat, replacing the older designation.

== History ==
=== Inception and construction ===
By royal decree of 1895, a new street was planned to connect the Rue Montagne de la Cour/Hofbergstraat to the Cantersteen/Kantersteen by a curved layout. From an urban planning perspective, this new artery corresponded to the Rue Courbe as conceived by Henri Maquet in 1876 and refined in Alphonse Balat's 1882 design. The project was part of the redevelopment of the Rue Montagne de la Cour, which included expanding the Royal Museums of Fine Arts (then the Palace for Art, Science and Literature) and clearing the densely populated Saint-Roch/Sint-Rochus Quarter (French: Quartier Saint-Roch, Dutch: Sint-Rochuswijk). Maquet further developed the scheme between 1884 and 1898.

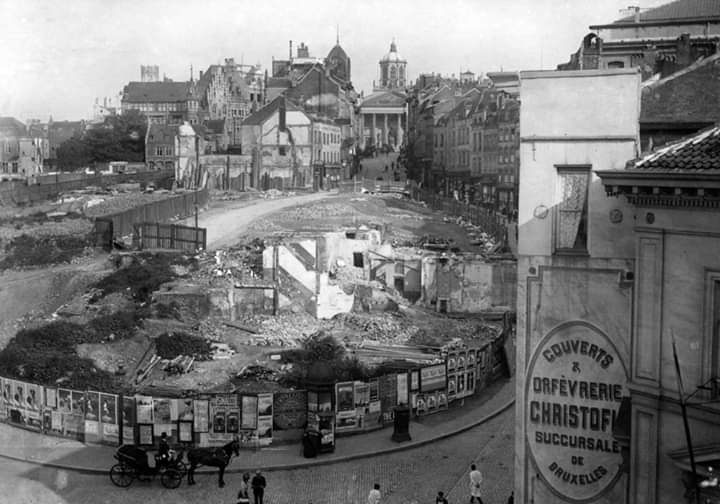
Destruction of the Saint-Roch/Sint-Rochus Quarter in 1897–98

The Rue Courbe was laid out between 1879 and 1899, during which the Saint Roch Quarter was demolished. From 1897 to 1902, a series of shop houses was built along the north side, mainly in neo-Gothic and neo-Renaissance styles, with designs by Paul Saintenoy, G. Vanden Bemden, E. Collès, and L. Laureys. Two Art Nouveau houses by Saintenoy, built in 1899 and 1901, included one of the earliest uses of reinforced concrete (Hennebique system) in Brussels. Early establishments also included the Continental Bodega Company and its tavern.

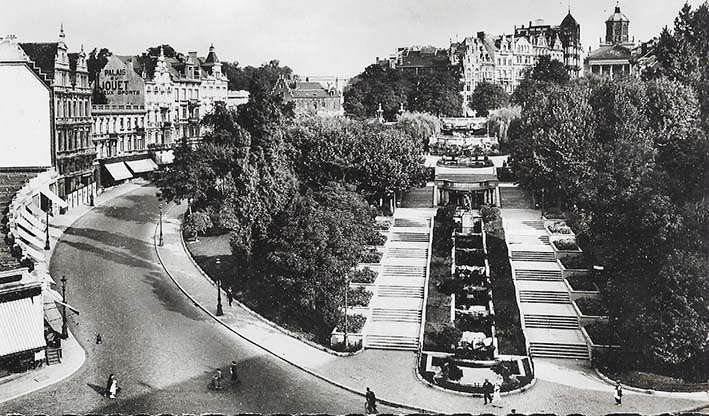
The Rue Courbe in the 1920s, showing Vacherot's temporary garden and steps

To increase the area's appeal ahead of the Brussels International Exposition of 1910, a temporary garden with staircases, cascading fountains, and sculptures was laid out on the Mont des Arts/Kunstberg site by the French architect Jules Vacherot. At the same time, the street was widened, the Rue Ravenstein/Ravensteinstraat was begun, and additional commercial houses were built by Saintenoy in 1909.

=== Contemporary (1950–present) ===
Until the early 1950s, the street still linked the Cantersteen and Rue de l'Empereur/Keizersstraat to the Rue Montagne de la Cour, skirting the provisional Mont des Arts garden. Around 1955, however, the western section and Vacherot's garden was demolished to make way for the Mont des Arts complex, designed by the architects Jules Ghobert and Maurice Houyoux from a 1937 project and executed between 1954 and 1969. Since then, the street has been bordered on that side by the rear of the Congress Palace (now housing Square – Brussels Convention Centre) and other Mont des Arts buildings.

The Whirling Ear, a sculpture by the American artist Alexander Calder, was created for the 1958 Brussels World's Fair (Expo 58) and originally placed in a pond before the American Pavilion. After the exhibition, it was donated to Belgium, fell into disrepair, and was restored before being installed at the top of the Mont des Arts stairs on 21 June 2000.

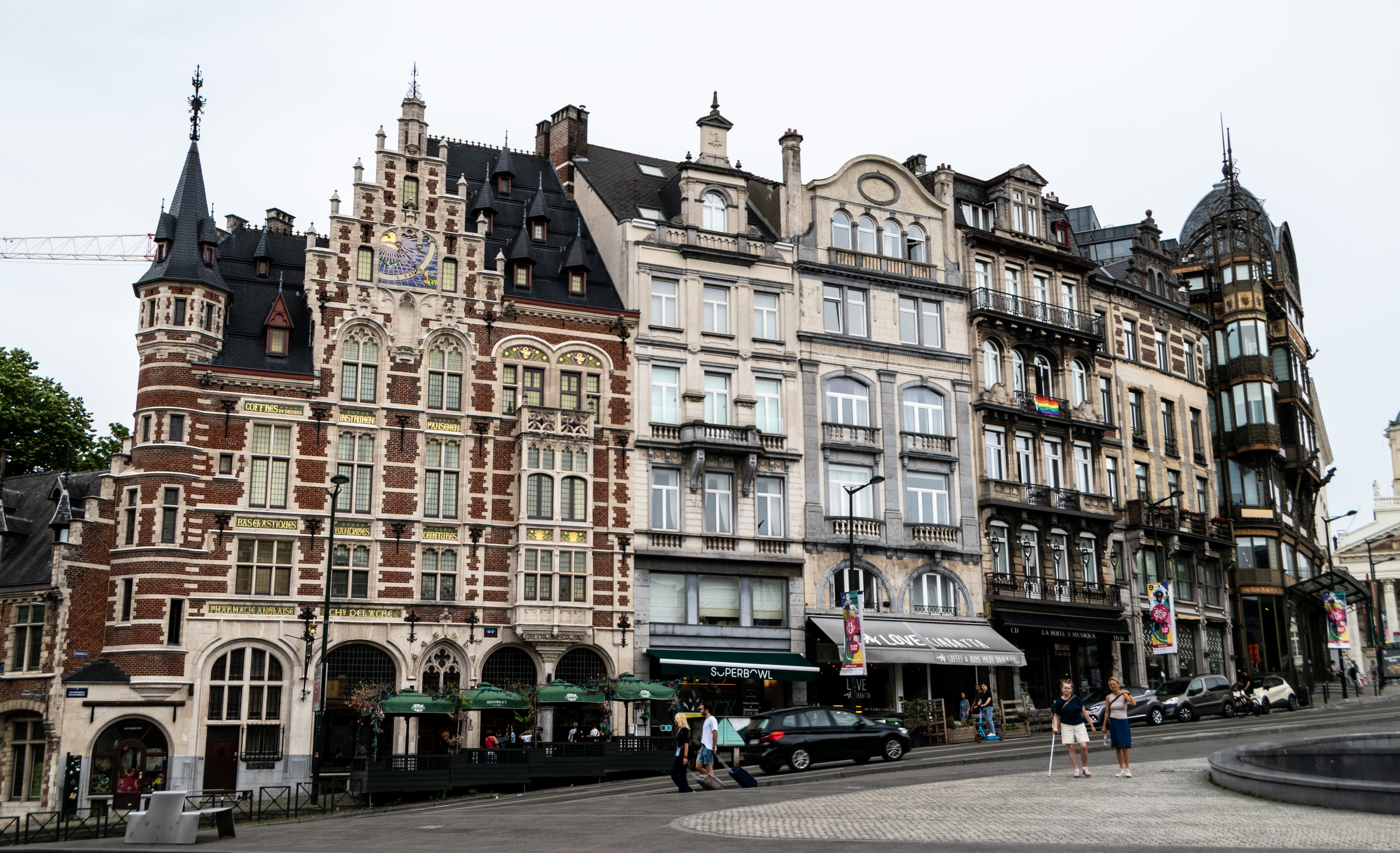
Buildings along the Coudenberg in 2025

By 2012, the Coudenberg was reduced to only a few house numbers (62–70 and 1–5), functioning as a short continuation of the Rue Ravenstein towards the Rue Villa Hermosa.

== Notable buildings ==
Several significant buildings were erected along the Coudenberg in the late 19th and 20th centuries, including:

- The Whirling Ear (1958), sculpture by Alexander Calder
- No. 3–5: Square – Brussels Convention Centre (1958), convention centre
- No. 9–11: Premises of Fontaine F. and The Continental Bodega Company with adjoining tavern (1899)
- No. 64–66: La Pharmacie Anglaise (1898), neo-Gothic shop houses by Paul Saintenoy
- No. 78: Shop house (1898), by G. Vanden Bemden
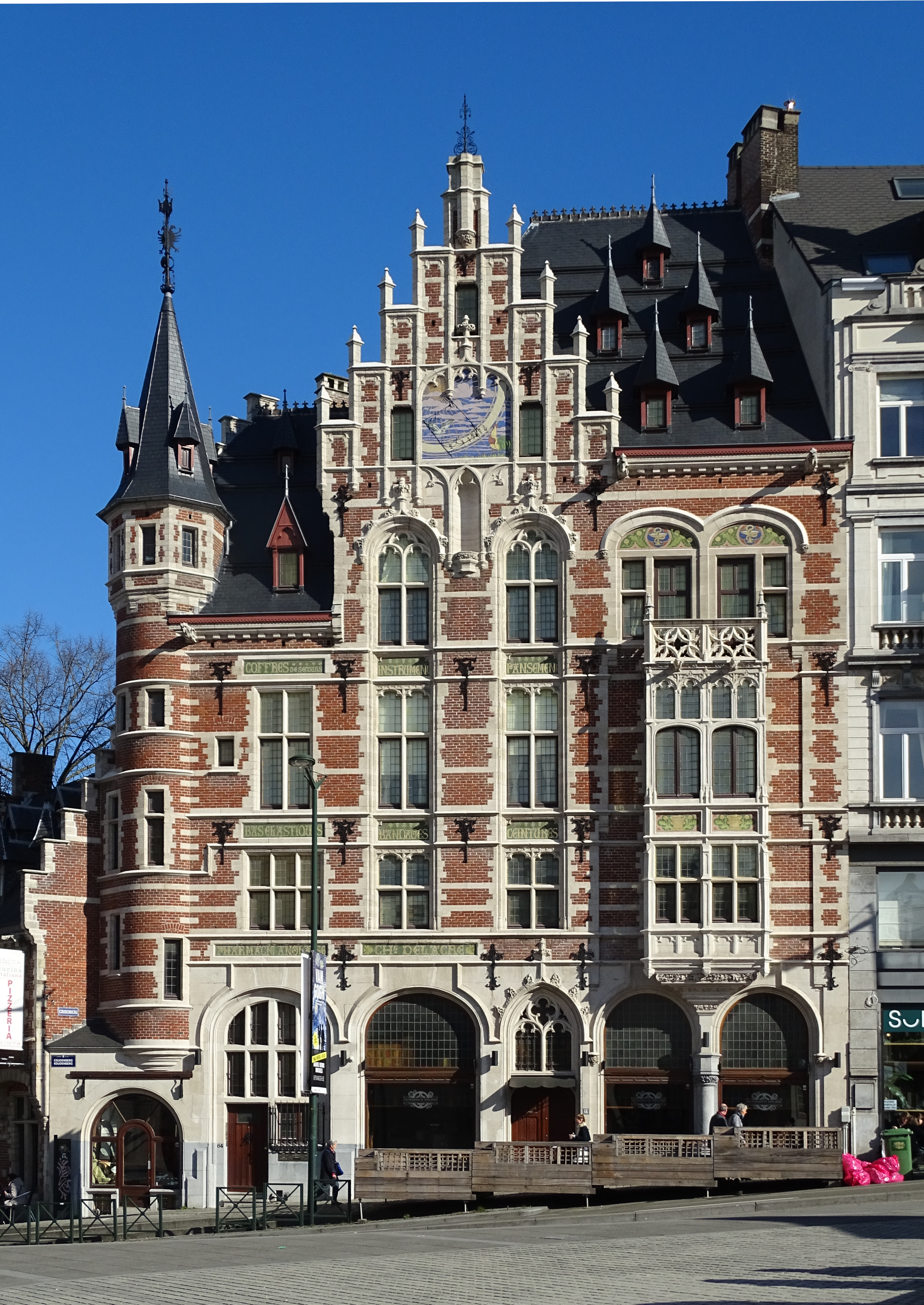
La Pharmacie Anglaise (1898, Saintenoy)

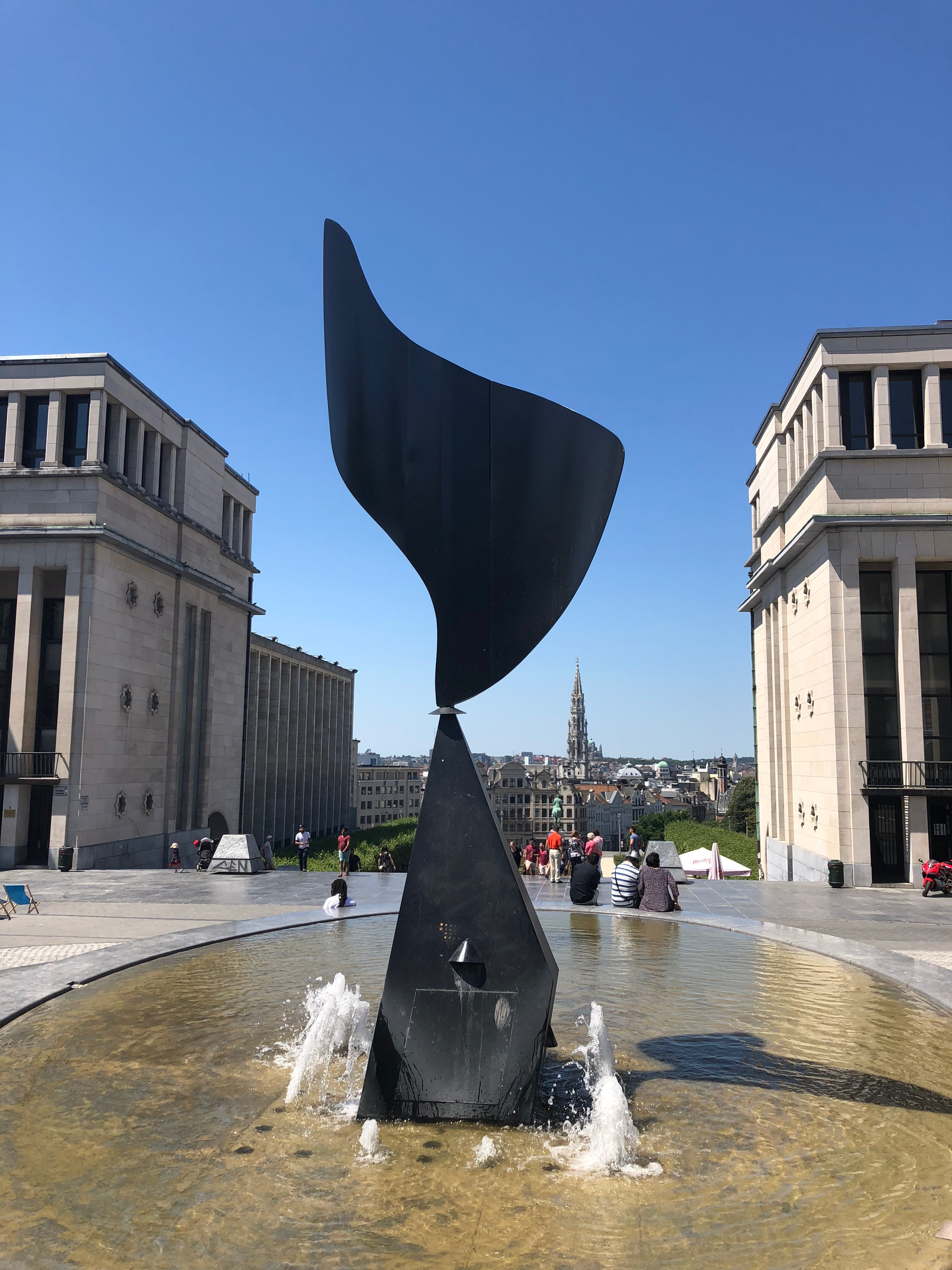
The Whirling Ear (1958, Calder)

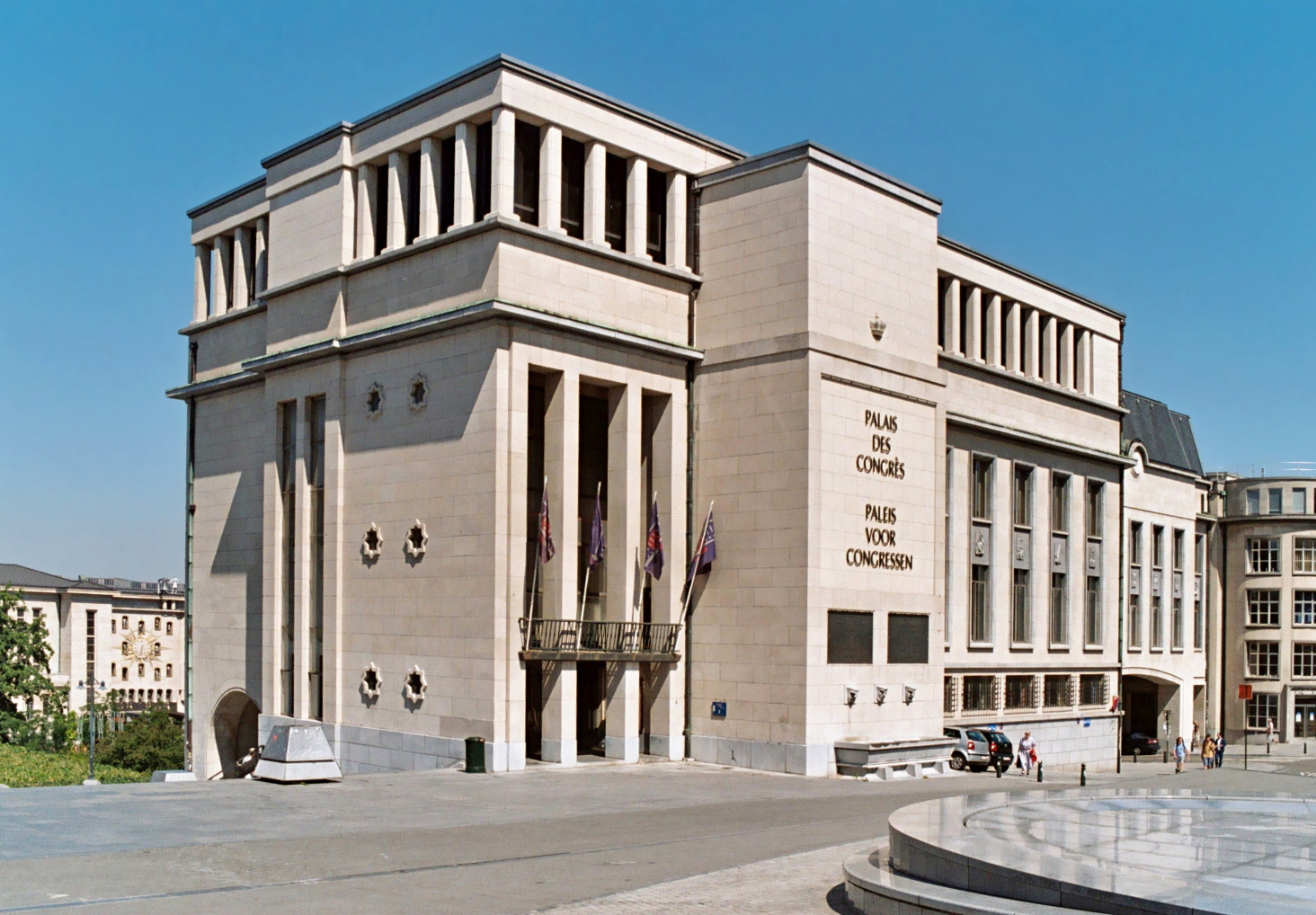
Square – Brussels Convention Centre (1958)

== See also ==
- List of streets in Brussels
- History of Brussels
- Belgium in the long nineteenth century
