= Mont des Arts =

Urban complex and historic site in Brussels, Belgium

Mont des Arts (French); Kunstberg (Dutch)
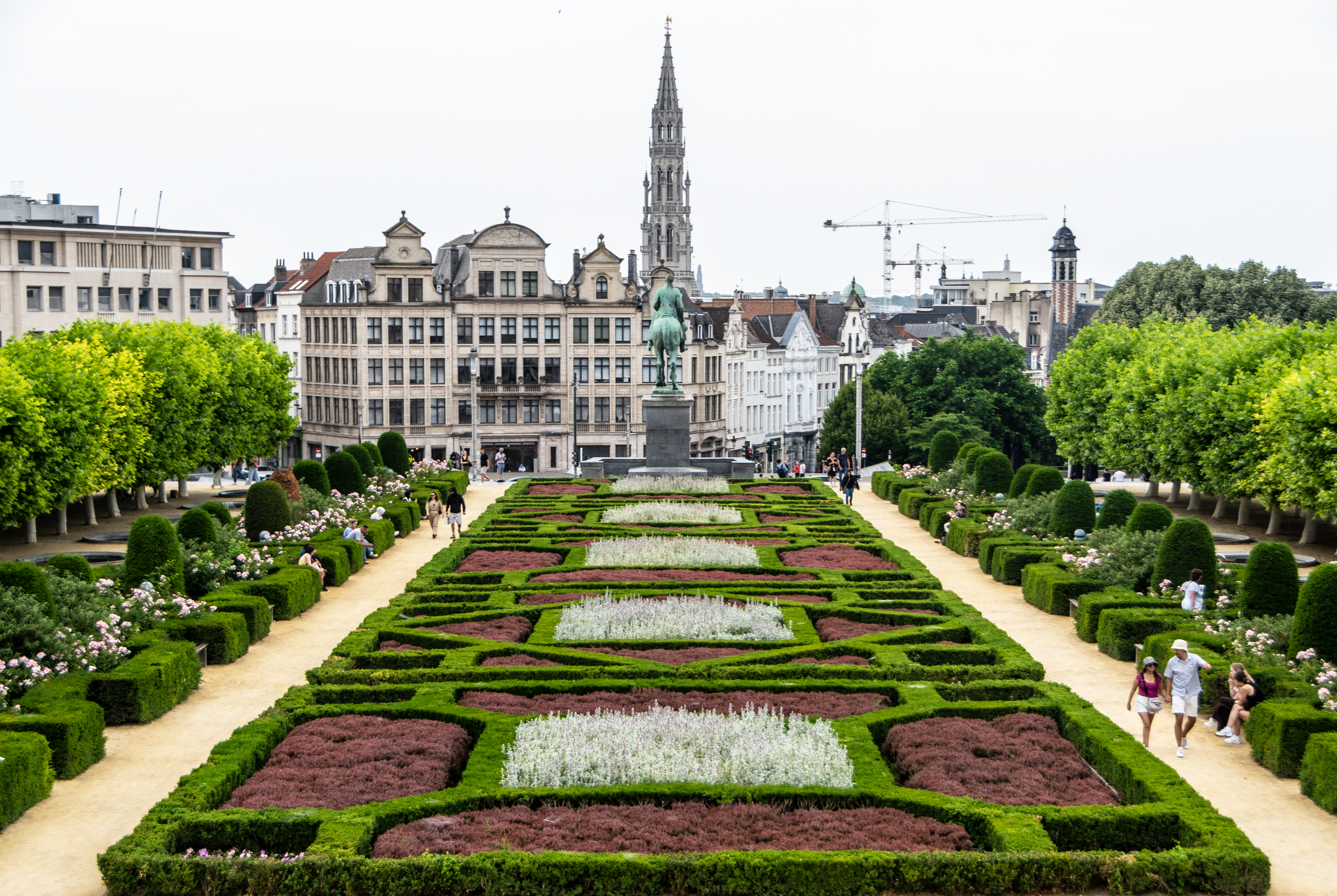
- The spire of Brussels' Town Hall seen from the Mont des Arts/Kunstberg

- Location within Brussels Mont des Arts (Belgium)
- 50°50′38″N 04°21′24″E
- Location: City of Brussels, Brussels-Capital Region, Belgium

History
- Built: 1954–1969

Site notes
- Architect(s): Maurice Houyoux, Jules Ghobert; René Péchère (garden)
- Architectural style: Modernism
- Website: www.montdesarts.com

The Mont des Arts (French, pronounced [mɔ̃ dez‿aʁ]) or Kunstberg (Dutch, pronounced [ˈkʏnstbɛr(ə)x]), meaning "Hill/Mount of the Arts", is an urban complex and historic site in central Brussels, Belgium, including the Royal Library of Belgium (KBR), the National Archives of Belgium, Square – Brussels Convention Centre, and a public garden designed by the landscape architect René Pechère.

The Mont des Arts's development began in the late 19th century as part of an urban renewal project initiated by King Leopold II to accommodate the city's cultural institutions. The first version of the site, designed by the landscape architect Pierre Vacherot, was inaugurated in 1910. Between 1954 and 1969, a major redesign was undertaken by the architects Maurice Houyoux and Jules Ghobert, resulting in the current layout.

This site is located between the Coudenberg/Koudenberg, the Rue Montagne de la Cour/Hofbergstraat and the Place Royale/Koningsplein in its upper part, and the Boulevard de l'Empereur/Keizerslaan and the Place de l'Albertine/Albertinaplein in its lower part.

== History ==
=== Early history ===
The area of the Mont des Arts has undergone many transformations throughout its history. In the Middle Ages, it was home to a diverse population, composed of aristocratic families, as well as craftsmen and tradesmen. Jews settled there until the 14th century, as attested by the old Escaliers des Juifs or Ioode trappen ("Jewish Stairs"), a former series of four steep staircases that led to Brussels' upper town. Later, it used to be a densely populated neighbourhood, the Saint-Roch/Sint-Rochus Quarter (French: Quartier Saint-Roch, Dutch: Sint-Rochuswijk), centred around the now-disappeared Rue des Trois-Têtes/Driehoofdenstraat and the former Place du Palais/Paleisplein (today's Place de la Justice/Gerechtsplein), where Brussels' first courthouse was located.

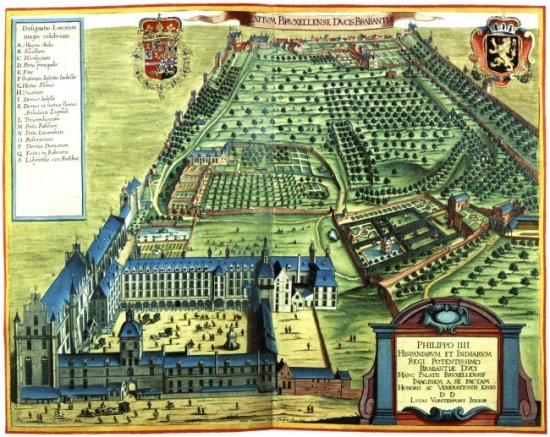
The palace and gardens of Coudenberg in 1659, L. Vorsterman the Younger

Between the 15th and the 18th centuries, the hill overlooking the neighbourhood was known as the Montagne de la Cour/Hofberg ("Hill/Mount of the Court") after the former Palace of Coudenberg also located there. This palace, famous all over Europe, had greatly expanded since it had first become the seat of the Dukes of Brabant, but it was destroyed by fire in 1731. Only a small section of the Rue Montagne de la Cour now remains below the Place Royale/Koningsplein. The district's development over the next centuries raised one of the most complex questions in the town-planning history of Brussels: the link between the upper and the lower town through the reorganisation of the Montagne de la Cour.

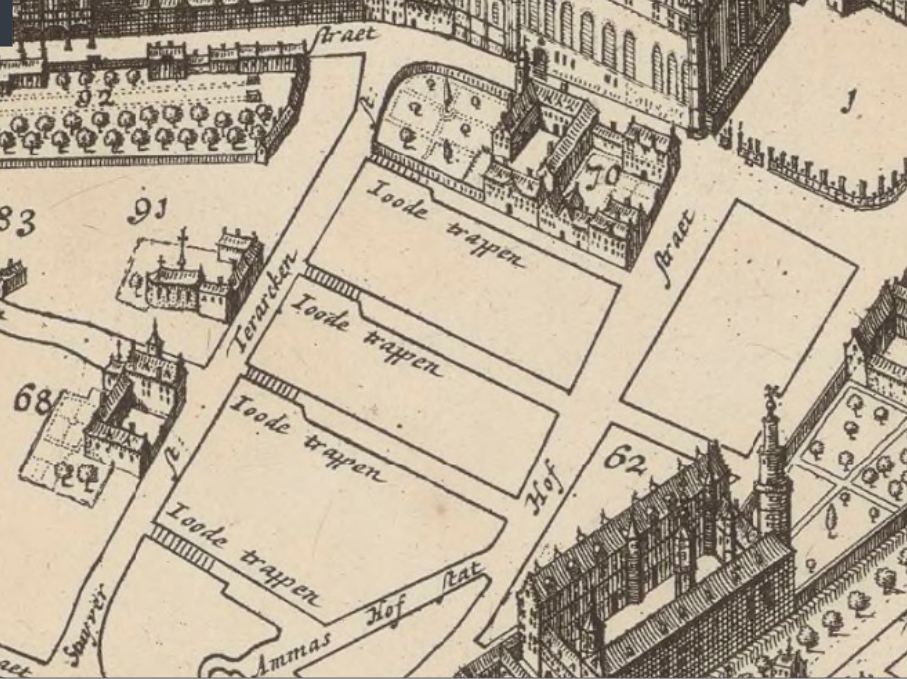
Map of central Brussels in 1695, showing the four Ioode trappen ("Jewish Stairs") in what was once known as the Jewish quarter

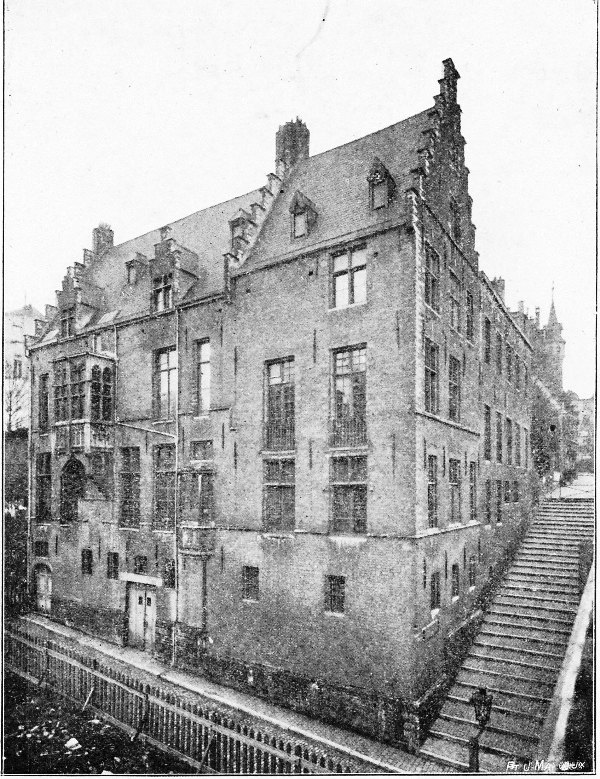
The "Jewish Stairs" in 1913 with the Hôtel Ravenstein on the left

=== First Mont des Arts (1910–1954) ===
By the end of the 19th century, King Leopold II had the idea to convert the site into an arts' quarter and bought the whole neighbourhood. Various architects and urban planners were called upon to draw plans of the buildings, which were to accommodate all kinds of cultural institutions. In the meantime, the City of Brussels' then-mayor, Charles Buls, had laid out a modest plan for the Saint-Roch district. His urbanistic and aesthetic conceptions were totally opposed to those of Leopold II. The burgomaster wanted to preserve as much as possible of the old district, whilst the king imagined grandiose projects for his capital. Very isolated, Buls was not followed by the municipal council, which voted for the king's project on 19 November 1894. Sickened, Buls resigned five years later.

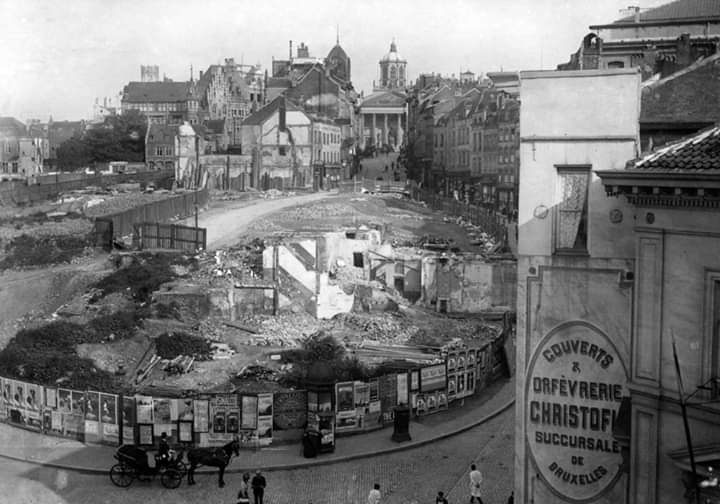
Destruction of the Saint-Roch/Sint-Rochus Quarter in 1897–98 to make space for the Mont des Arts/Kunstberg

After the demolition of the old buildings in 1897–98, the site turned into an urban void because the project lacked sufficient finance. An agreement was finally signed in 1903 between the City of Brussels and the Belgian state for the construction of the Central Station and the creation of the Mont des Arts, at the same time as the complete reorganisation of the old Saint-Roch and Putterie/Putterij districts. To increase the area's appeal ahead of the Brussels International Exposition of 1910, the king ordered the French landscape architect Jules Vacherot to design a temporary garden on the hill. It featured a park and a monumental staircase with cascading fountains and terraces descending the gentle slope from the Place Royale down to the Boulevard de l'Empereur/Keizerslaan. In 1910, a year after Leopold II's death, the new park was inaugurated by his successor, King Albert I.

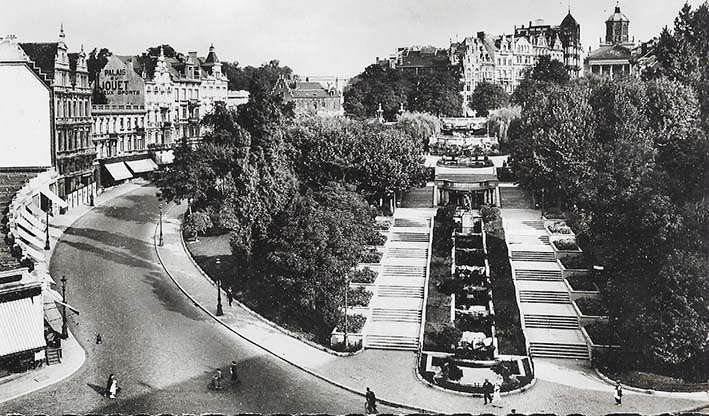
The Mont des Arts in the 1920s, showing Vacherot's temporary garden and steps

=== Second Mont des Arts (1954–present) ===
Although Vacherot's garden was conceived as temporary, it became a well-appreciated green area in the heart of the capital, but when the plans for the Mont des Arts were revived by the end of the 1930s, it had to be demolished to make way for a new square at the centre of the urban renewal project. The project was entrusted jointly to the architects Maurice Houyoux and Jules Ghobert. Its implementation, however, was delayed until the 1950s. Between 1954 and 1969, the park and its surroundings gave way to massive, severe geometric structures such as the Royal Library of Belgium (KBR) and the Congress Palace. The new geometric garden, designed by the landscape architect René Pechère, was built upon the concrete slab covering the Albertine/Albertina car park.

The construction of the Royal Library led to the complete disappearance of the old Palace of Orange-Nassau, the Nassau Palace, with the exception of St. George's Chapel, also known as the Nassau Chapel. The original plans envisaged dismantling the chapel and reconstructing it elsewhere within the Royal Library. Faced with a wave of protests, it was decided in 1961–62 to integrate it into the library complex. After its restoration, the chapel was inaugurated as an exhibition space on 17 February 1969, in the presence of King Baudouin and Queen Fabiola. The completed Mont des Arts was inaugurated later that year.

Since its inauguration, the Mont des Arts has undergone several renovation and modernisation projects. The garden was restored from 2001 onwards, and the Congress Palace underwent a major refurbishment between 2005 and 2010. The project included the construction of a new glass-cube entrance, designed by the Brussels architectural firm A.2R.C. The renovated building, known as Square – Brussels Meeting Centre, was later renamed Square – Brussels Convention Centre. In 2017, the monumental fountain at the foot of the garden's terraces was comprehensively restored. Further renovation work, begun in August 2024, was completed in April 2025, with the replacement and repair of its pumps, pipes, jets and other components. The garden's lighting system was also modernised, including the installation of LED lighting in its smaller fountains. In October 2025, the carillon on the rear façade of the Dynasty Palace was restored and returned to operation. Originally installed in 1965, its hydraulic mechanism, which operates the moving figures accompanying the clock, was replaced by an electric system. In March 2026, a panoramic glass lift connecting the Mont des Arts to the Royal Library's rooftop terrace was inaugurated.

== Places of interest ==
=== Royal Library of Belgium ===
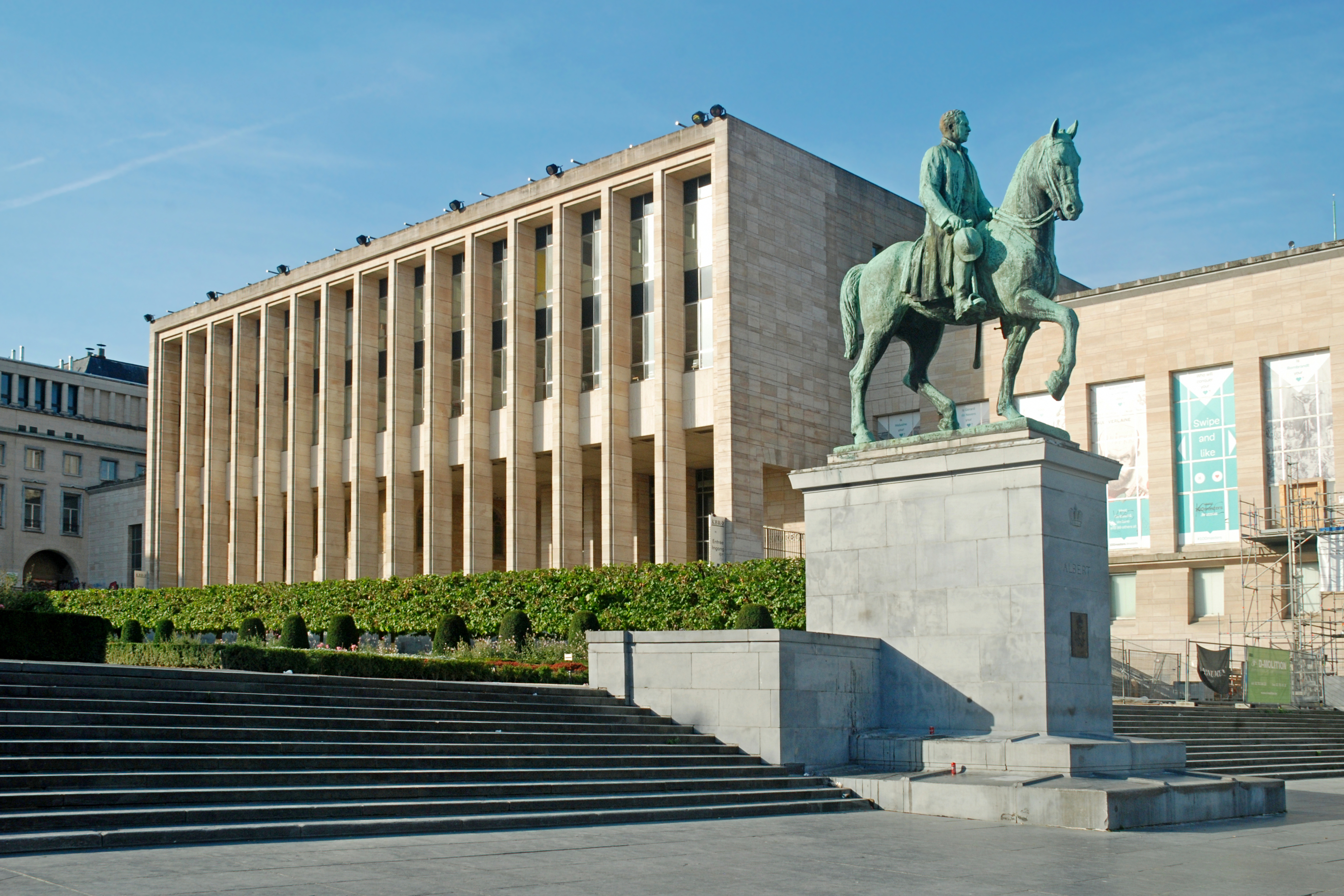
The Royal Library of Belgium (KBR) and the equestrian statue of Albert I

The most important building on the Mont des Arts is the Royal Library of Belgium (KBR), sometimes nicknamed Albertine in French or Albertina in Dutch, the national library of Belgium. The library owns several collections of historical importance, like the Library of the Dukes of Burgundy, and is the depository for all books ever published in Belgium or abroad by Belgian authors. There are four million bound volumes in the Royal Library, including a rare book collection numbering 45,000 works. The library has more than 750,000 prints, drawings and photographs, 150,000 maps and plans, and more than 250,000 objects, from coins to scales to monetary weights. This coin collection holds one of the most valuable coins in the field of numismatics, a fifth-century Sicilian tetradrachm. The library also houses the Center for American Studies, a rich American Studies collection of 30,000 books in open stacks, as well as U.S. newspapers and databases.

=== Square – Brussels Convention Centre ===
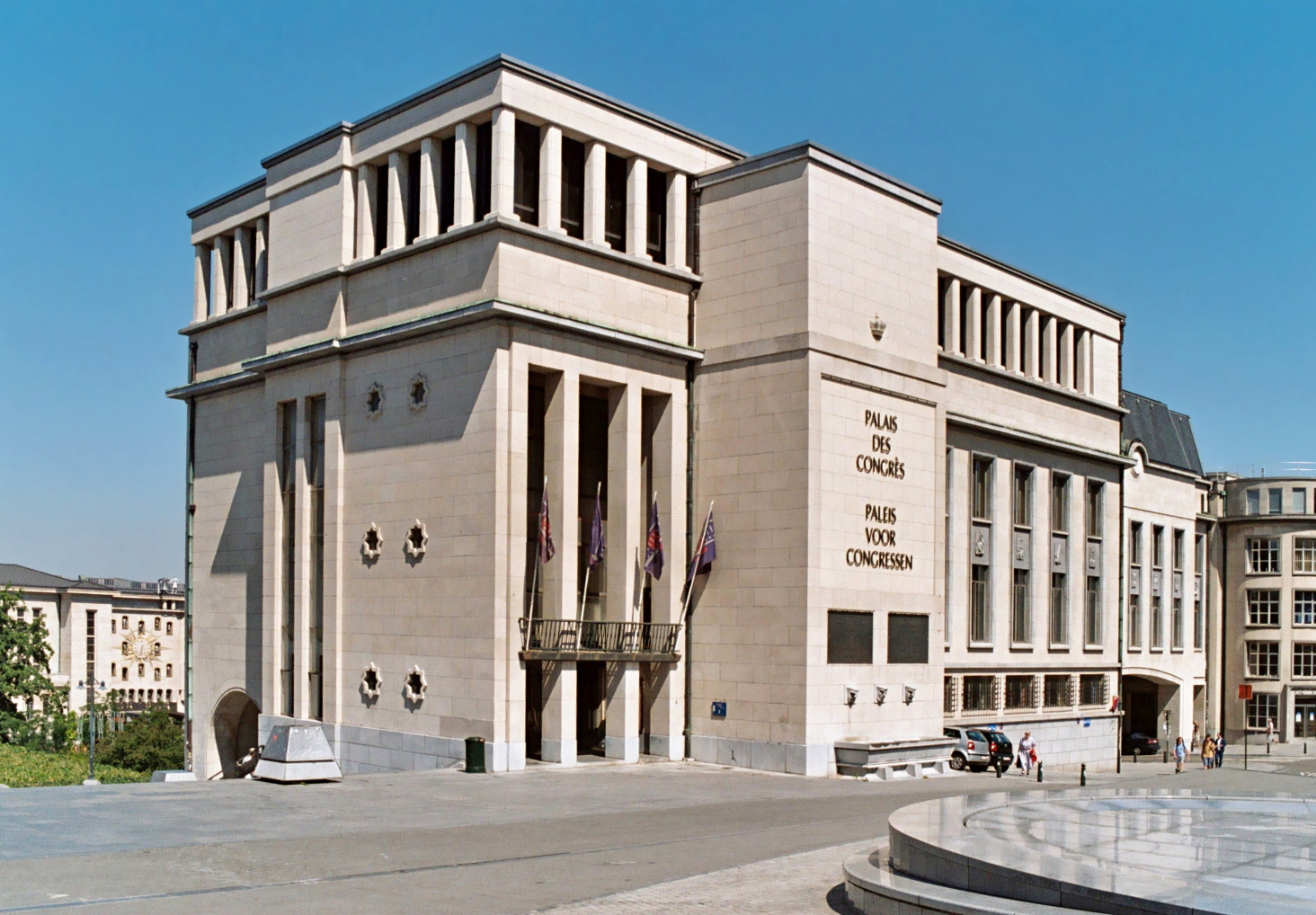
The former Congress Palace, housing Square – Brussels Convention Centre

Overlooking the city from the hillside of the Mont des Arts is Square – Brussels Convention Centre, the main convention centre in the City of Brussels. It is housed in the former Congress Palace, which was designed by Jules Ghobert and Maurice Houyoux and built for the 1958 Brussels World's Fair (Expo 58). Square – Brussels Convention Centre's landmark feature is the three-storey, 16-metre-tall (52 ft) glass cube that forms the main entry to the premises. The cube has a treelike structure and the overall aesthetic is based on transparency and light. A terrace leads to the upper access situated on the Mont des Arts. Works of art decorate the convention centre's foyers, including expansive murals by Paul Delvaux, René Magritte and Louis Van Lint.

=== National Archives of Belgium ===
Next to the Mont des Arts, on the Rue de Ruysbroeck/Ruysbroeckstraat, is the National Archives of Belgium, the main depository of the State Archives of Belgium, holding over 70 km (43 mi) of archives. The National Archives preserves the archives of the central institutions of the Burgundian Netherlands, the Spanish Netherlands and the Austrian Netherlands until 1795, of the central public authorities of the French period (1795–1815) and of the United Kingdom of the Netherlands (1815–1830). It also holds the archives of the central institutions of the national, and later federal government, from the foundation of Belgium (1830) until today, except for the archives of the Ministries of Defence and of Foreign Affairs.

=== Mont des Arts carillon ===
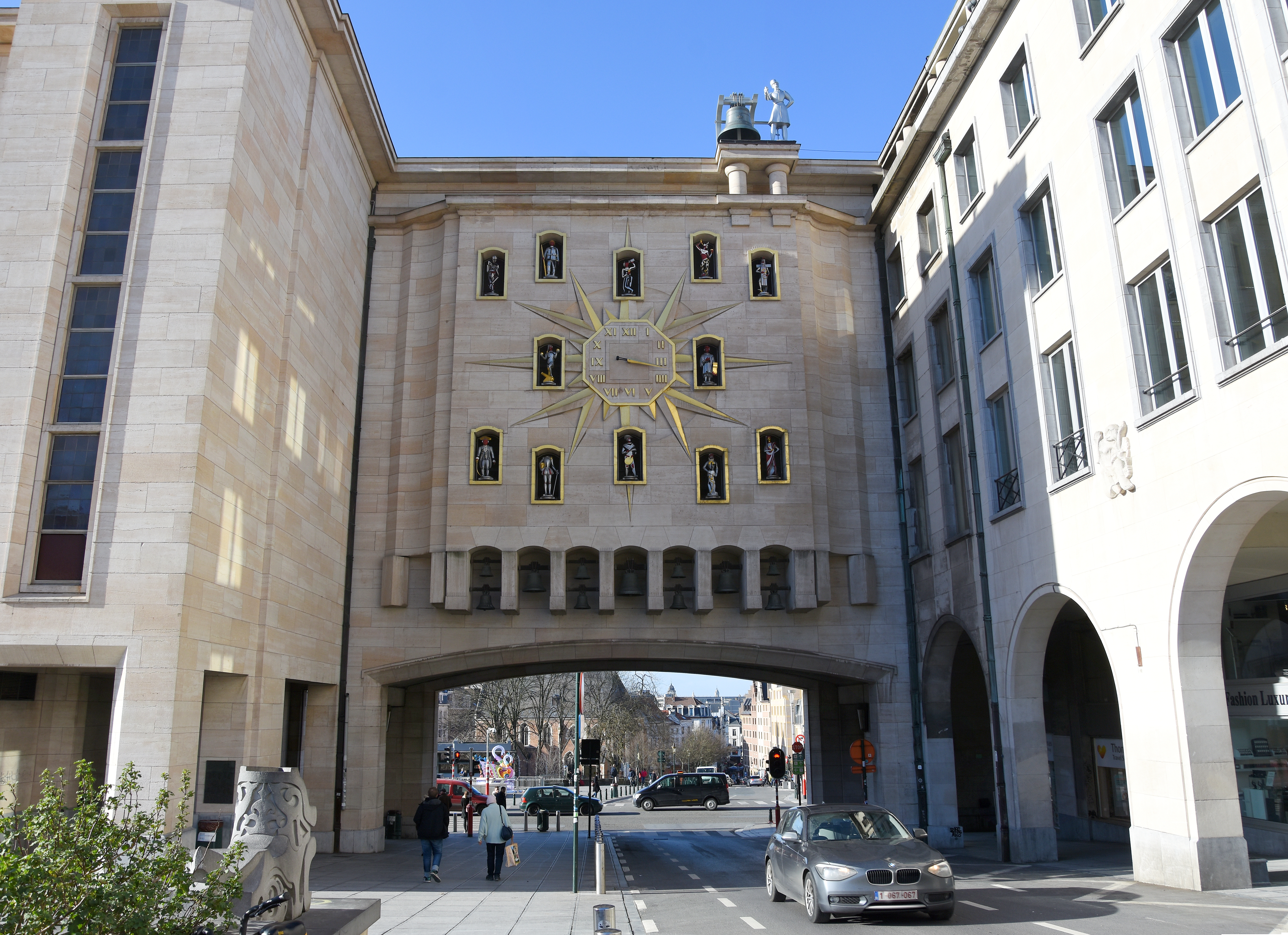
Mont des Arts carillon

The Mont des Arts carillon is composed of twenty-four bells produced by the Paccard bell foundry and can be seen on the rear façade of the Dynasty Palace. The carillon was created as part of the buildings erected on the Mont des Arts for Expo 58 and is located in an arcade spanning the Rue des Arts/Kunststraat. Small recesses depict twelve figures, characters from Brussels' history and folklore. They rotate to the sounds of the chimes, which consist of twenty-four bells. The twelve-pointed, star-shaped clock on the façade was designed by Ghobert. A bronze automaton (a jacquemart) at the very top of the arcade strikes the hour.

=== Statue of Albert I ===
To the west on the Place de l'Albertine/Albertinaplein, at the point where the Mont des Arts joins the Boulevard de l'Empereur, rises the equestrian statue of Albert I, third King of the Belgians. It was created by the sculptor Alfred Courtens and inaugurated in 1951. The imposing bronze equestrian statue is placed high on the pedestal made of blue stone blocks, overlooking the city centre. Albert I is classically depicted as a soldier king wearing a military coat and holding a helmet. The style is reminiscent of that of the equestrian statue of Leopold II on the Place du Trône/Troonplein, whose author, Thomas Vinçotte, was Courtens's teacher.

== Panoramic view and surroundings ==
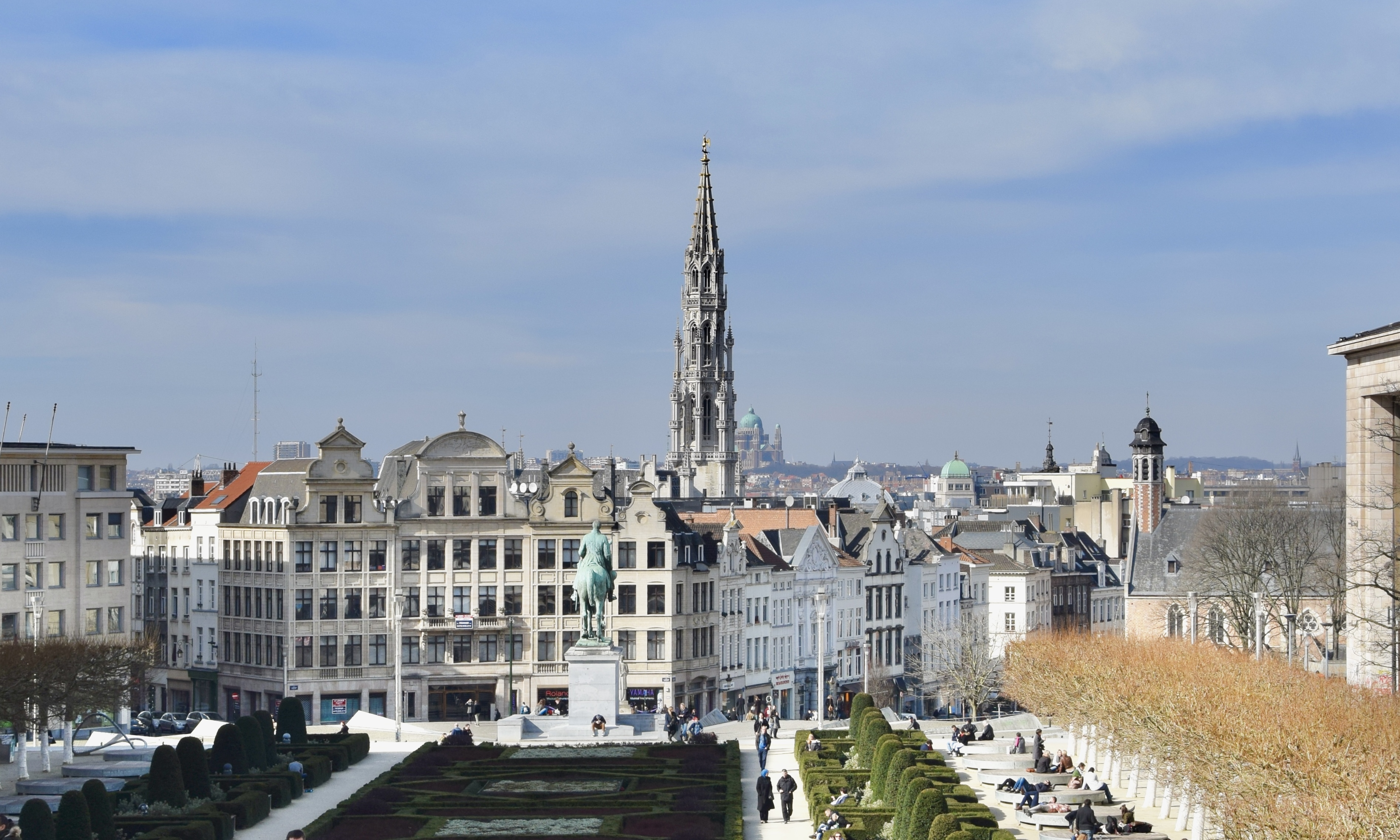
Panorama of the city centre from the Mont des Arts

The Mont des Arts is a popular viewpoint in Brussels. Though the glass and steel cube forming the entrance to the convention centre has modified the upper part of the complex, the perspective created by Péchère has largely been preserved. From the elevated vantage point, the tower of Brussels' Town Hall on the Grand-Place/Grote Markt (main square) is visible. On a sunny day, the Basilica of the Sacred Heart in Koekelberg and the Atomium on the Heysel/Heizel Plateau in northern Brussels can be seen. From the other end, looking up towards the Place Royale, the dome of the Church of St. James on Coudenberg closes the perspective.

Major tourist attractions are located within walking distance of the Mont des Arts: the Musical Instruments Museum (MIM), the Oldmasters Museum, the Magritte Museum and the Fin-de-Siècle Museum of the Royal Museums of Fine Arts, the Royal Palace, and the Cathedral of St. Michael and St. Gudula.

== See also ==
- List of parks and gardens in Brussels
- North–South connection
- Brusselisation
- History of Brussels
- Culture of Belgium
- Belgium in the long nineteenth century
