= Equestrian statue of Albert I, Brussels =

Equestrian statue of Albert I
- Statue équestre d'Albert I (French); Ruiterstandbeeld van Albert I (Dutch)
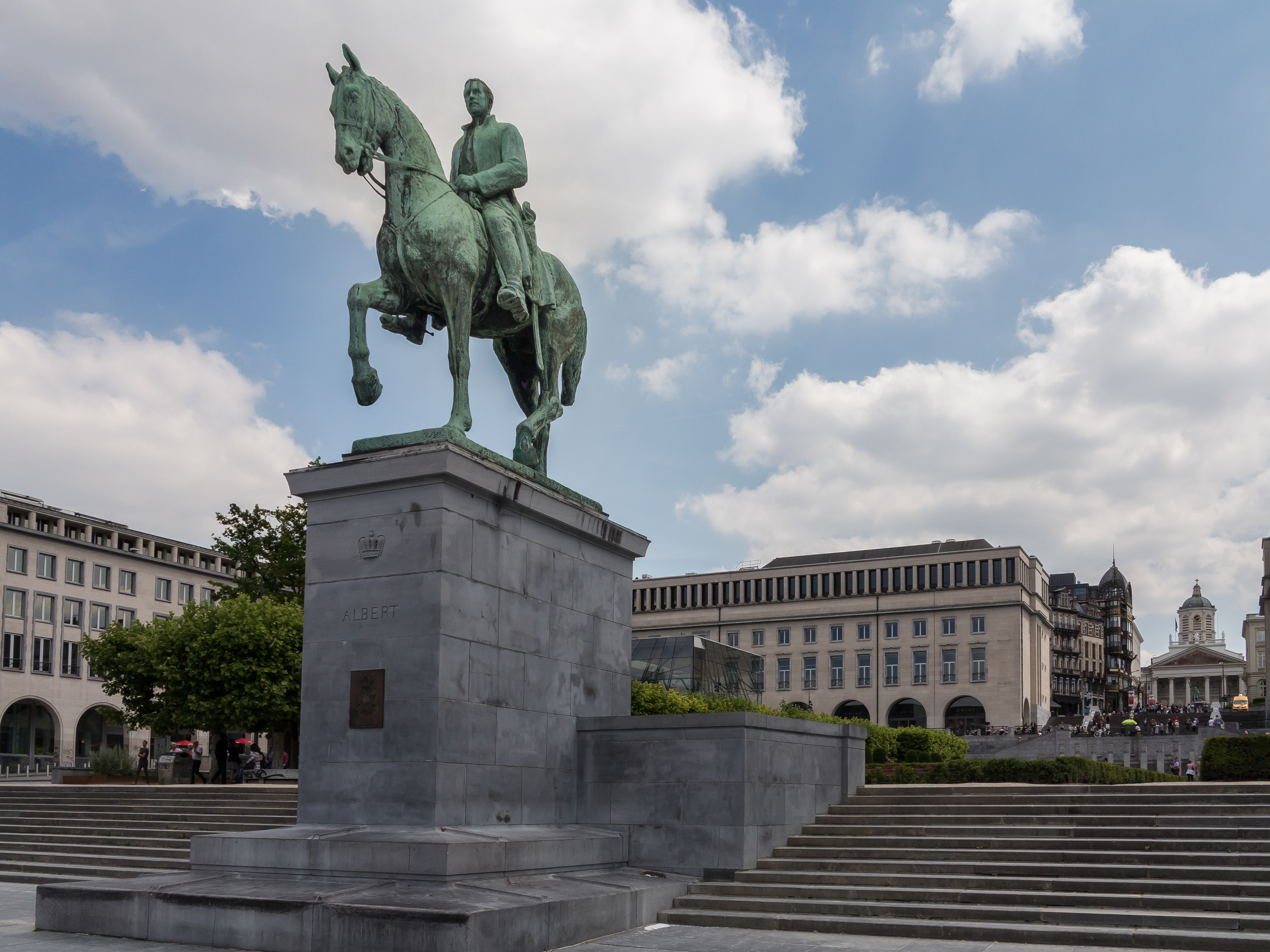
- Statue of King Albert I
- Interactive map of Equestrian statue of Albert I
- Location: Place de l'Albertine / Albertinaplein; 1000 City of Brussels, Brussels-Capital Region, Belgium
- Coordinates: 50°50′39″N 4°21′22.5″E
- Designer: Alfred Courtens
- Type: Equestrian statue
- Completion date: 1951
- Dedicated to: King Albert I

The equestrian statue of Albert I (French: Statue équestre d'Albert I; Dutch: Ruiterstandbeeld van Albert I) is a bronze equestrian statue erected in Brussels, Belgium, in memory of King Albert I, third King of the Belgians. It was created by the sculptor Alfred Courtens and inaugurated in 1951.

The statue stands on the Place de l'Albertine/Albertinaplein, at the point where the Mont des Arts/Kunstberg joins the Boulevard de l'Empereur/Keizerslaan, and a few tens of metres from the Royal Library of Belgium (KBR).

== History ==
The accidental death of King Albert I in 1934 aroused great emotion in Belgium, prompting many cities to pay homage to him. In Brussels, the question of whether this tribute should take the form of a monument, architectural feature, or urban development, was the subject of debate. Ultimately, the classical and traditional option of sculpture prevailed.

The first project by the sculptor Alfred Courtens in the form of a 1.5 metres (4 ft 11 in) model was submitted in 1943, then revised and finally approved in 1946. The Second World War and a shortage of materials further delayed the monument's construction. Finally, in 1951, the bronze sculpture, cast by the Compagnie des Bronzes de Bruxelles, was brought to the site in three parts to facilitate transport (the body of the horse, its head, and the effigy of the king) and installed on a pedestal designed by Jules Ghobert, one of the architects of the Royal Library of Belgium (KBR).

== Description ==
The imposing bronze equestrian statue is placed high on the pedestal made of blue stone blocks, overlooking the city centre. Albert I is classically depicted as a soldier king wearing a military coat and holding a helmet. The style is reminiscent of that of the equestrian statue of Leopold II on the Place du Trône/Troonplein, whose author, Thomas Vinçotte, was Courtens's teacher. The sculptor justified his decision to depict his model bareheaded by the fear that the shadow of the helmet would obscure his face.

The monument is part of an overall project including the Mont des Arts and the Royal Library of Belgium, dedicated to Albert I and nicknamed Albertine in French or Albertina in Dutch (today KBR), whose first stone would not be laid, however, until three years after the statue's inauguration.

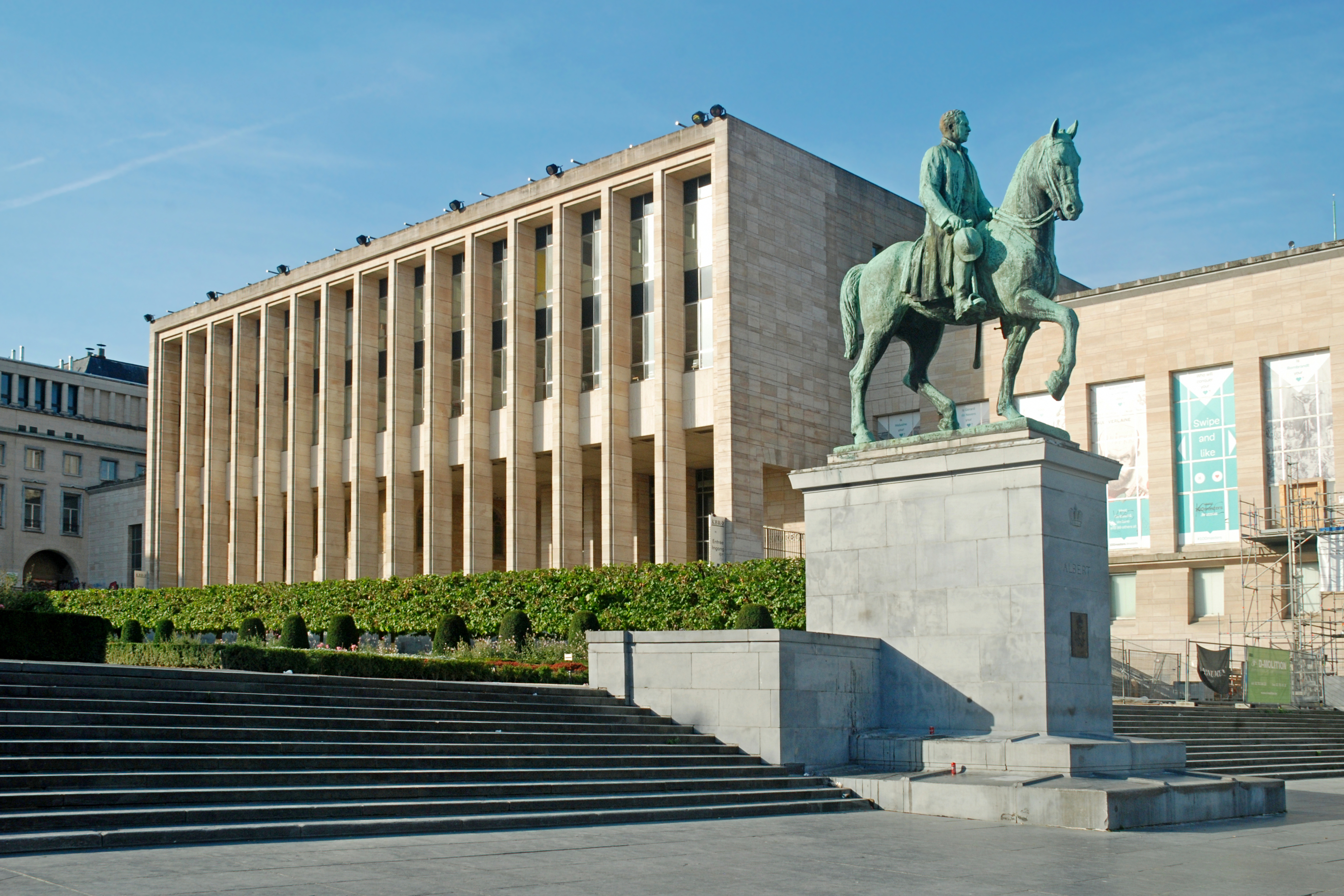
The Royal Library of Belgium (KBR) and the equestrian statue of Albert I

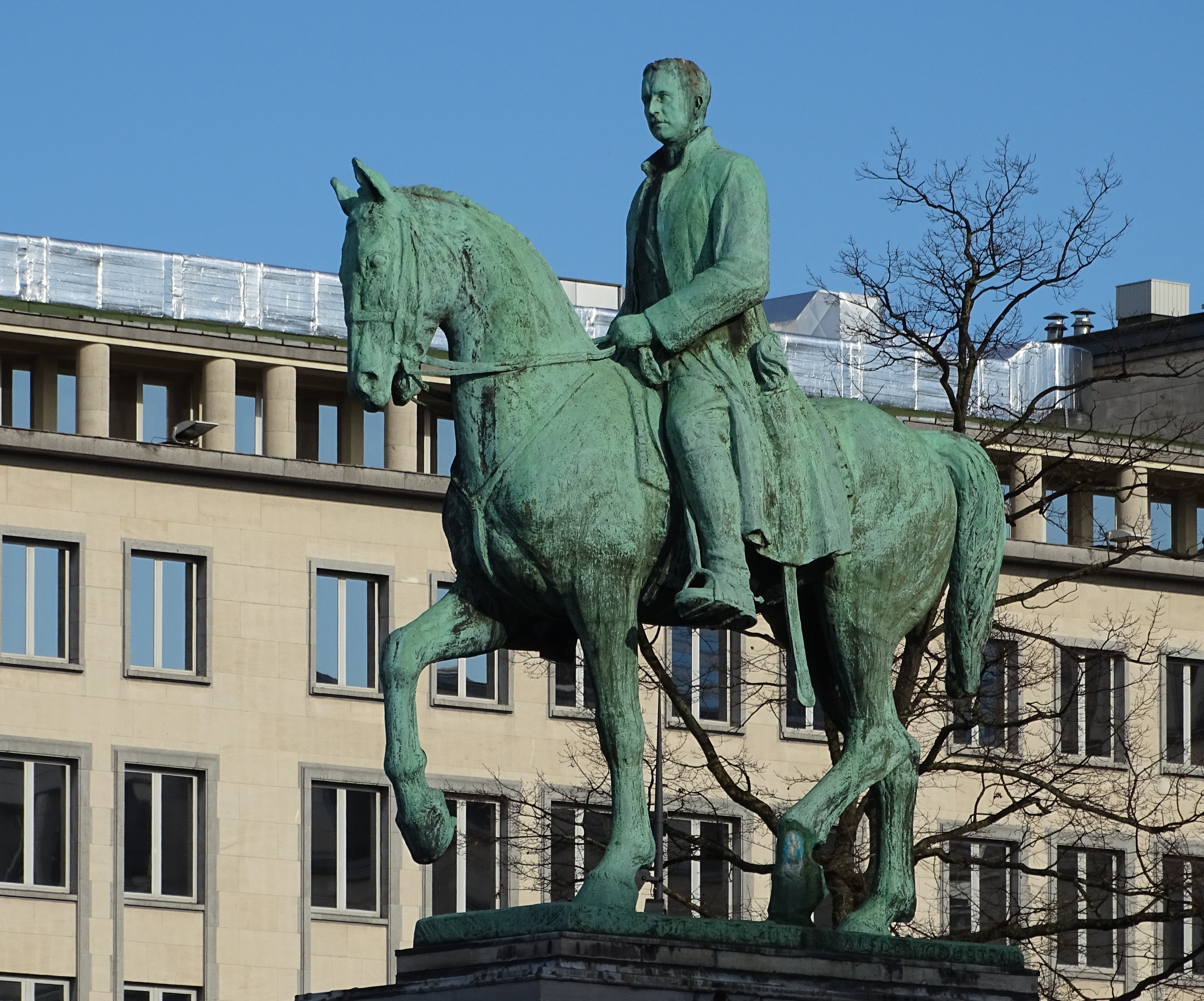
Equestrian statue

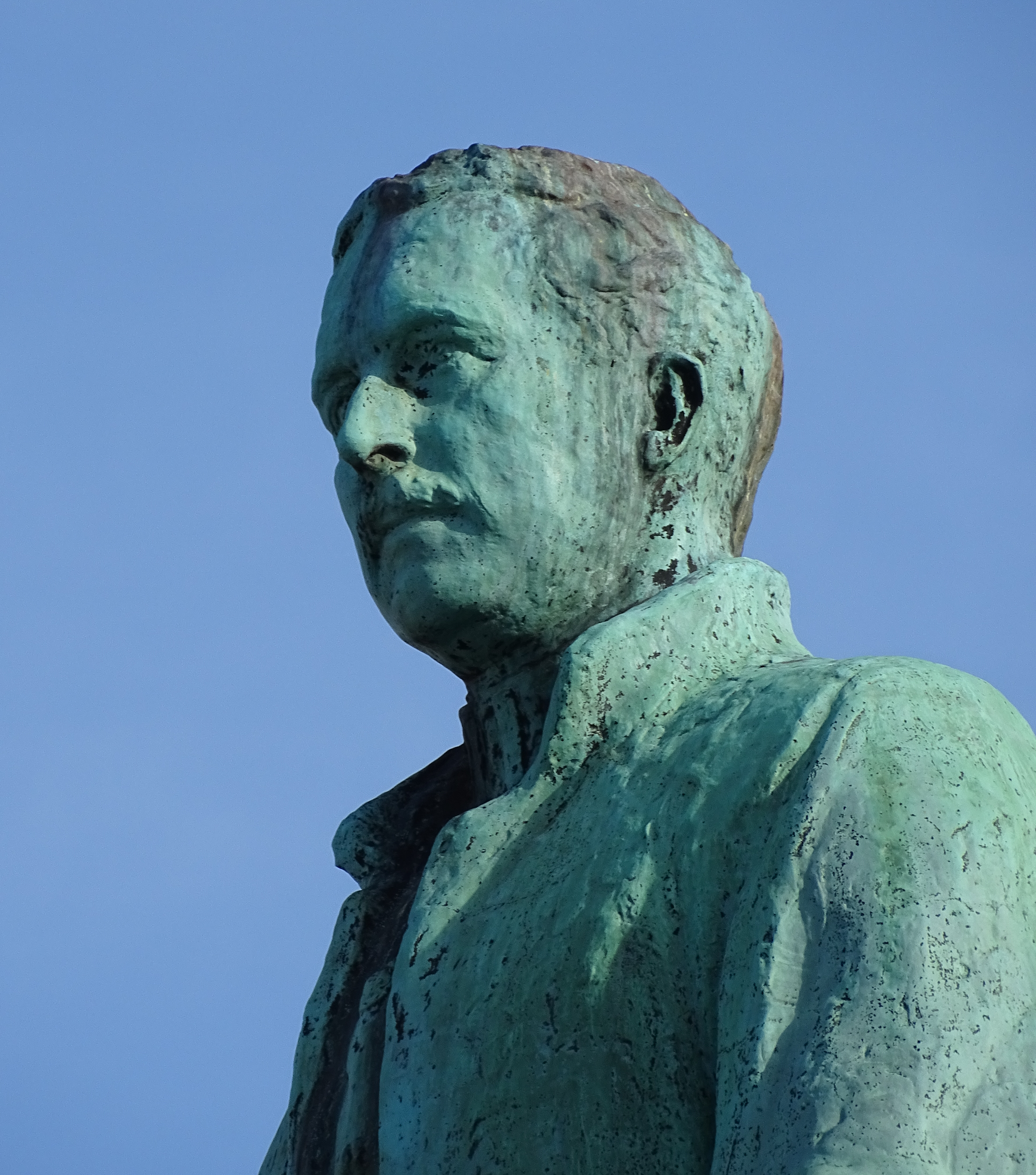
Closeup of King Albert I

== See also ==
- Sculpture in Brussels
- History of Brussels
- Culture of Belgium
- Belgium in the long nineteenth century
