= La Pharmacie Anglaise =

Former pharmacy in Brussels, Belgium

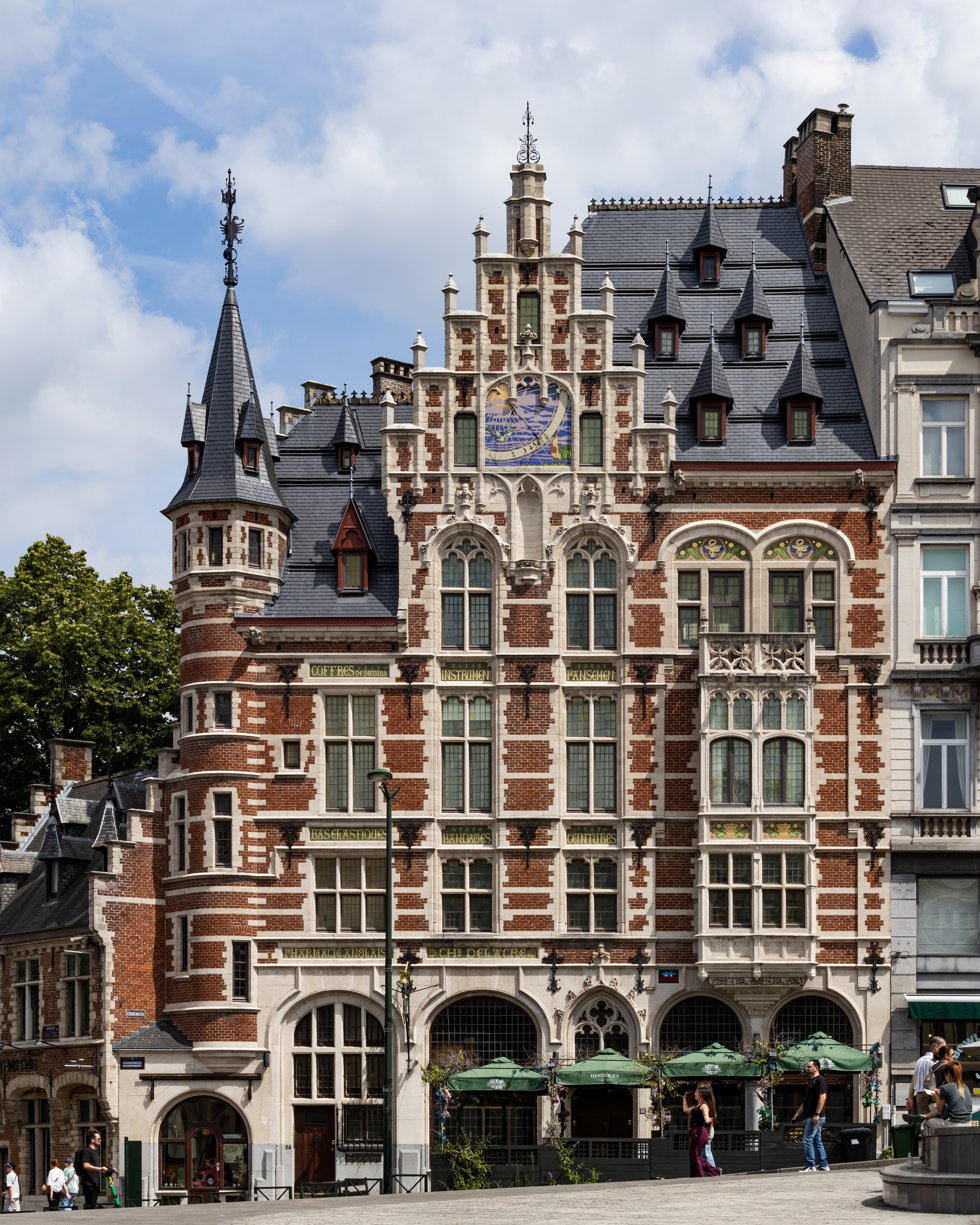
- La Pharmacie Anglaise seen from the Coudenberg/Koudenberg
- Former names: Pharmacie Anglaise Ch. Delacre (French)

General information
- Type: Pharmacy
- Architectural style: Gothic Revival; Renaissance Revival; Art Nouveau
- Location: Coudenberg / Koudenberg 62, 1000 City of Brussels, Brussels-Capital Region, Belgium
- Coordinates: 50°50′35″N 4°21′30″E
- Construction started: 1896
- Completed: 1900
- Client: Charles Delacre

Design and construction
- Architect: Paul Saintenoy
- Designations: Protected (05/09/1996)

Other information
- Public transit: Brussels-Central; 1 5 Gare Centrale/Centraal Station and Parc/Park

Website
- lapharmacieanglaise.com

La Pharmacie Anglaise, formerly known as the Pharmacie Anglaise Ch. Delacre (transl. English Pharmacy Ch. Delacre), is a neo-Gothic corner building in Brussels, Belgium, designed by the architect Paul Saintenoy. Located on the Coudenberg/Koudenberg, it stands on a triangular plot with an adjoining warehouse on the Rue Villa Hermosa/Villa Hermosastraat. The richly decorated frontage with a corner tower draws inspiration from late Gothic architecture, in harmony with neighbouring medieval buildings such as the Hôtel Ravenstein.

== History ==
Charles Delacre, originally a pharmacist, began selling chocolate in 1870, initially marketed as a fortifying food and medicine. He opened a small shop near the Royal Palace and produced chocolate in a small factory in Ixelles. His success led him to expand production, opening a larger factory in the Flemish municipality of Vilvoorde in 1891. Delacre also developed chocolate bars referencing the Belgian royal family, such as Roi et Reine, and was appointed Purveyor to the Court in 1879. Over time, he began incorporating chocolate into biscuits, which became Belgian classics.

Between 1879 and 1899, the Rue Courbe was laid out according to Henri Maquet's 1876 plan and Alphonse Balat's 1882 museum design. The demolition of the Saint-Roch/Sint-Rochus Quarter (French: Quartier Saint-Roch, Dutch: Sint-Rochuswijk) from 1897 allowed the construction of commercial buildings connecting the Rue Montagne de la Cour/Hofbergstraat to the Rue Ravenstein/Ravensteinstraat.

In 1896–97, the warehouse adjoining Delacre's pharmacy was built, serving as a chemical products laboratory and storage, with Art Nouveau influences. Construction of the pharmacy began in 1895 and was completed in 1898. Designed by Paul Saintenoy in a neo-Gothic, neo-Renaissance style, the four-storey building features turrets, wrought iron, a sundial with mosaics, and numerous windows of varying sizes, some inscribed with references to bandages and first-aid kits. The pharmacy follows the design principles of an English pharmacy, giving the building its name. The warehouse and pharmacy were connected between 1898 and 1900.

In 1928, the warehouse was incorporated into the Old England department store, with renovations including remodelling of the ground floor, replacement of the glazed roof with clerestory lighting, and alterations to parts of the façade. Further modifications in 1939 added an attic to the rear façade and converted the upper levels into apartments.

Over 120 years later, the former pharmacy houses a cocktail bar, opened in 2018 by Francesco Ravo. The bar preserves elements of the original pharmacy interior, including the counter, cabinets, and old apothecary bottles, while repurposing them for cocktails.

== Architecture ==
=== Exterior ===
The pharmacy rises three to four storeys with six uneven bays beneath a two-part slate roof, its volumes adjusted to the sloping site. The asymmetrical façade combines brick and natural stone in banded masonry, accented by string courses and wrought-iron anchors. A stepped gable crowns the right-hand section, while a round stair tower with an octagonal spire and wrought-iron weather vane marks the corner. Decorative elements include tracery, crockets, finials, foliage, and vine motifs.

The warehouse was built in brick with an iron structure on a rectangular plan, comprising a basement, five storeys, and three bays beneath a tiled gable roof. The façade featured a glazed iron skeleton with profiled posts, palmette capitals, and continuous riveted lintels framing wooden windows over brick spandrels. In 1907, a glazed roof structure was added, later replaced by clerestory lighting in 1928, when the ground floor was remodelled with a recessed portal. The rear façade gained an attic in 1939.

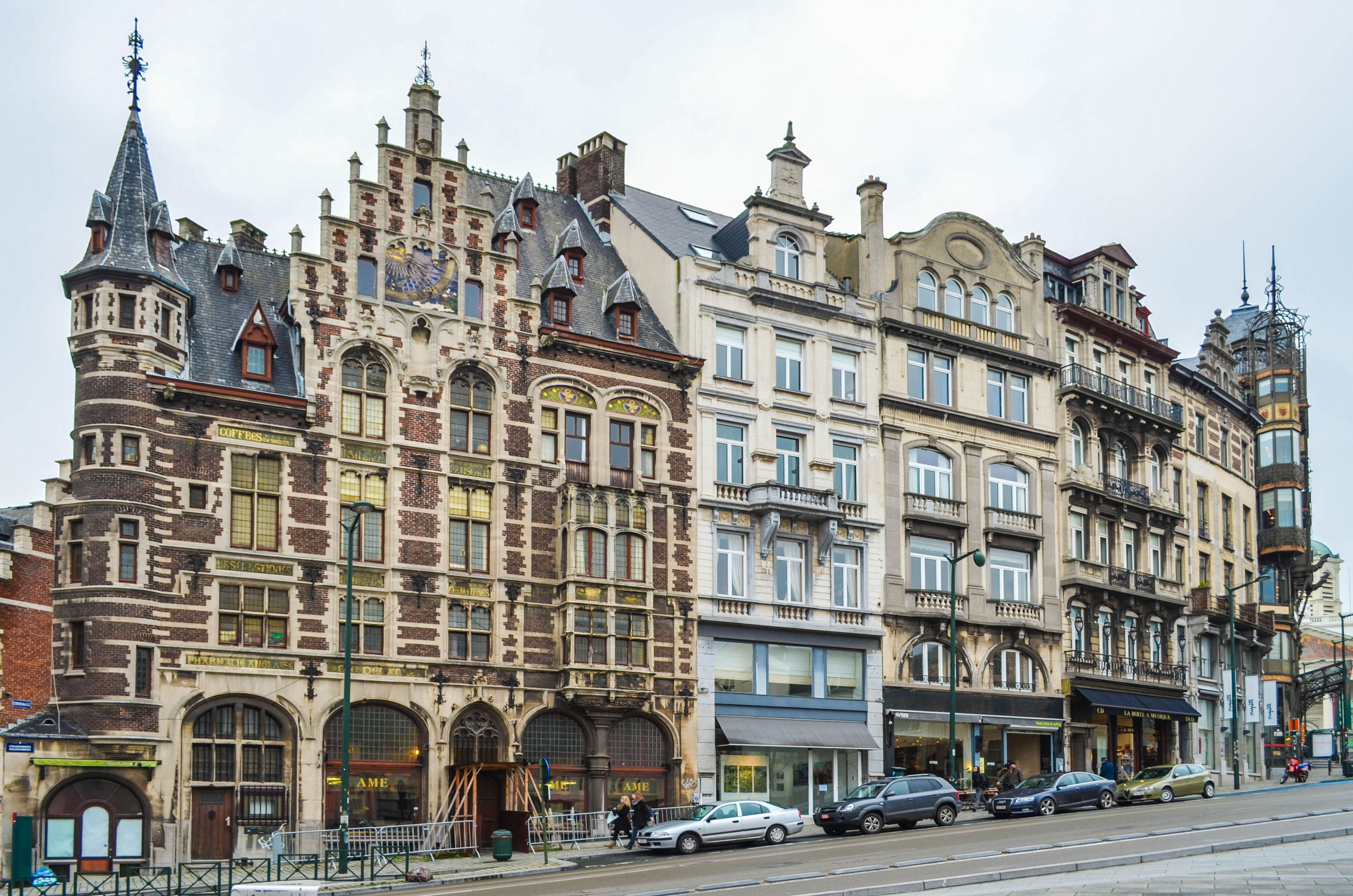
La Pharmacie Anglaise (left) with its neighbours

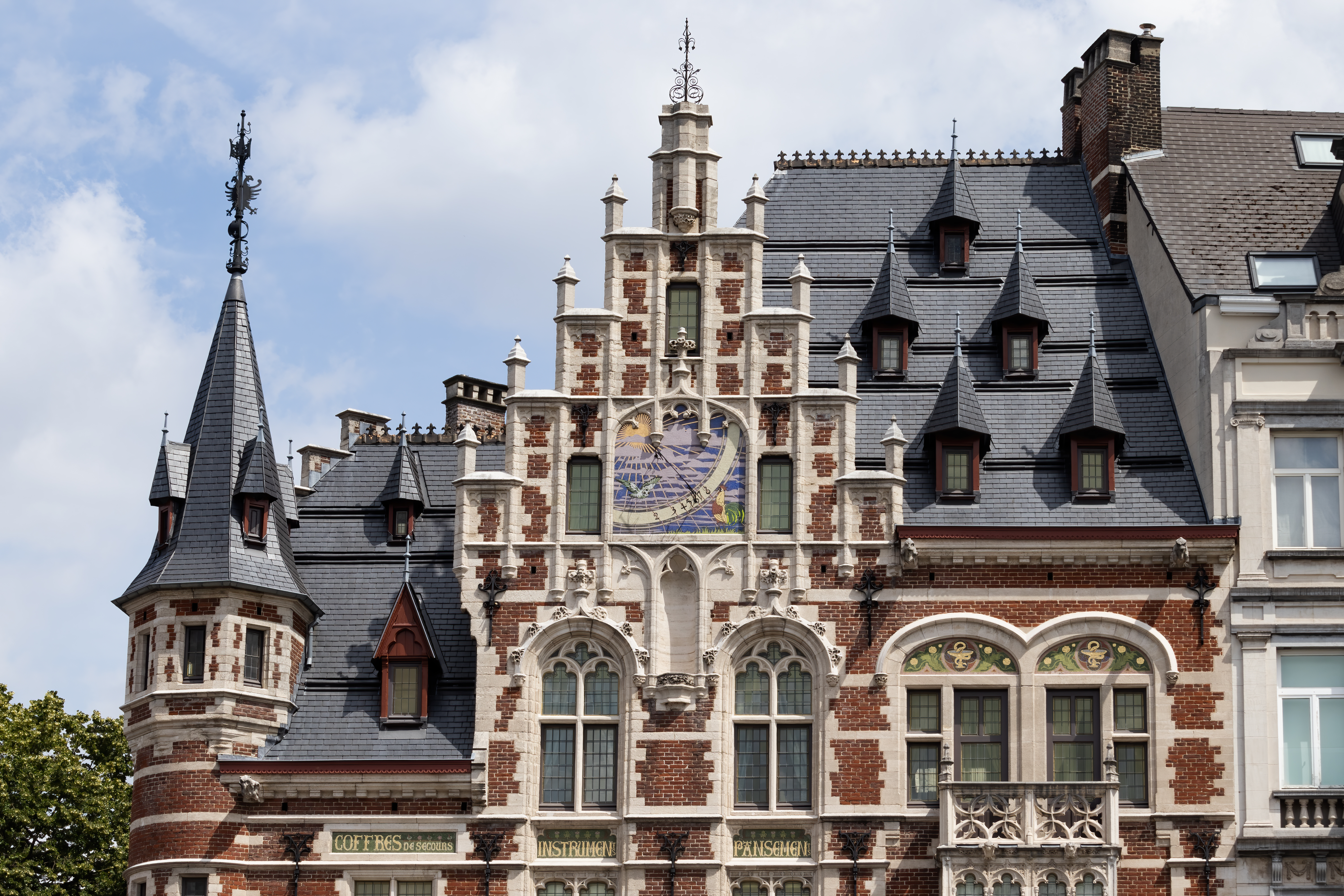
Closeup of the pediment and roofs

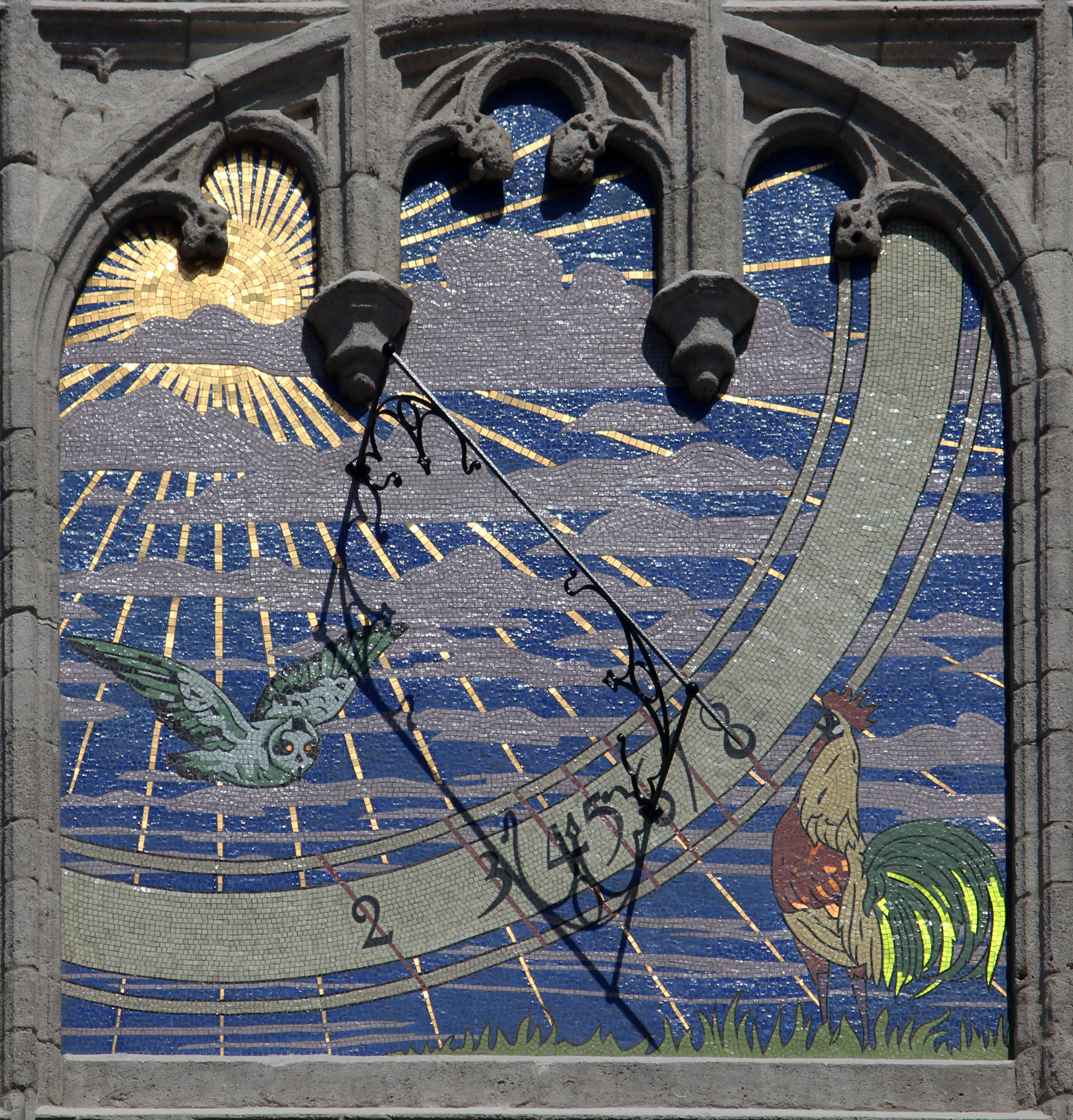
Sundial

=== Interior ===
The pharmacy preserves a distinctive neo-Flemish Renaissance interior, dated "Anno 1900", with oak panelling, a gallery, a beamed ceiling with carved corbels, and original furniture.

The warehouse interior is characterised by iron beams on columns and brick vaults. In 1928, the wooden staircase was replaced by a concrete one, and a central shaft with skylight was installed. Later modifications included the conversion of upper levels into apartments.

== See also ==
- Art Nouveau in Brussels
- History of Brussels
- Culture of Belgium
- Belgium in the long nineteenth century
