= The Whirling Ear =

Sculpture by Alexander Calder in Brussels, Belgium

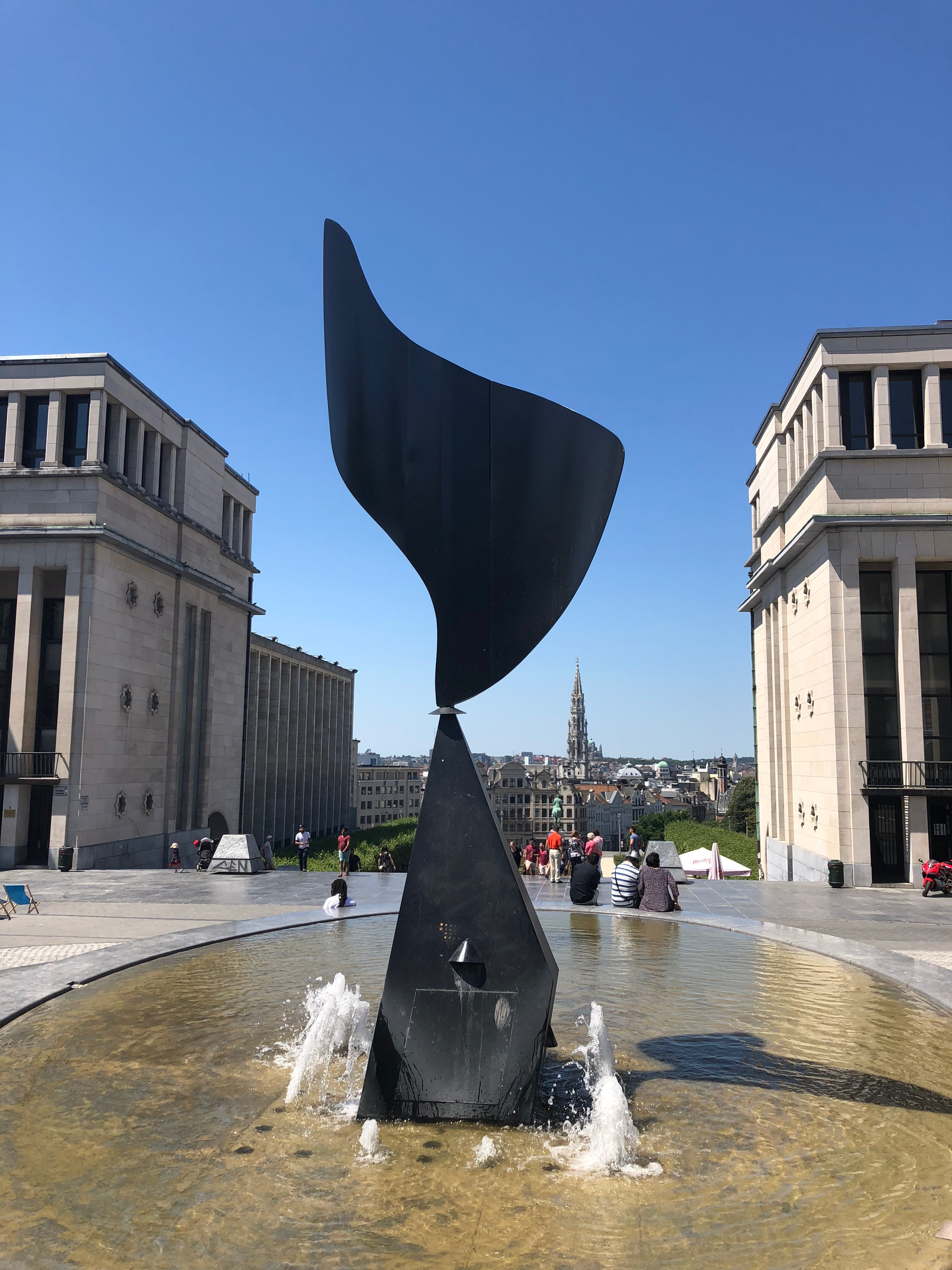
- Artist: Alexander Calder
- Year: 1958
- Location: Brussels, Belgium
- 50°50′35.286″N 4°21′29.192″E

The Whirling Ear is a 1958 sculpture by Alexander Calder, installed in Brussels. It was made using sheet metal and paint, with motor. The sculpture was commissioned.

== See also ==
- List of Alexander Calder public works
