= Square – Brussels Convention Centre =

Convention centre in Brussels, Belgium

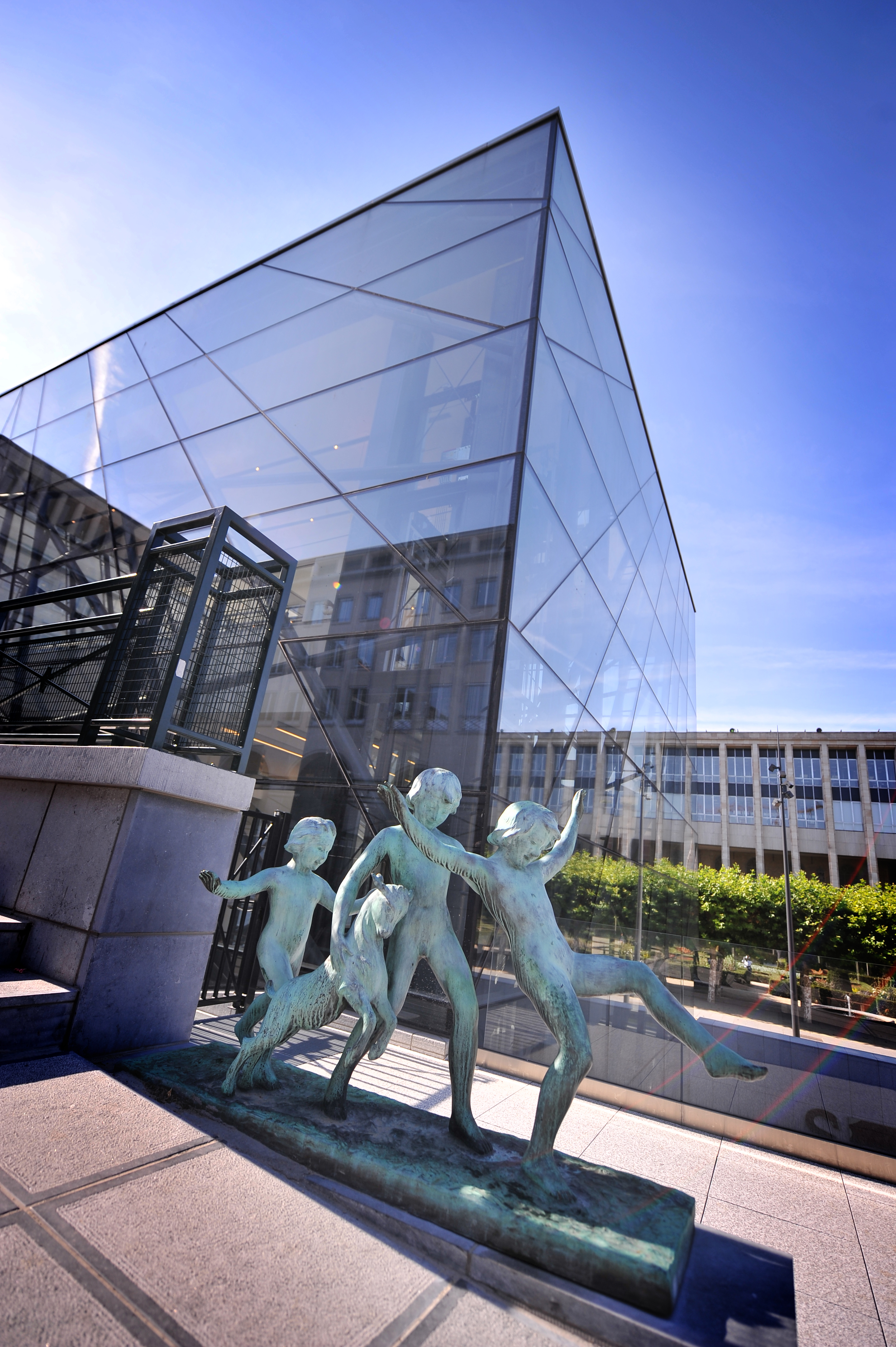
- Interactive map of Square – Brussels Convention Centre
- Location: Mont des Arts/Kunstberg, Brussels
- Coordinates: 50°50′38″N 4°21′27″E
- Owner: Palais des Congrès plc
- Operator: GL events

Construction
- Opened: 20 September 2009
- Cost: €70 million
- Architect: A.2R.C

Website
- square-brussels.com

Square – Brussels Convention Centre (previously Square – Brussels Meeting Centre) is a convention centre in Brussels, Belgium. It is run by the GL Events group and situated in cultural and historic district of Brussels near the national and international institutions, overlooking the city from the hillside of the Mont des Arts/Kunstberg.

== History ==
Square – Brussels Convention Centre is housed in the former Congress Palace, which was designed by Jules Ghobert and Maurice Houyoux and built for the 1958 Brussels World's Fair (Expo 58). Managed at the time by the National Congresses Service, the Congress Palace consisted of several subterranean spaces, including 1,200-seat and 300-seat auditoria, plus rudimentary exhibition spaces.

Although upgraded both technologically and aesthetically in 1978, the infrastructure of the Palace aged through the 1980s and 1990s. Several financial difficulties, together with the discovery of asbestos, eventually closed the Palace's doors in 2003.

In late 2004, the management of the centre was transferred to the newly created Palais des Congrès plc. By July 2005, the company's business and renovation plans were drawn up and approved, and funds were released. During two and half years, the Palace was thoroughly refurbished and expanded. The Palais des Congrès plc finalised an agreement for the management of Square with the GL events group.

Square – Brussels Meeting Centre opened its doors on 20 September 2009 with a public party.

== Today ==
Square – Brussels Convention Centre's landmark feature is the three-storey, 16-metre-tall (52 ft) glass cube that forms the main entry to the premises. The cube has a treelike structure and the overall aesthetic is based on transparency and light. A terrace leads to the upper access situated on the Mont des Arts.

Designed by Brussels architectural firm A.2R.C., Square – Brussels Meeting Centre has 27 meeting rooms of 40 to 1,200 for a total capacity of 7,000 attendees, and an exposition zone of 4,000 sqm. Its technological capacities have been updated: an integrated optic fiber infrastructure make web streaming possible anywhere in the venue, without undermining sound or image quality.

Works of art decorate the meeting centre's foyers. Many of the original features, including expansive murals by Paul Delvaux, René Magritte and Louis Van Lint have been restored and are juxtaposed with contemporary design conceived by a team of European designers: Portuguese artist Juan Trindade for the interior, Belgian designer Arne Quinze for the Kwint public restaurant and the Panoramic Hall, Atelier Roland Jéol for the lighting.

At the 2010 MIPIM, the real estate exhibition and conference, Square won the Special Jury Award.

== Main source ==
Hip to be SQUARE. Published by Palais des Congrès plc, Brussels, 2009
