= Iwan (Yitzhak) Salomon =

Dutch-Jewish philanthropist (1881–1972)

- Born: Iwan Salomon; March 1, 1881; Germany
- Died: January 1, 1972 (aged 90); New York City, United States
- Occupations: Tobacco merchant, communal leader
- Known for: Philanthropist, community leader, benefactor of Jewish education
- Title: Haver, חבר
- Spouse(s): Rachel Salomon; Sophie Wilhelmina Shifra Prins
- Children: 5

Iwan (Yitzhak) Salomon (1 March 1881 – 1 January 1972) was a German-born Dutch-Jewish philanthropist and communal leader. He was instrumental in supporting Jewish educational and religious institutions in Amsterdam and later in the United States. Salomon is remembered for his generosity, community involvement, and efforts to assist Jewish refugees during and after the Second World War.

== Biography ==
Iwan Salomon was born on 1 March 1881, in Löcknitz, Germany, into a family of tobacco merchants. Through his success in the tobacco trade, he built a substantial fortune and later settled in Amsterdam, where he became an active member of the Dutch Jewish community.

He was first married to Rachel Salomon, with whom he had three children. After Rachel’s death in 1918, (Note: Rachel Salomon (née Van Cleef) (July 4, 1887 – December 10, 1918), died at the age of 31 during the Spanish flu pandemic.) he married Sophie Wilhelmina Shifra Prins, daughter of Eliezer Liepman Philip Prins, a noted Dutch Jewish scholar and philanthropist. (Note: The artist Benjamin Prins, was her half-brother.) Together they had two children.

== Jewish community involvement ==
From 1921 to 1939, the Salomon family resided at Van Eeghenstraat 64 in Amsterdam. Salomon was known as a baal tsedaka (philanthropist) for Dutch Jews. His name was often mentioned when financial help was needed, and he served on numerous boards, including:

- The synagogue council of the Dutch Israelite Main Synagogue
- The synagogue’s financial committee
- The board of the NISSA (Dutch Jewish Congregation)

He played a leading role in funding and organizing the establishment of the Jewish HBS (Higher Secondary School) in Amsterdam, which later became known as the "Maimonides Lyceum".

In the 1930s, when German-Jewish refugees began arriving in the Netherlands, Salomon—himself of German origin—worked to help integrate them into the local kehilla (Jewish community). He also donated funds to refurbish the lounge in the Sisters’ House of the Dutch Israelite Hospital on Nieuwe Keizersgracht.

Following the outbreak of World War II, Salomon managed to emigrate with his family to Canada, seeking safe shores from Nazi-occupied Europe. During his time in Montreal, Salomon became active in the local Jewish community and played a key role in renovating the interior of the Spanish and Portuguese Synagogue, where Captain Sebag Montefiore served as president. (Note: In early 1939, they crossed the North Sea via England, arriving in Halifax, and continued by train for 24 hours to Montreal. Although the family had originally intended to settle in Toronto, the winter travel proved too difficult, and they decided to remain in Montreal.)

Later, after relocating to New York, Salomon continued his philanthropic and communal work. He assisted in establishing the Sephardic Studies Program at Yeshiva University, supporting initiatives that promoted the study and preservation of Sephardic heritage and culture within the broader Jewish academic framework.

== Later life ==
He eventually settled in New York City, where he joined the congregation of the Spanish and Portuguese Synagogue near Central Park.

After the Second World War, Salomon remained deeply concerned about the fate of Dutch Jewry. He corresponded with returning rabbis and financed efforts to rebuild Jewish communal life in Amsterdam. He also contributed to the Conference of European Rabbis to strengthen the post-war Orthodox Jewish communities.

In 1969, Salomon was honored with the title of Haver חבר by the Chief Rabbi of France, Rabbi Jacob Kaplan, in recognition of his lifelong dedication to Jewish causes.

== Death ==
Iwan Salomon died in 1972 in New York. His second wife, Sophie Wilhelmina Shifra Prins, died a year earlier, in 1971.

== Gallery ==
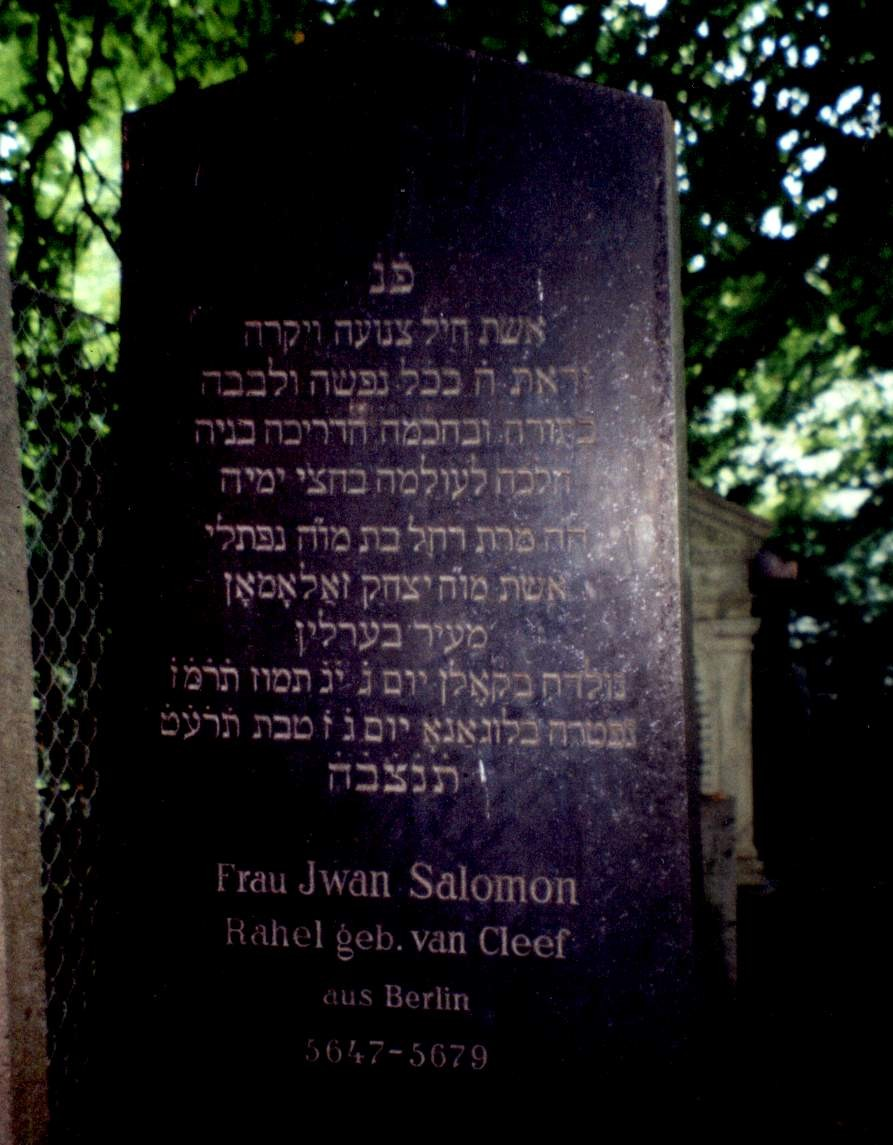
מצבת רחל (רחֵל) סולומון לבית ואן קליף, נפטרה 10 בדצמבר 1918
בית קברות בברלין
Tombstone of Rahel (Rachel) Salomon (née van Cleef), died 10 December 1918; Berlin cemetery.

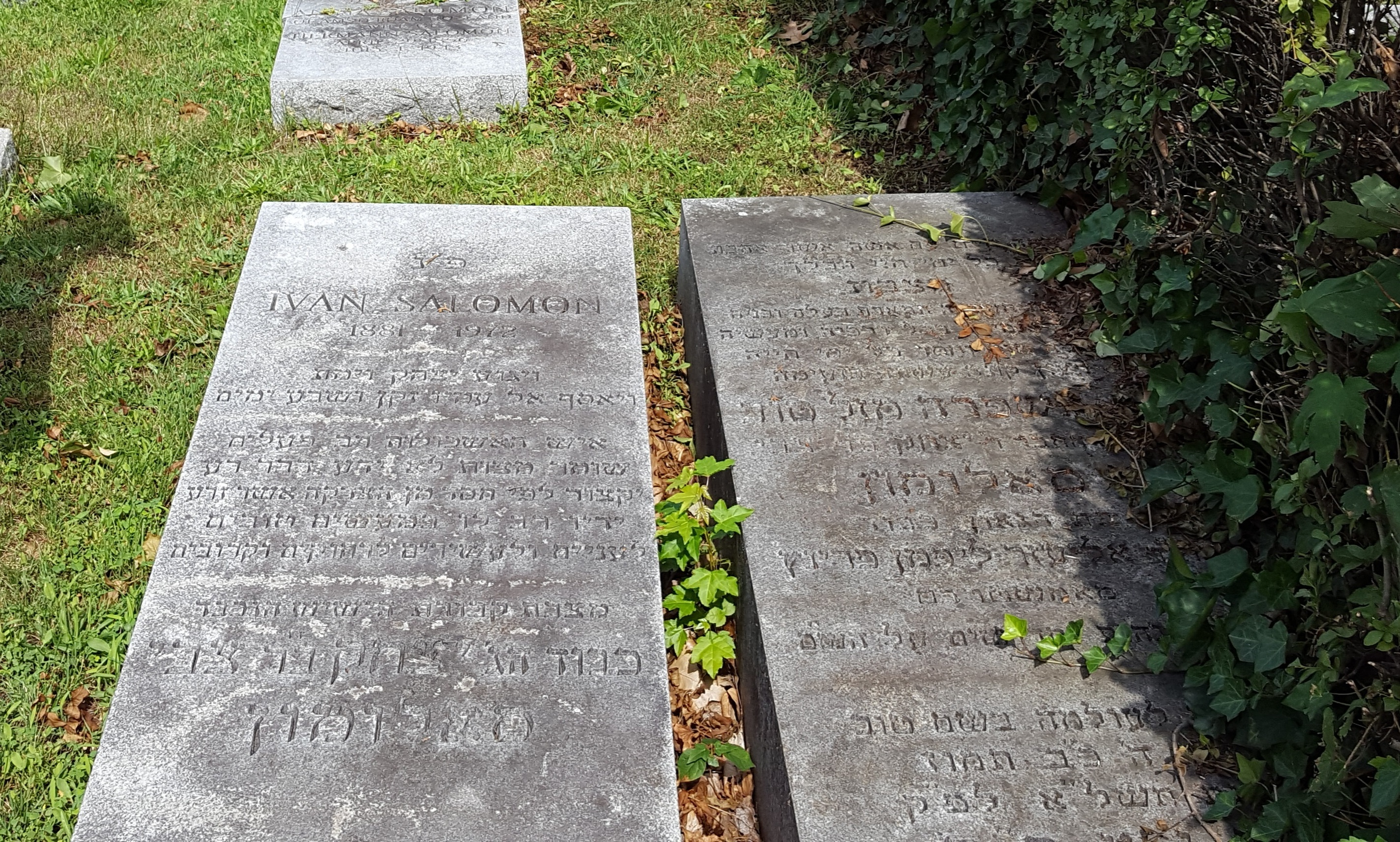
מצבות איוון (איוואן) סולומון וסופיה וילהלמינה שפירה סולומון לבית פרינס
איוון סולומון (1881–1972) • סופיה סולומון (1892–1971)
Gravestones of Iwan (Ivan) Salomon (1881–1972) and Sophie Wilhelmina Shifra Salomon (1892–1971).

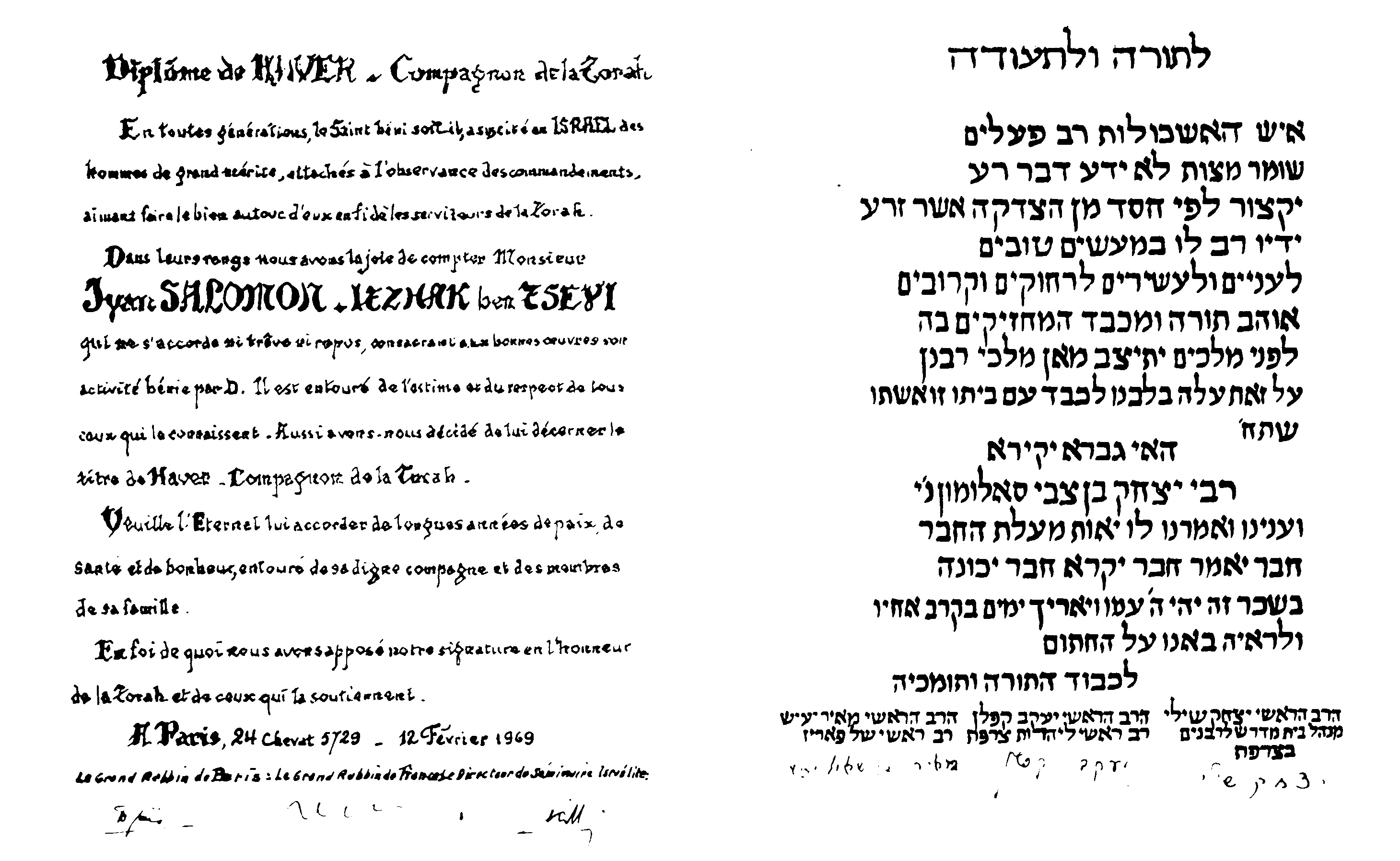
תעודת "חבר" מטעם הרבנות הראשית של צרפת
הוענקה לאיוון סולומון, פריז, 12 בפברואר 1969
Bilingual (Hebrew–French) certificate awarding the title “Haver” to Iwan Salomon, Paris, 12 February 1969.

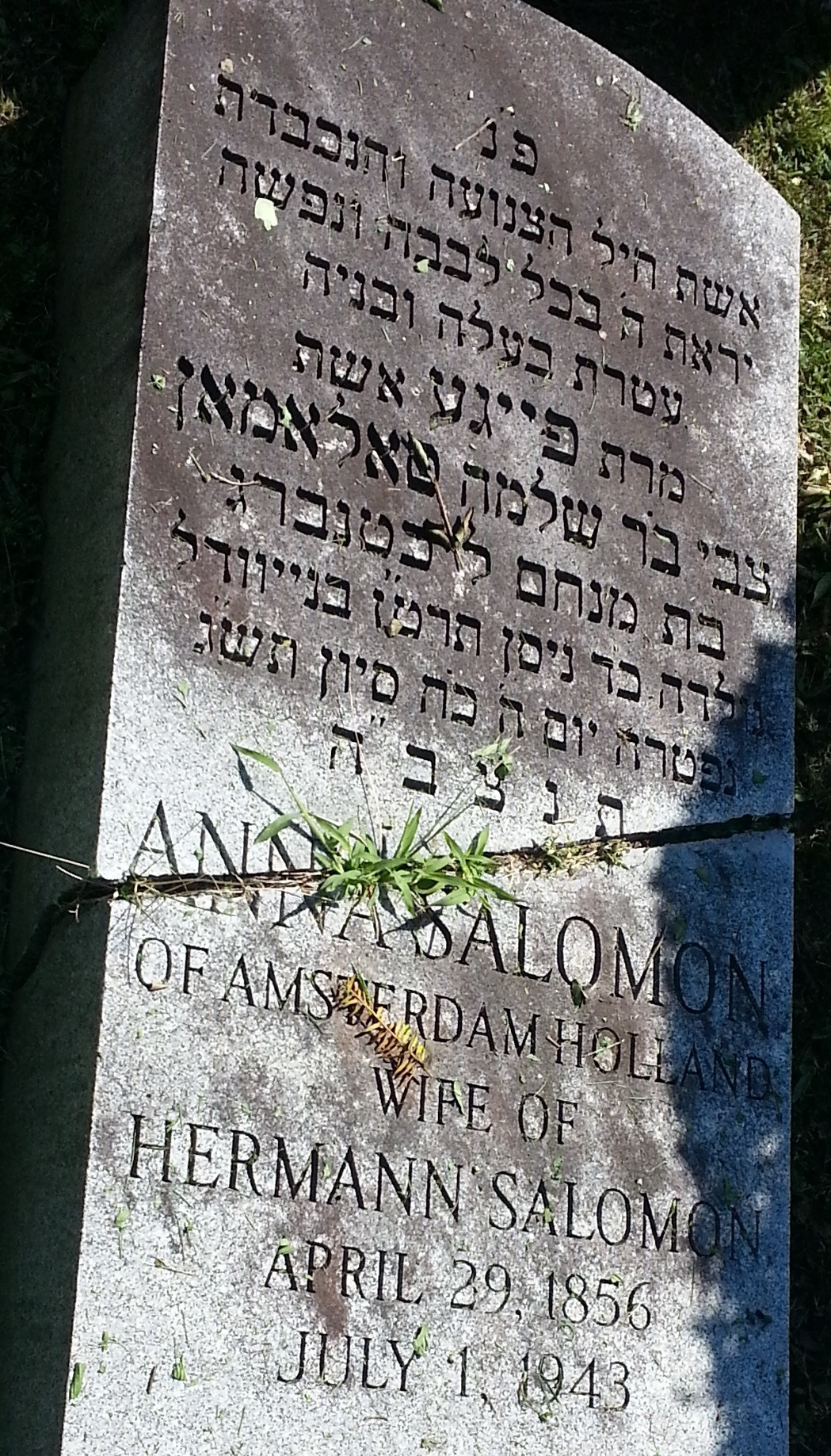
מצבת אנה סולומון לבית ליכטנברג (נולדה כ־1862 – נפטרה 1 ביולי 1949)
מצבה עם כתובות בעברית ובאנגלית; ניו יורק
Gravestone of Anna Salomon (née Lichtenberg), c.1862–1949; Hebrew and English inscriptions.

== See also ==
- Eliezer Liepman Philip Prins
- Maimonides Lyceum
- Els Bendheim
- Herman Prins Salomon

== Sources ==
- Nieuw Israëlietisch Weekblad, May 23, 1969.
- Amsterdam City Archives, Family Card.
- Schuster, A., "Iwan Salomon 90 years old", Nieuw Israëlietisch Weekblad, February 26, 1971.
- Nieuw Israëlietisch Weekblad, October 30, 1931 (Dutch Israelite Hospital).
