= Els Bendheim =

Dutch Orthodox Jewish leader (1923–2023)

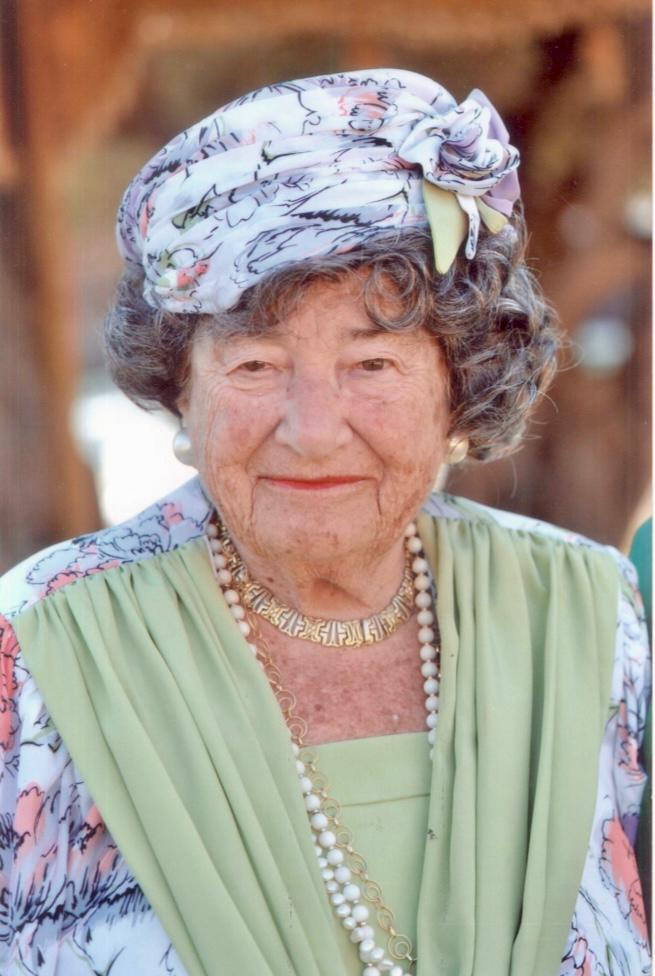

Personal life
- Born: Els (Rivka) Salomon-Prins Bendheim; 7 July 1923 Amsterdam, Netherlands
- Died: 12 January 2023 (aged 99) Jerusalem, Israel
- Spouse: Charles Henry Bendheim (1917-1997)
- Children: 7
- Education: Barnard College
- Occupation: Theologian; author; photographer

Religious life
- Religion: Judaism

Els Salomon-Prins Bendheim (7 July 1923 – 12 January 2023, 23 Tammuz 5683 – 20 Tevet 5783) was a Dutch-born Orthodox Jewish philanthropist, theologian, author and photographer. In 2002, Bendheim was awarded the Yakir Yerushalayim (Worthy Citizen of Jerusalem) prize for her contributions to the development of Jewish institutions in Jerusalem.

== Biography ==
Els (Rivka) Salomon-Prins was born in Amsterdam, daughter of Iwan (Yitzhak) Salomon and Sophie (Shifra) Wilhelmina Prins Salomon. Her grandfather was the Dutch merchant and Jewish scholar Eliezer Liepman Philip Prins. Her brother was the linguist Herman Prins Salomon. Her half siblings were Robert Salomon, Erna Steindecker and Theodore Salomon. Els Bendheim grew up in Amsterdam and attended the Amsterdams Lyceum.

In 1939, after Hitler's rise to power, the family fled to Canada. They settled in Montreal, where Bendheim attended Westmount High School. In 1944, she graduated from Barnard College with a B.Sc. in Chemistry.

In 1957, Bendheim graduated from the New York School of Interior Design and continued to engage in photography and design throughout her life. Although forced to give up her Dutch citizenship after becoming an American, she considered herself Dutch and visited the Netherlands often. She later exhibited her photographs of tulips and Dutch landscapes on the walls of Shaare Zedek Medical Center.

Bendheim was married to Charles Henry Bendheim, with whom she had seven children.

She died in Jerusalem on 12 January 2023, at the age of 99.

== Literary and scholarly career ==
Bendheim published extensively in English, Hebrew and Dutch on topics of theology, rabbinic writings and European Jewish history. Inheriting a love for Jewish literature, she initiated the publication of her grandfather's correspondences, the notes he left in the margins of his books and an anthology of his work in Dutch.

One of Bendheim's halakhic position papers led to the establishment of the Manhattan Eruv in 1962. Bendheim stressed the importance of community and inclusiveness in Jewish rulings, arguing that Orthodox Jews who used wheelchairs and young mothers with infants could not attend synagogue on the Sabbath without an eruv.

Another project was a book of blessings entitled "Pereḳ Shirah" dedicated to President Chaim and Aura Herzog and later republished for subsequent presidents including their son, President Isaac Herzog.

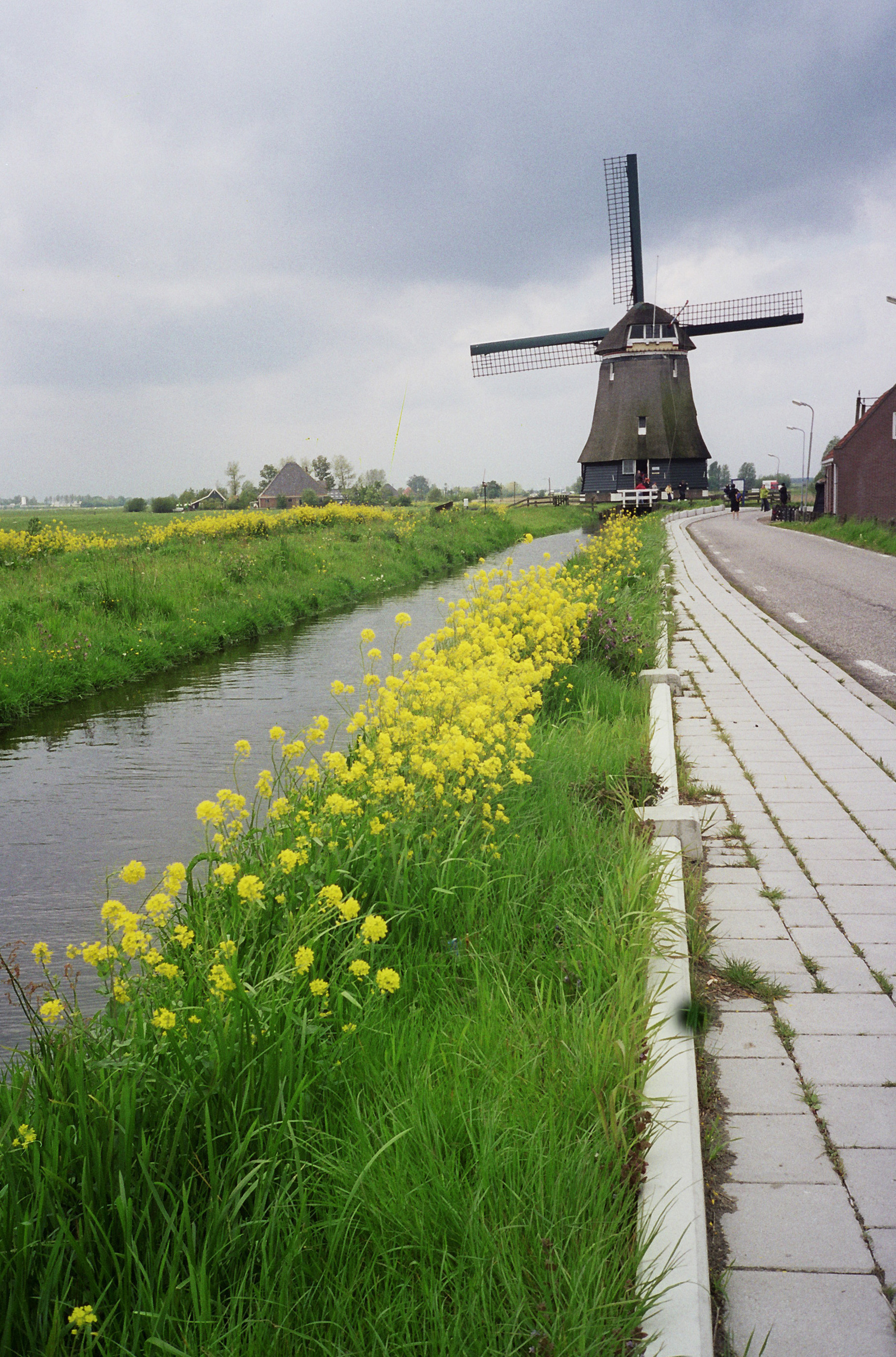
Edam-Zuidpolder windmill with flowers, 2008, photograph by Els Bendheim

== Philanthropic activities ==
In 1976, Bendheim and her husband worked with Uri Lupolianski to establish Friends of Yad Sarah Association in the United States. Her dedication to this project continued over forty years. Her son, Philip Bendheim, serves on the board and coordinates the activities of the Friends of Yad Sarah Associations in the United States and Europe. Bendheim was involved in establishing and upkeeping the Shaare Zedek Medical Center, and was among the founding members of Manhattan Day School, Stern College for Women and Yeshiva University. Bendheim was also a generous donor to the Jerusalem College of Technology and the Jewish Institute for the Blind.

== Awards and recognition ==
- Els Salomon-Prins Bendheim received the Yakir Yerushalayim Prize in 2002.

== Published and edited works ==
- Memoirs of Childhood: An approach to Jewish philosophy Nima H. Adlerblum, ed. Els Bendheim
- Pereḳ Shirah: osef pesuḳim ṿe-ḳiṭʻe tefilah, 1986 (Hebrew)
- The Manhattan Eruv: From the Writings of Rav Menachem M. Kasher, ed. Els Bendheim (Ktav Publishing House, 1986). ISBN 9780881251104
- Parnas le-dorot : Hagahot u-maʼamarot, Liepman Philip Prins, 1999/2001 (Hebrew and English)
- The Synagogue Within : Antwerpen's Eisenmann Schul
- The Lesson of Amalek : A teaching guide Mayer Herskovics, ed. Els Bendheim, 1990/2007 (English and Hebrew)
- Flowers for You: From Shaare Zedek Medical Center Shaare Zedek Medical Center, Jerusalem (English)
- Neʻimot Elef : Catalogue of Hebrew books in the library of Eliezer Lipman Prinz, Amsterdam, now held in the Mizraḥi Teachers ̀seminary in Jerusalem, Judah Leyb Polak, ed. Els Bendheim, 1990 (Hebrew)
- Parnas le-doro : Hitkatvut Eliʻezer Liepman , 1992 (Hebrew)
- Neʻimot Elef, 1992 (Hebrew)
- Liepman Philip Prins: His Scholarly Correspondence, Meyer Herskovics and Els Bendheim eds.(New Jersey: Ktav, 1992)
- Letter dated 3 Nissan 5660 (1900) from the Chafetz Chaim to R. Eliezer Liepman Philip Prins, Israel Meir, 1993 (Hebrew)
- Eliezer Liepman Philip Prins Family Tree, New York, Ezra, 1993
- Eisenmann Synagogue, Vignettes, founded 5668-1908 by Jacob [Yaʻaḳov ha-Leṿi] Jacques S. Eisenmann, Oostenstraat 41, Antwerpen, België, 1998 (English)
- Rededication of the "Eisenmann Sjoel", founded 5668-1908 by [Yaʻaḳov ha-Leṿi] Jacques S. Eisenmann : Oostenstraat 41, Antwerpen, België, 1998 (English)
- Qehilat Yaʻaqov: The Eisenmann Schul: Vignettes, 1998 (English)
- Commentaries of Rabbi Simon Hammelburg on Seder Nashim, edited and translated from Dutch, Els Bendheim
- Eliʻezer Lipman Prinz̲: Parnas ledorot : Hagahot u-maʼamrot, Liepman Philip Prins, 1999 (Hebrew)
- Pereḳ shirah : Shirim zemirot u-verakhot, 2000 (Hebrew)
- Aantekeningen in de marge : Liepman Philip Prins : een Ansterdamse geleerde uit de Mediene, Liepman Philip Prins, 2001 (Dutch)
- Charlie Reminisces, 2002 eds. Noam Eisenberg and Els Bendheim (English)
- Els Reminisces, 2003 (English)
- The Synagogue Within, Antwerpen's Eisenmann Schul, 2004
