= Eisenmann Synagogue =

Synagogue in Antwerp, Belgium

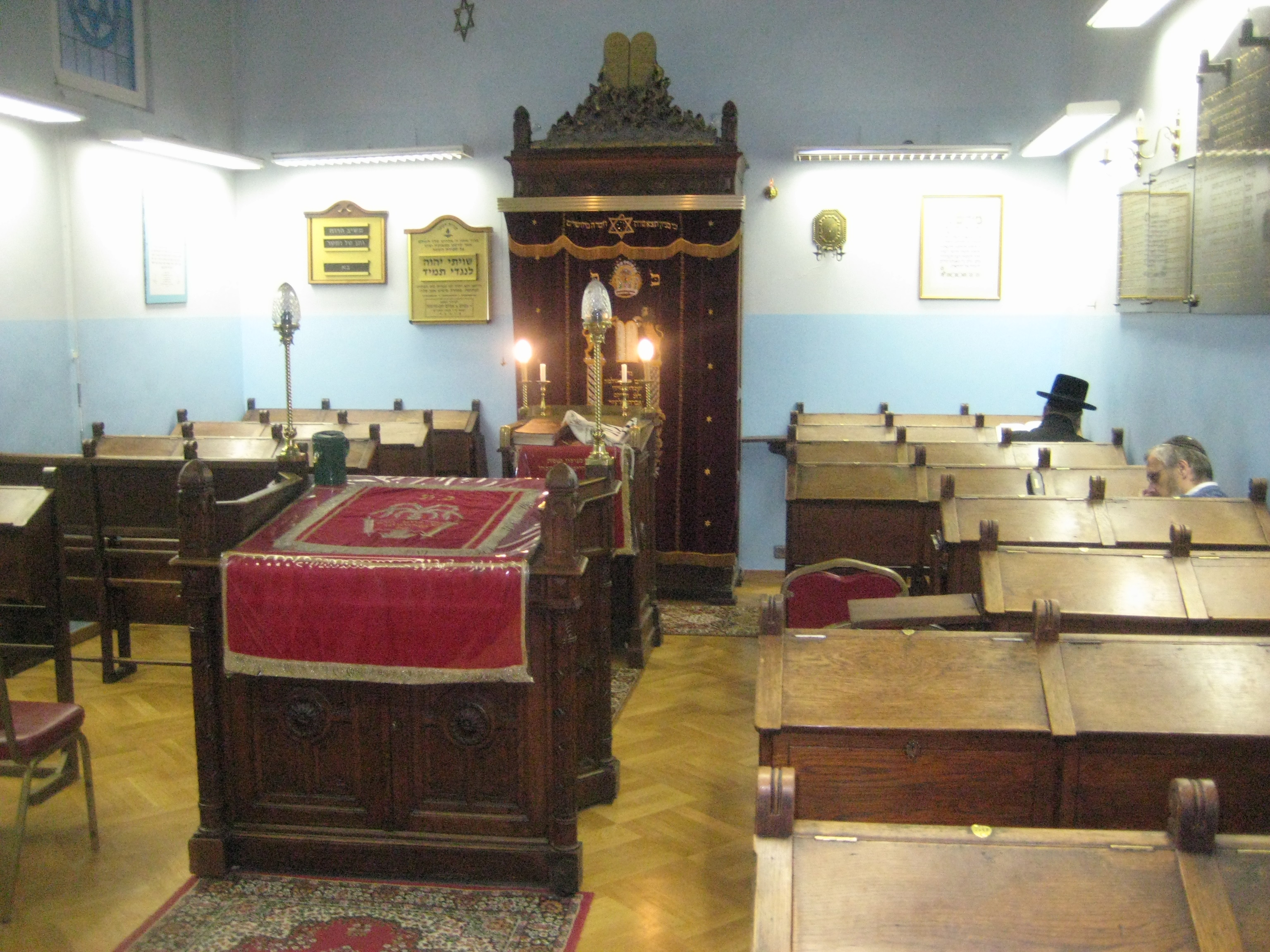
- Interior of the synagogue in 2011

- Location of the synagogue in Belgium

Religion
- Affiliation: Orthodox Judaism
- Rite: Nusach Ashkenaz
- Ecclesiastical or organizational status: Synagogue
- Status: Active

Location
- Location: 30 Oostenstraat, Antwerp
- Country: Belgium
- Interactive map of Eisenmann Synagogue
- Coordinates: 51°12′29″N 4°25′29″E

Architecture
- Architect: Joseph De Lange
- Type: Synagogue architecture
- Founder: Jacob Eisenmann
- Established: 1905 (as a congregation)
- Completed: 1909
- Materials: Brick

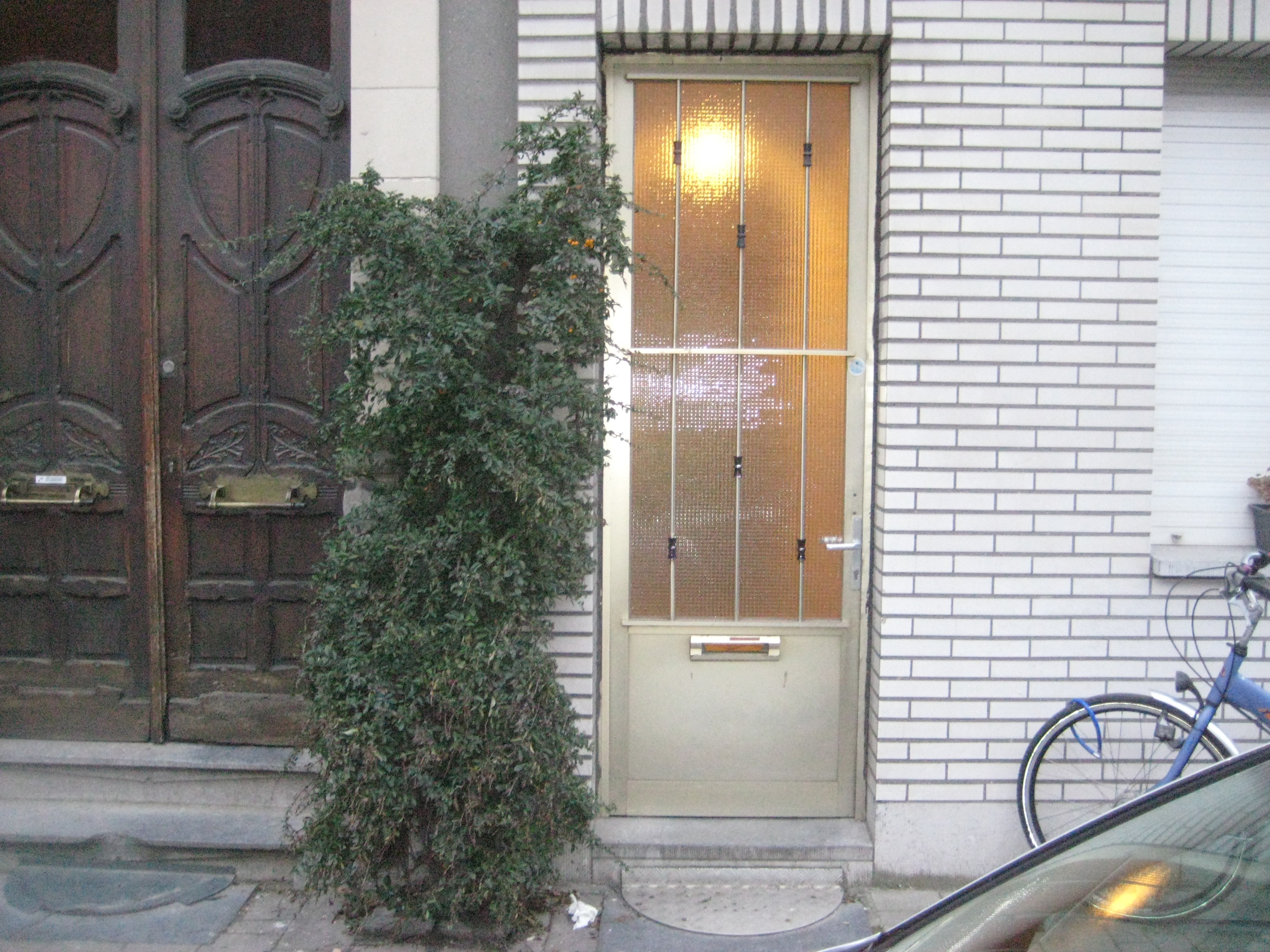
Exterior of Eisenmann Synagogue

The Eisenmann Synagogue is an Orthodox Jewish congregation and synagogue, located at 30 Oostenstraat, in Antwerp, Belgium. Established as a congregation by Jacob Eisenmann in 1905 the synagogue was completed in 1907. It is the only synagogue in Antwerp to have survived the Holocaust and the Nazi occupation of Belgium. The congregation worships in the Ashkenazi rite.

== History ==
=== Jacob Eisenmann ===
Jacob (Jacques) Samuel Eisenmann was born in Frankfurt am Main. In 1884 he moved to Antwerp, where he established a company in the import of dried fruits and industrial fibers from the Belgian Congo. He was a very successful businessman and reputed to have been close with King Leopold II. His wife was the daughter of Eliezer Liepman Philip Prins and his brother-in-law was the noted painter Benjamin Prins. Eisenmann was extremely well versed in both Jewish and general topics. He was a student of Rabbi Samson Raphael Hirsch, under whom Eisenmann had studied in Frankfurt.

=== Founding of the Minyan ===
The tradition of the Jewish community in his native Frankfurt was close to his heart, and he was annoyed at the way of life of Eastern European immigrants brought to Antwerp. Specifically the lack of decorum during the tefillot and conversation during prayers that perturbed him. As a result, he decided to start his own minyan, one which the traditions of the Jewish community in Frankfurt, would be kept. In 1905 he rented three rooms in the Breughelstraat. In the beginning there were approximately twenty members of his minyan, but soon, the number of worshipers burgeoned and it became quite clear that a new space was necessary. As a result, Eisenmann decided to purchase a piece of land on Oostenstraat across the street from the railroad embankment.

=== Synagogue design ===
In 1908 Eisenmann bought two adjoining buildings, and built the synagogue to stretch through the interior of both. The façades of the buildings were not to be recognizable as a Jewish synagogue or Shul. This stealth was a crucial factor in the survival of the synagogue during the Second World War. Eisenmann chose Joseph De Lange as the architect, who had recently graduated from the Royal Academy of Fine Arts. The synagogue was completed in 1909.

=== Recent history ===
Els Bendheim, a niece of Eisenmann, edited a book about the history and significance of the synagogue, that was published by KTAV Publishing House in 2004.

In 2009 a group of over 200 descendants of Eisenmann, including the synagogue's primary benefactor, Jack Lunzer, gathered in Antwerp to celebrate and commemorate the 100th anniversary of the synagogue's founding.

== See also ==
- The Holocaust in Belgium
- History of the Jews in Belgium
- History of Antwerp
