= Uriel da Costa =

Early 17th century Portuguese-Jewish philosopher

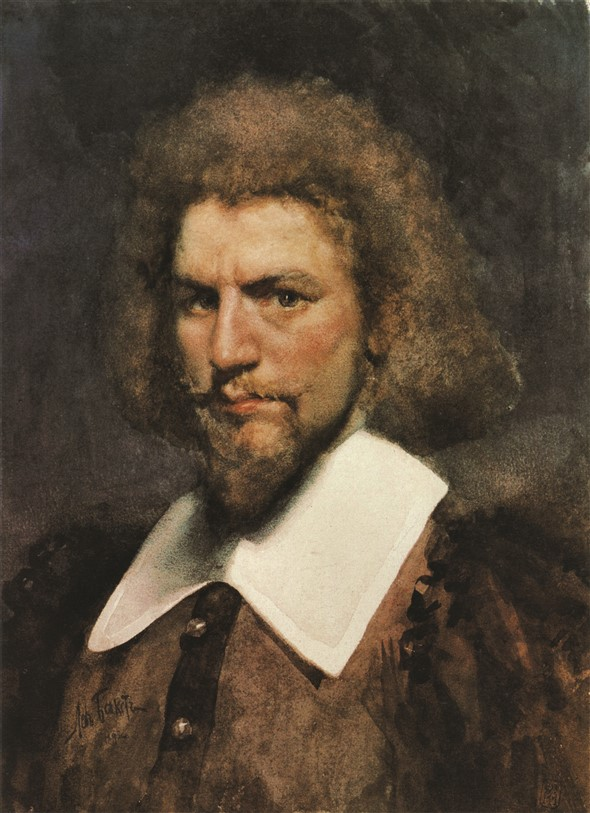
- Imaginary 1897 portrait by Léon Bakst
- Born: Gabriel Fiuza da Costa; 1585; Porto, Kingdom of Portugal
- Died: 1640 C. Amsterdam, Dutch Republic

Education
- Education: Universidade de Coimbra, Faculty of Law (BA, June 1608)

Philosophical work
- Era: 17th century Philosophy
- Region: Western philosophy
- Institutions: University of Coimbra
- Main interests: Biblical Criticism, Criticism of Judaism, Philosophy of Religion, ethics, morality

Signature
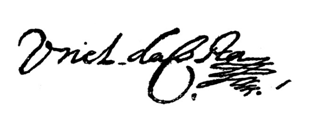

Uriel da Costa (Portuguese: [uɾiˈɛl dɐ ˈkɔʃtɐ]; also Acosta or d'Acosta; c. 1585 – April 1640) was a Portuguese Sephardi philosopher who was born a New Christian but returned to Judaism, whereupon he questioned the Catholic and rabbinic orthodoxies of his time. This led him into conflict with both Christian and Jewish institutions: his books were placed on the Index Librorum Prohibitorum and several Jewish authorities excommunicated him. His iconoclastic life culminated in suicide in c. 1640.

== Life ==
His short autobiography contains many details about his life, but over the past two centuries, documents uncovered in Portugal, Amsterdam, Hamburg, and elsewhere have added much to the picture.

Da Costa was born Gabriel Fiuza da Costa in Porto. His ancestors were Cristãos-novos (New Christians)—Jews forcibly converted to Catholicism by state edict in 1497. His father, Bento da Costa, was a well-off international merchant and tax-farmer. His mother, Branca, "seems to have been a Judaizer" (i.e., a false convert to Christianity), according to Nadler.

Studying Catholic canon law at the University of Coimbra intermittently between 1600 and 1608, he began to read the Hebrew Bible and contemplate it seriously. Da Costa also held a benefice, an ecclesiastical office, in the Catholic Church. In his autobiography, da Costa depicted his family as devout Catholics. However, they had been subject to several investigations by the Portuguese Inquisition, suggesting they were crypto-Jews, more or less observing Jewish customs. Da Costa explicitly supported adherence to Mosaic law.

After his father died, the da Costa family fell into financial difficulty due to unpaid debts. In 1614, they escaped their predicament by leaving Portugal with a significant sum previously collected as tax farmers for Jorge de Mascarenhas. The family branched off, settling among two major Sephardic diaspora communities. Newly circumcised and with new Jewish names, two brothers migrated to Amsterdam, while two others went with their mother to Hamburg. Da Costa was among the Hamburg group, going by Uriel among his Jewish neighbours and using the alias Adam Romez for outside relations, presumably because he was wanted in Portugal. All resumed their international trade business. Upon arriving in Hamburg, da Costa quickly became disenchanted with the kind of Judaism he saw in practice. He came to believe that the rabbinic leadership was obsessed with ritualism and legal posturing. At this time, he composed his earliest known written work, Propostas contra a Tradição (Propositions against the Tradition). In eleven short theses he called into question the disparity between Jewish customs and a literal reading of the Torah, and more generally tried to prove from reason and scripture that this system of law is sufficient.

In 1616, the text was dispatched to the leaders of the prominent Jewish community in Venice. The Venetian rabbinic council ruled against it, prompting the Hamburg community to sanction da Costa with a herem, or excommunication. The Propositions are extant only as quotes and paraphrases in Shield and Buckler (nonr: מגן וצנה), a lengthy rebuttal by Leon of Modena, written in response to religious queries about da Costa posed by the Hamburg Jewish authorities. (Note: Leone of Modena later published a developed iconoclastic treatise of his own ("kol sakhal / shaagat arye"), and it is quite possible that da Costa's doubts had some influence on him. Salomon & Sassoon, introduction to da Costa's Examination of Pharisaic Traditions, 1993, pp. 24–29.)

Da Costa's early work thus resulted in official excommunication in Venice and Hamburg; it is not known what effect this had on his life. He barely mentioned it in his autobiography and continued his international business. In 1623, he moved to Amsterdam for unknown reasons. The leaders of the Amsterdam Sephardic community, troubled by the arrival of a known heretic, staged a hearing and sanctioned the excommunication previously set in place against da Costa.

At about the same time (in Hamburg or Amsterdam), da Costa was working on a second treatise. Three chapters of this unpublished manuscript were stolen and formed the target for a traditionalist rebuttal published by Semuel da Silva of Hamburg. Da Costa enlarged his book further, with the printed version containing responses to da Silva and revisions to the crux of his argument.

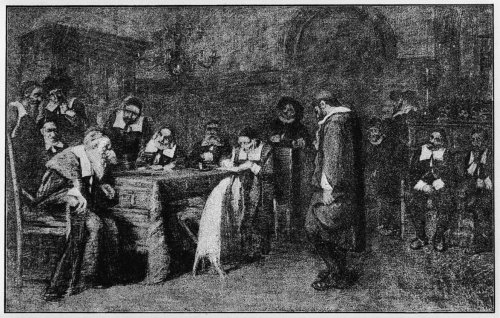
Uriel da Costa's excommunication (1888) by Meijer de Haan took 8 years of work, created a huge backlash, and disappeared shortly after, and is still not extant.

In 1623, da Costa published this book under the title of Exame das tradições phariseas (Examination of Pharisaic Traditions) in Portuguese. The complete printed book was discovered in 1990 at the Danish Royal Library by H. P. Salomon; previously, only three chapters had been known. The work runs to over 200 pages and is divided into two parts. In the first part, da Costa develops his earlier Propositions, considering Modena's responses and corrections. In the second part, he adds novel views that the Hebrew Bible, especially the Torah, does not support the idea of immortality of the soul. Da Costa believed that this was not an idea deeply rooted in biblical Judaism but rather had been formulated primarily by the Pharisees and was a late addition to the Jewish principles of faith. The work also pointed to supposed discrepancies between biblical Judaism and Rabbinic Judaism. He declared the latter an accumulation of mechanical ceremonies and ritual practices. He believed it was thoroughly devoid of spiritual and philosophical concepts. Da Costa was relatively early in arguing before a Jewish readership in favour of the mortality of the soul, and in appealing exclusively to direct reading of the bible. He cites neither rabbinic authorities nor philosophers of the Aristotelian and Neoplatonic traditions.

The book sparked a controversy among Jews in Amsterdam, whose leaders reported to the (Christian) city authorities that this was an attack on Christianity as well as on Judaism. The work was burned publicly, and da Costa was fined a significant sum. By 1627, da Costa was a denizen of Utrecht, though the Amsterdam community still had an acrimonious relationship with him. For example, they asked a Venetian rabbi, Yaakov Ha-Levi, whether da Costa's elderly mother was eligible for a burial plot in the Jewish cemetery. The following year, da Costa's mother died, and he went back to Amsterdam. Ultimately, the loneliness was too much for him to handle. Around 1633, he accepted the terms of reconciliation with the Jewish authorities, which he does not detail in his autobiography. He was thus reaccepted into the Jewish community.

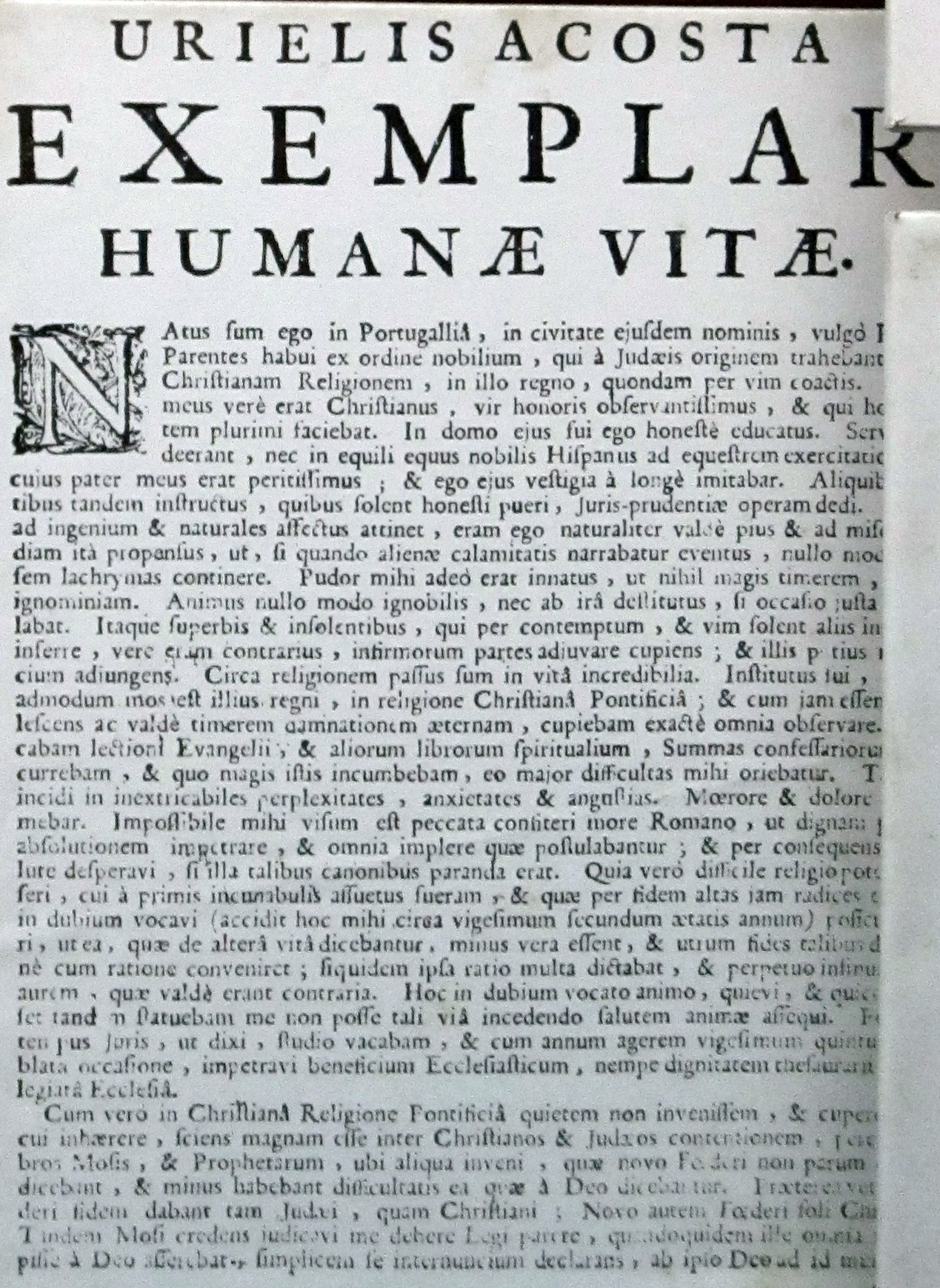
Exemplar Humanae Vitae, by Uriel Acosta.

Shortly after, da Costa was tried again; he encountered two Christians who expressed to him their desire to convert to Judaism; he dissuaded them from doing so. Based on this and earlier accusations regarding kashrut violations, he was excommunicated again. As he describes it, for seven years, he lived in virtual isolation, shunned by his family and embroiled in civil-financial disputes with them. In search of legal help, he returned to being "an ape amongst the apes"; he would follow established Jewish traditions and practices but with little real conviction. Seeking reconciliation, he first suffered punishment for his heretical views: he was publicly given 39 lashes at the Portuguese synagogue in Amsterdam, then forced to lie on the floor while the congregation trampled over him. This ordeal left him both demoralized and thirsty for revenge against the man (a cousin or nephew) who initiated his trial seven years previously and marked the final dramatic point of his autobiography.

In a document entitled Exemplar Humanae Vitae (Example of a Human Life), da Costa tells the story of his life, intellectual development, and experiences as a victim of intolerance. Transmitted to print in Latin some decades after his death and only a few pages long, it also expresses rationalistic and sceptical views, including doubts about whether biblical law was divinely sanctioned or whether Moses simply wrote it down. Da Costa suggests that all religion is a human invention, and specifically rejects formalized, ritualized religion. He further sketches an idealized religion to be based only on natural law, as God has no use for empty ceremony, nor for violence and strife.

=== Suicide ===
Two reports agree that da Costa committed suicide in Amsterdam in 1640: Johannes Müller, a Protestant theologian of Hamburg gives the time as April, and Amsterdam Remonstrant preacher Philipp van Limborch adds that he set out to end the lives of both his brother (or nephew) and himself. Seeing his relative approach one day, he grabbed a pistol and pulled the trigger, but it misfired. Then he reached for another, turned it on himself, and fired, dying a reportedly terrible death.

== Influence ==
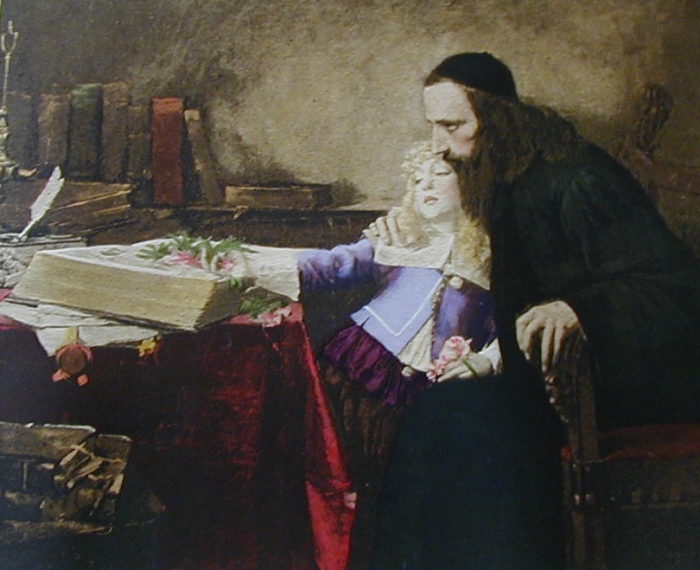
Imagined portrait of da Costa instructing the young Baruch Spinoza, by Samuel Hirszenberg (1901)

English translation of Da Costa's Examination of Pharisaic Traditions

In his lifetime, Examination inspired not only da Silva's answer, but also Menasseh ben Israel's more lasting De Resurrectione Mortuorum (1636) directed against the "Sadducees", and a listing in the Index of Prohibited Books.

After his death, da Costa's name became synonymous with the Exemplar Humanae Vitae. Müller publicized da Costa's excommunication, to make an anachronistic point that some Sephardic Jews of his days were Sadducees. Johann Helwig Willemer made the same point, and implied that this extreme heresy leads to suicide. Pierre Bayle reported the contents of the Exemplar quite fully, to demonstrate among other things that questioning religion without turning to revelation would bring one to miserable faithlessness.

The later Enlightenment saw da Costa's rational religion more tolerantly. Herder eulogized him as a crusader of authentic belief. Voltaire noted that he left Judaism for philosophy. Reimarus embraced da Costa's appeal to have legal status based on the Seven Laws of Noah, when he made an analogous argument that Christian states should be at least as tolerant toward modern Deists as ancient Israelites had been.

Internally to Judaism, da Costa has been regarded variously as a heretic or as a martyr against the intolerance of the Rabbinic establishment. He has also been seen as a precursor to Baruch Spinoza and to modern biblical criticism. Da Costa had a connection to the Spinoza family through Baruch's mother, Hanna, with both families coming from Porto, in northern Portugal, and might have known each other there. The Spinozas would have known of da Costa in the Jewish community of Amsterdam, of his troubles with the authorities, and his suicide. There is a 1901 imagined portrait of da Costa and the young Spinoza, but a Spinoza biographer, Steven Nadler describes the painting as "overwrought" and its depiction of Spinoza being instructed by da Costa as "pure fantasy." Spinoza was just eight years old when da Costa committed suicide, and he might not have known then about his family's connection to him. However, as an adolescent, he likely learned the details of the public and family scandal.

Da Costa is also indicative of the difficulties faced by many New Christians seeking to return to their ancestral Jewish roots upon arriving in an organized Jewish community. As a Crypto-Jew in Iberia, he read the Bible and was impressed by it. Yet upon confronting an organized rabbinic community, he was not equally impressed by the established ritual and religious doctrine of Rabbinical Judaism, such as the Oral Law. As da Costa himself pointed out, traditional Pharisee and Rabbinic doctrine had been contested in the past by the Sadducees and the Karaites, respectively.

== Works based upon da Costa's life ==
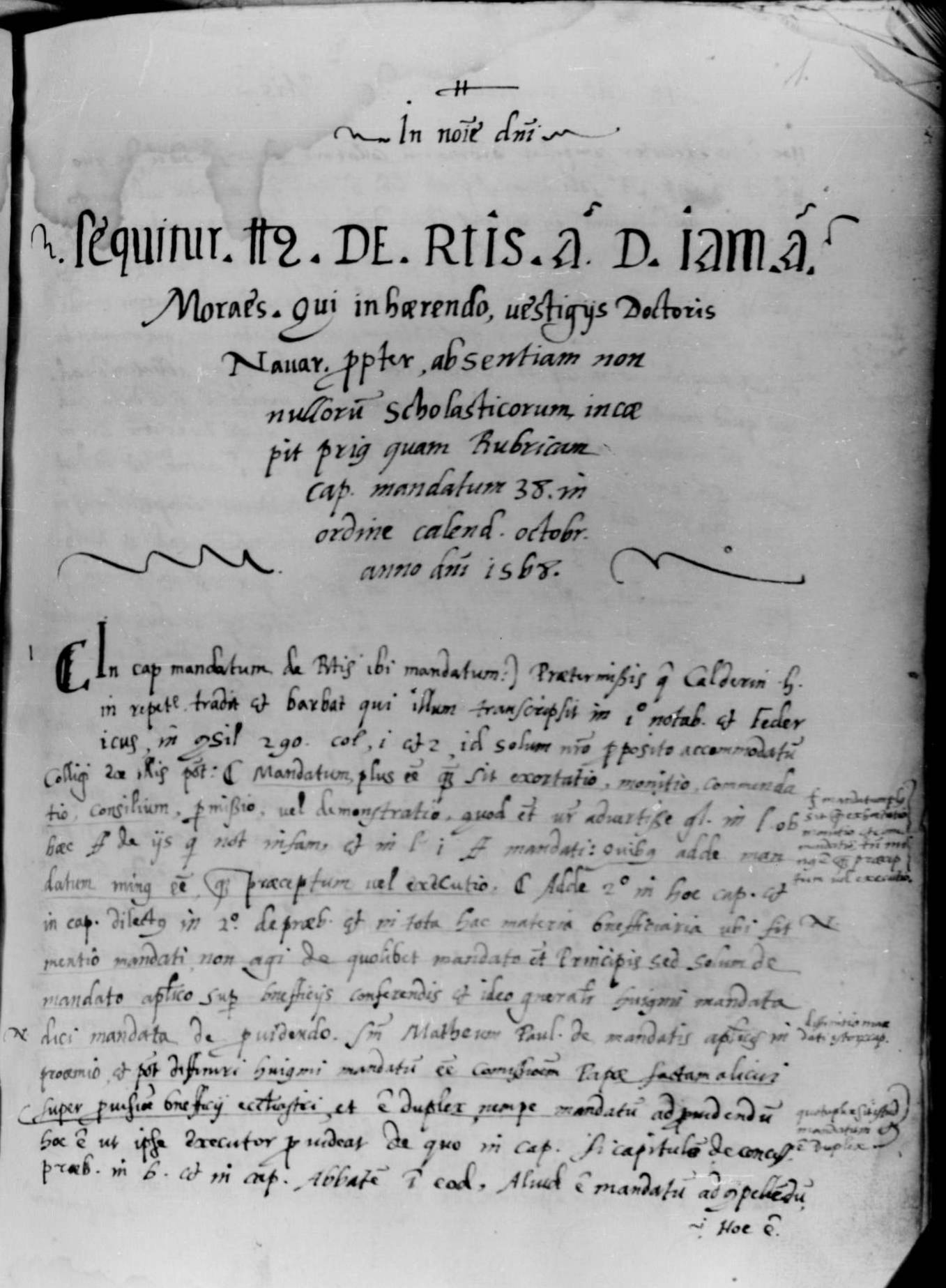
Repetitio ad D. 41.2, 16th-century manuscript. Real Biblioteca del Monasterio de San Lorenzo de El Escorial, Manuscritos latinos, K.II.2, ff. 522–550.

- In 1846, in the midst of the liberal milieu that led to the Revolutions of 1848, the German writer Karl Gutzkow (1811–1878) wrote Uriel Acosta, a play about da Costa's life. This would later become the first classic play to be translated into Yiddish, and it was a longtime standard of Yiddish theater; Uriel Acosta is the signature role of the actor Leo Rafalesco, birth name Leib Rafalovitch, of Sholem Aleichem's Wandering Stars. The first translation into Yiddish was by Osip Mikhailovich Lerner, who staged the play at the Mariinski Theater in Odessa, Ukraine (then part of Imperial Russia) in 1881, shortly after the assassination of Tsar Alexander II. Abraham Goldfaden rapidly followed with a rival production, an operetta, at Odessa's Remesleni Club. Georgian composer Tamara Vakhvakhishvili also composed music for the play.
- Israel Rosenberg promptly followed with his own translation for a production in Łódź (in modern-day Poland). Rosenberg's production starred Jacob Adler in the title role; the play would remain a signature piece in Adler's repertoire to the end of his stage career, the first of the several roles through which he developed the persona that he referred to as "the Grand Jew" (see also Adler's Memoir in the References below).
- Hermann Jellinek (brother of Adolf Jellinek) wrote a book entitled Uriel Acosta (1848).
- Israel Zangwill used the life of Uriel da Costa as one of several fictionalized biographies in his book Dreamers of the Ghetto.
- Agustina Bessa-Luís, Portuguese writer (1922–2019), published in 1984 the novel Um Bicho da Terra ("An Animal of the Earth") based on da Costa's life.
- Ariel Magnus, Argentine writer, published in 2022 the novel (written in Spanish) Uriel y Baruch: El alma de la inmortalidad (Uriel and Baruch: The soul of immortality in English), where he recreates Uriel da Costa's final moments, adding the young Spinoza in the scene.

== Writings ==
- Propostas contra a Tradição (Propositions against the Tradition), ca. 1616. An untitled letter addressed to certain Rabbis, opposing their extra-biblical traditions.
- Exame das tradições phariseas (Examination of Pharisaic Traditions), 1623. Here, Costa argues that the human soul is not immortal. Translated and published by H. P. Salomon and Sassoon.
- Exemplar humanae vitae (Latin for Example of a human life), 1640. Costa's life, questions the authorship of Torah, and expresses trust in natural law.

== See also ==
- Criticism of Judaism
- Criticism of the Talmud
