= Benjamin Prins =

Dutch painter

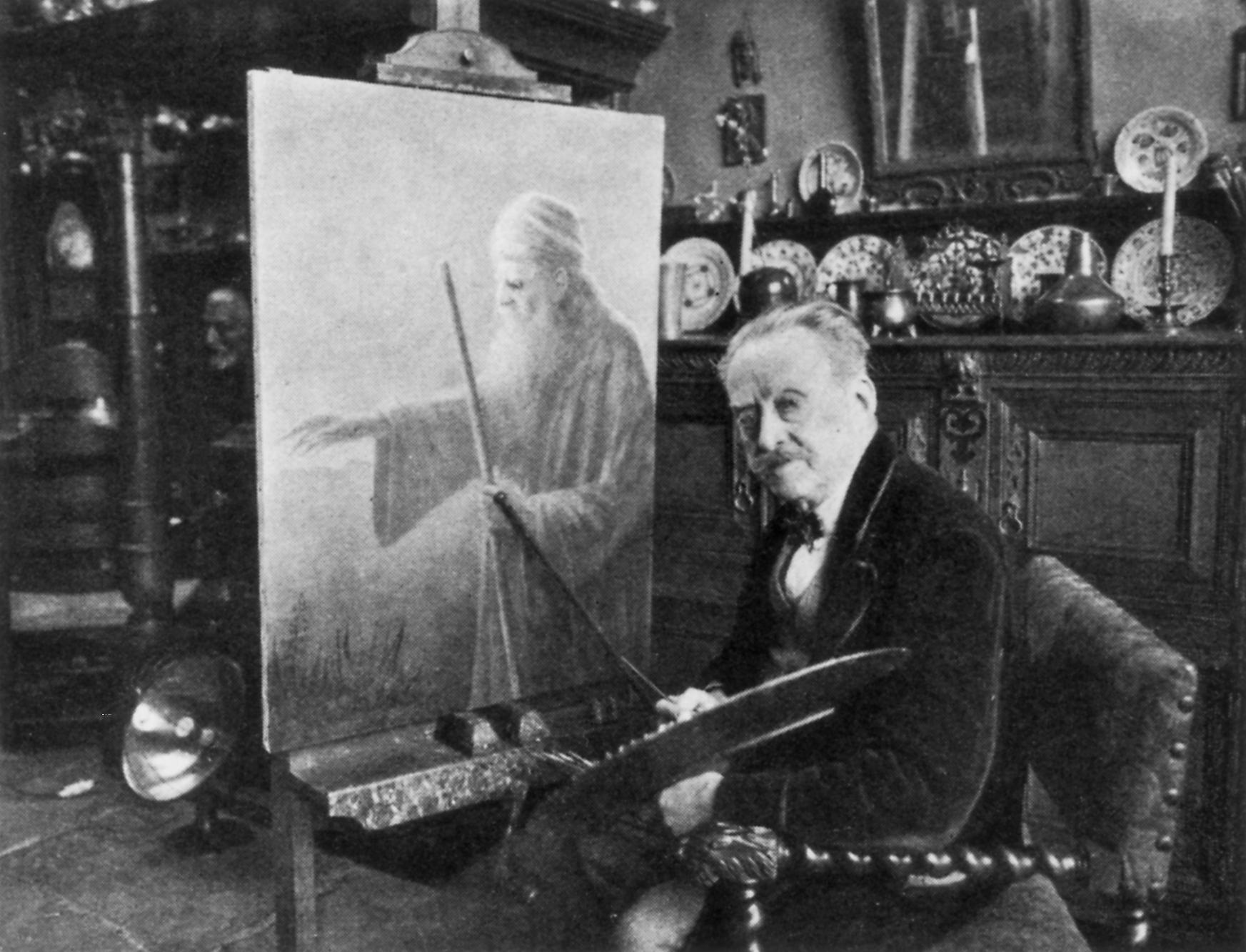
- Benjamin Prins in his atelier, Amsterdam, 1934
- Born: Benjamin Liepman Prins; 20 January 1860; Arnhem, Netherlands
- Died: 4 October 1934 (aged 74); Amsterdam, Netherlands
- Education: Professor August Allebé (1838-1927), Royal Art Academy, Amsterdam; Professor Charles Verlat (1824-1890), Royal Academy, Antwerp; Fernand Cormon (1845-1924), Paris
- Known for: Painting, Drawing, Portraiture
- Notable work: Het Oude en Nieuwe Testament (The Old and the New Testament) (1886)
- Movement: Dutch genre art

Benjamin Liepman Prins (1860–1934) was a Dutch genre artist.

== Biography ==
Benjamin Liepman Prins was born in Arnhem, the Netherlands on 21 January 1860. He was the second of eight children to Eliezer Liepman Philip Prins' first wife, Henrietta Prins-Jacobson (1836–1885). Prins showed an early talent for art and went to study with Professor August Allebé in the Rijksakademie in Amsterdam, where his family had recently moved from Arnhem. Prins joined Allebé’s class around 1877 and studied with him for five years.

His father, Liepman Philip Prins (1835–1915), worked in the family's carpet business for many years. After reaching middle age, Liepman decided to devote the rest of his life to serious and exhaustive Torah study; as part of his investigation he corresponded with many scholars of his generation. These scholarly interests and associations would later have great impact on Benjamin's life. In 1885 Liepman Philip Prins took his family to Frankfurt, where he continued to study and write on a variety of Jewish and general subjects. During a visit to the family there, Benjamin met Rosa Benari, the niece of the famous Jewish painter and sketcher of Jewish holiday scenes, Moritz Oppenheim. Benjamin eventually married Rosa. They had two daughters, Gretha and Molly. His brother-in-law Jacob Eisenmann founded the Eisenmann Synagogue in Antwerp.

Prins' artistic nature found expression not only in his art work but also in the company he kept. His wife, the niece of an artist, and his good friend Max Liebermann demonstrate that he had a close circle of family and friends active in his profession. In the late nineteenth century, an artist was not considered a respectable profession. Vivian Prins, grandson of Benjamin Prins' brother Maurits, writes in 1996:

... In those days, the very rectitude of the middle class's attitudes of the Prins family, in a sense made Uncle Ben something of an oddity and almost an outsider. Because he was a most delightful and charming person, I think he was forgiven by the family for being an artist, but unlike the present era, the middle class attitude towards artists and actors in the [19]20's and 30's was that there was something not entirely respectable about these professions. I should like to hasten to assure you that Uncle Ben was entirely respectable and that he had one of the most valuable assets for life -- a wonderful, observant and sharp sense of humor.

== Art career ==
Prins' happy disposition is found in his cheerful works of art. They show a beauty and serenity in the bourgeoisie, his favorite subjects. His genre paintings, traditional in Dutch culture, are filled with a quiet happiness and humor. Prins' painting Twijfel (Doubt) depicts a young woman holding a hammer while staring at a piggy bank. The woman has mixed emotions about breaking the bank as can be seen from the mischievous glint in her eyes and her head tilted sideways. The title of this painting as well as the composition attests to Prins' sense of humor.

Prins travelled to Belgium in 1884 to study at the Royal Academy, Antwerp with Professor Charles Verlat (1824–1890), whose concepts of beauty and admiration for older art came to have profound influence on Prins. He studied with Verlat for two years. Verlat was known to seek the beauty in reality, and Prins took this search to more profound levels, seeking to understand the beauty of the inner soul, rather than the superficial.

From Antwerp, Prins went to Paris, where he studied with Fernand Cormon (1845–1924) from 1884 to 1886. While studying in Paris in 1886, Benjamin Prins exhibited Het Oude en Nieuwe Testament (The Old and the New Testament) at the Tri-Annual Show in Amsterdam. The painting was enthusiastically accepted by the public; the praise which Prins received at this show encouraged him to stay and work in Paris for two years after completing his studies. During this time, Prins painted many works which were later exhibited all through Europe (London, Milan, Antwerp, Vilna, Rotterdam, and other cities). His success may be measured by the Queen's purchase in 1904 of his work entitled Oude Zeeman (Old Sailor).

By the end of 1888, after having painted in Paris for two years, Prins felt himself ready to begin practicing art as a profession. Sometime that year, Prins returned to Amsterdam to establish himself as an artist there. He specialized in still lifes and made many portraits; some were of Jewish members of the local community, and others of farmers in country garb.

In a letter from 1997, Elsje van der Goot-Elias, Prins' granddaughter, gives us a glimpse of Prins' life in the Netherlands during this time, incorrectly referring to the country as Holland:

− Benjamin Prins was a member and long-time president of the artists' club Arti et Amicitiae as well as a presiding member of another artists' society, St. Lucas Society... Prins used to travel often to North Brabant, in the southern part of Holland, with his daughter Gretha and a few of his friends, and they all worked and stayed near Eindhoven and Geldrop for the purpose of painting landscapes and rural farms. On one such trip Gretha, Prins' daughter met, and later married a cousin, Adolf Elias from Eindhoven.

== Legacy ==
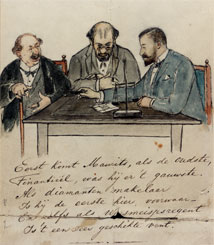
Illustrated letter: Maurits the Diamond Dealer (detail), 1900

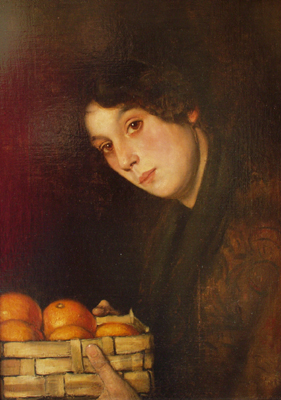
Fruitseller, 1902

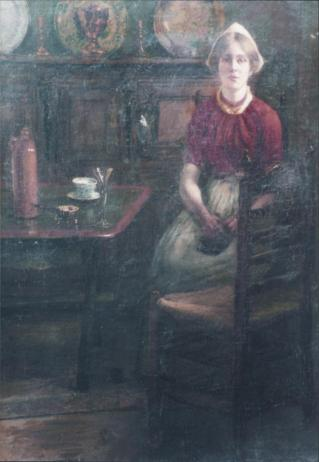
After the Marriage-proposal, c.1909

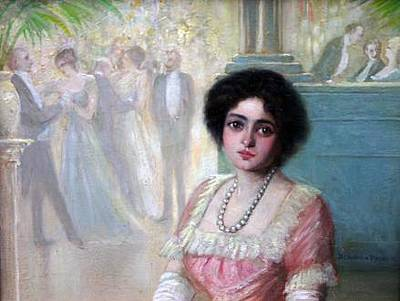
Wallflower

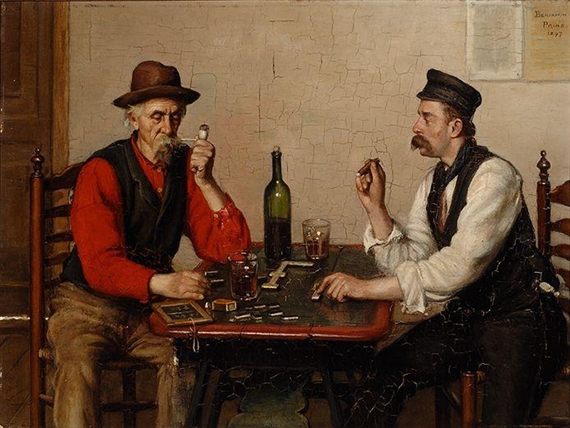
After Work, c.1900

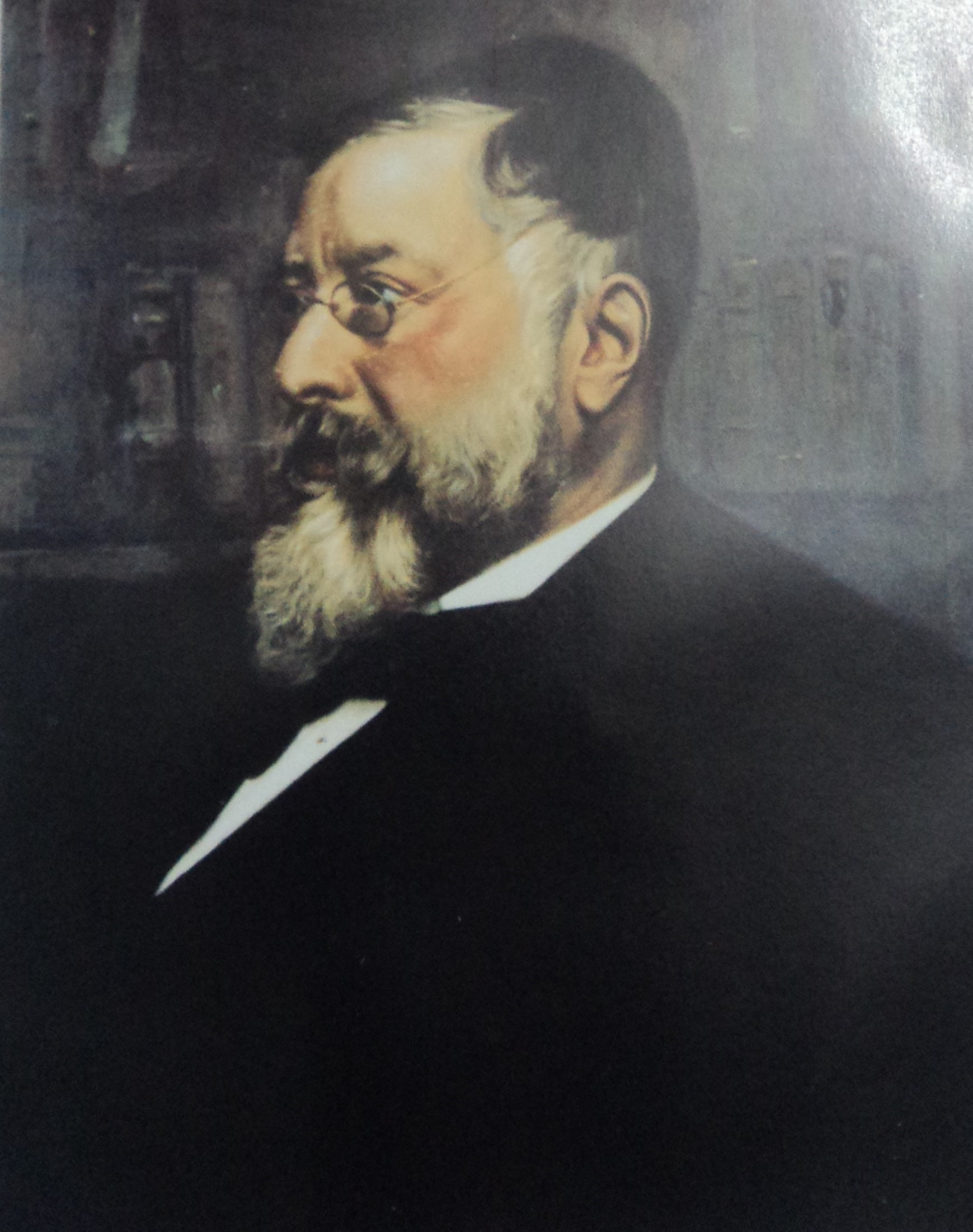
The artist Benjamin Prins, portrait of his father Eliezer Liepman Philip Prins

Benjamin Prins left behind a legacy which lies before us as a montage of faces and places and a style of life which fell victim of the ravages of the Second World War. His history was cut short by the Nazis. Although he himself did not lose his life as a result of the war, his daughter Molly, his sister Dina, a sister-in-law and many nieces and nephews did.
