= Eliezer Liepman Philip Prins =

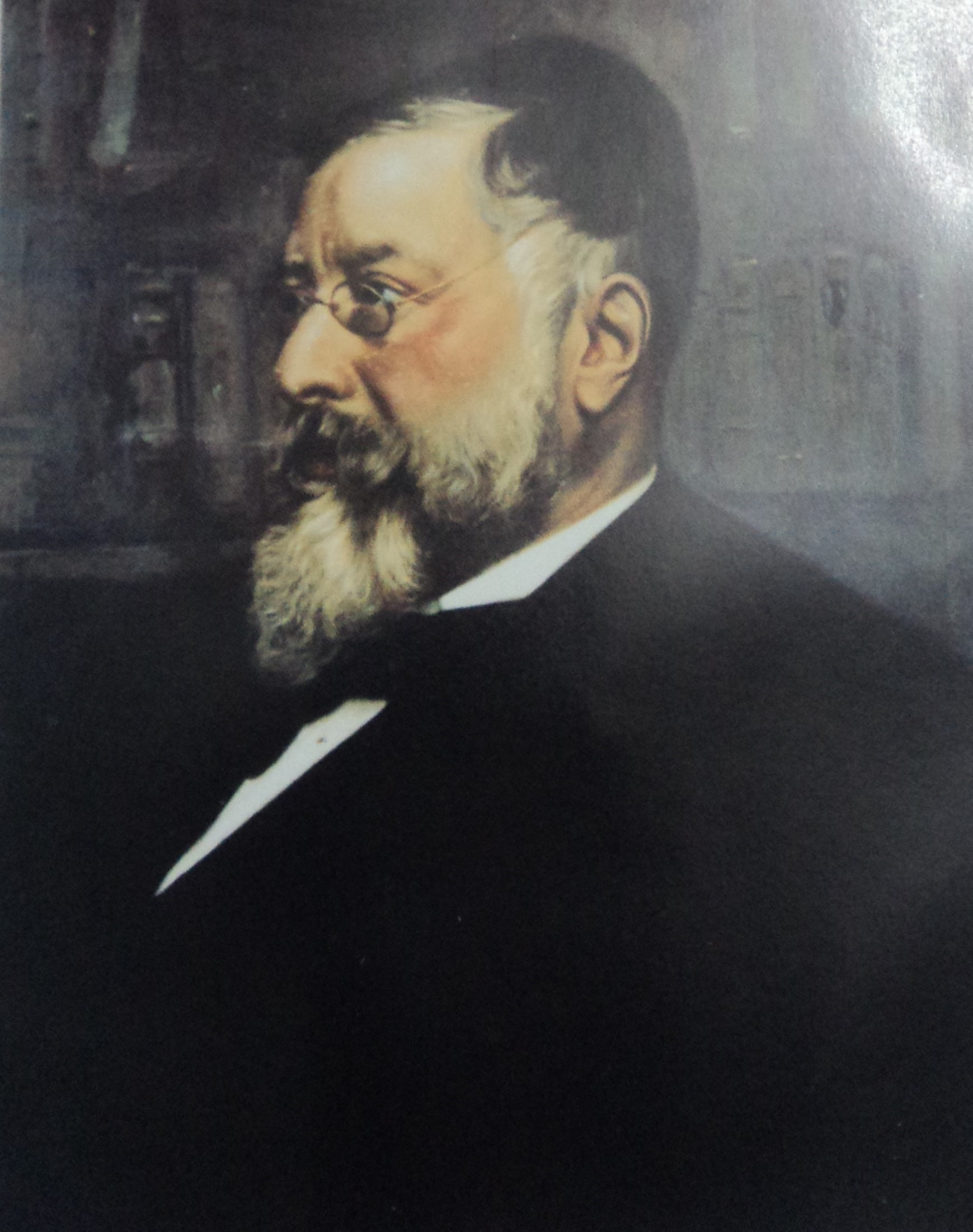
- Born: March 16, 1835; Arnhem, Netherlands
- Died: October 21, 1915 (aged 80); Frankfurt am Main, German Empire
- Resting place: Muiderberg; 31.796856°N 35.180755°E
- Known for: Religious leader
- Title: Parnas

Eliezer Liepman Philip Prins (Eliezer Liepman; 1835 – 1915), merchant and scholar of Arnhem, the Netherlands. Until 1876, Prins was privately tutored, after which time he continued his studies in Amsterdam and moved to Frankfurt in 1887.

== Biography ==
Eliezer Liepman Philip Prins, was the son of Raphael (Philip) Liepman Prins (1802 – 1869) and Mietje Benjamin Prins (née Schaap; 1800 – 1887). He worked in the family's famous carpet business for many years. After he reached middle age, Liepman decided to devote the rest of his life to serious and exhaustive Jewish studies; as part of his investigation he corresponded with many scholars of his generation. In 1885 Eliezer Liepman Philip Prins took his family to Frankfurt, where he continued to study and write on a variety of Jewish and general subjects.

He was married 16 October 1856 in Amsterdam to Henriette Jacobson (1836-1886), the daughter of Jacob Meijer Levien Jacobson (1807-1876) and Sara Abraham Jacobson (1809-1864). They had 8 children:

- Maurits Prins (1858-1932), a diamond dealer who was married to Emma Rosalie Lehmann (1860-1944, Bergen-Belsen), a daughter of Rabbi Marcus Lehmann
- Benjamin Liepman Prins (1860-1934) a painter, married to Theresa Rosa Benari (1862-?)
- Louis Liepman Prins (1861-1862)
- Fannij Prins (1862-1867)
- Dinah Prins (1863-1944, murdered in the Holocaust) married to Jacob Samuel Eisenmann (1859-1913) originally of Frankfurt am Main, and later Antwerpen, where he founded the Eisenmann Synagogue
- Abraham Liepman Prins (1864-1936) a doctor, married to his first cousin Bettij Elias (1871-1952)
- Elisha-Eli Prins (1866-1961) married to Bertha Bondi (1865-1942)
- Justus Liepman Prins (1874-1936)

Following the death of his first wife he remarried in Frankfurt on 18 March 1887 to Sarah Lob of Mainz (1858-1906). They had 4 children:

- Martha Prins (1889-1937)
- Sophie Wilhelmina Shifra Prins (1892-1971) married to Iwan Salomon (1881-1972), who had two children, Els Bendheim and Herman Prins Salomon.
- Estella Hadassah Prins (1893-1968)
- Ludwig (Raphael Yehudah) Prins (1897-1976) married to Mally Kaufman (1892-1959)

After the death of his second wife, he married Jenny Epstein.

== Publications ==
Eliezer Liepman Philip Prins edited and published the following books:

- The previously unedited part of the work by David Abudirham, Tashlum-Abudraham, for Mekitze Nirdamim (1900), publisher
- The second edition of Seder Berakhot by Michael Moravsky, introduction
- Annotations on the tractate Ḥullin (204b)
- Annotations on the siddur (in Oẓar ha-Tefillot, 1915)
- Many articles in Jewish weeklies and journals
- Letters and correspondences including She'elot ve'teshuvot to leading rabbis of his day

In recent years more details became known about him as one of his grandchildren, Els Bendheim, initiated the publication of his correspondence, the marginal notes he made in his books, and an anthology of his work in Dutch.

The Eliezer Liepman Philip Prins library, consisting of 6,000 books, was moved to Jerusalem (and opened to the public in 1930); it is still kept as such at the Lifshitz College of Education.
