= Herman Prins Salomon =

Dutch-American linguist and historian (1930–2021)

- Born: March 1, 1930; Amsterdam, the Netherlands
- Died: January 31, 2021 (aged 90); Albany, New York
- Occupation: Professor of French Language
- Awards: Order of Orange-Nassau, Knight

Academic background
- Education: New York University, University of Amsterdam, Catholic University of Nijmegen

Herman Prins Salomon (1 March 1930 – 31 January 2021) was a Dutch-American linguist and historian who specialized in the history of the Portuguese Jews, the New Christians, and the Inquisition.

Salomon was a professor of the Department of Languages, Literatures and Cultures at the State University of New York at Albany (SUNY Albany). He also was editor of the American Sephardi, a scholarly magazine published by Yeshiva University. In June 2011, he was knighted by the Queen of the Netherlands into the Order of Orange-Nassau.

== Life ==
Herman P. Salomon was born in Amsterdam as a grandson of Eliezer Liepman Philip Prins and a younger cousin of the lawyer and historian Izak Prins (1887-1968). Having moved with his family in 1939 to Canada, he attended school in Montreal, subsequently finishing Fieldston High School in New York. He graduated from New York University with a B.A. in French Literature and then returned for extended stays to the Netherlands. At the University of Amsterdam, he took up from 1954 the study of Romance Languages and Literatures, obtaining his Candidaats Diploma and Doctoraal Diploma. He earned a Master of Arts degree in French Literature from New York University and in 1988, a Doctorate in Romance Languages from the Catholic University of Nijmegen.

Since 1969, Salomon was Professor of French Literature at the State University of New York at Albany (SUNY Albany). He introduced Dutch and Portuguese studies at the Department of Languages, Literatures and Cultures of his university, from which he retired in 2010 after 42 years of service. He also was editor of the American Sephardi, a scholarly magazine published by Yeshiva University.

On April 21, 2011, Salomon was knighted by the Queen of the Netherlands and was made Knight of the Order of Orange-Nassau at a ceremony at the Consulate of the Netherlands. The award recognized his world-class scholarship on the history of Portuguese Jews in the Netherlands as well as his role in developing the study of the Dutch language at the University at Albany. Salomon also received an Honorary Doctorate from the University of Lisbon in 2012.

== Work ==
Salomon wrote pioneering work in Sephardic history and Inquisition studies. Besides his scholarly articles, his most important contributions were his annotated translations of important works by Amsterdam Jews. Early in his career, Salomon published and translated to English a unique family history written by the Portuguese-Jewish merchant Isaac de Pinto, who fled Antwerp for the Dutch Republic in 1646. A connoisseur of archival documents as well as manuscripts, Salomon published and analyzed documents preserved in Portugal’s national archives in his volume Os primeiros portugueses de Amesterdão, which illuminated the earliest years of ex-converso settlement in Amsterdam. In another major contribution, Salomon published in 1988 an annotated edition of a lengthy and fascinating manuscript by the learned Amsterdam rabbi Saul Levi Mortera, Tratado da verdade da lei de Moisés, in which the author articulated a Jewish position on Calvinism (liberally citing passages from Calvin’s Institutes).

Of Salomon's literary discoveries, one stands out in particular. Jointly with his colleagues Adri Offenberg and Harm den Boer, he undertook systematic efforts to retrieve the lengthy, long-lost work Exame das tradições phariseas (Examination of Pharisaic Tradition), in which Uriel da Costa had attacked rabbinic Judaism and the doctrine of the immortality of the soul. This work, printed in Amsterdam in 1623, was soon thereafter banned and destroyed. Scholars had searched in vain for a surviving copy until Salomon found one in the Royal Library in Copenhagen in 1989. He and I.S.D. Sassoon published the text in 1993 in a facsimile edition with an English translation. Da Costa’s recovered treatise is now essential reading for the study of early challenges to rabbinic authority among Amsterdam’s Portuguese Jews.

In 2014, Salomon published the extensive confidential memoirs of the Portuguese Inquisitor António Ribeiro de Abreu, who in 1738 and 1743 defended his institution against the critique of the jesuit António Vieira. This text, which offers a unique insight into the workings of the Holy Office, appeared in the original Portuguese under the title Queimar Vieira em estátua (Burning Vieira in Effigy).
