= Paul-Gustave van Hecke =

Belgian journalist (1887–1967)

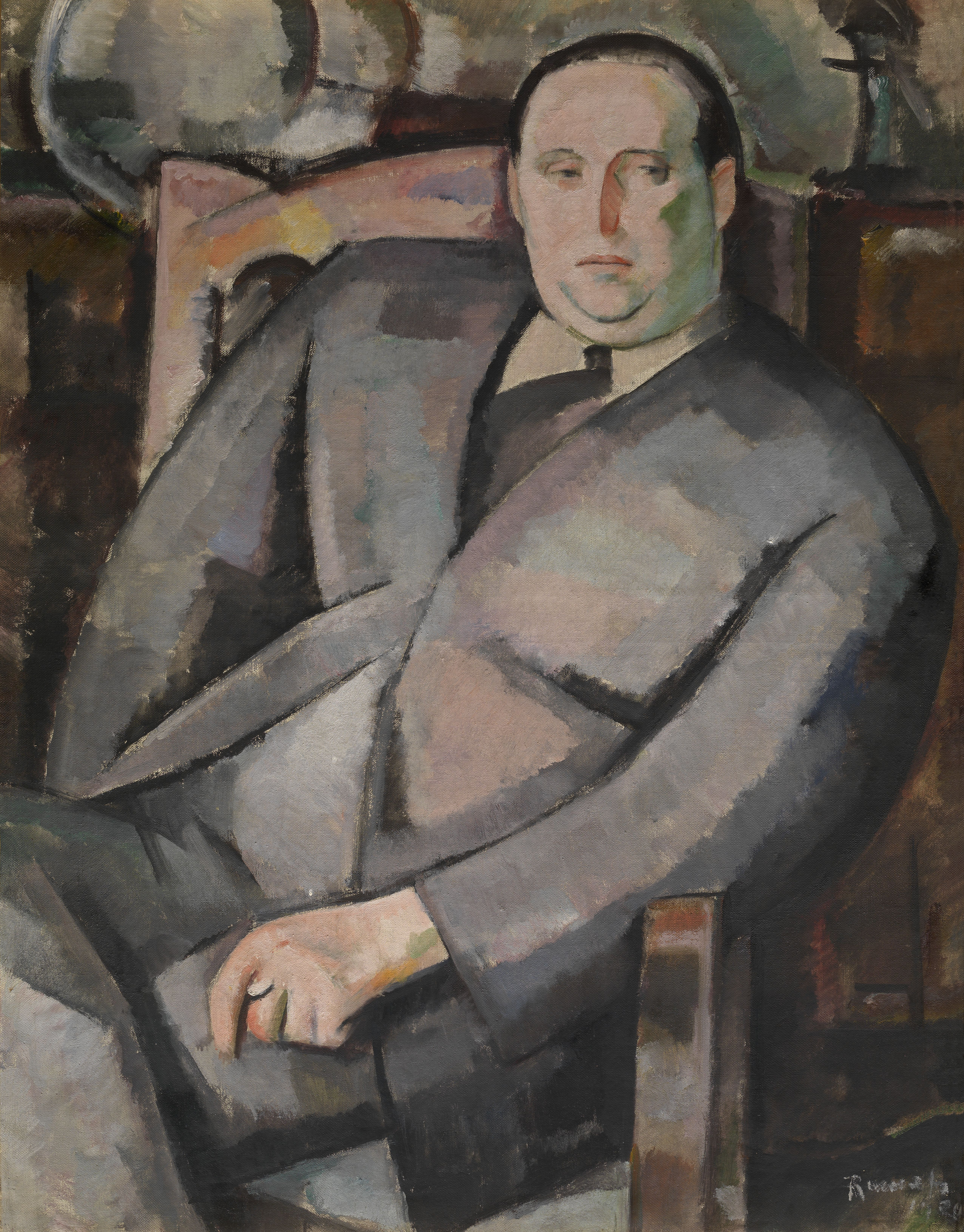
P.G. van Hecke; by Ramah (1920)

Paul-Gustave van Hecke (27 December 1887, Ghent - 23 February 1967, Ixelles) was a Belgian journalist, author, art collector and promoter, couturier, and organizer of film festivals. He was a patron to Frits Van den Berghe, Gustave De Smet and René Magritte, among others.

== Biography ==
His father was a potato merchant and grocer. After his father's death, in 1897, Paul Verbauwen (1844-1926), one of the leaders of the Ghent Worker's Party, became his guardian. He began his primary education in an industrial school. When he was sixteen, he became friends with Hendrik de Man and they created a Socialist study circle together. In 1905, he became co-founder and secretary of the Socialist Young Guard and published his first writings.

Not long after, he suddenly renounced politics and opted for a career as a writer. He also worked as an actor. By 1907, together with Reimond Kimpe and Octaaf Steghers (1889-1942), among others, he had created a literary magazine called Nieuw Leven. A frequent theme of his articles there involved what he felt was the miserable state of the theaters in Flanders. By 1909, this had led to the foundation of the Flemish Association for Theater and Performing Arts, with Jan Oscar De Gruyter as its Artistic Director and Van Hecke as its Secretary.

During this time, he settled in Sint-Martens-Latem, the site of an influential art colony. There, he became a sort of "spiritual director" for the artists who made up the Latem School of painting. Gustave De Smet, Frits Van den Berghe and Constant Permeke became his lifelong friends.

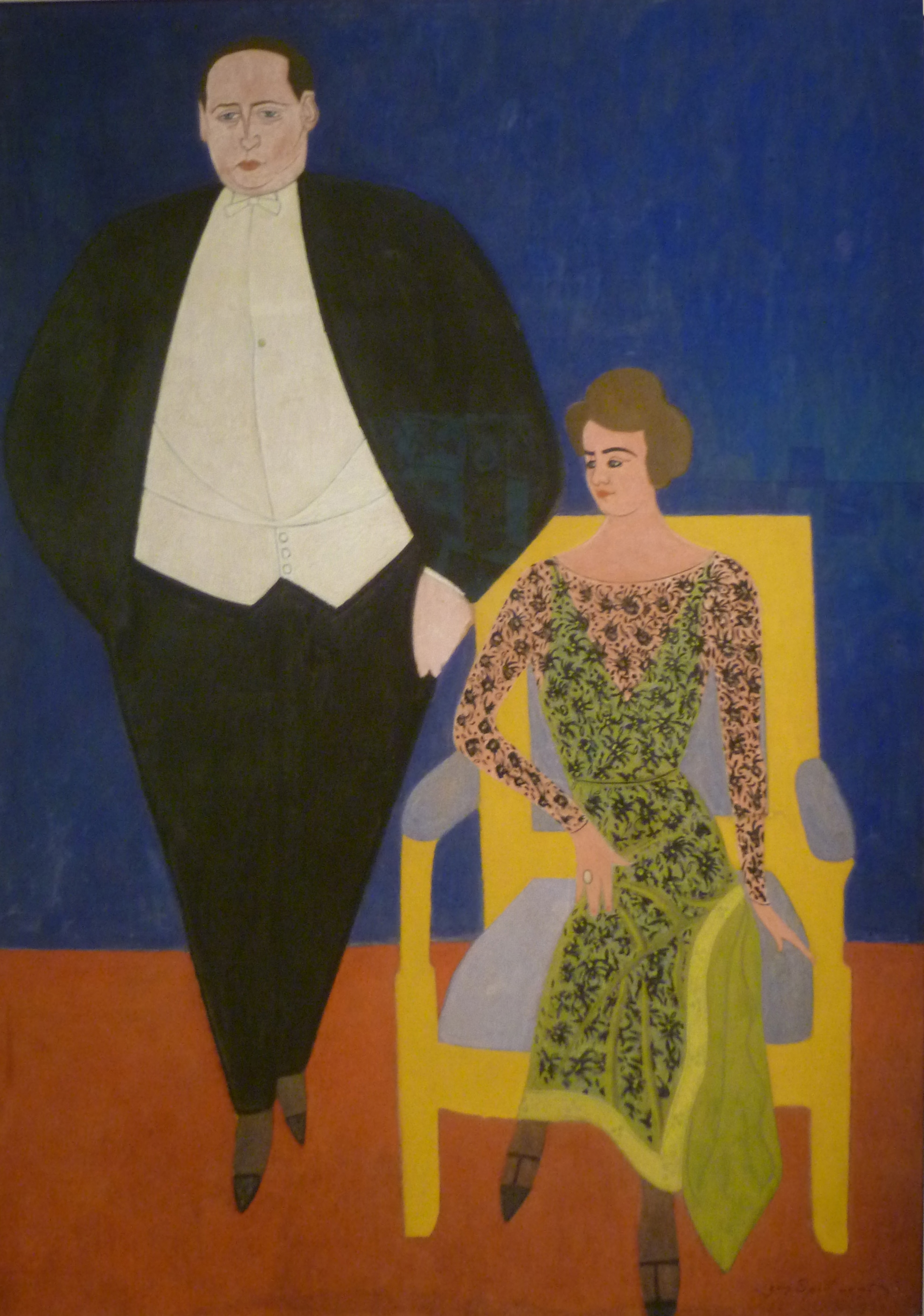
P.G. van Hecke and Norine; by Léon Spilliaert (1920)

Throughout his career, he lost enthusiasm for projects when any conflicts developed. As a result, he abandoned Nieuw Leven in favor of the new cosmopolitan magazine De Boomgaard (The Orchard), where he wanted to re-establish the tradition of the pioneering Van Nu en Straks (Of Now and Later). In addition to himself, the editors there included Pieter Nicolaas van Eyck and Paul Kenis, among others. He then became interested in pursuing a journalistic career and moved to Antwerp to work on the De Nieuwe Gazet and the French-language magazine, La Métropole. There, he met Maria Barbery, who would become his first wife in 1912. The marriage became troubled almost immediately, but they were not officially divorced until 1921. He created another literary magazine in 1913, De Tijd (The Times) but, due to a combination of his losing interest and the beginning of World War I, it was short-lived.

Shortly after the war began, he moved to Brussels, became involved in the Flemish Movement, and worked as a reporter for De Vlaamsche Post, a paper with German financial connections. In 1915, together with Adolf Clauwaert and Lodewijk Peerenboom, he took over the Alhambra Theater. This lasted only a short time when, to the dismay of his friends, he became Director of a small French theater called "La Bonbonnière". This also lasted for only a few months, until he met Honorine Deschrijver (known as "Norine") and they opened a couturier's shop together. For the first time, he was making a considerable amount of money, which resulted in the establishment of a publishing house, three magazines and an art gallery.

=== Post-war enterprises ===
The publishing house, established in 1920, was Het Roode Zeil (The Red Sail). Its first publication was a collection of poems by Karel van de Woestijne. Other notable publications included the surrealist novel, Mélusine, by Franz Hellens and La Lumière, a play by Georges Duhamel. An accompanying magazine was cancelled after nine issues, due to unprofitability. The gallery, Sélection, was also established in 1920 and won the immediate support of his old friends from editing days. It closed two years later, but an associated magazine continued, sporadically, until 1933. A third magazine, Signaux de France et de Belgique, lasted for barely one year.

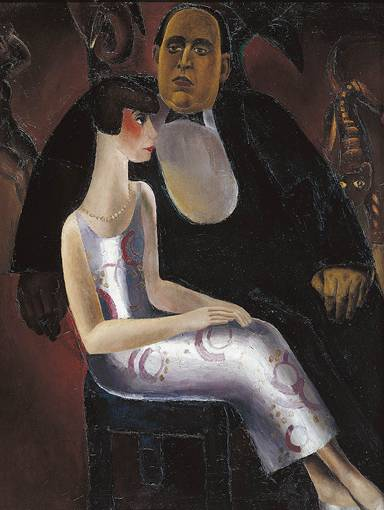
P.G. van Hecke and Norine; by Frits Van den Berghe (1923)

In 1928, he opened another art gallery in Brussels; L'Époque. Shortly after, another magazine, the monthly Variétés, began publication. It was a richly illustrated magazine that catered to popular tastes and current styles; although it included works by such noted artists as James Ensor, Wassily Kandinsky, Giorgio de Chirico and Max Ernst, as well as Van Hecke's friends. At this time, he also developed an interest in Surrealism, which led him to provide support for René Magritte, Paul Delvaux and, years later, Marcel Mariën. The 1930s depression brought an end to many of these enterprises and he was forced to sell off his private collection to save Le Couturier Norine.

In 1931, he already started working as a journalist again, for the Socialist newspaper, Vooruit (Forward), where he created a "Spiritual Life" section. During World War II, he and the other editors fled to France. They returned after Belgium's capitulation to find the paper in German hands. During the remainder of the war, he supplemented his couturier's income by becoming an art dealer. In 1943, he joined with Angèle Manteau to set up and manage the French language division of her publishing house, Éditions Lumière. He also edited her weekly magazine, Zondagspost and, in 1944, combined that with an editorial position at the French Socialist newspaper, Le Peuple. Most of this activity had ceased within two years of the war's end.

During his tenure at Vooruit, he had written some film criticism so, in 1947, his interests turned in that direction. That same year, in June, he organized the first "Mondial du Film et des Beaux-arts" festival in Brussels. The festival's second edition took place in Knokke in 1949, in conjunction with a modern art exhibit at the local casino. In 1950, he became Director-General of the Société des Cinémas Pathé and managed several movie theaters in Brussels, including the Pathé Palace.

For the next decade, he was largely involved with the festivals and exhibitions in Knokke. As the 1960s began, his health problems increased and he often considered withdrawing from public life. He died in 1967, at his home in Ixelles. Norine died ten years later. They had no children.

== Sources ==
- André De Rache, Hommage à Paul-Gustave van Hecke, Brussel, 1969.
- Bart de Volder, "Paul-Gustave van Hecke", in: Oostvlaamse Literaire Monografieën Part IX., Provinciebestuur Oost-Vlaanderen, Ghent 1989, p. 161-192
- Gert Van Overloop, "Paul-Gustave Van Hecke", in: Nieuwe encyclopedie van de Vlaamse Beweging, Tielt, Lannoo, 1998. ISBN 978-90-209-3042-9
- Virginie Devillez, Peter J.H. Pauwels (Eds.), Kunstpromotor Paul-Gustave van Hecke (1887-1967) en de avant-garde, Koninklijke Musea voor Schone Kunsten van België/Uitgeverij Snoeck, Brussel/Gent-Kortrijk, 2012. ISBN 978-94-616-1043-0
- Manu van der Aa, Sjoerd van Faassen, Hans Renders and Marc Somers (Eds.), Paul-Gustave van Hecke (1887-1967), Antwerpen, Garant 2012 ISBN 978-90-441-2948-9
- Manu van der Aa, Tatave! Paul-Gustave van Hecke. Kunstpaus–modekoning–salonsocialist, Tielt, Lannoo, 2017. ISBN 978-94-014-4208-4
