= Carol Deutsch =

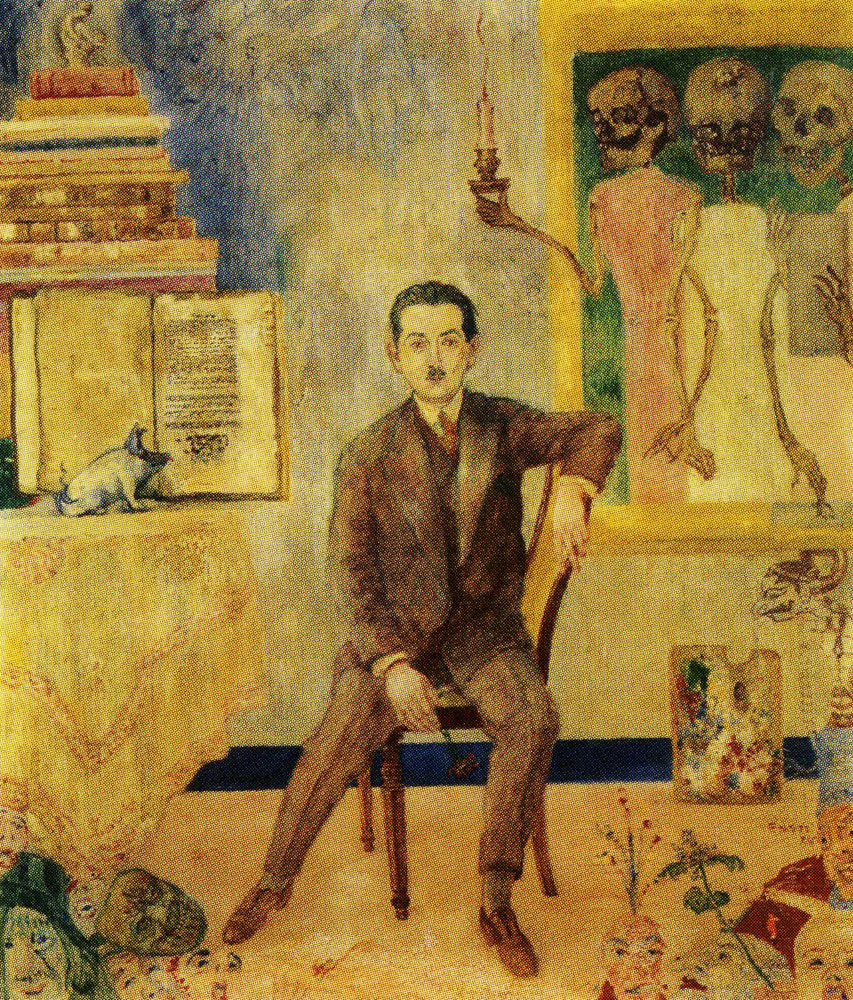
- portrait of Carol Deutsch painted by his friend James Ensor (1928)
- Born: April 21, 1894; Antwerp, Belgium
- Died: December 20, 1944 (aged 50); Buchenwald concentration camp, Germany
- Notable work: Pentateuch
- Movement: Expressionism, Primitivism

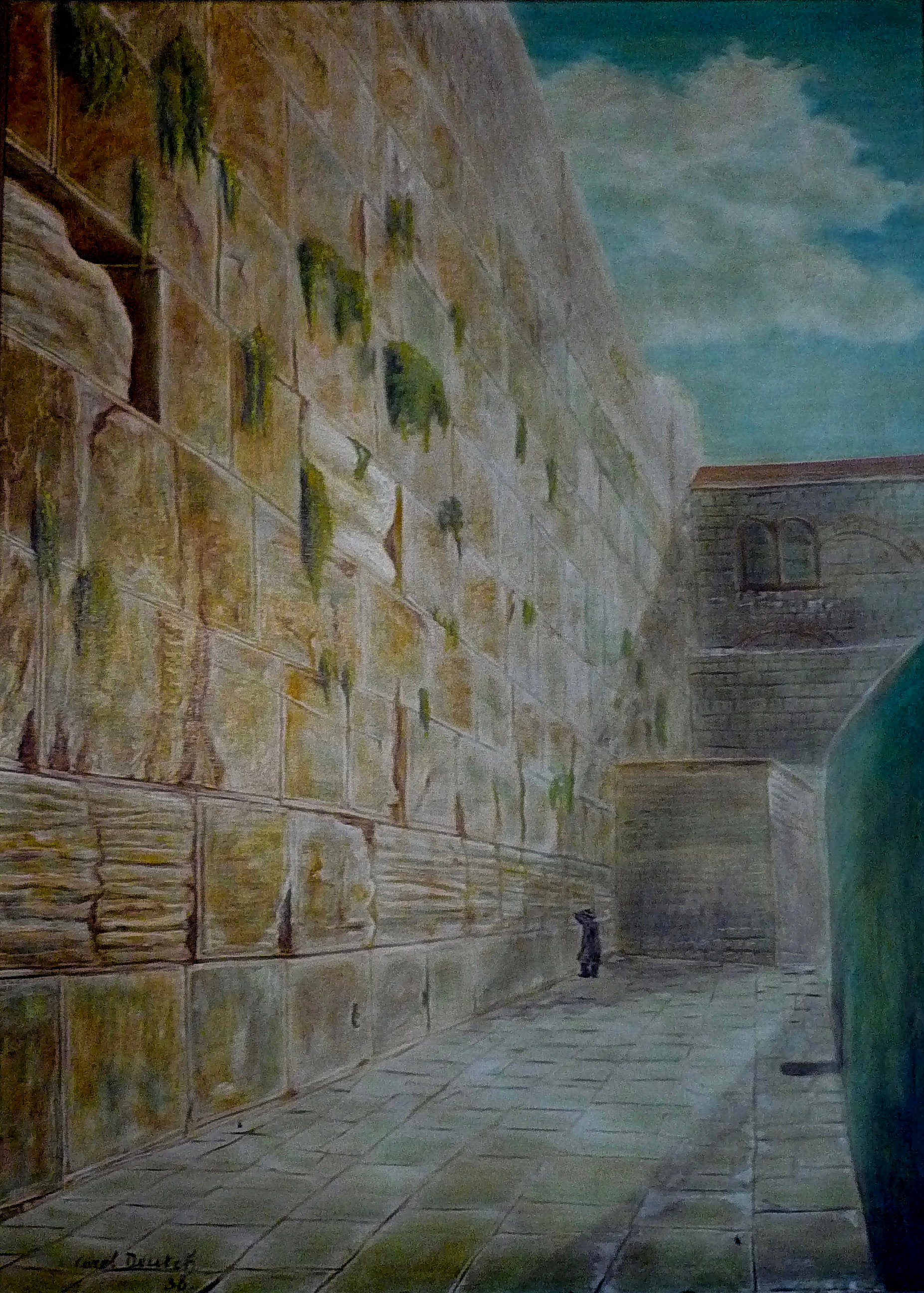
"The West Wall" (1938)

Carol Deutsch (1894-1944) was a Belgian-Jewish painter who was murdered in the Holocaust. A student of James Ensor, Deutsch is most known for his Art Nouveau illustrations of the Bible.

Having had an Orthodox upbringing, Deutsch had not received art training into his twenties, when working as a fur trader in Ostend, he became close with James Ensor. Ensor recognized his talent and became his teacher, and Deutsch became part of Ostend's artistic scene, being influenced by Constant Permeke and Léon Spilliaert.

Deutsch painted in an Expressionist style, both landscapes and people. He became the chairman of Ostend's Jewish community in 1929, but soon was nearly excommunicated for painting provocative nudes. He then turned to cityscapes and portraits. He visited Mandatory Palestine in 1936, which made his focus change to Jewish themes, such as the Western Wall.

Deutsch was arrested with his wife, Fela, by the Gestapo in 1943, and deported to Auschwitz concentration camp. He was murdered by shooting at Buchenwald concentration camp in December 1944. His daughter donated his collection of 99 Pentateuch illustrations to Yad Vashem.
