= Honorine Deschrijver =

Belgian fashion designer

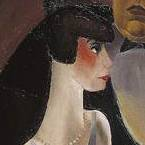
- crop from a 1923 painting by Frits Van den Berghe
- Born: 5 March 1887; Ghent, Belgium
- Died: 1977 (aged 89–90); Brussels, Belgium
- Education: Antwerpse Modeacademie
- Employer: Couture Norine
- Known for: Modernist movement in fashion

Honorine Maria "Norine" Deschrijver (5 March 1887 – 1977) was a Belgian fashion designer and a prominent representative of the Modernist movement in fashion.

== Life ==
Honorine Deschrijver was born as an extramarital child to a Ghent maid on 5 March 1887. She grew up in the Brugse Poort in Ghent and moved to Brussels at the age of 14. When she met Paul-Gustave van Hecke around 1915, she was still married to her first husband.

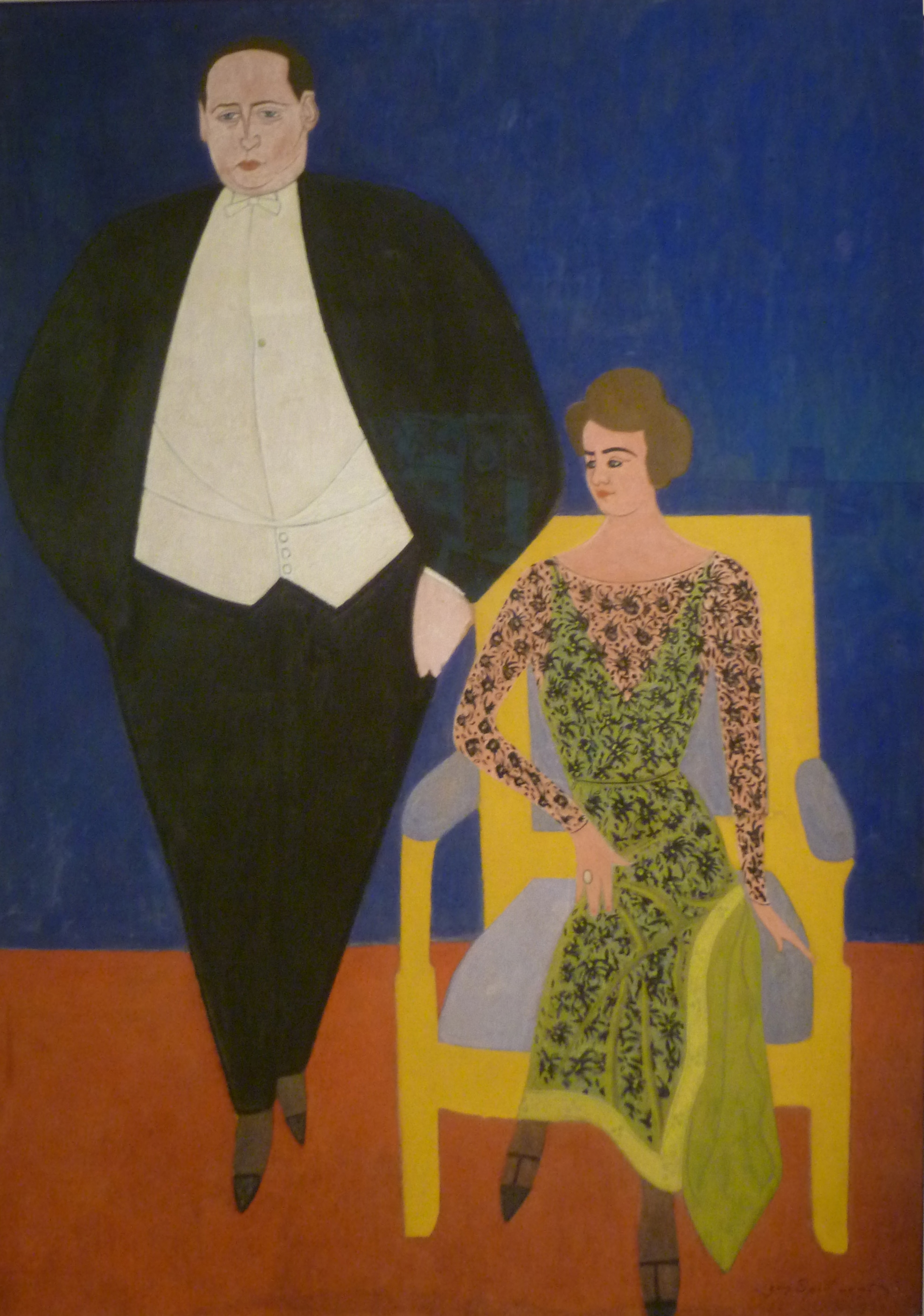
P.G. Van Hecke en Norine (1920) by Léon Spilliaert

Van Hecke was a collector and art critic who ran an art gallery called "Le Centaure" on the Avenue Louise. In 1916 Deschrijver and Van Hecke started the couture house "Couture Norine" on Avenue Louise in Brussels. In 1927 she married Van Hecke. Through her husband she gained contacts with important Belgian artists. Léon Spilliaert portrayed her in a double portrait with her husband (Ostend, Mu.ZEE); Edgard Tytgat portrayed her in the painting "Remembrance of a Sunday" getting out of a boat (Deurle, Museum Dhondt-Dhaenens). The couple were also painted by Man Ray. Marcel-Louis Baugniet designed the interior of the fashion store. René Magritte signed publicity for Couture Norine.

Deschrijver's designs for women's clothing were distinguished by modernism and originality. She was called the "Coco Chanel of the North". Her career ran from the early interwar period to the 1960s, but she enjoyed her largest success during the Roaring Twenties.
