= Roger Remaut =

Belgian painter (born 1942)

Rogier (Roger) Remaut (born Ostend, 17 August 1942) is a Belgian painter (material art). Using mixed media (acrylic), his works are constructions of material incorporating objects found, texture, layers of paint and graffiti. The paintings are built up slowly with many layers of matter and paint.

== Education ==
Roger Remaut studied art at the Ostend Academy under artists Gustaaf Sorel, Maurice Boel and Willy Bosschem. He then followed a course at the Westhoek Academy. As a painter he is an autodidact.

== Career ==
He had his first exhibition, together with his brother Pierre Remaut, in 1982 in Galerie de Pepperbusse in Ostend.

Selections in international competitions followed with shows in Belgium, the Netherlands, France, Luxemburg, Germany and the United Kingdom. His works hang in public and private collections including those of the Belgian national and local governments and the Museum of Fine Arts, Ostend.

== Distinctions ==
- 1982 Prize for painting, Harelbeke Belgium
- 1983 Hoppe Prize, Poperinge Belgium
- 1983 Work in the collection of Tuinbouwschool, Puurs, Belgium
- 1984 Gaver Prize, Waregem Belgium
- 1985 Prize for painting, Aarschot Belgium
- 1986 Work in the national collection of Belgium
- 1986 Work in the office of the Minister for Internal Affairs, Belgium
- 1990 Work in the Museum of Fine Art, Ostend.
- 1992 Ostend artists in Maastricht, the Netherlands
- 1992 Luxemburg City Art Centre Luxemburg
- 1995 Coleurs en Val Mosan, Huyl, Belgium
- 1996 Work in the Flemish government collection.
- 1998 Essex Open, GB
- 1998 Southwark Arts Association Open, London, GB
- 1998 Norwich Film & Multimedia Festival, GB
- 1999 Essex Open, GB
- 2005 International Assemblage Artist Exhibition, Berlin, Germany.
