= Testerep =

Former island along the Belgian coast

Coordinates: 51°11′24″N 2°49′48″E

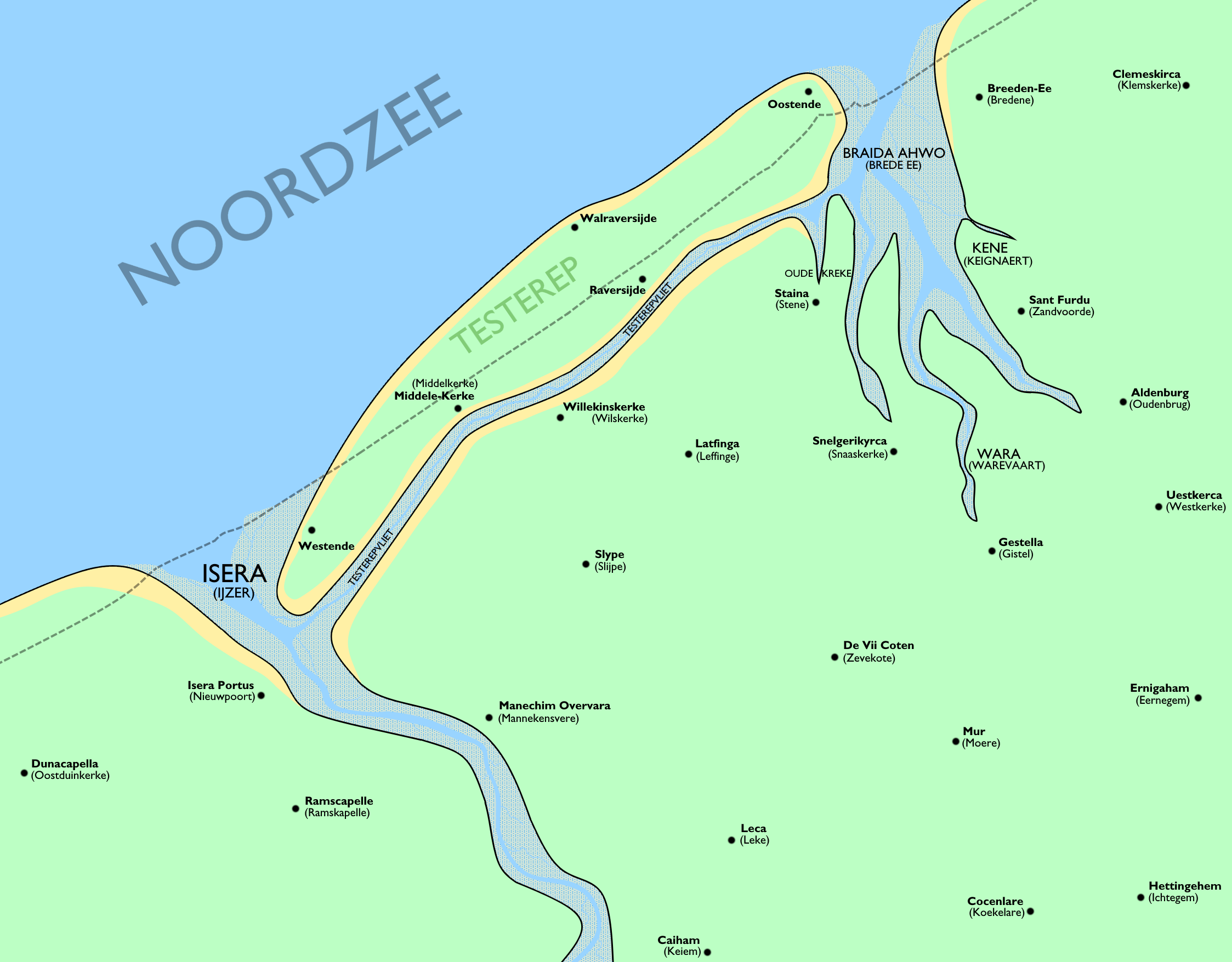
The Flemish Coast in the middle ages with Testerep island

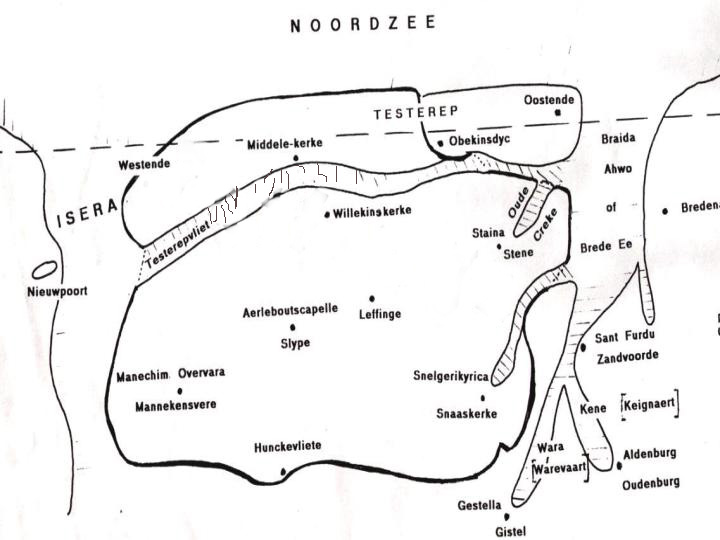
The Flemish Coast in the middle ages with Testerep island

Testerep (or Ter Streep) once comprised an island along the Belgian coast. It existed as early as the 5th century. From the 10th century Fishing villages were scattered about, including Ostend and Westende, with Ostend on the far east (Oost-ende: east-end), Westende on the far west (West-ende: west-end), and Middelkerke (literally "middle-church") the middle of the island.

== History ==
=== Creation ===
Testerep arose around the 5th and 6th century in front of the Belgian North Sea coast between Nieuwpoort and Bredene, as a result of tidal forces. The headland, commonly called "Ter Streep", was separated from the mainland by the Testerepvliet, a southernly situated tidal channel that was completely inundated at high tide. Because Testerep in subsequent centuries regularly flooded, permanent residence on the island was impossible. Only after a protective dune belt had formed in the 10th century modest settlements of mainly fishermen and sheep herders arose on the island. First Ostend was created in the 990s on the east end of Testerep, then followed by Westende on the west end and Middelkerke in the middle.

=== Growth of Ostend and Environmental Pressures ===
As a fishing village situated at the easternmost end of the island, Ostend's strategic location on the North Sea gave it growing importance. Its position on the natural channel that was beginning to breach the island's dunes made it an ideal port. In 1267, Margaretha of Constantinople, Countess of Flanders, granted the settlement city rights, which spurred its development into a significant harbour town. This growth, however, coincided with a period of intense storm activity and rising sea levels that placed the entire island under severe threat.

=== Catastrophic Storm Surges ===
Beginning in the 12th century, a series of catastrophic storm surges began to permanently reshape the coastline. The All Saints' Flood of 1170 was particularly destructive, eroding dune barriers along the North Sea coast. Over the following century, successive storms, including St. Lucia's flood in 1287, continued to batter Testerep. These events progressively submerged the lower-lying parts of the island, widened the channel east of Ostend, and eventually led to a major breach that permanently separated Ostend from the mainland. The western part of the island, which housed Westende and Middelkerke, was gradually fused with the mainland as the channel behind it silted up, while the sea claimed much of the land in between.

=== The Fall of the First Ostend ===
As the city of Ostend expanded, its inhabitants systematically flattened the surrounding dunes to make room for development. This removal of the island's natural sea defences left the settlement critically exposed. The consequences were catastrophic. The St. Clement's Flood in 1334 caused widespread devastation across the already vulnerable land. The final blow came with the enormous St. Vincent's Flood in 1393, which completely ruined the original city. Thousands of townspeople were forced to leave the original city and founded a second Ostend five hundred meters inland, no longer on the island of Testerep but on land in the Bredene district.

=== Disappearance of Testerep ===
In the 15th and 16th centuries, the devastating tidal waves of a new series of storm surges would eventually sink the northern half of Testerep into the North Sea. After poldering of the Testerep gully, the southern part would form part of the mainland from the twelfth century, the widest part of which formed Westende and Lombardsijde.

=== Present ===
During the reclamation of the newly silted channel lands, the Testerepvliet was canalized into the "Groot Geleed", a still existing drainage ditch north of the Moere-Blote- en Moere-Nieuwlandpolder. The IJzer river (current harbor channel near Nieuwpoort) still has on its eastern bank some mudflats and marshes as small remains of the old creek. Together with the nature reserve "IJzermonding", the "Sint-Laureins beach" with the dunes behind it and the former naval base in Lombardsijde, this area used to form the Ijzer estuary.
