= Westende =

- Deelgemeente
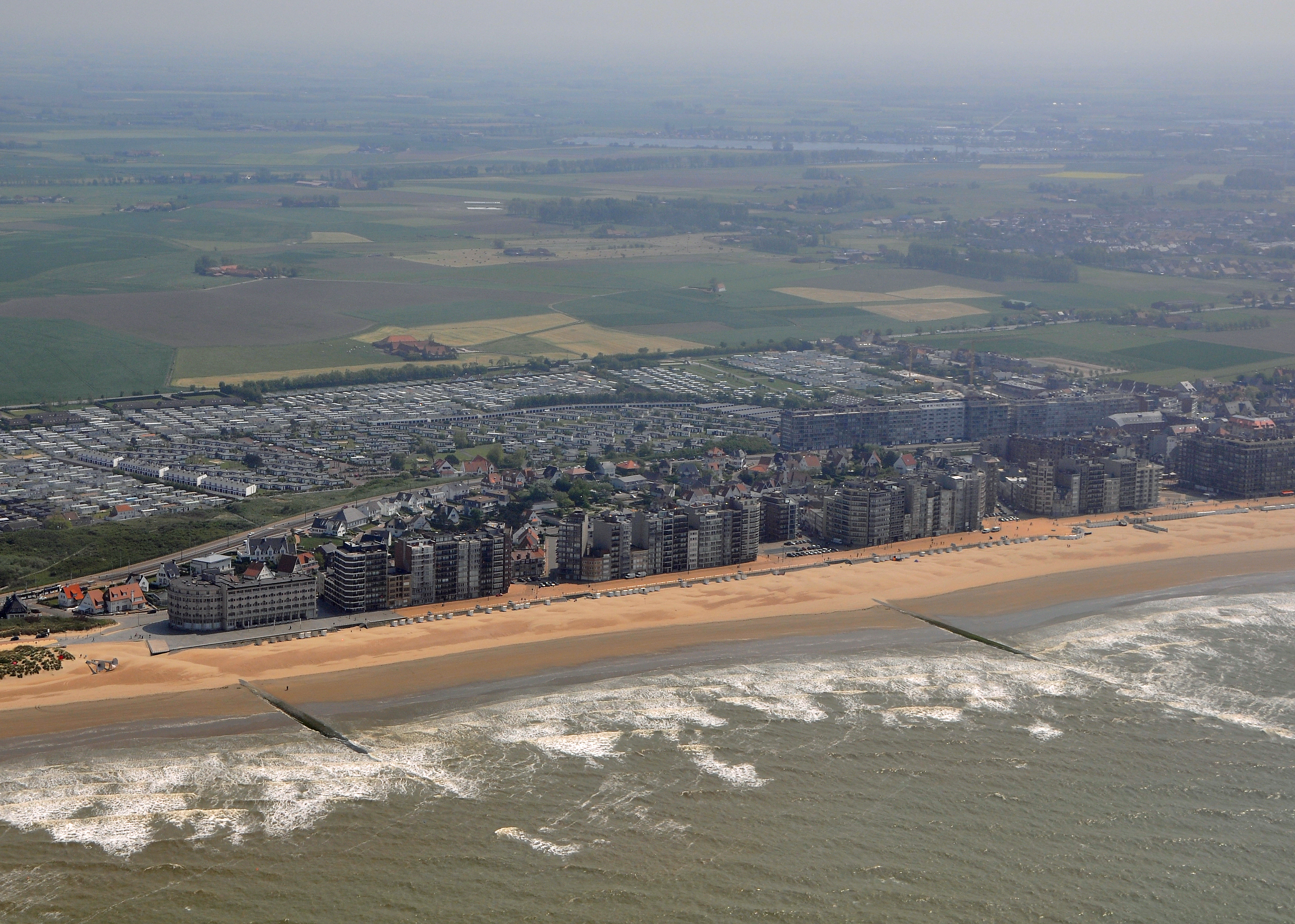
- Aerial view of Westende

- Coordinates: 51°09′34″N 2°46′06″E
- Country: Belgium
- Province: West Flanders
- Municipality: Middelkerke
- Source: NIS
- Postal code: 8434

Westende is a town in Flanders, one of the three regions of Belgium, and in the Flemish province of West Flanders. It lies on the Belgian coast, also called the Flemish coast. It used to be the far west (West-ende: Dutch for west-end) of the island Testerep which lay along the Belgian coast.
