= Ostend =

Municipality in West Flanders, Belgium

Ostend: Oostende (Dutch); Ostende (West Flemish); Ostende (French)
- City and municipality
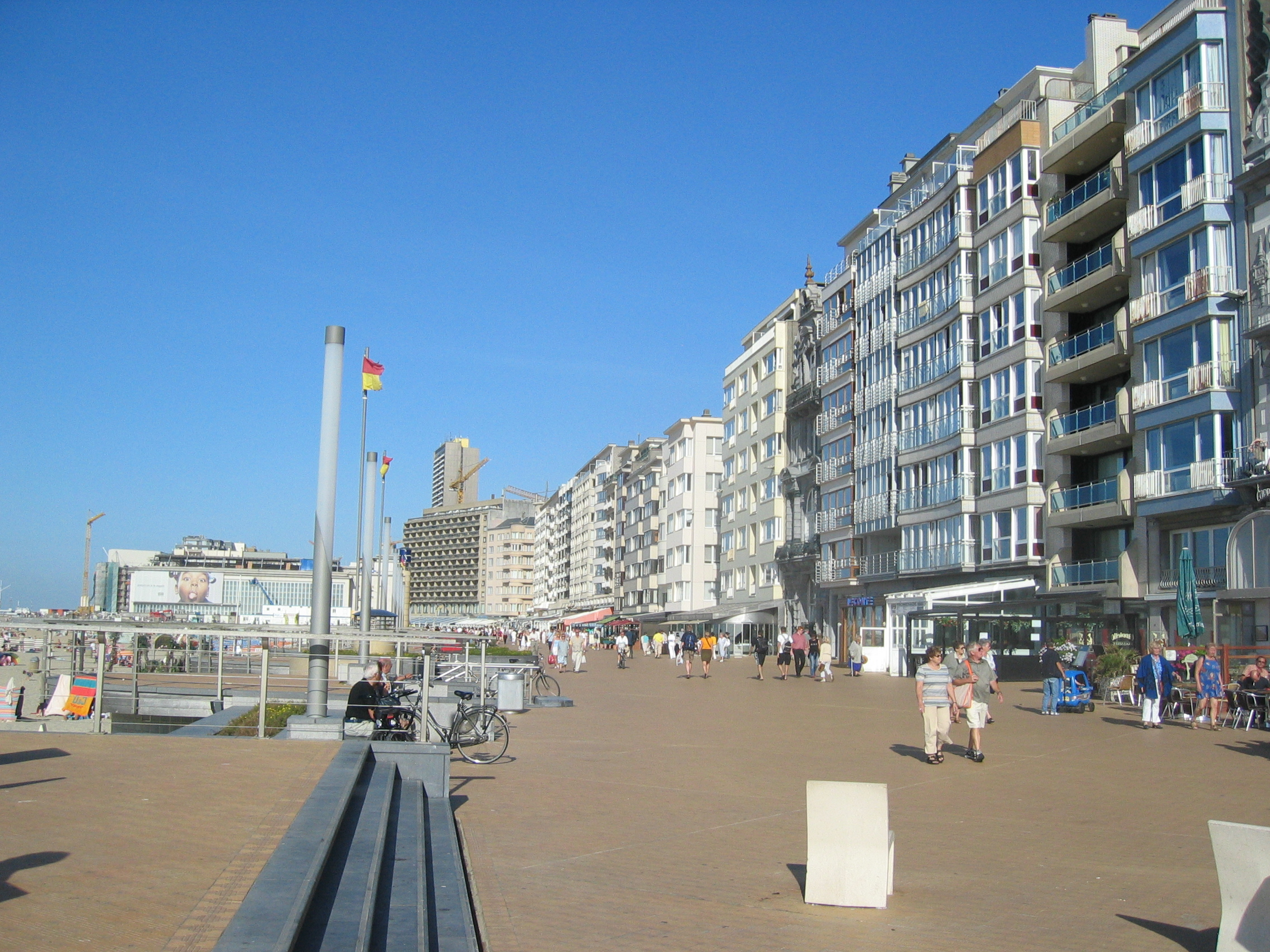
- Promenade at Ostend seaside

- Flag Coat of arms

- Location of Ostend in West Flanders
- Interactive map of Ostend
- Location in Belgium
- Coordinates: 51°13′33″N 02°55′10″E
- Country: Belgium
- Community: Flemish Community
- Region: Flemish Region
- Province: West Flanders
- Arrondissement: Ostend

Government
  - Mayor: John Crombez (Vooruit)
  - Governing parties: Open VLD, N-VA, Groen, CD&V

Area
  - Total: 40.95 km^{2} (15.81 sq mi)

Population (2022-01-01)
  - Total: 71,557
  - Density: 1,747/km^{2} (4,526/sq mi)
- Postal codes: 8400
- NIS code: 35013
- Area codes: 059
- Website: www.oostende.be

Ostend (/ɒstˈɛnd/ ost-END; Dutch: Oostende [oːstˈɛndə]; West Flemish: Ostende; French: Ostende [ɔstɑ̃d]; lit. 'East End') is a coastal city and municipality in the province of West Flanders in the Flemish Region of Belgium. It comprises the boroughs of Mariakerke, Raversijde, Stene and Zandvoorde, and the city of Ostend proper – the largest on the Belgian coast.

== Coat of Arms ==
The city's coat of arms derives from the coat of arms of the first governor of Ostend, the knight Woutre Van Ghent. Woutre Van Ghent adopted the suffix "MAN" in 1229, coming to style himself as Woutreman I Van Ghent (in French he appears as Watreman de Gand). Woutreman Van Ghent (1214–1261) was the youngest son of Zeger II, Viscount of Ghent and Petronella of Coutrai, and therefore the great-grandson of William of Ypres (legitimized son of Philip of Ypres and grandson of Robert I, Count of Flanders) and of Stephanie of Vienne (Burgundy).

== History ==
=== Middle Ages ===
In the Early Middle Ages, Ostend was a small village built on the east-end (oost-einde) of an island (originally called Testerep) between the North Sea and a beach lake. Although small, the village rose to the status of "town" around 1265, when the inhabitants were allowed to hold a market and to build a market hall.

The main source of income for the inhabitants was fishing. The North Sea coastline has always been rather unstable due to the power of the water. In 1395 the inhabitants decided to build a new Ostend behind large dikes and further away from the always-threatening sea.

=== 15th–18th centuries ===
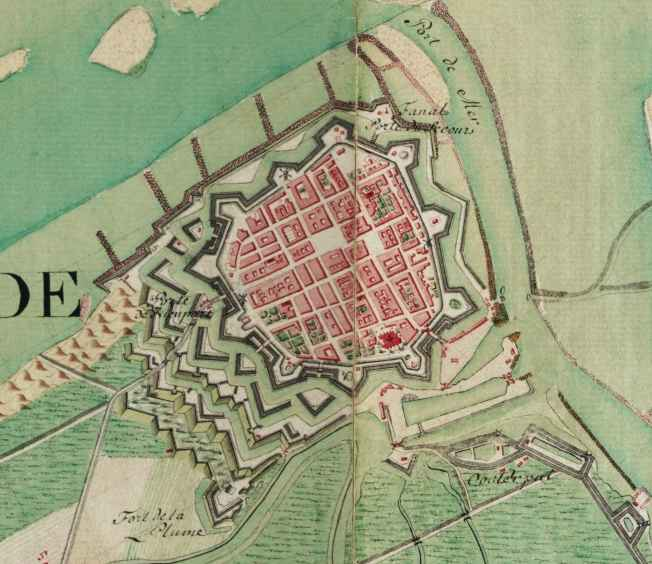
Ostend on the Ferraris map (around 1775)

St Petrus and St Paulus Church

The strategic position on the North Sea coast had major advantages for Ostend as a harbour but also proved to be a source of trouble. The town was frequently taken, ravaged, ransacked and destroyed by conquering armies. The Dutch rebels, the Geuzen, took control of the town. The Siege of Ostend, 1601 to 1604, of which it was said that "the Spanish assailed the unassailable and the Dutch defended the indefensible", cost a combined total of more than 80,000 dead or wounded, making it the single bloodiest battle of the Eighty Years' War. This shocking event set in motion negotiations that led to a truce several years later. When the truce broke down, it became a Dunkirker base.

After this era, Ostend was turned into a harbour of some importance. In 1722, the Dutch again closed off the entrance to the world's biggest harbour of Antwerp, the Westerschelde. Therefore, Ostend rose in importance because the town provided an alternative exit to the sea. The Belgium Austriacum had become part of the Austrian Empire. The Austrian Emperor Charles VI granted the town a trade monopoly with Africa and the East Indies. The Ostend Company was allowed to found colonies overseas. However, in 1727 the Ostend Company was dissolved due to Dutch and British diplomatic pressure.

There was a Jewish community in Ostend, which was first noted in the 16th century.

=== 19th century ===
On 19 September 1826, the local artillery magazine exploded. At least 20 people were killed and a further 200 injured. The affluent quarter of d'Hargras was levelled and scarcely a building in the city escaped damage. Disease followed the devastation leading to further deaths.

The harbour of Ostend continued to expand because the harbour dock, as well as the traffic connections with the hinterland, were improved. In 1838, a railway connection with Brussels was constructed. Ostend became a transit harbour to England in 1846 when the first ferry sailed to Dover. An October 1854 meeting of American envoys led to the Ostend Manifesto. Important for the image of the town was the attention it started to receive from the Belgian kings Leopold I and Leopold II. Both monarchs liked to spend their holidays in Ostend. Important monuments and villas were built to please the Royal Family, including the Hippodrome Wellington horse racing track and the Royal Galleries. The rest of aristocratic Belgium followed and soon Ostend became known as "the queen of the Belgian sea-side resorts".

In 1866, Ostend was the venue for a crucial meeting of exiled Spanish Liberals and Republicans which laid the framework, the Pact of Ostend, for a major uprising in their country, culminating in Spain's Glorious Revolution two years later.

=== 20th century ===
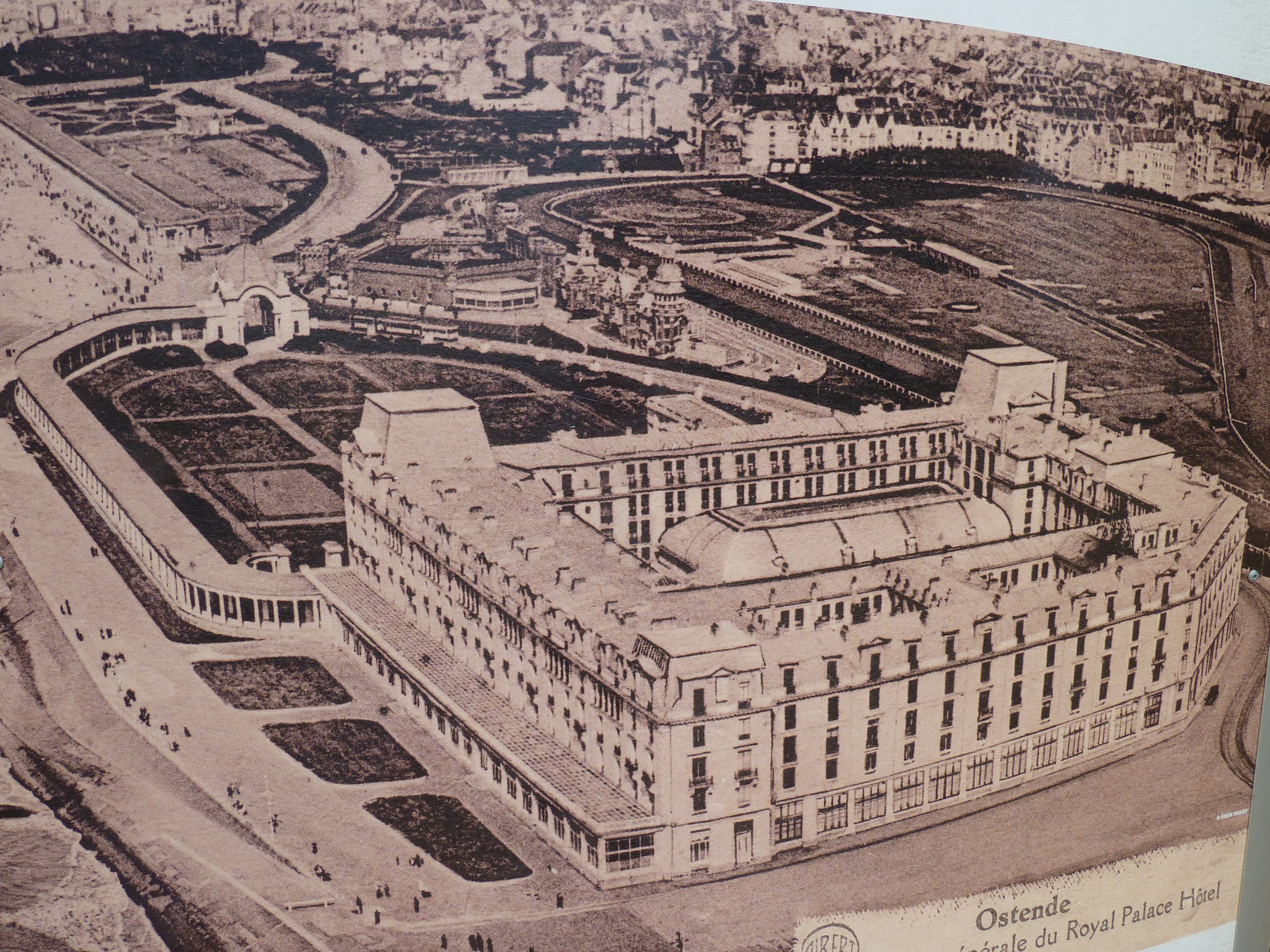
Royal Palace Hotel (1914)

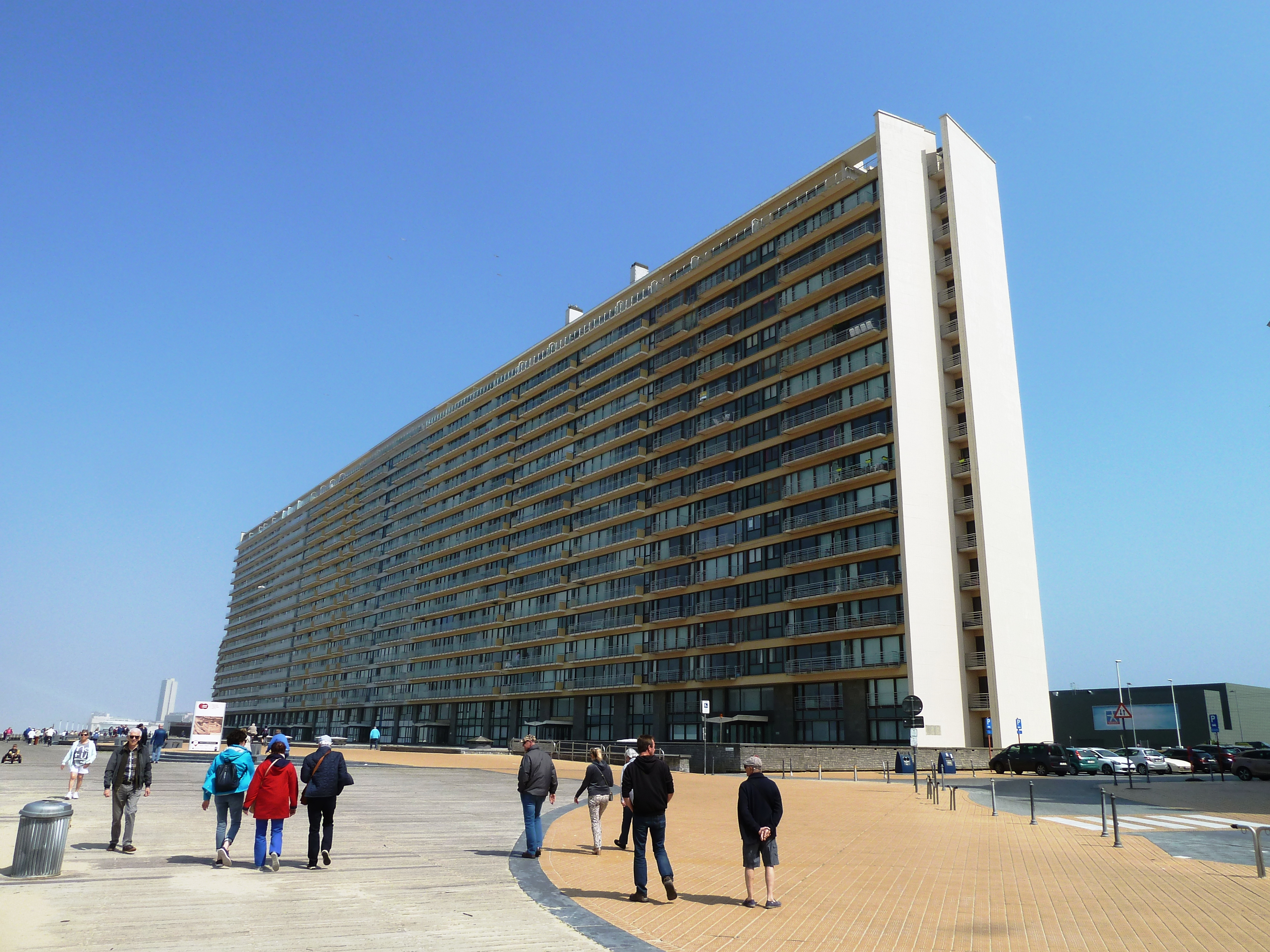
Residentie Royal Palace (1975)

The two world wars proved to be disastrous for Ostend. The Belle Époque-era ended for the city in 1914 at the start of World War I when the Germans placed anti-aircraft batteries along Fort Napoleon and in the dunes along the Onze-Lieve-Vrouw-ter-Duinenkerk. During the German invasion of Belgium, Ostend along with Zeebrugge fell to the Germans without fighting on October 15, after which they stationed German submarines and other light naval forces in the city for much of the duration of World War I. Near the end of the war, the British Royal Navy tried to block Ostend twice with a naval blockade: the first raid took place on 23 April 1918, the second raid on 9 May 1918.

Between the wars, the town hosted all of the sailing events for the 1920 Summer Olympics for Antwerp. Only the finals of the 12 foot dinghy took place in Amsterdam. Ostend also hosted the polo events.

Ostend was once again a target at the start of World War II by both the Axis and Allied powers. The city would face repeated bombing raids by the Luftwaffe during the German invasion of Belgium on 10 May 1940, destroying significant parts of the historic coastline in the process. As early as 13 and 15 May, German bombs fell in the evening and night around Fort Napoleon and the water tower in the Vuurtorenwijk. On the 17th of May more bombs were dropped, with the freight station on the Istanbul quay being hit as a result. Around this time, the fear that Ostend would be bombed heavily by the Luftwaffe started to form, prompting many to flee the city by boat to England or France. The 21st of May was the scene of another air raid on Ostend, causing big fires as a result. One of such fires was at Hotel Splendid. The beach hotel of Ostend was hit by three German bombs on the 24th of May. The hotel was used as a hospital and killed over 50 Belgian soldiers after a massive fire broke out. The next day, the 25 May, another German bombing raid was carried out. At around 08:00 in the morning, incindiary and brisance bombs were dropped on the city, causing around three to four fires and killing 12 civilians as a result. The last bombing raid on the 27th of May ended up completely destroying the city hall of Ostend at the Wapenplein as well as the city archive and paintings created by James Ensor and Léon Spilliaert. In total, the bombing raids between the 21 and 27 May caused over 75 deaths of civilians and soldiers in the city. After the German bombings stopped in May 1940, Allied bombings started in June of that year. The Royal Air Force repeatedly targeted the city due to British fears that Germany would use the strategic coastal city for a German invasion of England. As a result, more civilians died and even more of the coastline and inner city, as well as the harbour, ended up being damaged or destroyed.

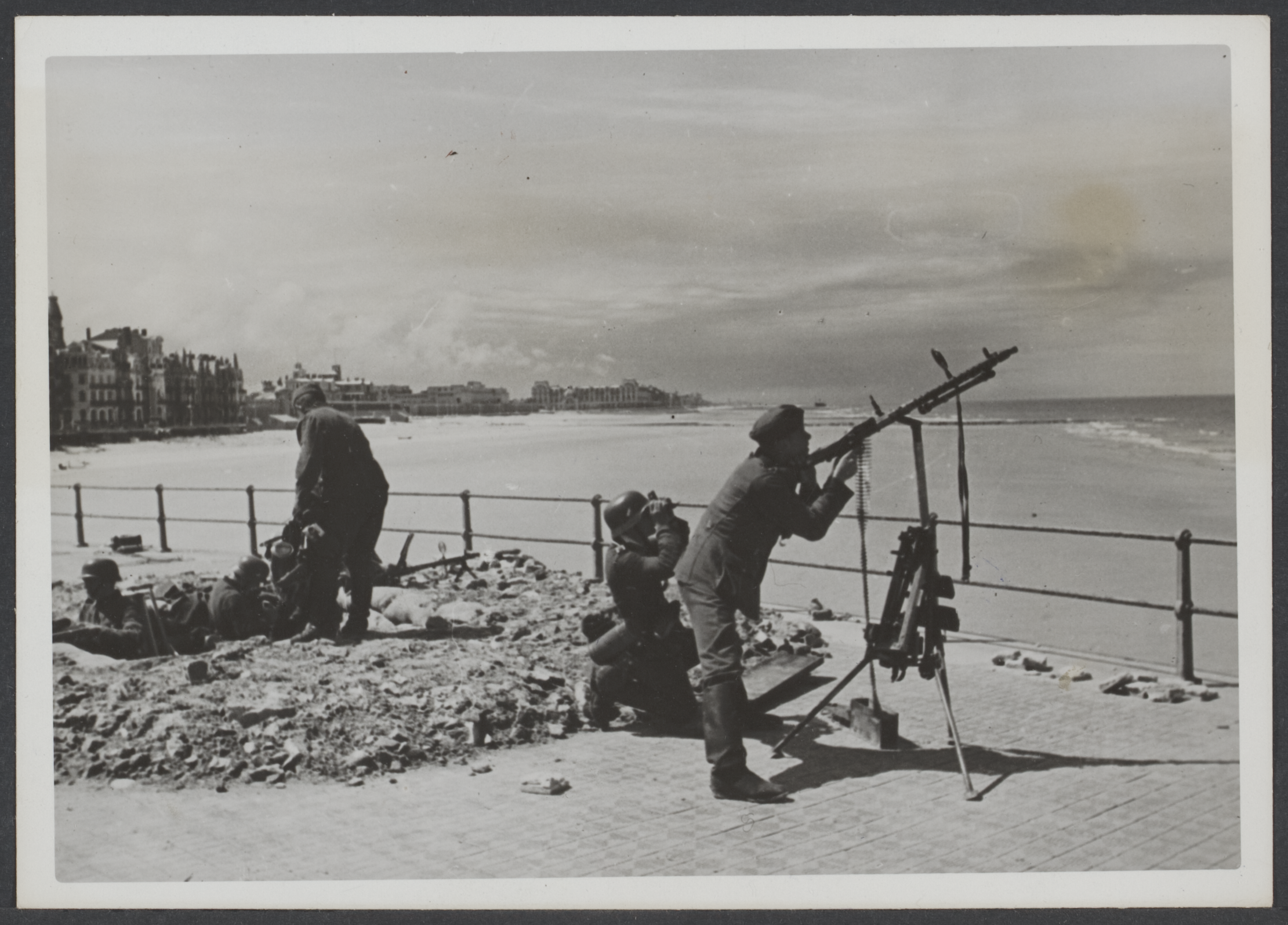
German machine gunner firing at Allied planes in front of the Kursaal in June 1940

After the successful invasion of Belgium and the occupation, the Germans decided to demolish the remnants of the Kursaal and build a bunker underneath its remains. They also decided to enact the massive Atlantic Wall in the city and heavily reinforced and defended it due to its strategic location. The city was liberated by Canadian troops on 8 September 1944. Ultimately, the many German and British raids on Ostend ended up destroying many historic houses as well as iconic buildings along the coast as well as in the inner city like the city hall, Kursaal, post office and Hippodrome Wellington. No other Belgian city was bombed as often and faced as much destruction as Ostend: 407 Allied bombs were dropped on the city, making Ostend the most bombed city in Belgium. Because of this, many of the damaged houses and public buildings were left standing in the city for years. It was ultimately decided that the remnants of said buildings, such as civilian houses and luxury hotels, would be torn down instead of restored after the war and reconstructed with modernist apartment blocs due to an increasing demand in these types of buildings from the tourist sector.

=== 21st century ===
Ostend's Winter in the Park festival draws more than 600,000 people to the seaside city. During December, Ostend's Christmas market, one of the largest in Europe, features vendors and food sellers along with ice skating, music and other events. A light-show tunnel on one of the major shopping streets attracts and amuses visitors from all over Belgium, Europe and beyond.

== Demographics ==
Group of origin, 2025	Number	%
Belgians with Belgian background	50,351	69.1%
People with foreign background	22,466	30.9%
Neighbouring country	2,997	4.1%
EU27 (excluding neighbouring country)	2,703	3.7%
Outside EU27	16,766	23.0%
Total	72,817	100%

== Sights ==
Ostend is known for its sea-side esplanade, including the Royal Galleries of Ostend, pier, and fine-sand beaches. Ostend is visited by many day-trippers heading to the beaches, especially during July and August. Tourists from inland Belgium and from abroad mostly arrive by train (day trips) and head for the closest beach area, the Klein Strand, located next to the pier. The locals and other residents in Belgium usually occupy the larger beach (het Groot Strand).

Near the beach is a well-preserved section of the fortified Atlantic Wall, open to the public as the Atlantic Wall Open Air Museum located in Raversijde. One can walk through the streets around Het Vissersplein. At certain times, there are markets in the neighbourhood streets and in the summer the Vissersplein has music festivals. The Vissersplein (Bonenstraat/Kadzandstraat) is a car free zone with many brasseries where patrons can sit outside and have a drink. Towards the port side there are many little fish outlets, and beyond that the ferries can be observed docking.

Notable sites include:

- the Casino and Fort Napoleon
- Oostende railway station
- The Mercator, the ex–training sailing ship for Belgian merchant navy officers, now open to the public to view
- Hippodrome Wellington, horse racing venue
- Residentie Royal Ascot
- Ernest Feysplein
- St Petrus and St Paulus Church, Ostend (Sint-Petrus-en-Pauluskerk), built in Neo Gothic style
- King Leopold II statue
- Synagoge Oostende
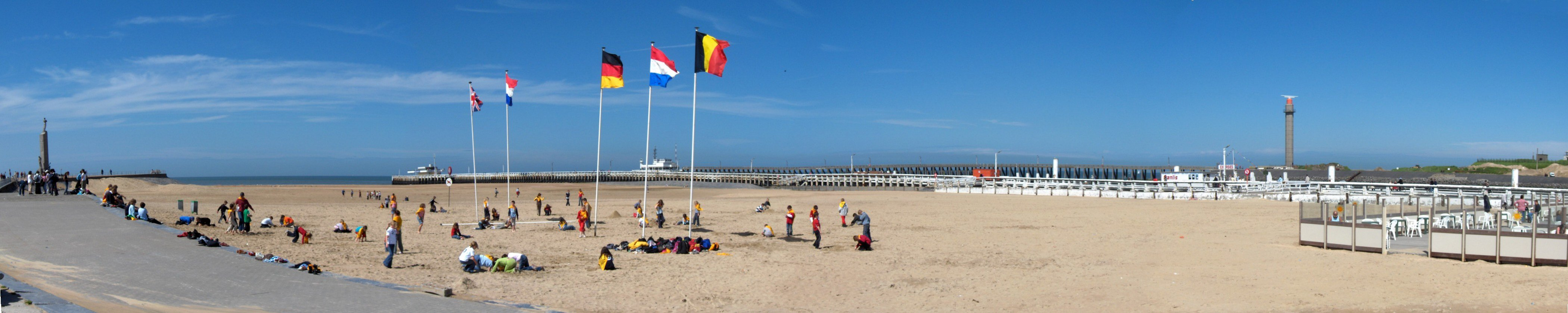
Ostend beach and the promenade pier – panoramic view

== Museums ==
The James Ensor museum can be visited in the house where the artist lived from 1917 until 1949.

The Mu.Zee (merged from the Provinciaal Museum voor de Moderne Kunst and the Museum voor Schone Kunsten) is the museum of modern art (from the 1830s to the present) and displays works of noted local painters such as James Ensor, Leon Spilliaert, Constant Permeke and the revolutionary post-war Belgian COBRA movement amongst others.

== Climate ==
Ostend has a maritime temperate climate, influenced by winds from the North Sea, making summers cooler than inland Europe. 24-hour average temperatures below the freezing point is a rare occurrence. According to the Köppen Climate Classification system, Ostend has a marine west coast climate, abbreviated "Cfb" on climate maps.

Climate data for Ostend (1991–2020 normals, extremes since 1973)
Month	Jan	Feb	Mar	Apr	May	Jun	Jul	Aug	Sep	Oct	Nov	Dec	Year
Record high °C (°F)	14.0 (57.2)	17.8 (64.0)	23.7 (74.7)	25.6 (78.1)	31.8 (89.2)	32.9 (91.2)	37.8 (100.0)	35.6 (96.1)	32.1 (89.8)	26.9 (80.4)	19.2 (66.6)	15.0 (59.0)	37.8 (100.0)
Mean daily maximum °C (°F)	6.8 (44.2)	7.5 (45.5)	10.2 (50.4)	13.5 (56.3)	16.6 (61.9)	19.3 (66.7)	21.5 (70.7)	21.9 (71.4)	19.3 (66.7)	15.1 (59.2)	10.5 (50.9)	7.3 (45.1)	14.1 (57.4)
Daily mean °C (°F)	4.1 (39.4)	4.4 (39.9)	6.5 (43.7)	9.2 (48.6)	12.6 (54.7)	15.4 (59.7)	17.4 (63.3)	17.6 (63.7)	15.0 (59.0)	11.4 (52.5)	7.6 (45.7)	4.8 (40.6)	10.5 (50.9)
Mean daily minimum °C (°F)	1.4 (34.5)	1.3 (34.3)	2.9 (37.2)	4.8 (40.6)	8.6 (47.5)	11.5 (52.7)	13.4 (56.1)	13.2 (55.8)	10.7 (51.3)	7.8 (46.0)	4.7 (40.5)	2.2 (36.0)	6.9 (44.4)
Record low °C (°F)	−15.0 (5.0)	−12.3 (9.9)	−11.3 (11.7)	−4.9 (23.2)	−1.0 (30.2)	2.6 (36.7)	3.3 (37.9)	5.0 (41.0)	0.6 (33.1)	−5.4 (22.3)	−7.4 (18.7)	−11.0 (12.2)	−15.0 (5.0)
Average precipitation mm (inches)	62.1 (2.44)	56.2 (2.21)	47.3 (1.86)	40.6 (1.60)	53.9 (2.12)	62.5 (2.46)	67.6 (2.66)	83.6 (3.29)	74.0 (2.91)	79.7 (3.14)	87.6 (3.45)	85.8 (3.38)	800.9 (31.52)
Average precipitation days (≥ 1 mm)	11.9	10.5	9.5	8.3	9.0	9.0	9.3	9.7	9.8	12.1	13.5	13.7	126.3
Mean monthly sunshine hours	66	86	144	206	230	232	238	223	171	121	68	54	1,839
Source 1: Royal Meteorological Institute
Source 2: Infoclimat

== Transport ==
Ostend–Bruges International Airport located 5 km (3 miles) from Ostend is primarily a freight airport but offers passenger flights to leisure destinations in Southern Europe and Turkey. TUI fly Belgium has its headquarters in Ostend. TAAG Angola Airlines's Ostend offices are on the grounds of Ostend Airport.

The Ostend railway station is a major hub on the National Railway Company of Belgium network with frequent InterCity trains serving Brugge railway station, Gent-Sint-Pieters, Brussels South and Liège-Guillemins on Belgian railway line 50A. The Coast Tram connects Ostend with De Panne to the south and Knokke-Heist in the north.

Ostend formerly had busy ferry routes to Dover and Ramsgate, but the last of these services ended with the failure of TransEuropa Ferries in 2013.

== Gallery ==
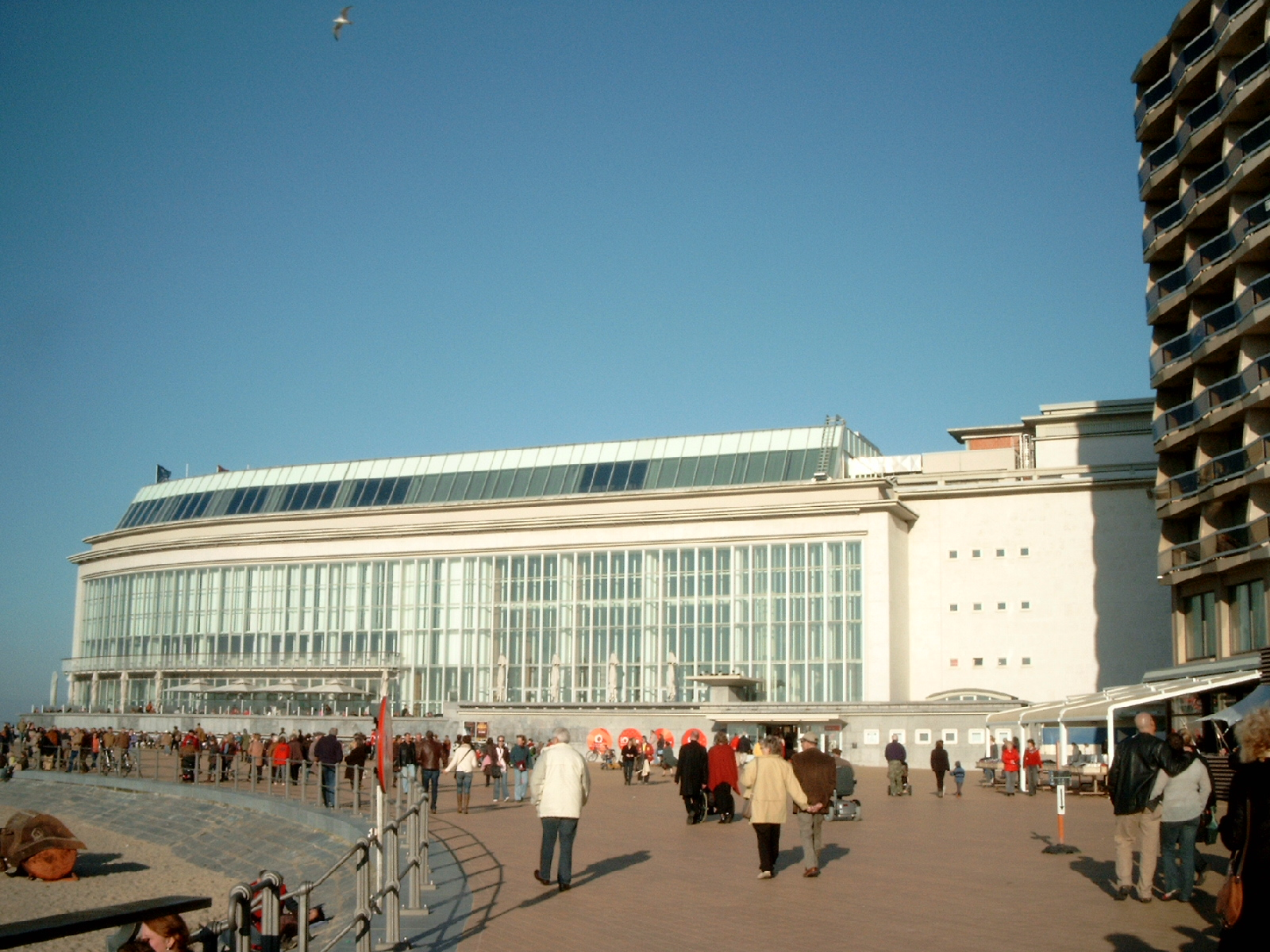
Casino Kursaal

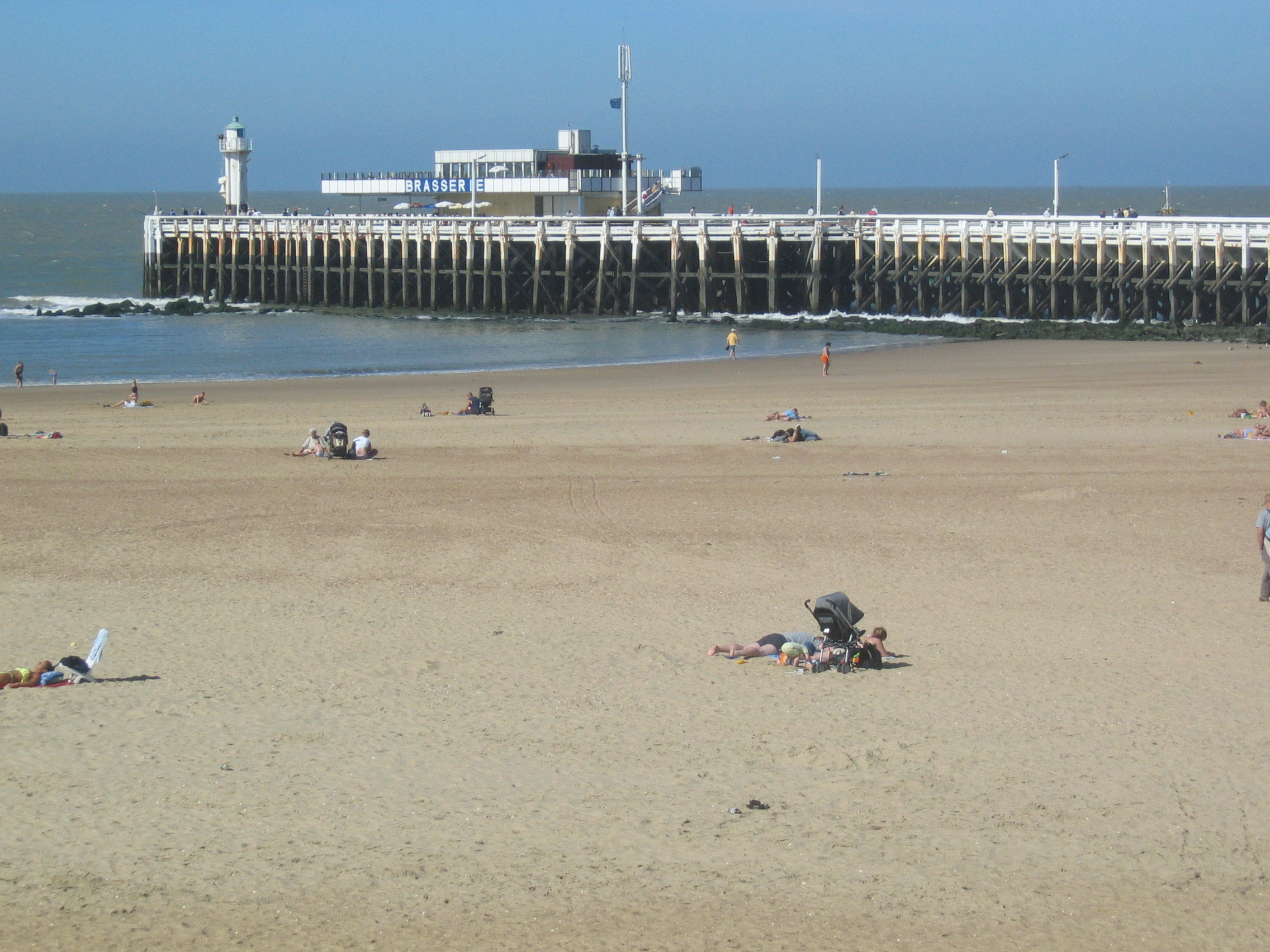
Pier

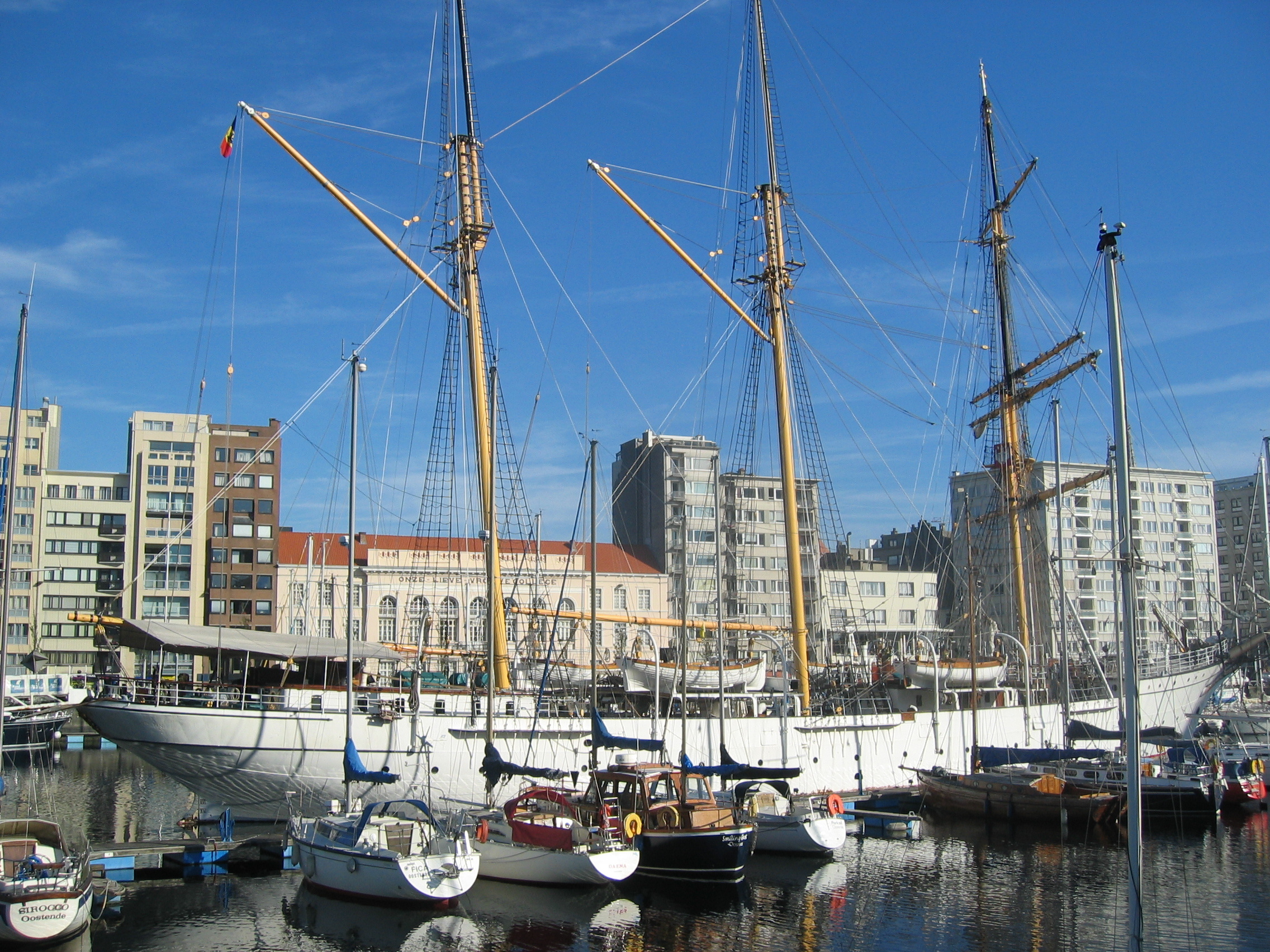
Museum-ship, the barquentine Mercator

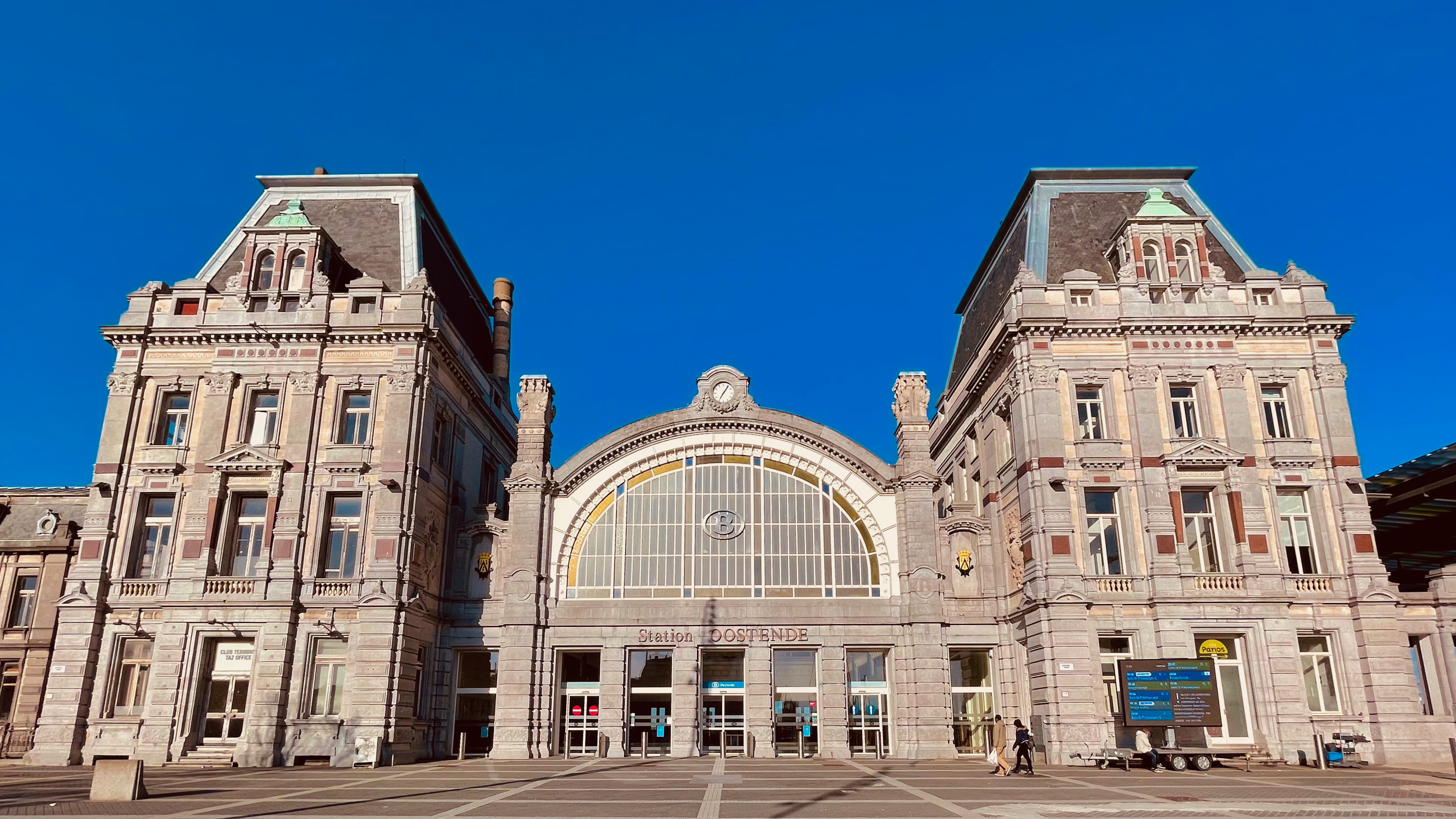
Oostende railway station

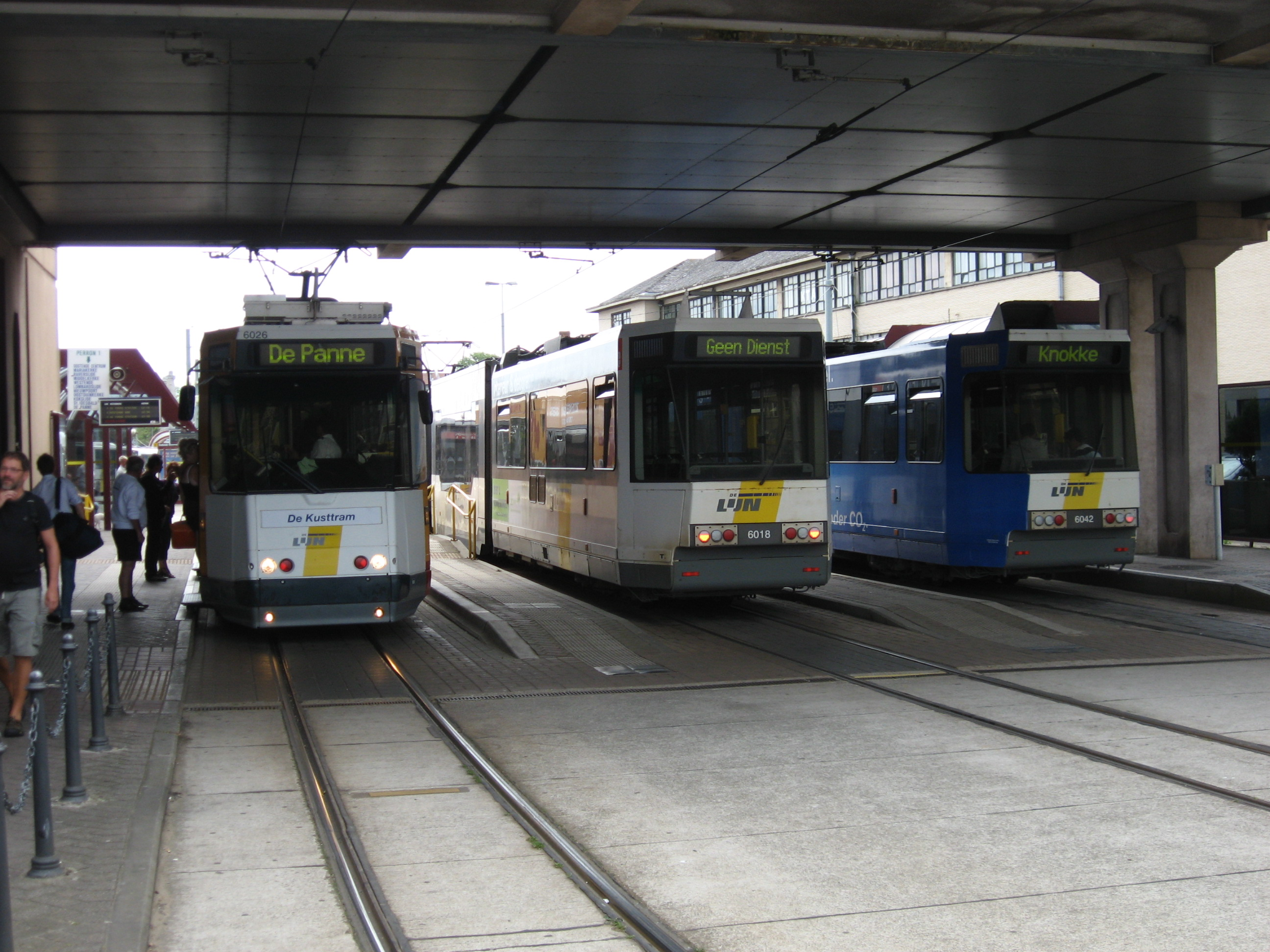
Tram station

Municipal park

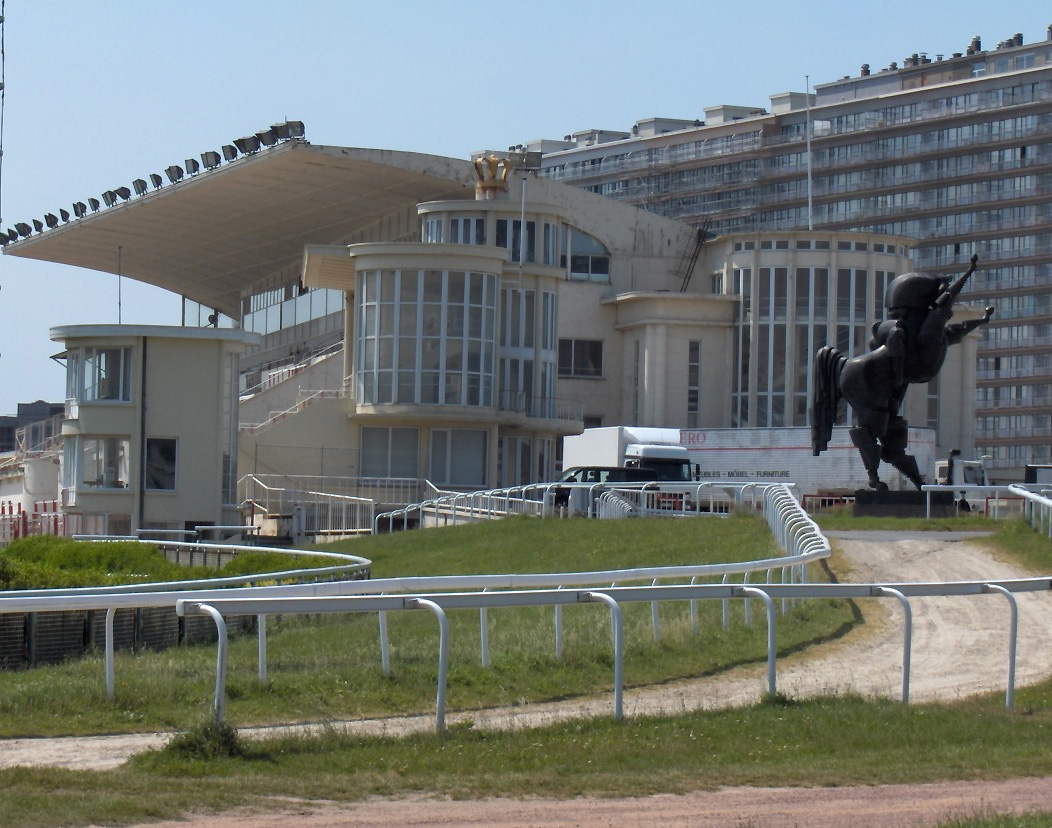
Hippodrome Wellington

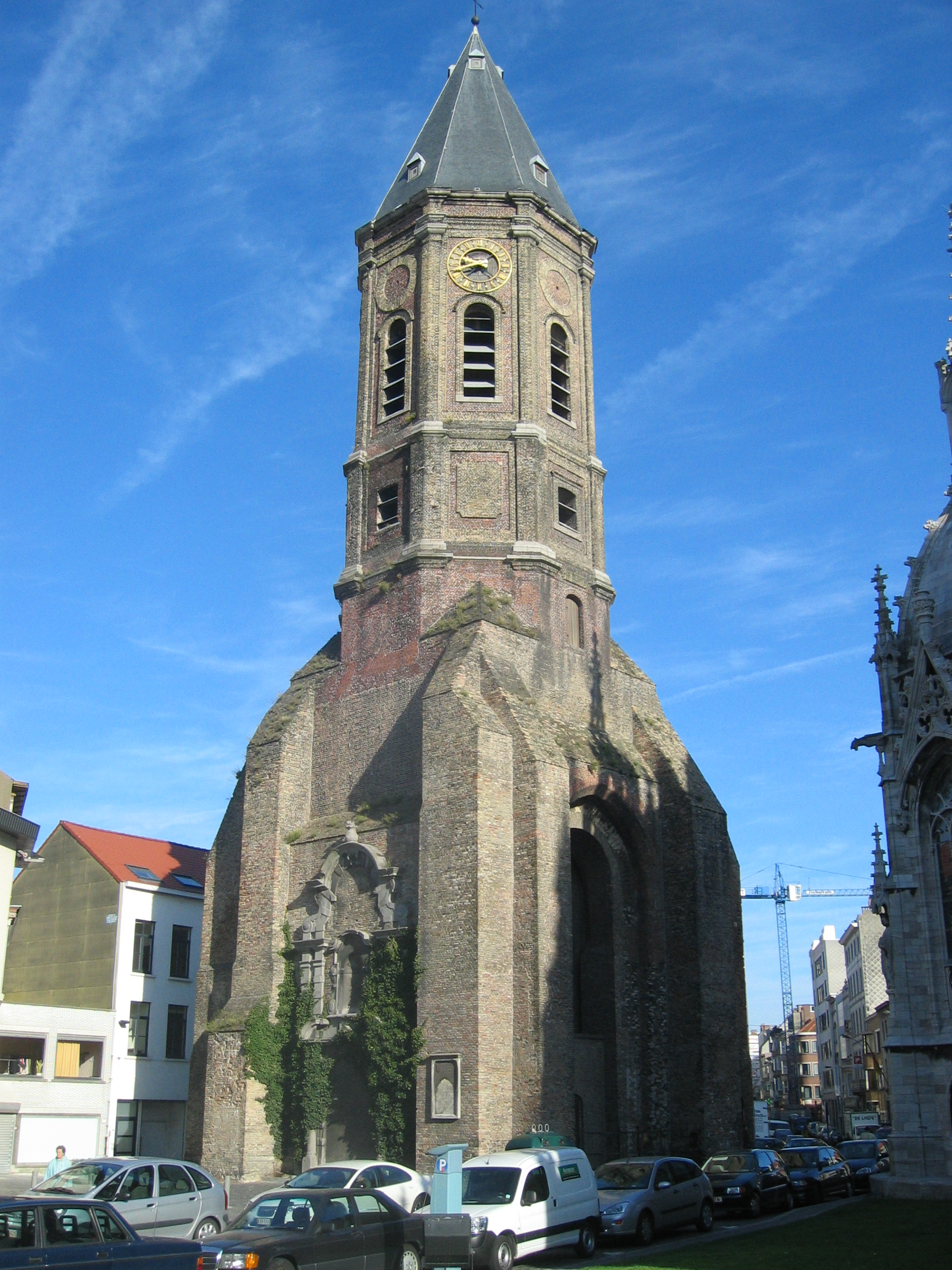
The Peperbusse, the tower of a burned down church

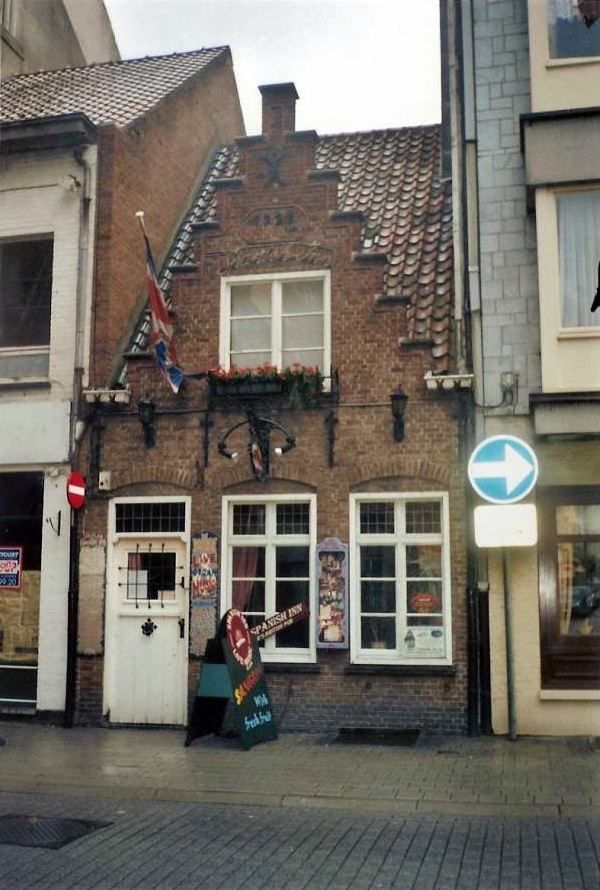
Fisherman's house from 1729 (Kapucijnenstraat)

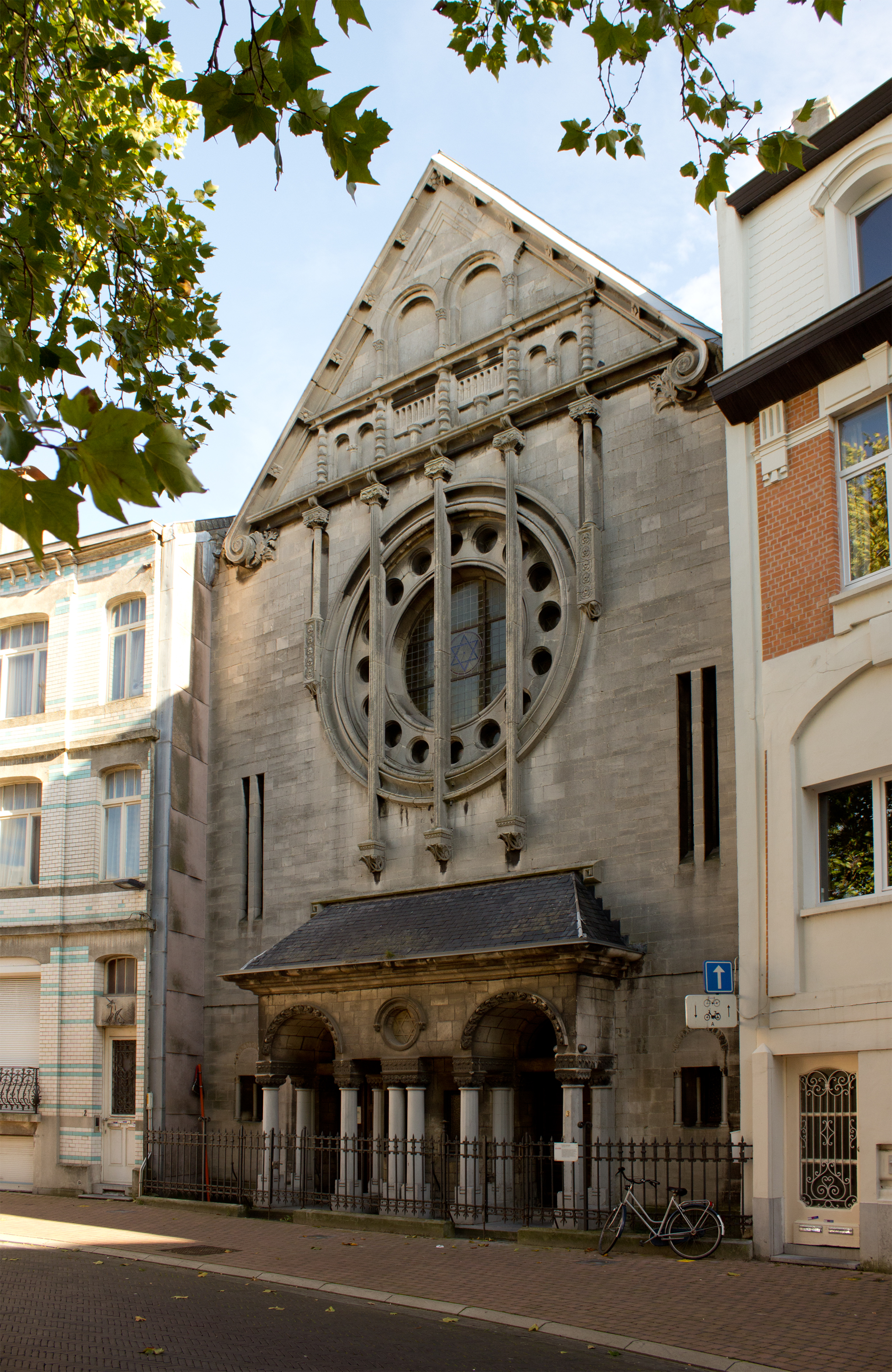
The Ostend Synagogue

== Twin towns – sister cities ==
Ostend is twinned with:

- Monaco, Monaco (1958)
- (The Gambia) Banjul, Gambia (2003)
- Dunavarsány, Hungary (2018)
- Ostende, Argentina (2021)

== Notable residents ==
References to these notable citizens of Ostend can be found on the oostende.be website.

- Lilian Baels, princess
- Auguste Marie Francois Beernaert, prime minister and Nobel Peace Prize recipient
- Alfred Belpaire, locomotive engineer
- Gerard Brackx, tourism
- John Crombez, politician
- Cesar De Paepe, syndicalist
- Celine Dept, Social influencer
- Alexis Deswaef, human rights lawyer
- Liza 'N' Eliaz, hardcore DJ
- James Ensor, painter
- Jelle Florizoone, actor
- Marvin Gaye, musician
- Johannes Gysius, historian
- Arno Hintjens, lead singer of TC Matic
- Karel Jonckheere, writer
- Mimi Lamote, businesswoman
- Stefaan Maene, backstroke swimmer
- Hubert Minnebo, sculptor
- Pieter Mulier, fashion designer
- Marie-José of Belgium, princess, then last queen of Italy
- Divock Origi, footballer (born here but grew up elsewhere)
- Louise of Orléans, first queen of the Belgians
- Constant Permeke, expressionist painter
- Roger Remaut, painter
- Raoul Servais, filmmaker
- Gustaaf Sorel, painter
- Leon Spilliaert, painter
- Henri Storck, author, filmmaker, and documentarian
- Robert Triffin, economist
- Robert Van De Walle, judoka
- Bart van den Bossche, singer, actor, and radio/TV presenter
- Peter Van Heirseele (Herr Seele), cartoonist (Cowboy Henk), painter and performer
- Johan Vande Lanotte, politician
- Julie Vanloo, WNBA point guard
- Rudolf Vanmoerkerke, businessman
- Katrien Vermeire, artist

== Sport clubs ==
- BC Oostende (basketball)
- Hermes Volley Oostende (volleyball)
- KV Diksmuide-Oostende (formerly K.V. Oostende) (football)
- Wellington Golf Oostende (golf)

== In popular culture ==
Ostend has been used as a film location by numerous directors. The movies Place Vendôme with Catherine Deneuve; Daughters of Darkness with Delphine Seyrig as Countess Bathory; Armaguedon with Alain Delon; Camping Cosmos with Lolo Ferrari; and Ex Drummer, based on the novel by Herman Brusselmans; were partially shot in Ostend.

The comic Le Bal du rat mort, about a dreadful invasion of rats, is set in Ostend.

== See also ==
- Greenbridge science park
- Ostend Manifesto
- Port of Ostend
