= Gustaaf Sorel =

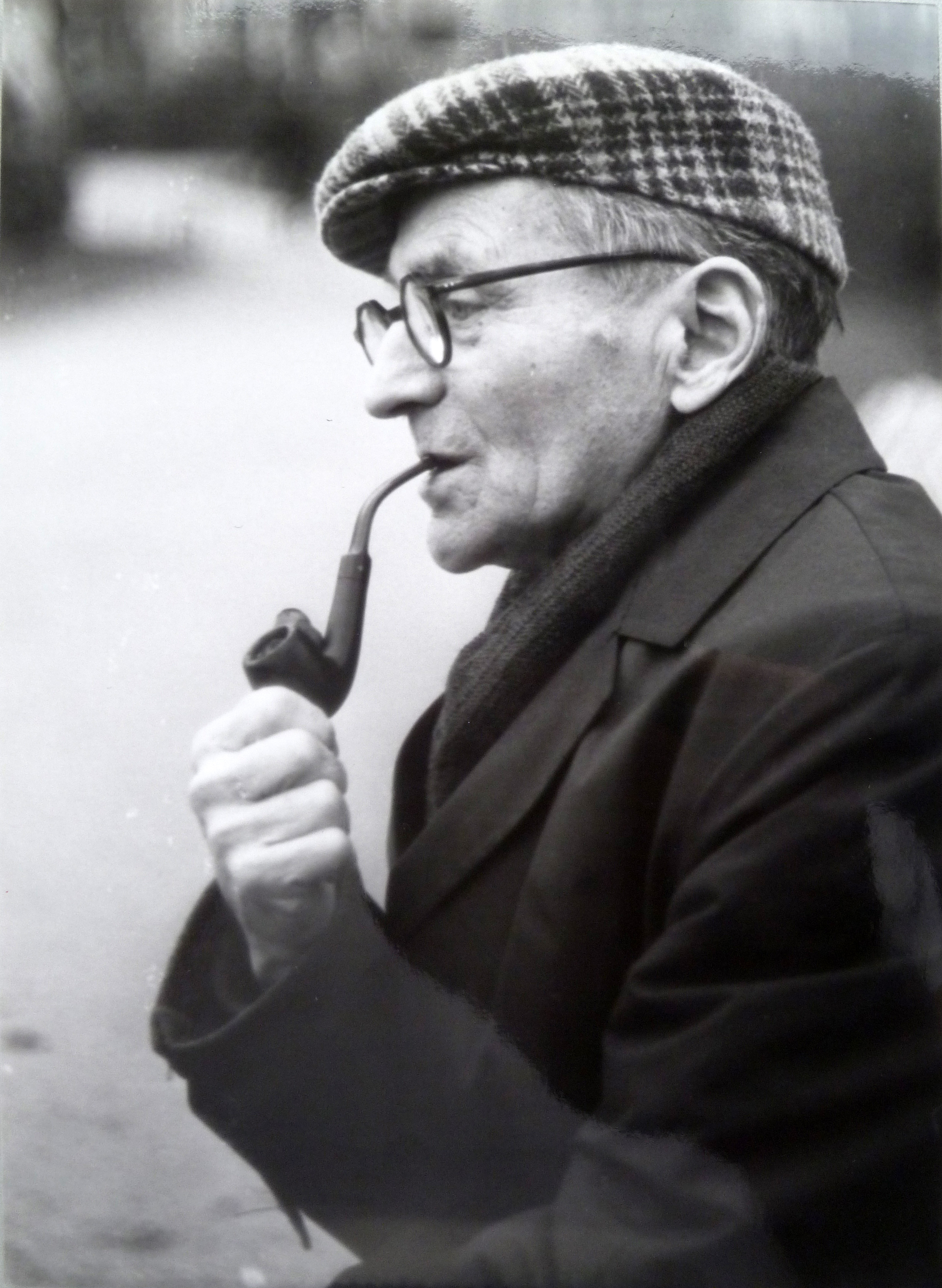
- Born: 17 January 1905; Ostend, Belgium
- Died: 14 May 1981 (aged 76); Ostend, Belgium
- Style: Expressionism, Cubism, Constructivism
- Awards: Prijs van het Oostends Kursaal (1937), Prix Thorlet de l’Académie Française (1954), Silver medal of the city of Paris (1954)

Gustaaf Sorel (17 January 1905, in Ostend – 14 May 1981, in Ostend) was a Belgian painter and draughtsman known for his representations of gloomy people and bleak street sights.

Sorel depicted his folkish surroundings with loose and fluid line work of his own synthetic painting method. He underwent several figurative influences like expressionism, cubism and constructivism, but, mostly stubbornly pursued his own style.

His city and street depictions with ashen facades radiate the oppressive sadness of the abandoned streets and empty stalls, of the city and her inhabitants. He had an obsession for a secretive, pressing silence, but even in those dark corners, there is no anxiety-inducing mood.

Usually a soft light radiates from a window, door or gate. a play of the light by which the mood becomes more intense and gives rise to many contrasts.

== Gallery ==
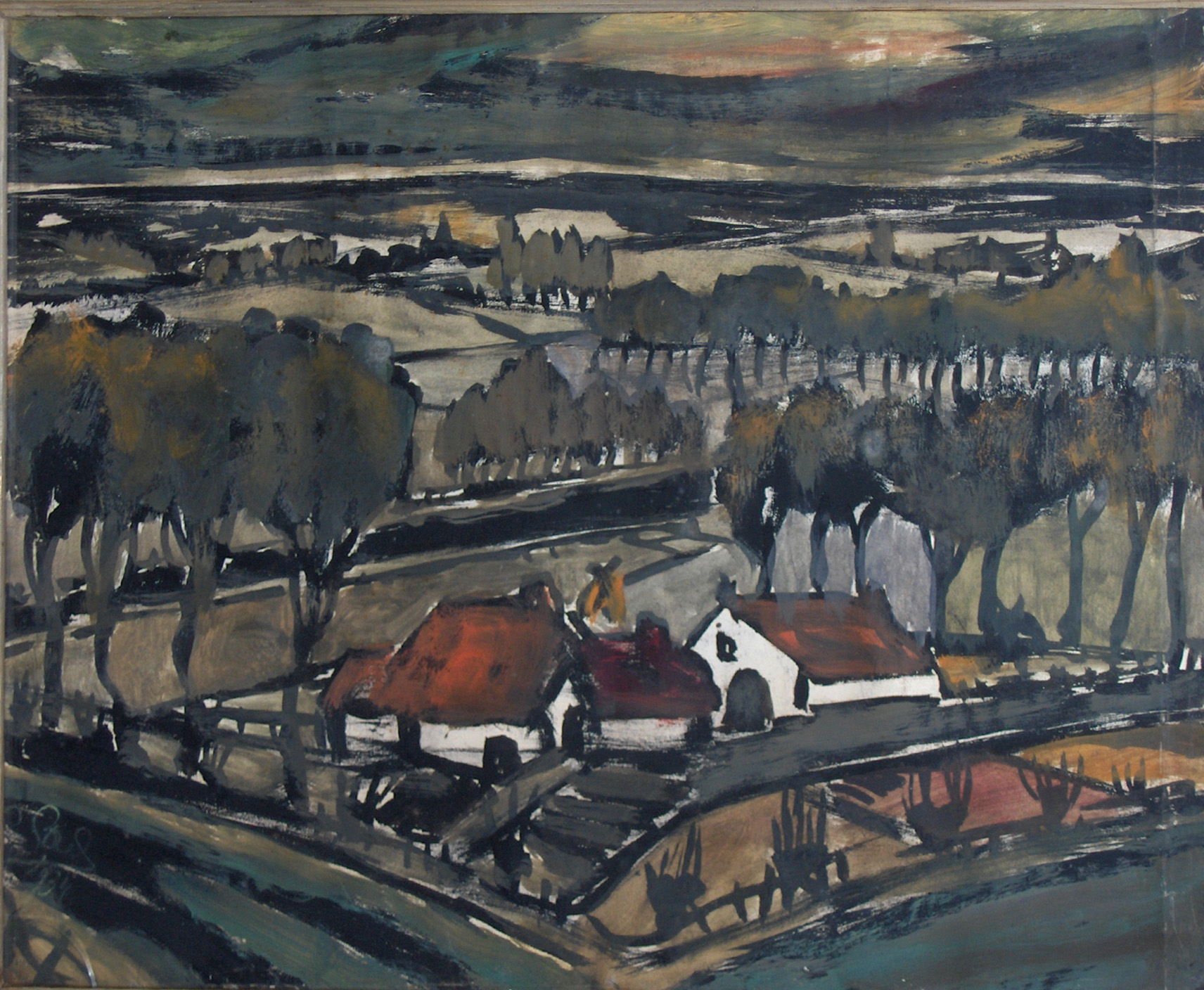
Panoramic Landscape, gouache on paper, c. 1936

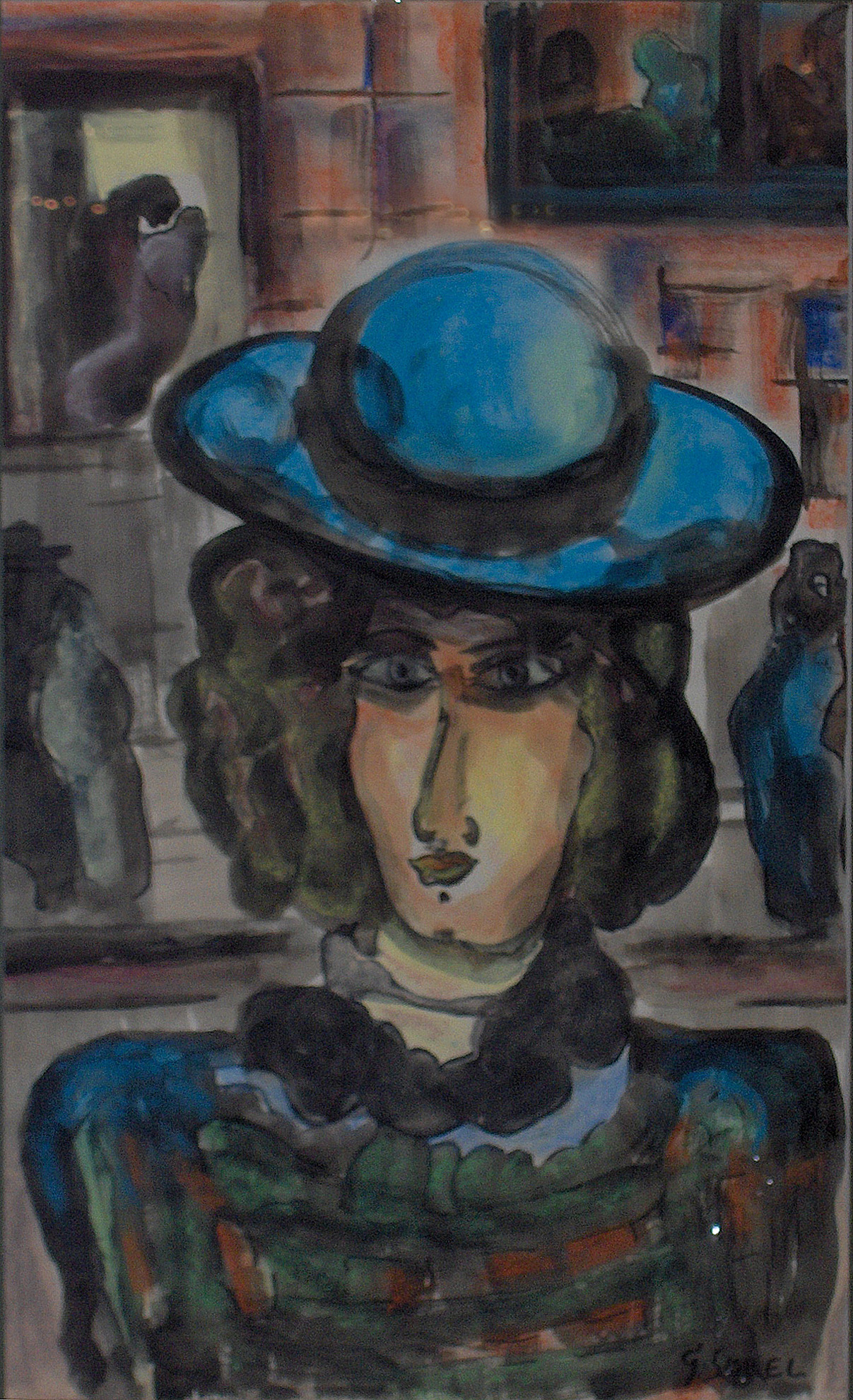
Lady with blue hat, watercolour

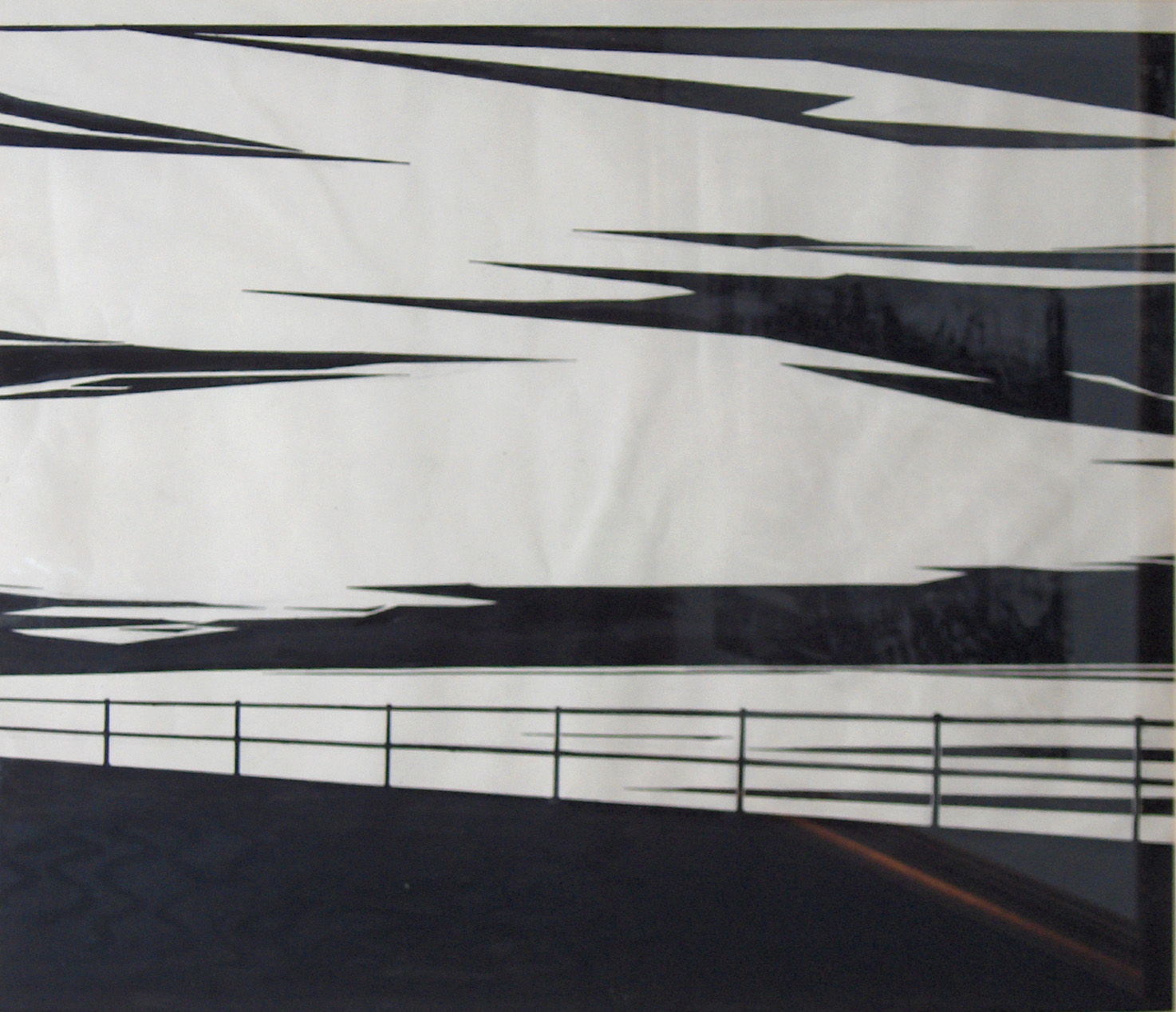
Seawall, India ink on paper, 1939

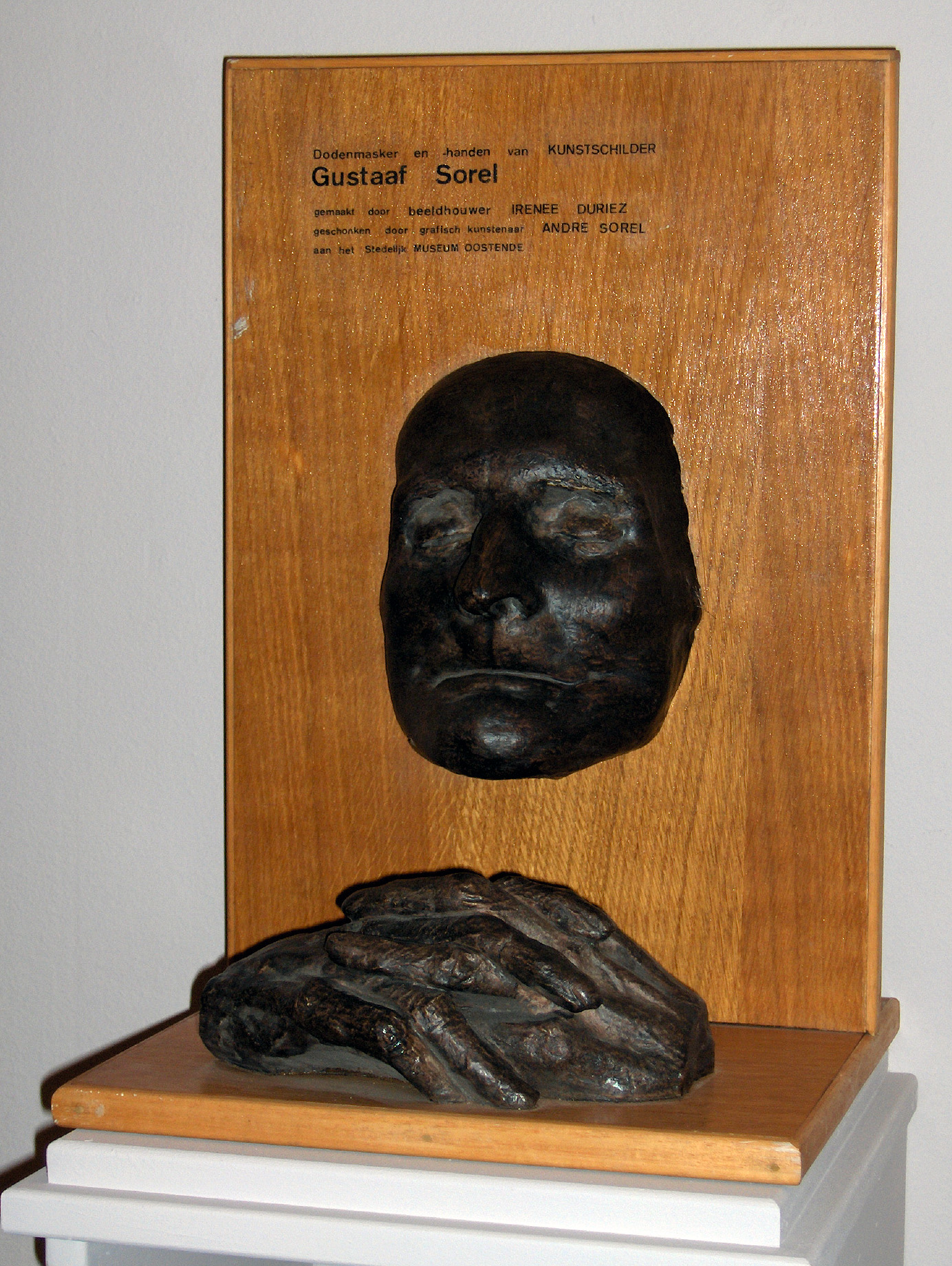
Death mask of Gustaaf Sorel by sculptor Irénée Duriez
