= Flemish Socialist Workers Party =

Belgian political party (historical)

Flemish Socialist Workers Party Vlaamse Socialistische Arbeiderspartij
- Abbreviation: VSAP
- Founded: July 1877
- Dissolved: September 1879
- Merged into: Belgian Socialist Party
- Ideology: Socialism
- Political position: Left-wing

The Flemish Socialist Workers Party (Dutch: Vlaamse Socialistische Arbeiderspartij, abbreviated VSAP) was a political party in Belgium. In May 1877 different organizations from Brussels, Antwerp and Ghent had assembled and decided to launch a joint party. VSAP was founded on a congress held in July 1877. The programme of VSAP was largely similar to the Gotha Programme of the Social Democratic Party of Germany.

Although VSAP established an organizational presence in different cities in the country, the party failed to make any decisive break-through.

A VSAP party congress, held in late 1878, discussed a merger with the Wallonian socialists. A merger went through in September 1879, with the formation of the Belgian Socialist Party.
