= Léon Spilliaert =

Belgian graphic artist and painter (1881–1946)

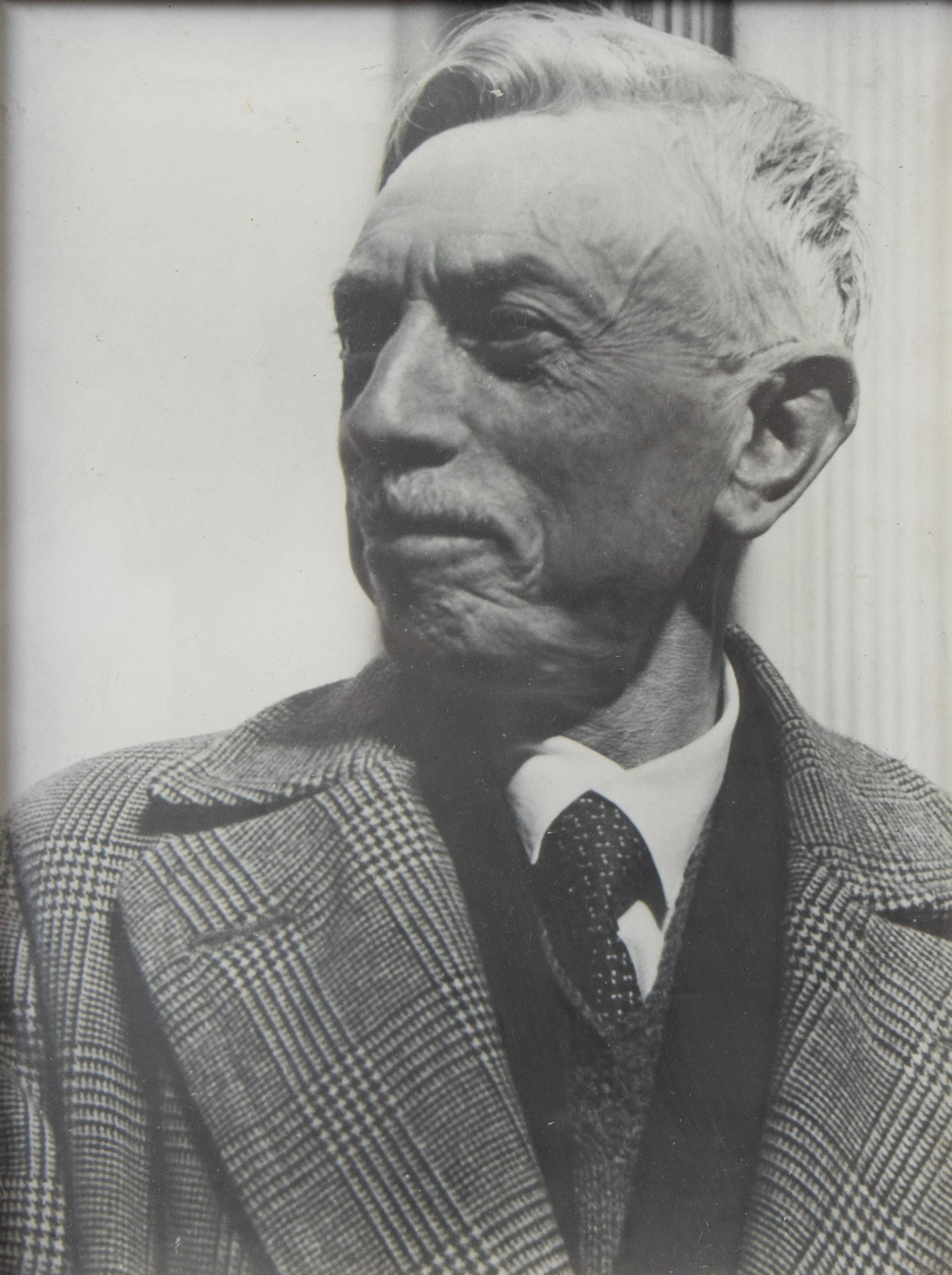
- Photographic portrait of Spilliaert, taken between 1930 and 1946
- Born: 28 July 1881; Ostend, Belgium
- Died: 23 November 1946 (aged 65); Ixelles, Belgium
- Known for: draughtsman, watercolorist, illustrator, Painter, graphic designer
- Movement: Symbolism, expressionism

Léon Spilliaert (also Leon Spilliaert; 28 July 1881 – 23 November 1946) was a Belgian draughtsman, illustrator, lithographer and painter. In his early career, he contributed to the development of symbolism in the visual arts in Belgium. He frequented the milieu of Belgian symbolist writers, of which Maurice Maeterlinck and Émile Verhaeren were the best known members. His work was inspired by visual and literary works by Edvard Munch, Fernand Khnopff, Edgar Allan Poe, Nietzsche and Lautréamont.

His subject matter was wide-ranging and included self-portraits, marines, forest views, portraits, still lifes, airships, dolls and genre scenes. He was a prolific illustrator of contemporary and historical literary works. His style is characterized by tenebrism and simplicity of form, and the bitter and mysterious expression of his characters and landscapes.

== Biography ==
Spilliaert was born in Ostend, the oldest of seven children of Léonard-Hubert Spilliaert, a perfumer, and his wife Léonie (née Jonckheere). From childhood, he displayed an interest in art and drawing. A prolific doodler and autodidact, he was predominantly a self-taught artist. Sickly and reclusive, he spent most of his youth sketching scenes of ordinary life and the Belgian countryside.

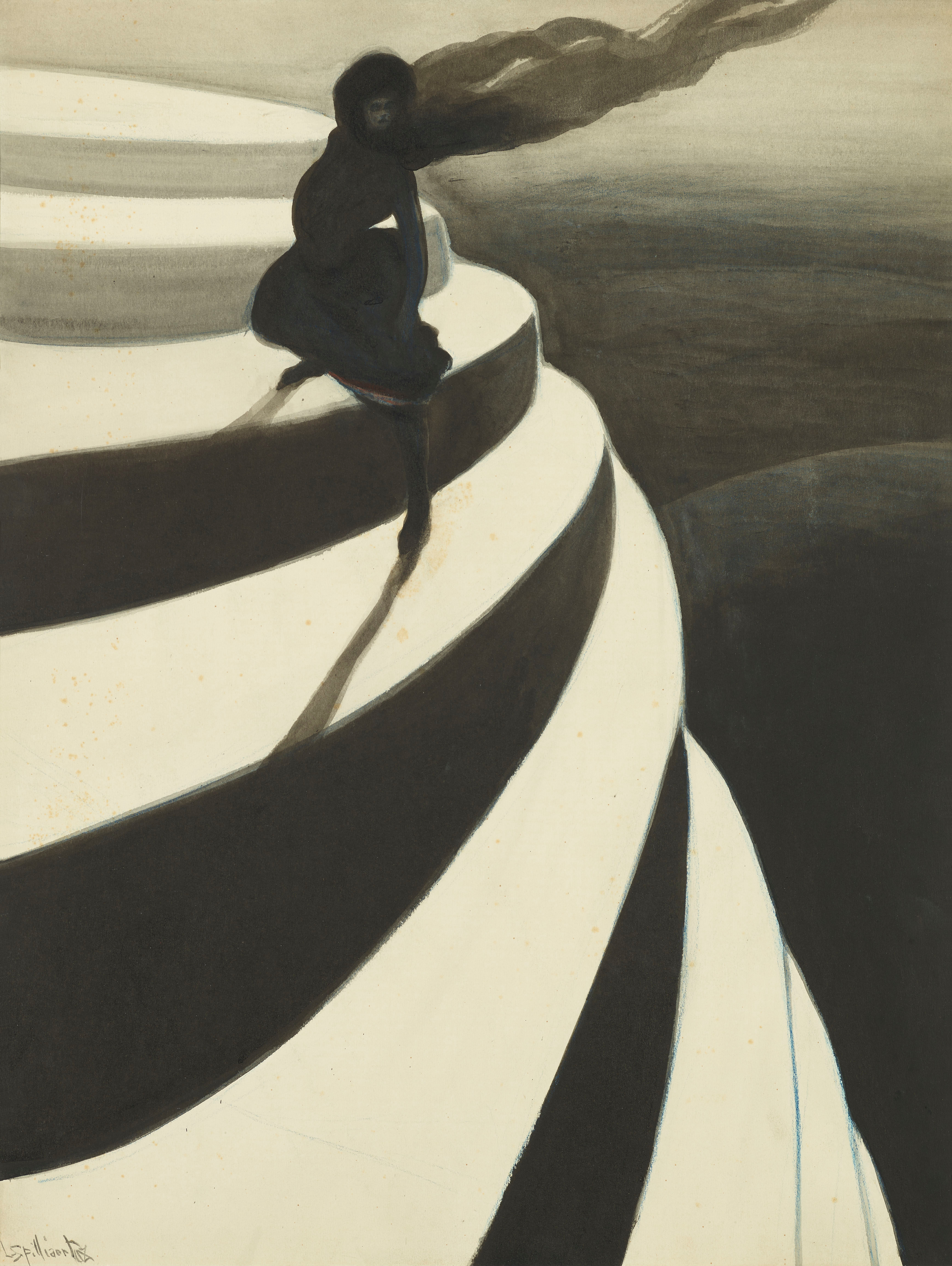
Vertigo

In 1899, at the age of 18, he entered the Bruges Academy of Art as a pupil of Pieter Raoux. Among his classmates were Léon Slabbinck and Cornelis Leegenhoek. However, he soon became disappointed and left the academy in January 1900. For this lack of formal artistic training, Spilliaert is considered more of an autodidact.

When he was 21, Spilliaert went to work in Brussels for Edmond Deman, a publisher of the works of symbolist writers, for which Spilliaert was to design illustrations. Deman introduced Léon Spilliaert to the art scene in Brussels. It was also there that he discovered the work of the old masters and contemporary painters through reproductions and exhibited works of art. Spilliaert stayed with Deman until January 1904. He had an affair with the 17-year old daughter of Deman which ended in a painful breakup which sent Spilliaert into a depression. At the end of January 1904, Spilliaert left Brussels for Paris to try his luck with a publisher or printer of art books. Deman gave him a letter addressed to the writer Emile Verhaeren asking him to offer Spilliaert all the help he needed. In February 1904 Spilliaert met Verhaeren, who lived in Saint-Cloud, in Paris. A great friendship quickly developed between the two men. Verhaeren bought some of his works and introduced him to his friends and art dealers. One of them was Clovis Sagot, who at the time was exhibiting works by Pablo Picasso.

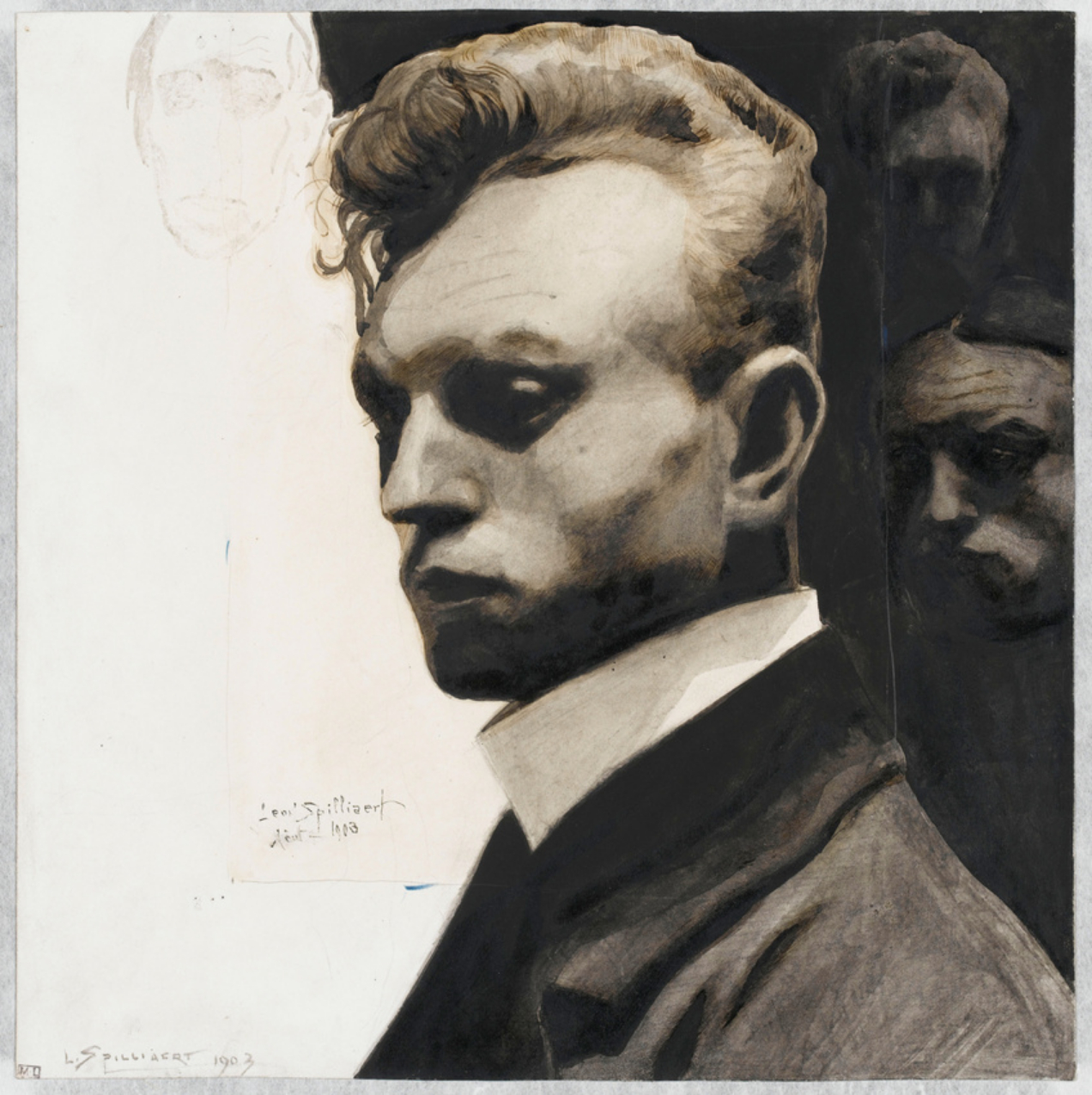
Self-Portrait with Masks, 1903

Between 1907 and 1913, Léon Spilliaert exhibited his work at various events: Salon de Printemps de Jean De Mot, Salon des Indépendants de Bruxelles, the salon of the Brussels Doe Stil Voort and the exhibition Les Bleus de la G.G.G. in Brussels.

In 1916 he married Rachel Vergison. They settled in Brussels, where their daughter was born. After the First World War, he collaborates with the Sélection group, which exhibits his work for many years. In 1922, the first exhibition entirely dedicated to his paintings takes place at the Brussels gallery Centaure. From 1925 to 1931, his work hangs in the Kursaal in Ostend. In 1937, he joined the Compagnons de l'Art. In 1922 he was made a Knight of the Order of the Crown.

Having settled at 13 rue Alphonse-Renard in Ixelles in 1942, he died there of a heart attack, on November 23, 1946.

== Work ==
Watercolor, gouache, pastel, and charcoal—often in combination—were the means by which he produced many of his works, among which are a number of monochrome self-portraits executed in the early years of the twentieth century. Spilliaert's expressive use of black finds parallels in the work of Odilon Redon, who was a significant influence. Frequently depicting a lone figure in a dreamlike space, Spilliaert's paintings convey a sense of melancholy and silence.

His later work shows a concentration on seascapes. Among the best-known works of Léon Spilliaert are the images Digue la nuit and Clair de Lune et Lumières. Both works are in the Musée d'Orsay in Paris.

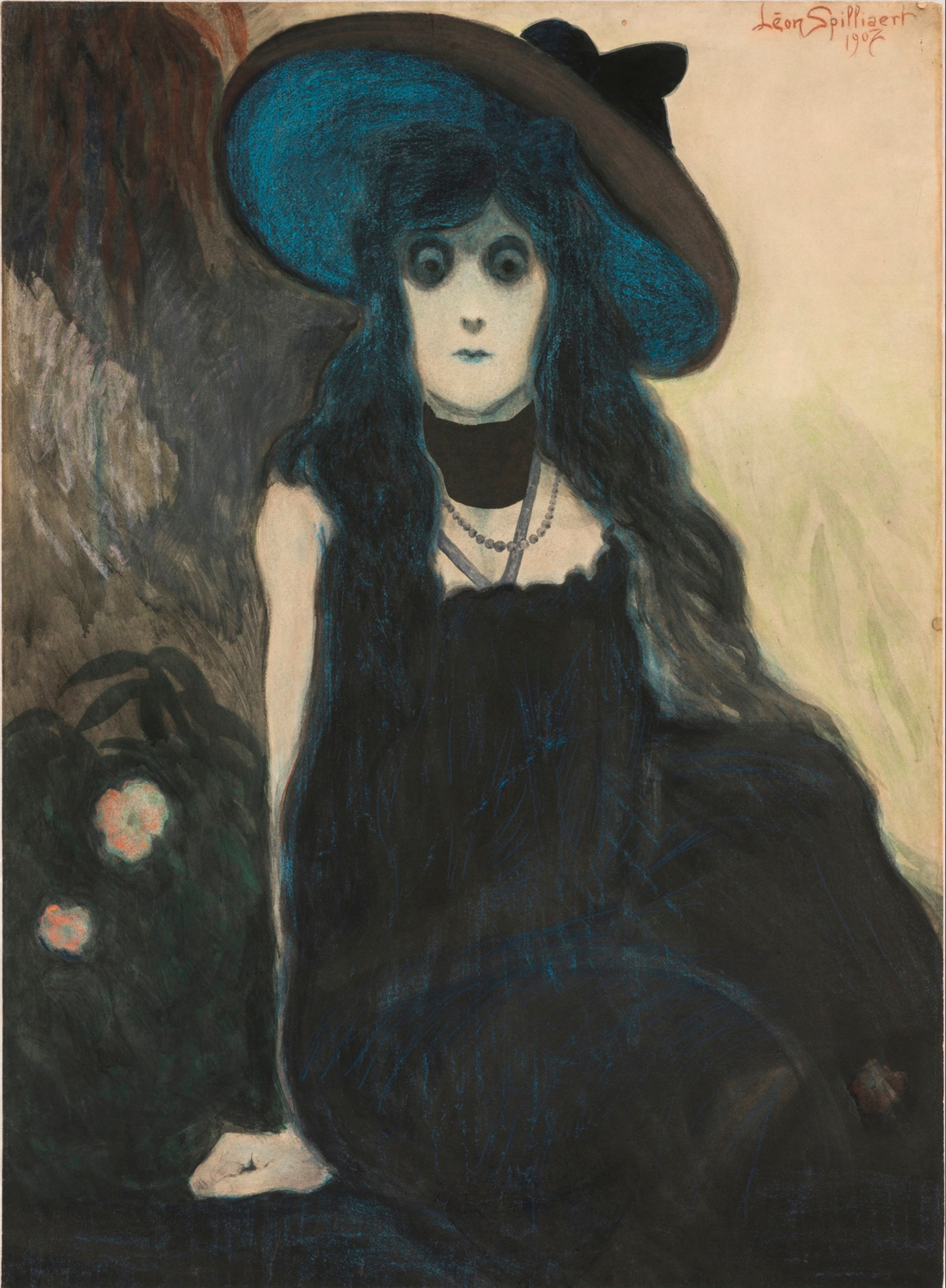
The Absinth Drinker, 1907

Most of Spilliaert's works are marked by an oppressive alien and elegiac atmosphere. In Digue la nuit (1908), the painter removes any naturalistic characteristics of the landscape depicted in the image and creates a stylization in which the location, that serves as a template, is redesigned to become the mirror of a state of mind. Solitude, mystery, and hallucination are suggested by the landscape.

In Clair de Lune et Lumières (c. 1909), the colonnade and arcades of the façade of the Kursaal ballroom on the seawall in Ostend served Spilliaert as a basis for the composition of an urban landscape. In this pastel painting, he catches the eerie transformation of the architecture at night and the strangeness that comes from artificial lighting. With its cosmic, metaphysical traits Clair de Lune et Lumières reveals the influence of Van Gogh, and is reminiscent of The Starry Night.

In the period 1902–1909, Spilliaert concentrated on creating complex, profound self-portraits of an introspective nature. His 1903 Self-Portrait with Masks (Musée d'Orsay) is a dramatic self-presentation with ghostly apparitions in the background and a wry face in three-quarter pose. This image may be regarded as a prototype for the three-quarter-portraits Spilliaert created later.

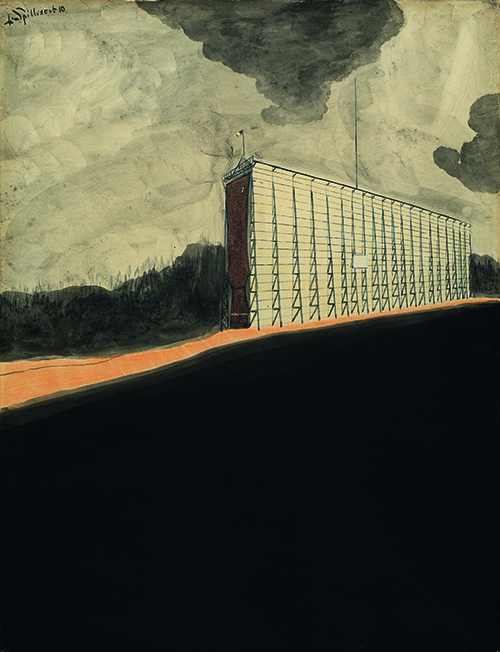
The Pilot of the Airship, 1910, The Phoebus Foundation

== Legacy ==
Ian Wilson's Spilliaert's Beach, for violin and piano, was inspired by and named for the painting Moonlight Beach.

== Bibliography ==
- Adriaens-Pannie, Anne (2006). Leon Spilliaert: Le Regard De L' Ame. Bertrams. ISBN 978-90-5544-628-5.
- Hostyn, Norbert; Spilliaert, Léon (2006). Léon Spilliaert: Leven en werk : doorheen de verzameling van het Museum voor Schone Kunsten Oostende = vie et œuvre : à travers la collection du Musée de Beaux-Arts d'Oostende = life and work : through the collection of the Museum of Fine Arts in Oostende = Leben und Werk : Führung durch die Sammlung des Museum voor Schone Kunsten Oostende. Oostkamp: Stichting Kunstboek. ISBN 978-90-5856-199-2.
- Jacobs, Alain (2006). Léon Spilliaert dans les collections de la Bibliothèque royale de Belgique=in de verzamelingen van de Koninklijk Bibliotheek van België. Bruxelles, Bibliothèque royale de Belgique, 22 Sept 2006 – 03 Feb 2007. ISBN 2-87093-161-1. This text fully copied and surprisingly only signed by Anne Adriaens-Pannier on the coverbook: Anne Adriaens-Pannier & Alain Jacobs(author of text) : "Léon Spilliaert : de verzameling van de Koninklijke Bibliotheek van België = la collection de la Bibliothèque Royale de Belgique", Antwerpen : Pandora Publishers NV , 2018. This edition accompanies the exhibition "Léon Spilliaert. De verzameling van de Koninklijke Bibliotheek van België" in The Venetiaanse Gaanderijen van 30 juni tot 30 September 2018.
- Hostyn, Norbert (2007). Leon Spilliaert: Life and Work. Stichting Kunstboek. ISBN 978-90-5856-199-2.
- Spilliaert, Léon (2006). Léon Spilliaert. Salamanca: Caja Duero. ISBN 978-84-87132-94-0.
