= Albert Demuyser =

Belgian artist (1920–2003)

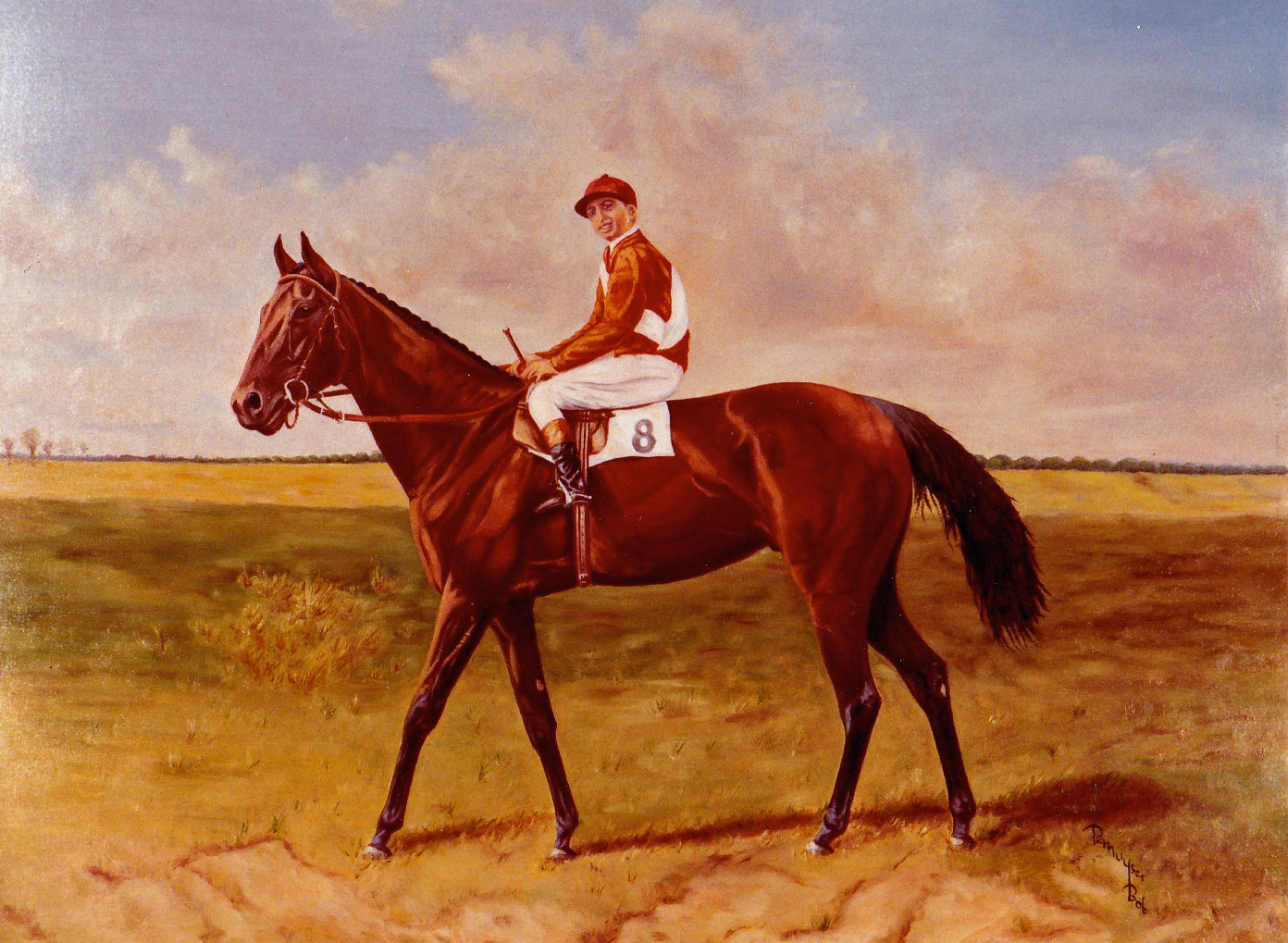
- Prince Rose
- Born: Albert-Joseph-Léon Demuyser; 20 March 1920; Laeken, Belgium
- Died: 6 September 2003 (aged 83); Uccle, Belgium
- Notable work: Prince Rose

Albert-Joseph-Léon "Bob" Demuyser (Laeken, 3 September 1920 – Uccle, 15 June 2003) was a Belgian artist and racehorse owner. In his work, he had a preference for natural-looking images of horses.

== Artistic career ==
=== From 1980 to 1983 ===
Norcliffe – Gap of Dunloe – Sharpman – Trepan – Sharafaz – Raja Baba – Vitriolic – Étalon Anglais – Le Laboureur – Playfull River (1982) – Our Talisman – Top Command – Hawkin's Special – Shirley Heights (1982) – Cadoudal – Concertino – Assert (1982) – Is It Safe – Peire (1983) – Never have Mercy – Northern Baby (1983) – Toscanito

Signature : Demuyser

=== From 1984 to 1997 ===
Realm Sound – Gap of Dunloe – Prince Rose – Rare Stone – Northjet – Noblequest (1985) – Wouter Raphorst – Chief Singer (1985) – Hegor The Horrible – Lou Piguet – Flash of Steel – Crystal So – Mr. Paganini – Northern Sound – Master Reef – Danehill's foal – Le Labrador – Knight Moves (1993) – Daggers drawn (1997) – Garuda (Yearling) – Crying Knight – The farrier – Be My Best

Signature : Demuyser Bob

== Gallery ==
=== Oil on canvas ===
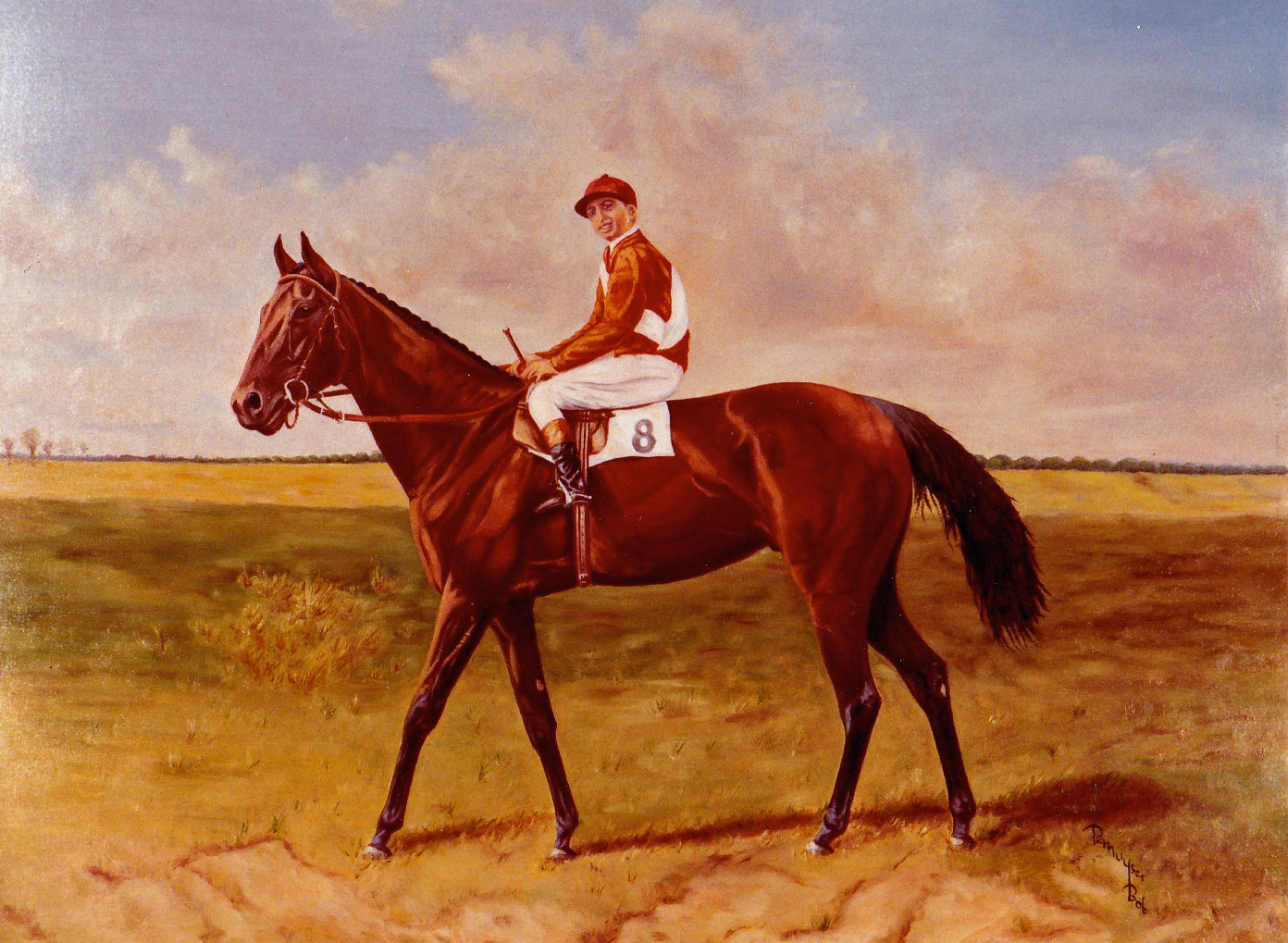
Prince Rose (Hervé Denaigre)

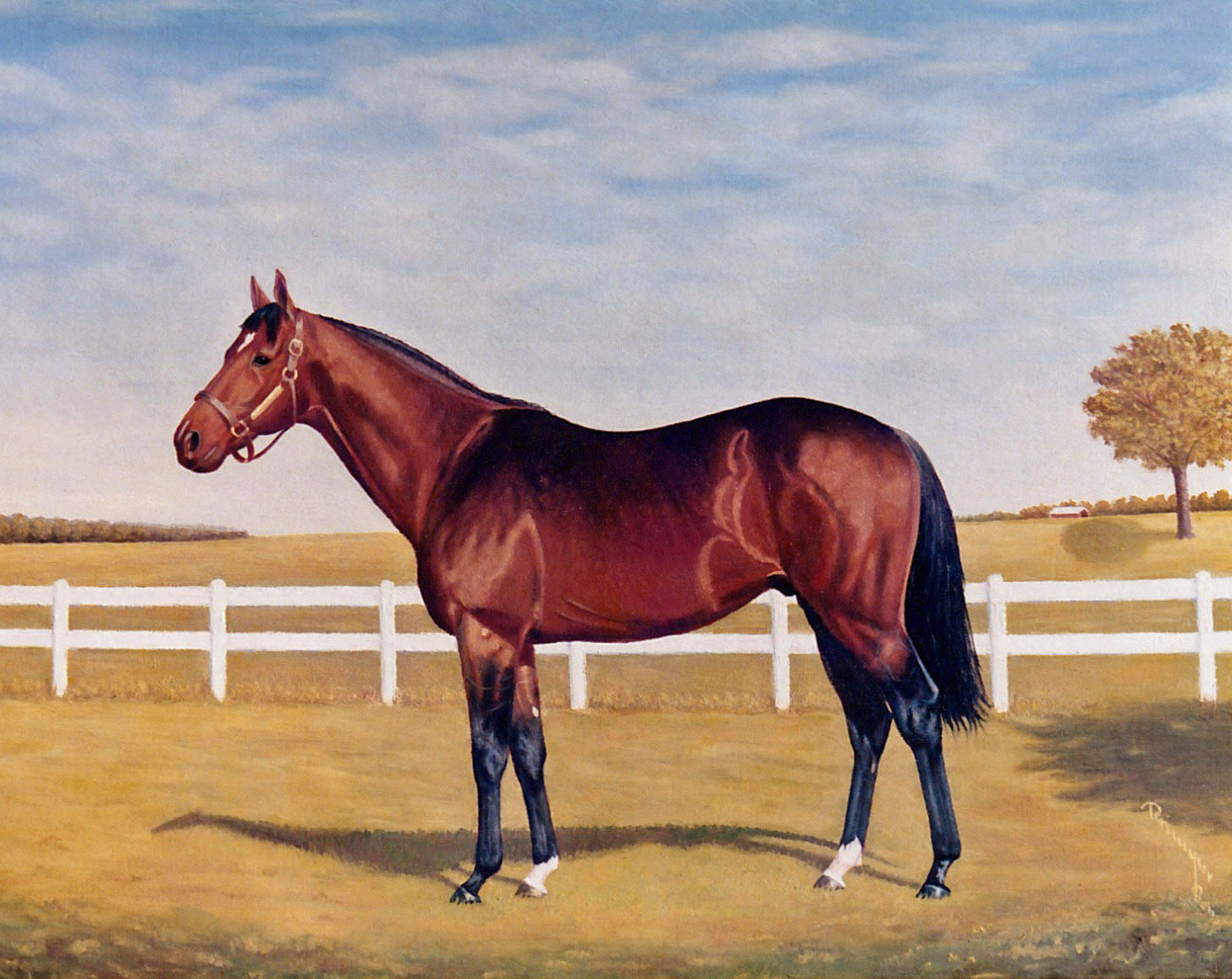
Lou Piguet

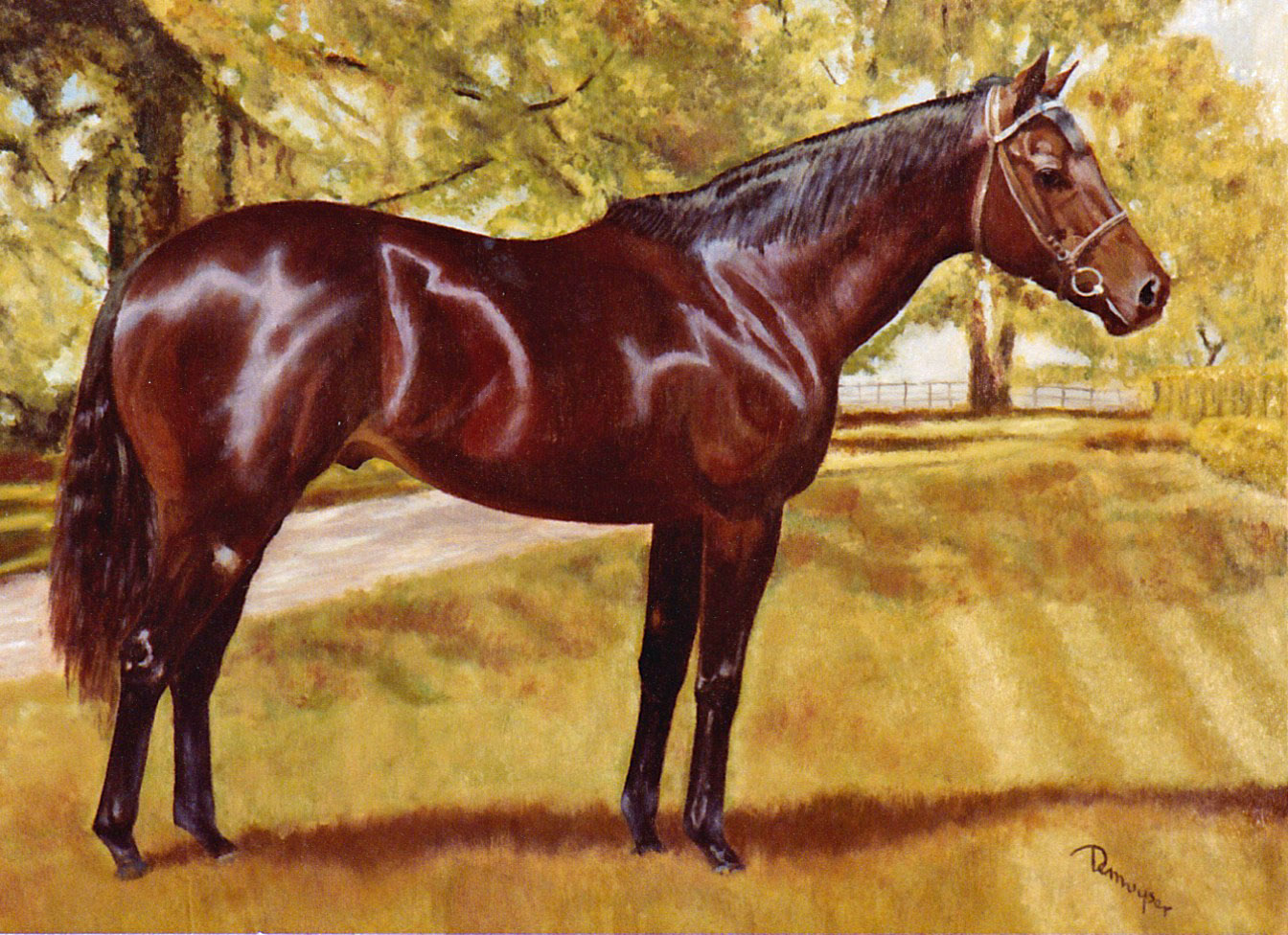
Our talisman

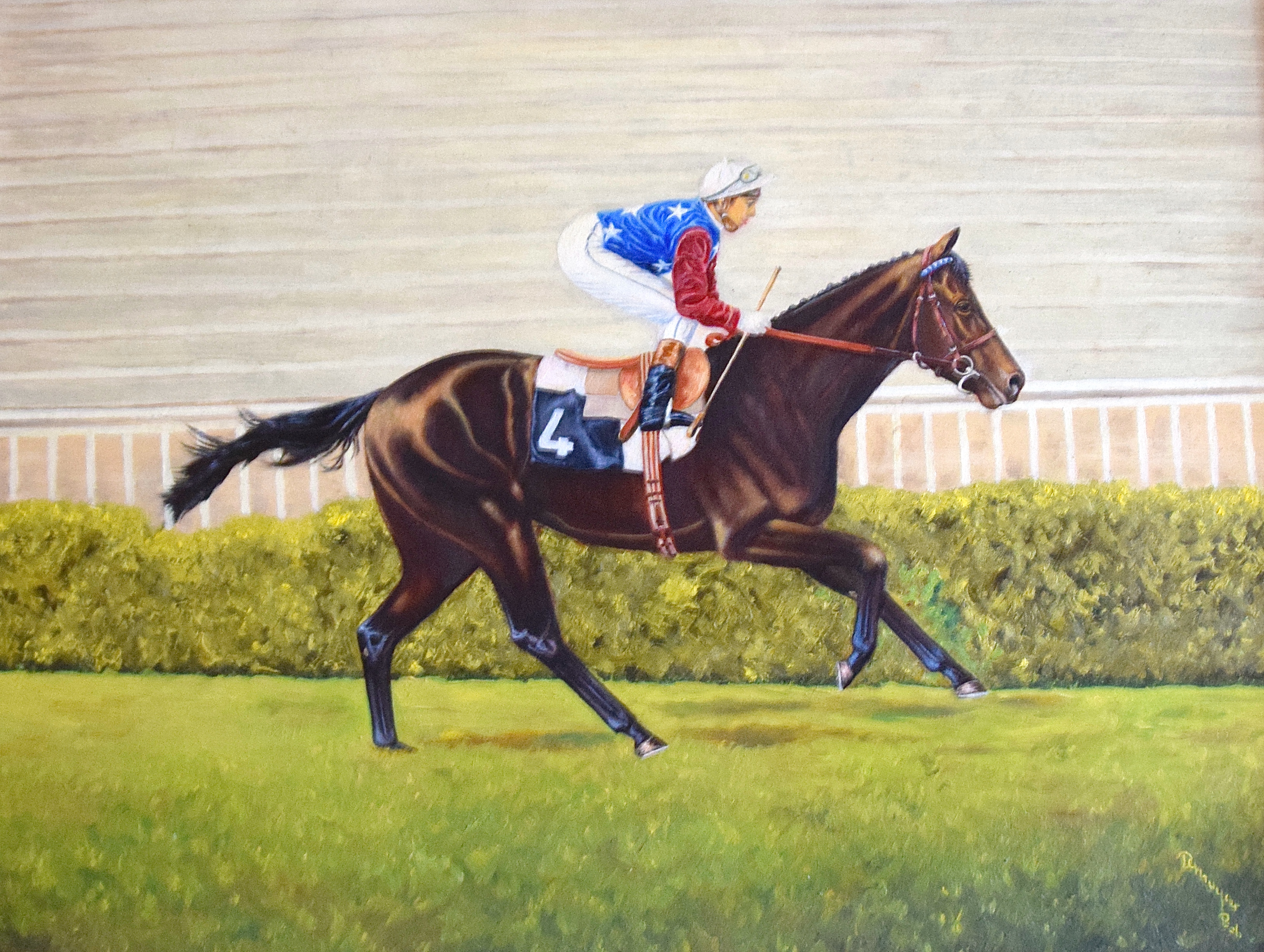
Gap of Dunloe

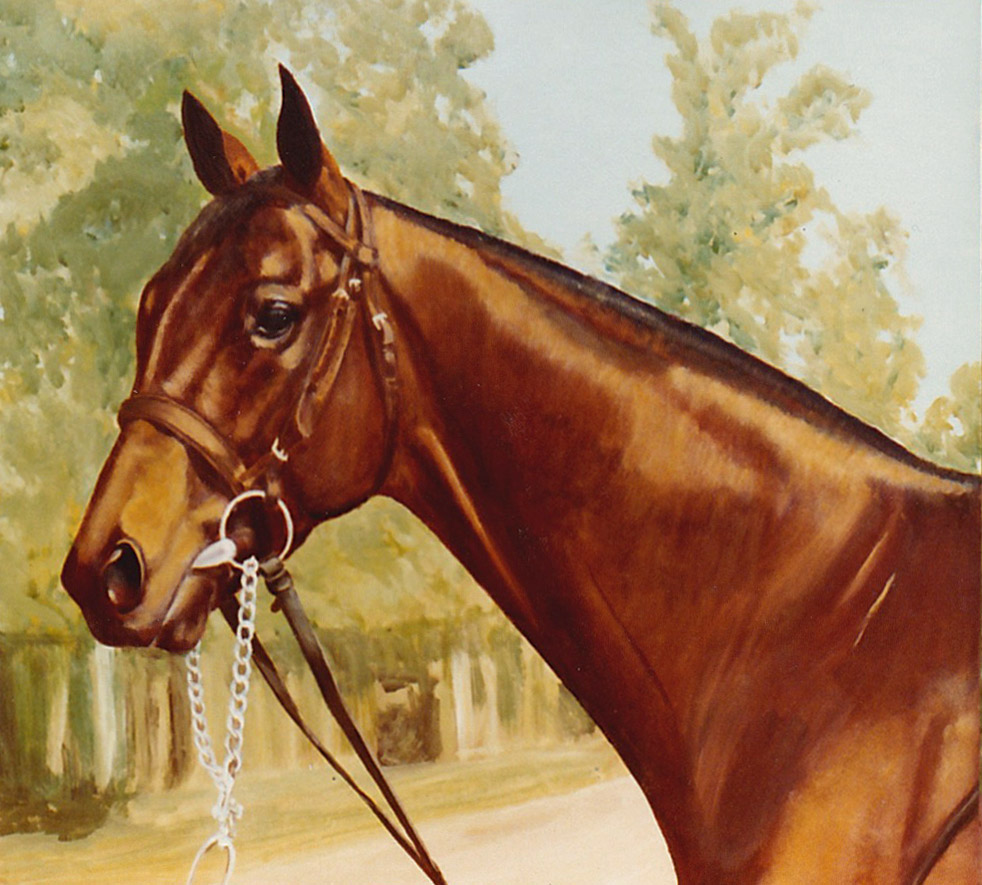
Norcliffe

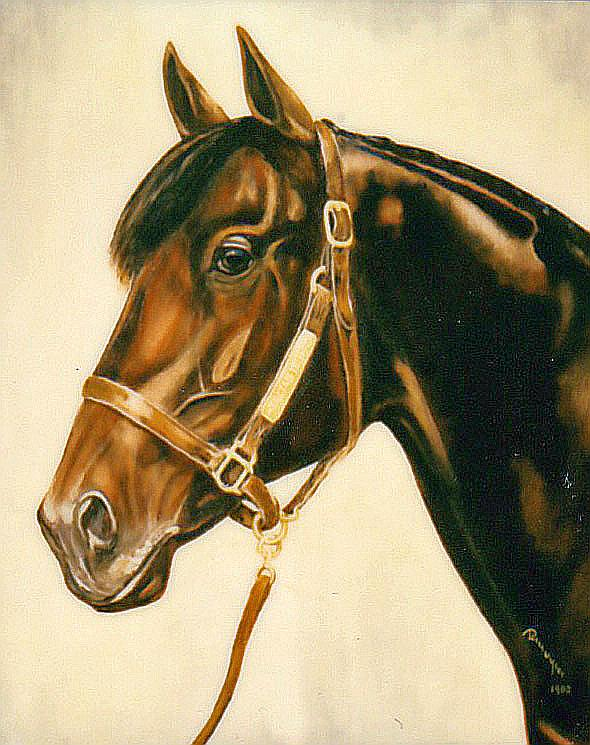
Shirley Heights

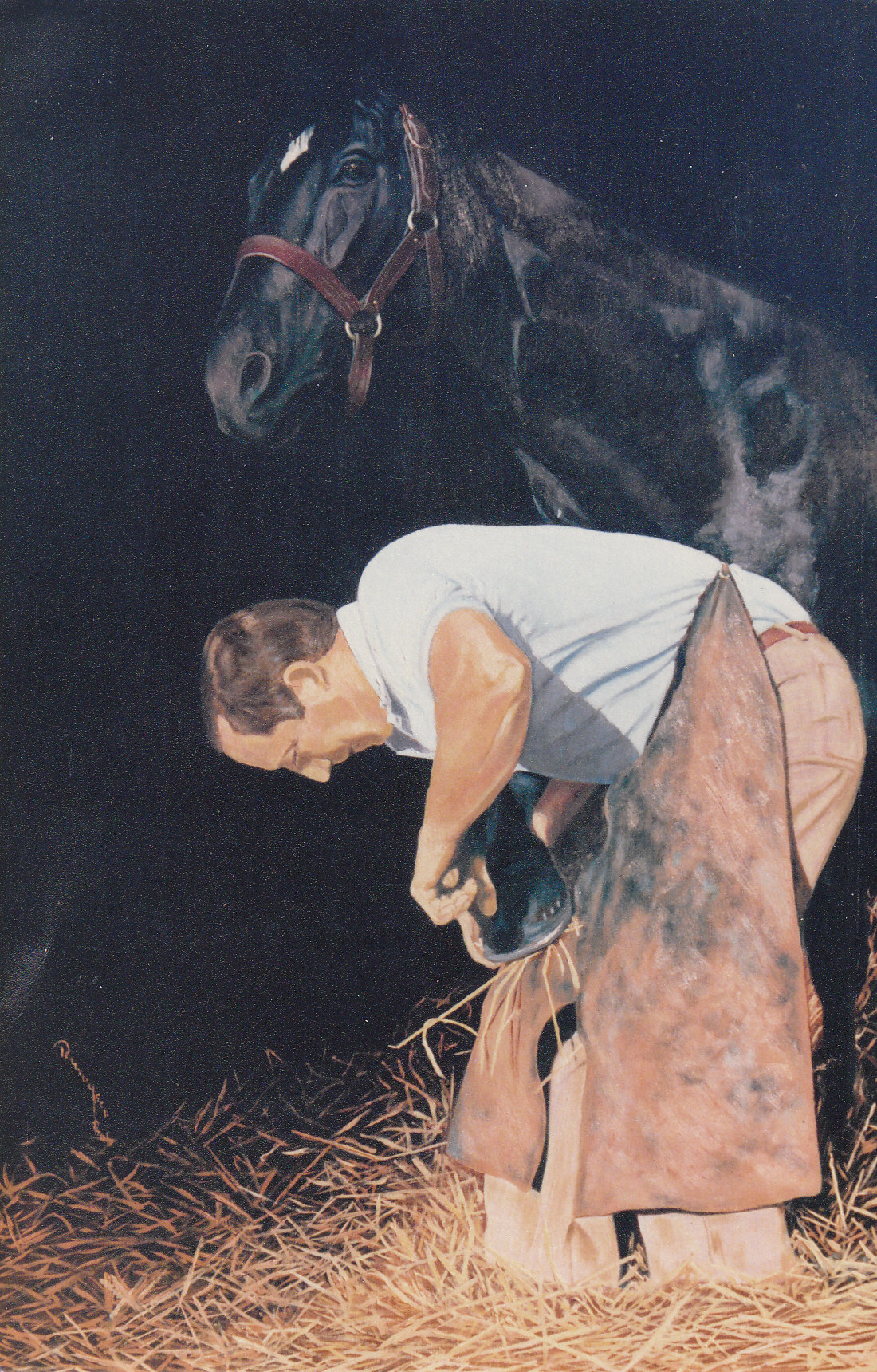
The farrier

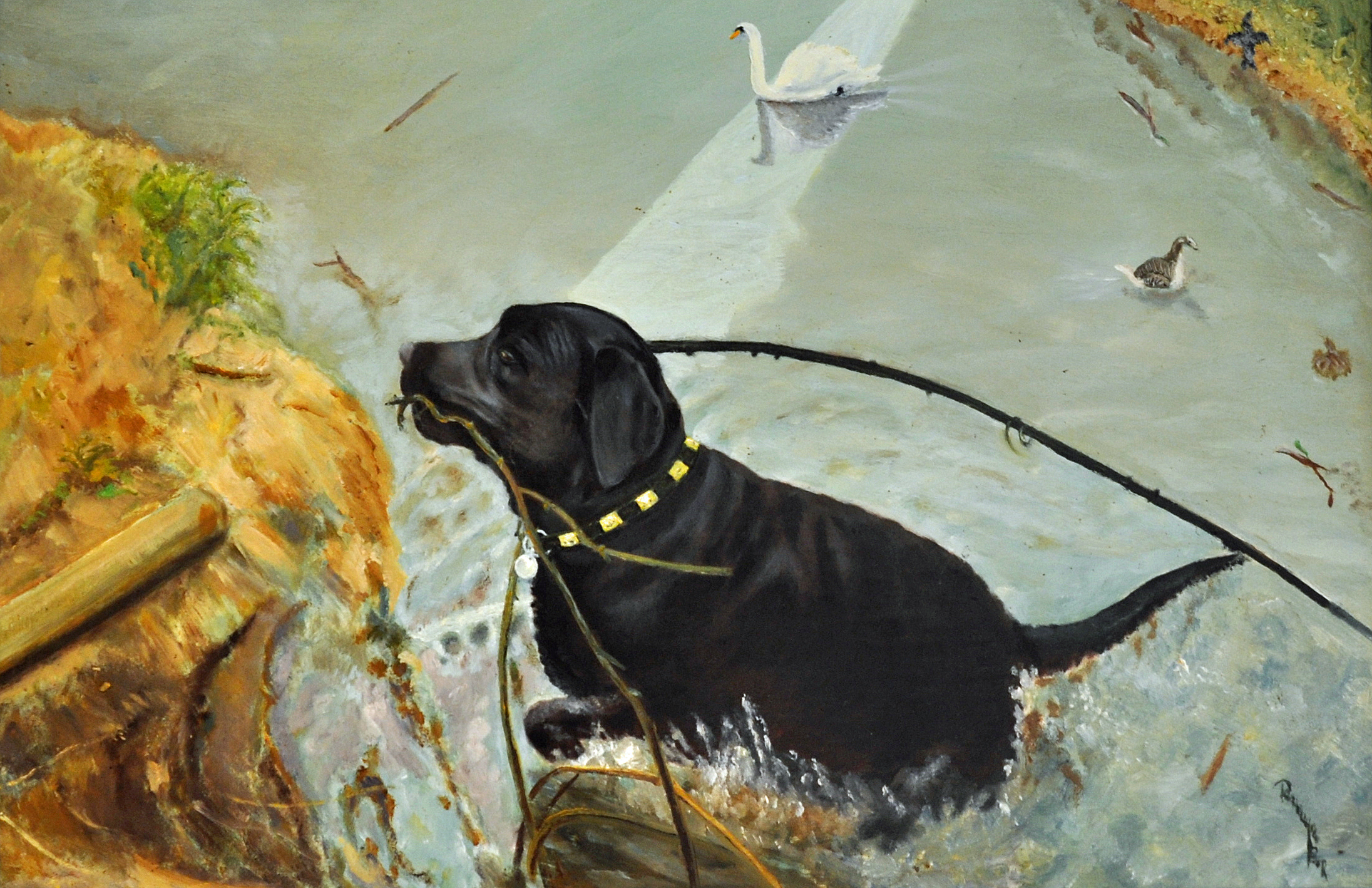
The Labrador Retriever

=== Publications ===
1983 - 1984 - 1985

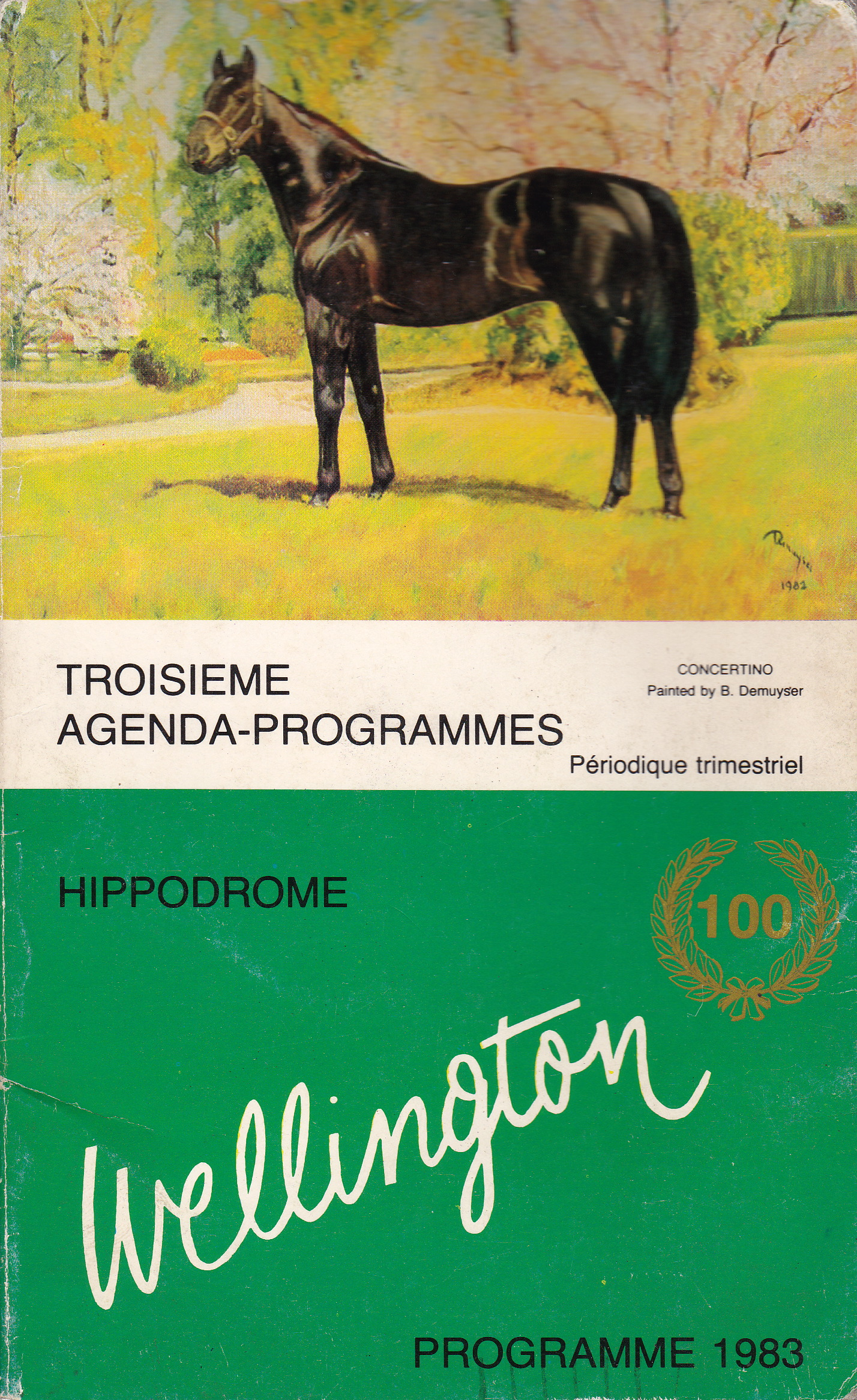
Concertino

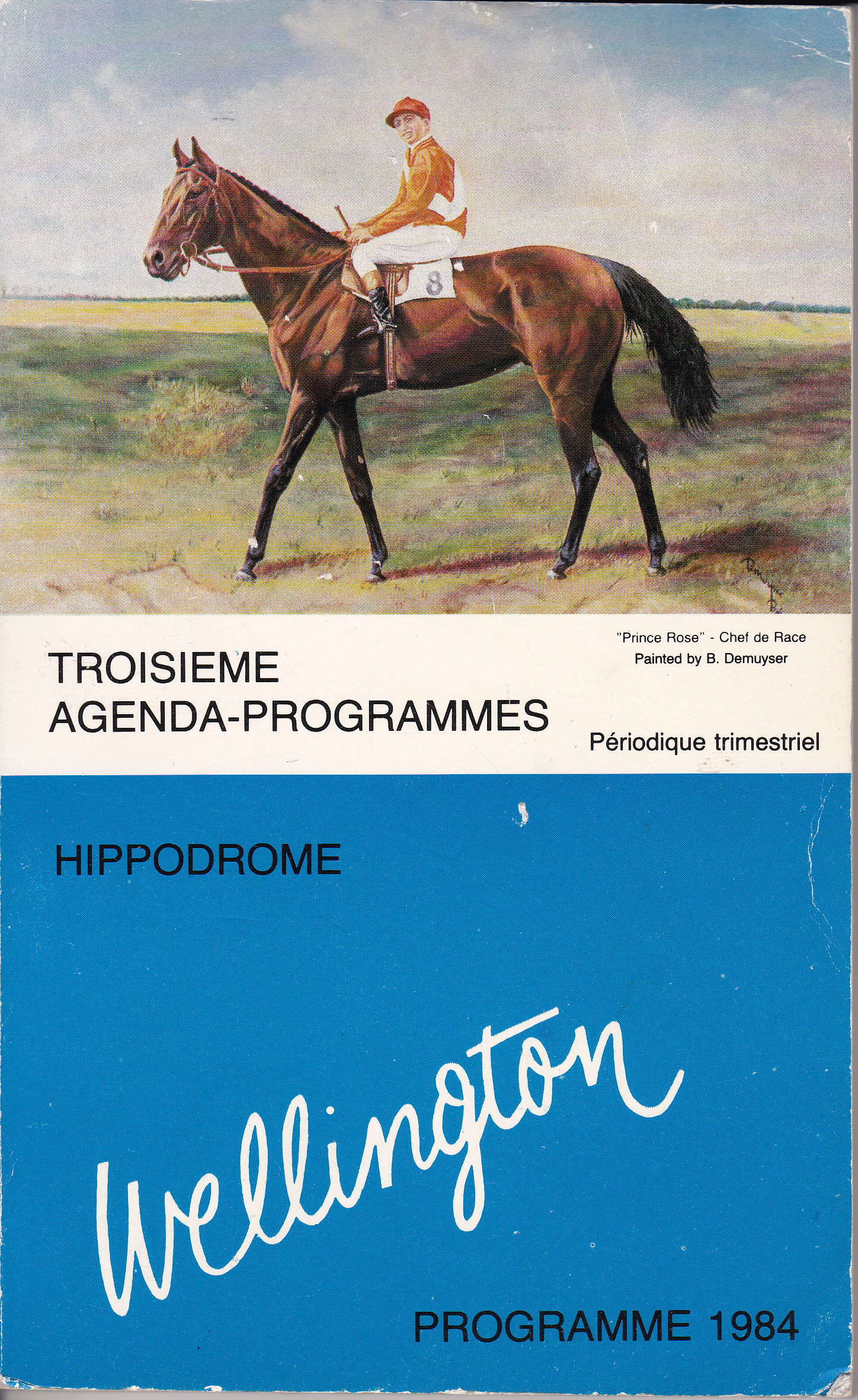
Prince Rose

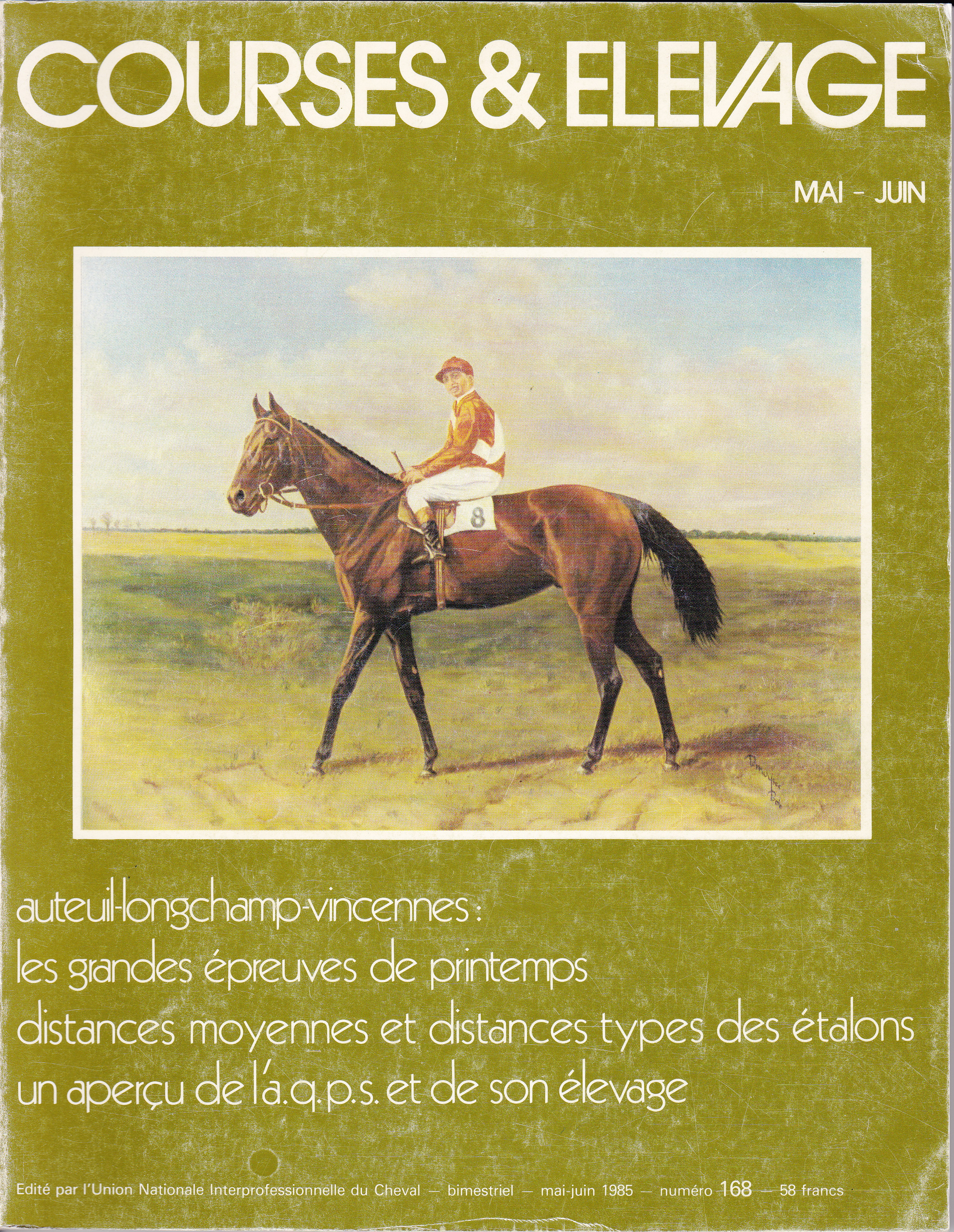
Prince Rose

== Turf palmarés ==
Prix du Jockey Club
1981
Bikala	Akarad	Gap of Dunloe

Grand Prix Prince Rose
1981
Strong Gale	Gap of Dunloe	Royal Fountain

Magnolia Stakes
1998
Garuda	Ukraine Venture	Star Précision

Gordon Richards Stakes
1998
Germano	Garuda	Riyadian

Brigadier Gerard Stakes
1998
Insatiable	Garuda	Germano

Group races (1, 2, 3 and Listed race) :

- Winner of the Grand Prix de la Ville de Nice, hippodrome de la Côte d'Azur, 1974
- 3rd of the Prix du Jockey Club, hippodrome de Chantilly, 1981
- 2d of the Grand Prix Prince Rose, hippodrome d'Ostende, 1981
- Winner of the Prix d'Hédouville, hippodrome de Longchamp, 1982
- 3rd of the Prix Jean de Chaudenay, hippodrome de Saint-Cloud, 1982
- Winner of the Magnolia Stakes, Kempton Park Racecourse, 1998
- 2d of the Gordon Richards Stakes, Sandown Park Racecourse, 1998
- 2d of the Brigadier Gerard Stakes, Sandown Park Racecourse, 1998
- 2d of the Prix Gontaut-Biron, Deauville-La Touques Racecourse, 1998
- 2d of the Preis von Europa, Cologne-Weidenpesch Racecourse, 1998

== See also ==
- List of Belgian painters
- Prix du Jockey Club: Assert
- Prix d'Hédouville: Gap of Dunloe
- Prix Paul de Moussac: Lou Piguet
- Prix de la Salamandre: Noblequest
- Prix du Cadran: Shafaraz
- Epsom Derby et Irish Derby: Shirley Heights
- Saratoga Special Stakes: Our Talisman
- Prince of Wales Stakes: Norcliffe
- Champion Stakes: Northern Baby
- St. James's Palace Stakes: Chief Singer
- Grand Prix Prince Rose: Prince Rose
- Poot family, family of his mother
- de Muyser Lantwyck family
