= Grand Prix de Bruxelles =

Belgian horse race

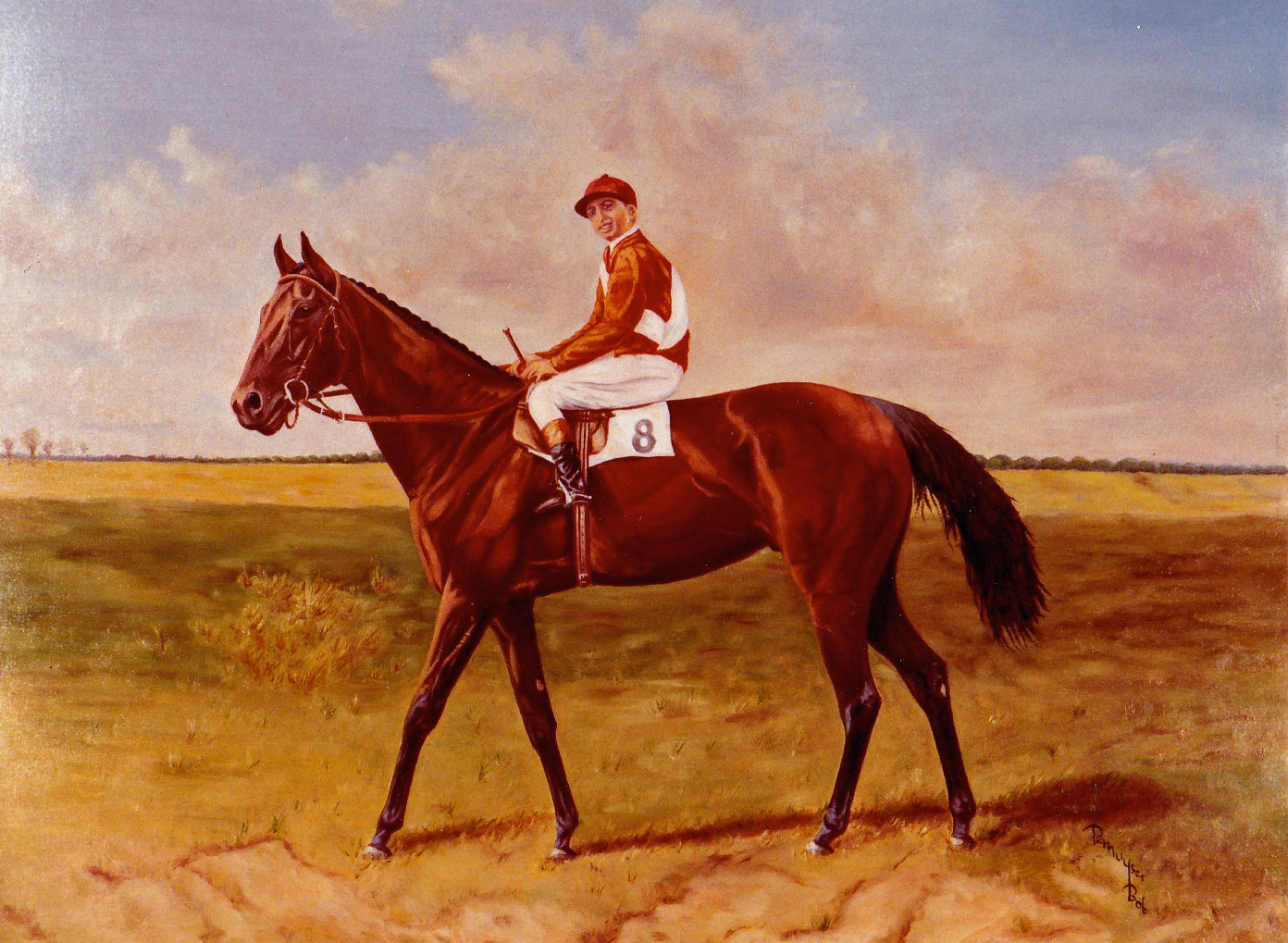
- Prince Rose (Hervé Denaigre), winner in 1931, painted by Bob Demuyser (1920-2003)
- Class: Group 1
- Location: Boitsfort Racecourse
- Inaugurated: 1886
- Race type: Flat / Thoroughbred

Race information
- Purse: FB 1,000,000

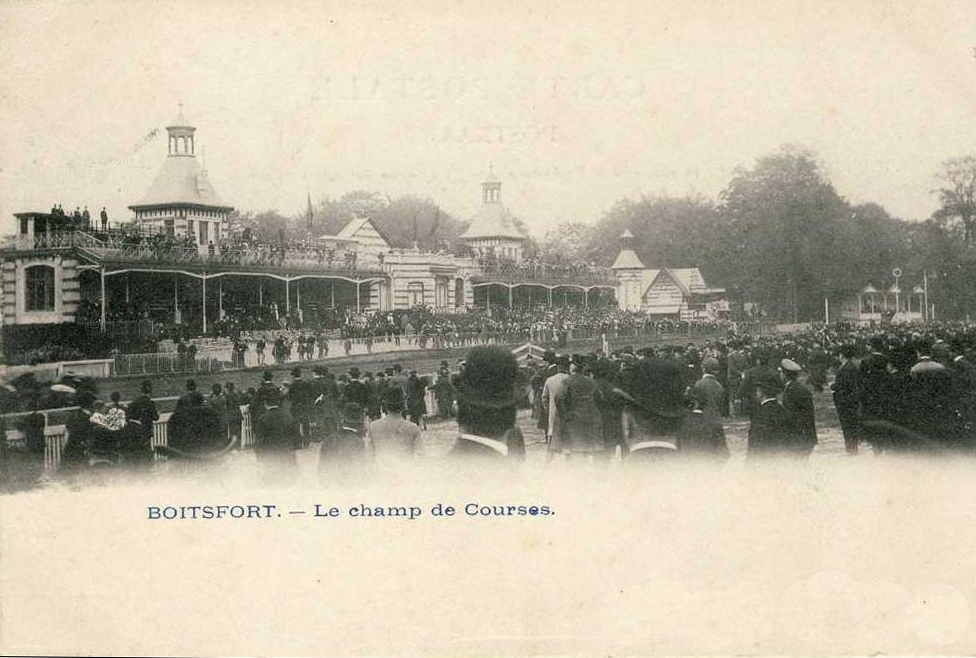
Boitsfort Racecourse.

The Grand Prix de Bruxelles was a horse race which initially held at Boitsfort Racecourse. It was a Group I race - FB 1,000,000 (in 1984) - 2,200 meters.

== Palmarès from 1886 to 1986 ==
see : Thoroughbred Database GRAND PRIX DE BRUXELLES - BOITSFORT

== Some famous winners ==
- Finasseur, 1905
- Prince Rose, en 1931
- North Stoke, 1977

== See also ==
- GR I Grand Prix Prince Rose
