= Royal Gallery =

Royal Gallery may refer to:

- Royal Gallery (Palace of Westminster), in the Palace of Westminster, London, England
- Royal Galleries of Ostend, a seaside neoclassical arcade on a dike on the beach of Ostend, Belgium
- Royal Collections Gallery, an art museum in Madrid, Spain
- Royal Gallery of Illustration, a 19th-century performance venue in London, England
- Royal Saint-Hubert Galleries, ensemble of 19th-century shopping arcades in central Brussels, Belgium
