= Grand Prix Prince Rose =

Belgian horse race

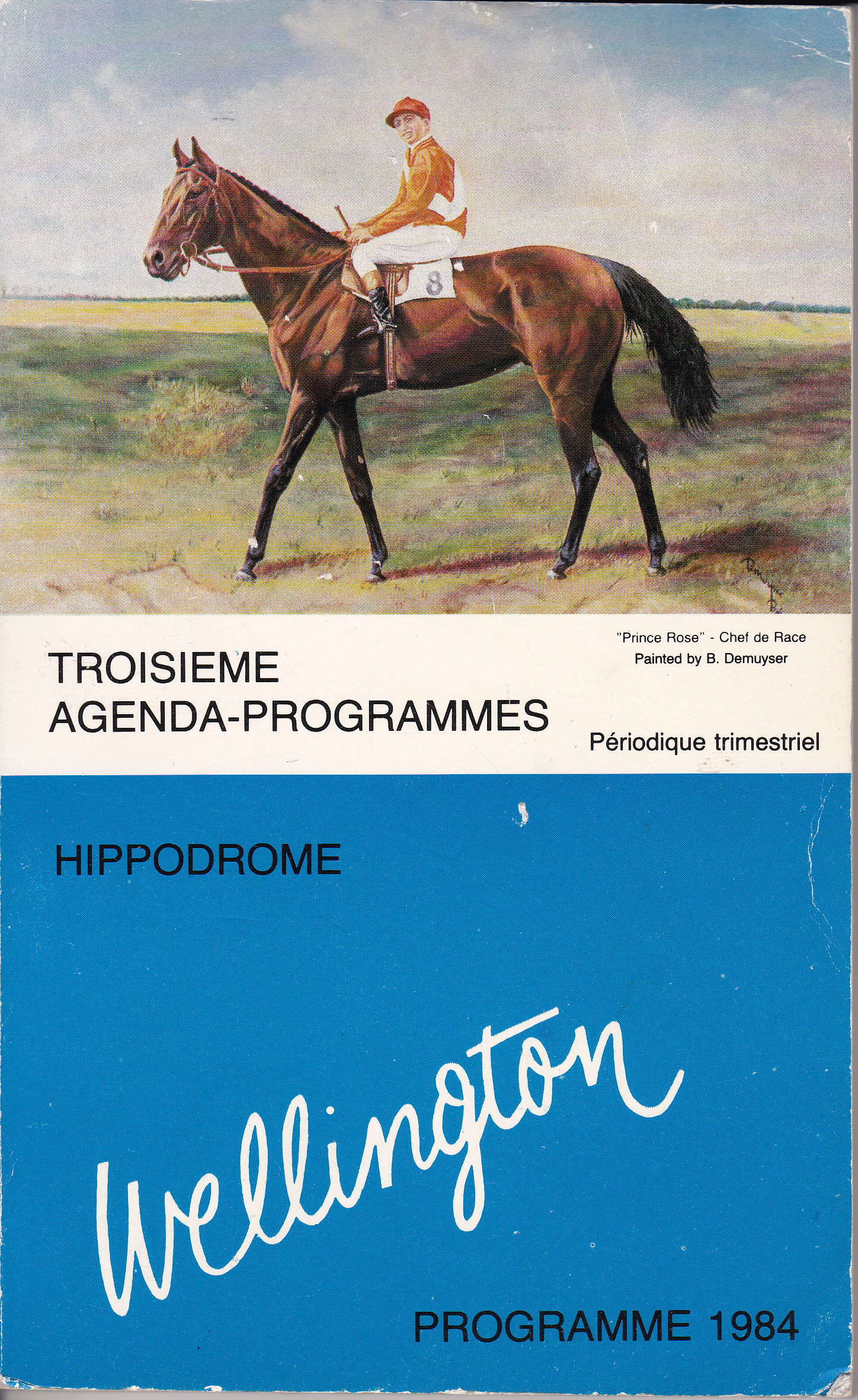
- Prince Rose (Hervé Denaigre), painted by Bob Demuyser (1920-2003)
- Class: LR-BEL
- Location: Ostend racecourse
- Race type: Flat / Thoroughbred

Race information
- Distance: 2100m
- Surface: Turf
- Qualification: Horses which have never finished top 5 in a class A race
- Weight: 57kg Colts/Stallions/Geldings; 53kg Fillies/Mares; +4kg for a class B win in the past year, +6 for multiple wins; +2kg for a class B placing in the past year, +3 for multiple placings
- Purse: €16,000 (as of 2025)

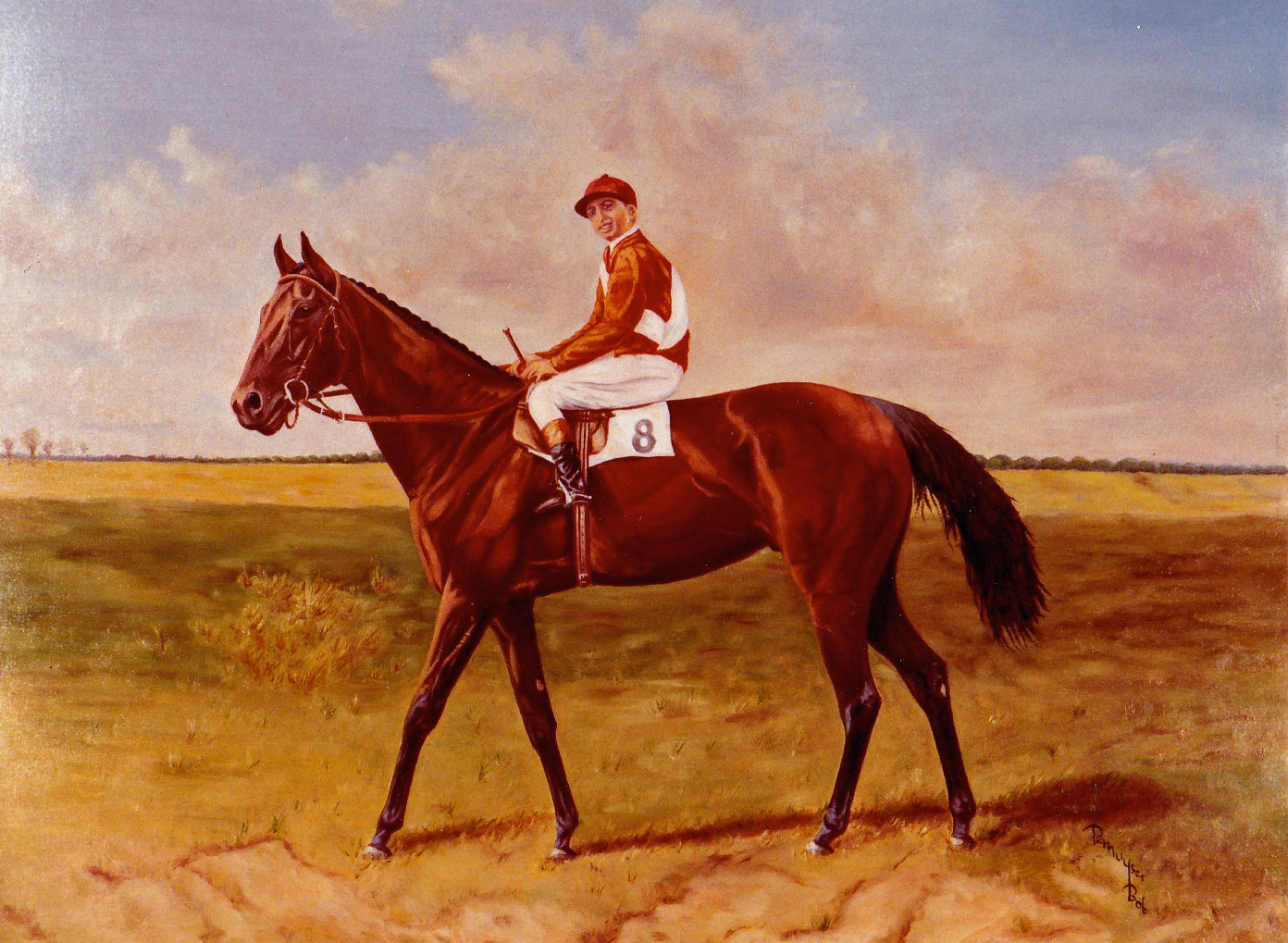
Prince Rose

Grand Prix Prince Rose
1981
Strong Gale	Gap of Dunloe	Royal Fountain

Previous years
1979
Noir et Or	Strong Gale	Crimson Beau

Formerly known as the Grand International d'Ostende (1898), the race was renamed Grand Prix Prince Rose in honor of the great Belgian horse, Prince Rose. It is run in late July or early August at the Ostend racecourse on the occasion of the Belgian National Day. In 1931 Prince Rose beat the French mare Pearl Cap who went on to win the Prix de l'Arc de Triomphe later that year.

== Palmarès from 1923 to 1988 ==
see : Thoroughbred database

== Some famous winners ==
- Le Capucin (1924)
- Prince Rose (1931)
- Corrida (1936 & 1937)
- Rheingold (1973)
- Argument (1980)

== See also ==
- GR I Grand Prix de Bruxelles
