= Charles Girault =

French architect

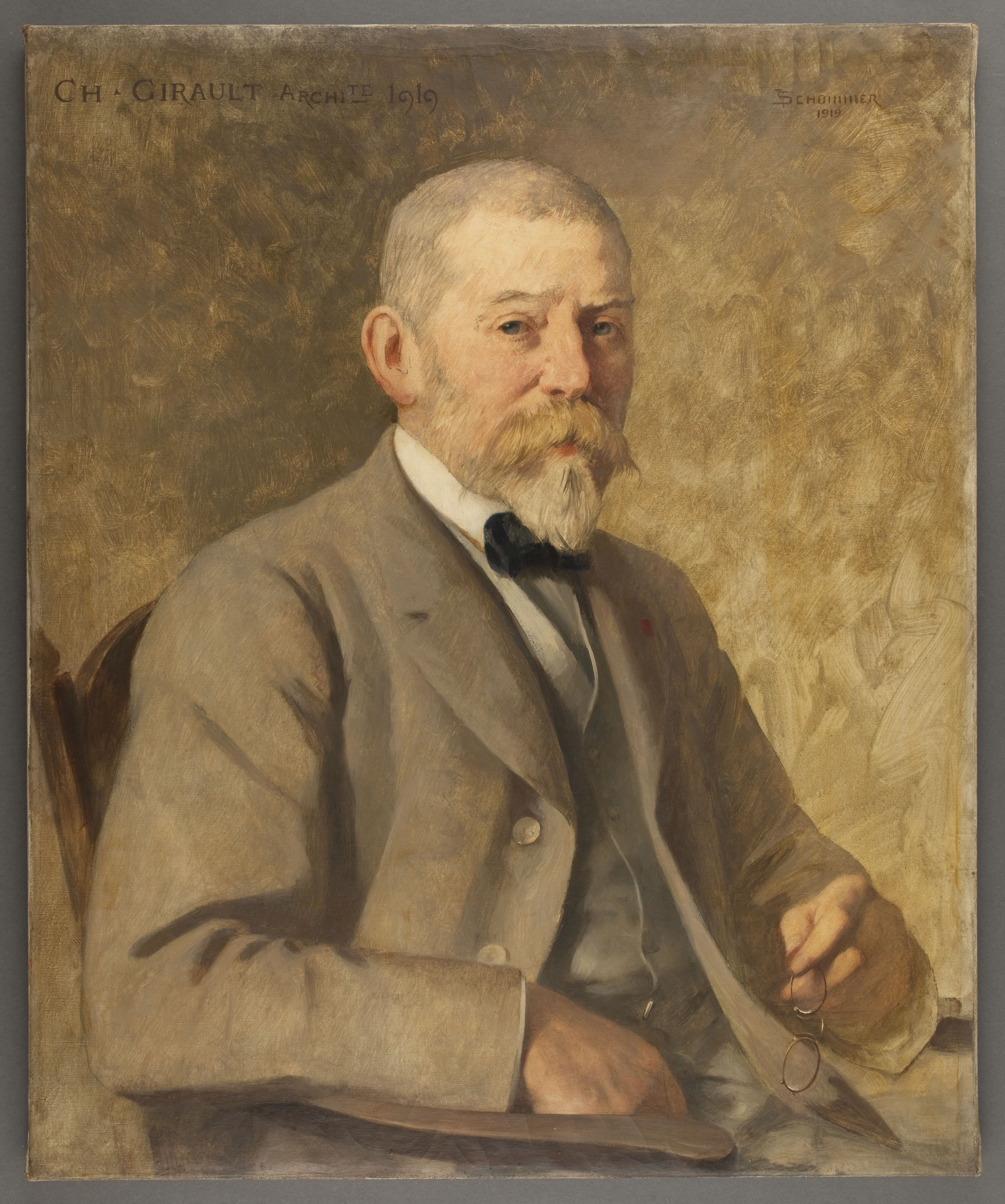
Charles Girault; portrait by François Schommer

Charles-Louis Girault (French pronunciation: [ʃaʁl ʒiʁo]; 27 December 1851 – 26 December 1932) was a French architect.

== Biography ==
Born in Cosne-Cours-sur-Loire, he studied with Honoré Daumet at the École nationale supérieure des Beaux-Arts in Paris. He received the first Prix de Rome, awarded to him in 1880 on the basis of a design for a hospital for sick children along the Mediterranean Sea. Consequently, he became a member of the French Academy in Rome, staying there from 1881 until 1884.

He supervised the work of three other architects at the Grand Palais (1897–1900), and worked at the Petit Palais from 1896 until 1900. He was elected to membership in the Académie des Beaux-Arts in 1902. Girault designed the Royal Galleries of Ostend, built from 1902 to 1906. In 1905 he was chosen by Leopold II of Belgium to design the Arcades du Cinquantenaire in Brussels; also for Brussels, he designed the Royal Museum for Central Africa, begun in 1904 and finished in 1910.

Girault died in Paris on 26 December 1932, one day before what would have been his 81st birthday.

== Selected works ==
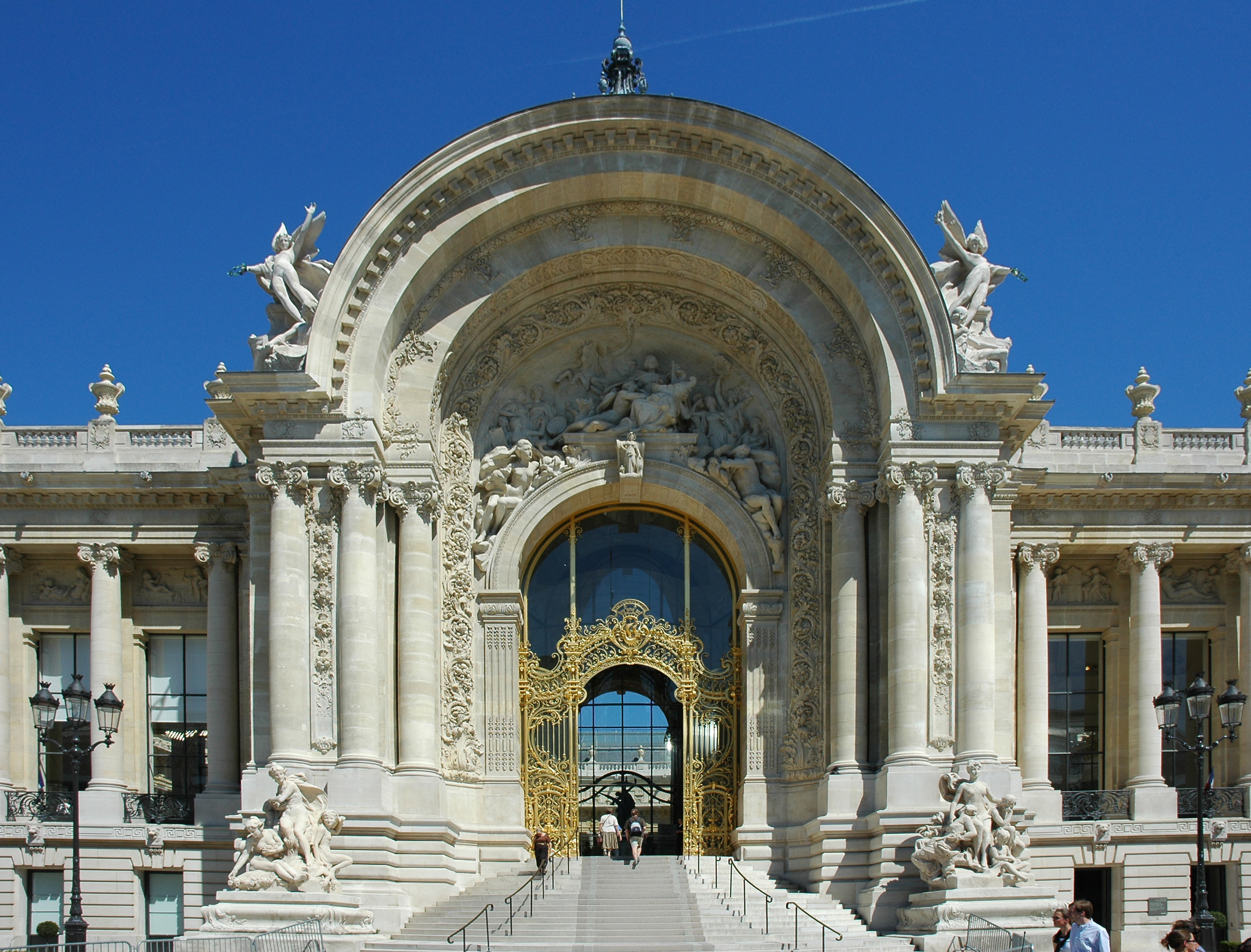
The façade of the Petit Palais, Paris.

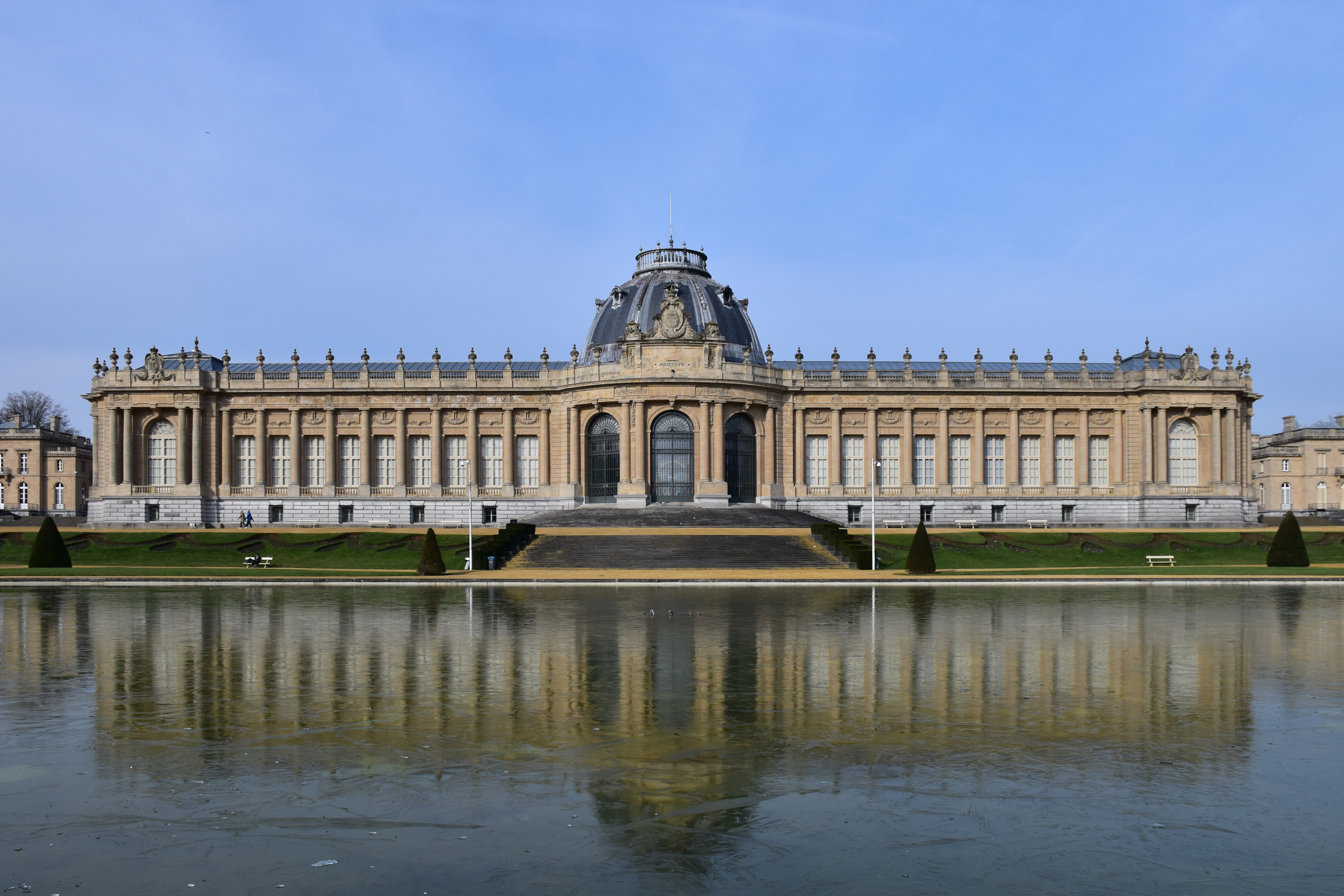
Royal Museum for Central Africa, Tervuren.

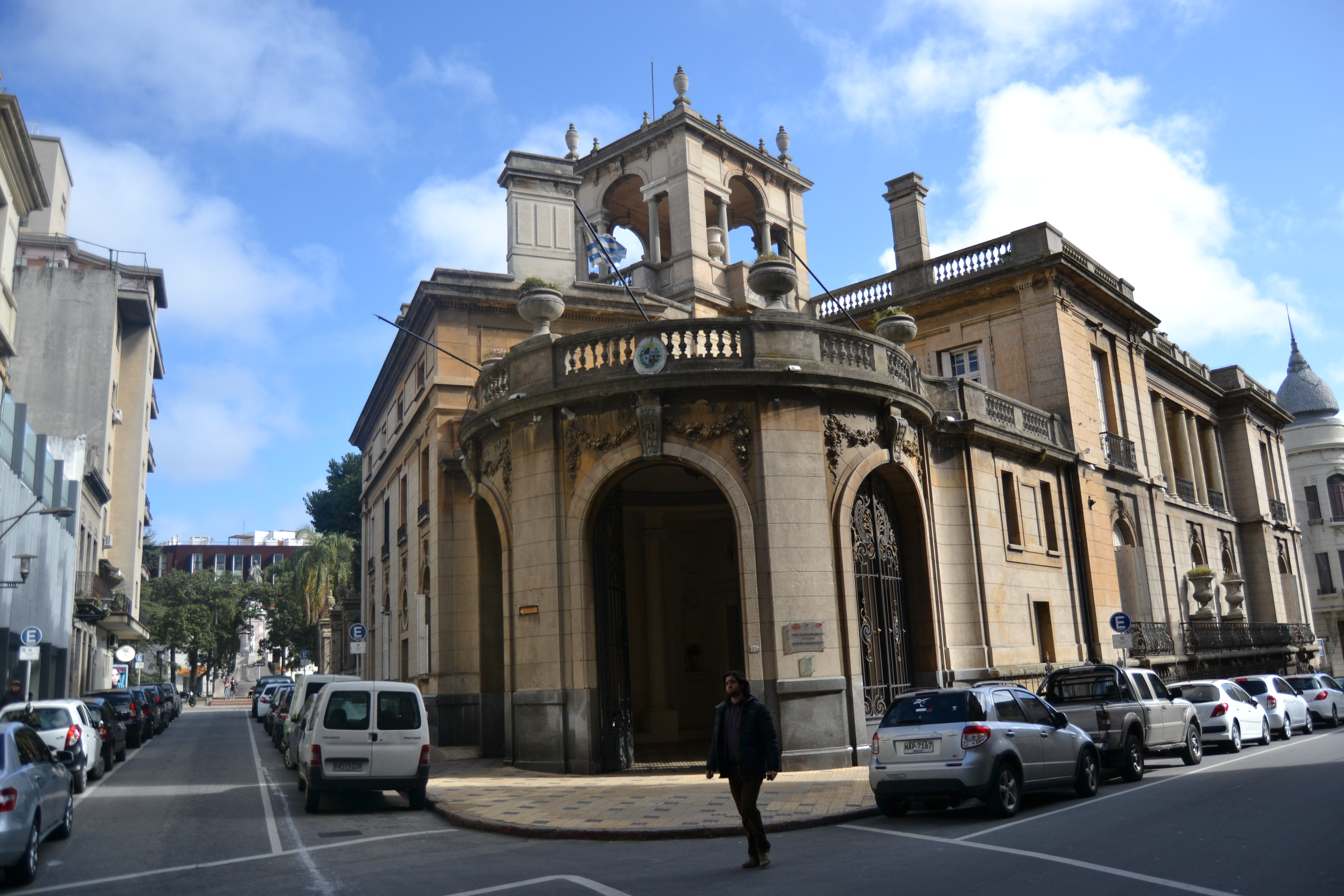
Palacio Taranco, Montevideo
