= Hippodrome Wellington =

Horse racing track in Ostend, Belgium

Coordinates: 51.221185°N 2.896142°E

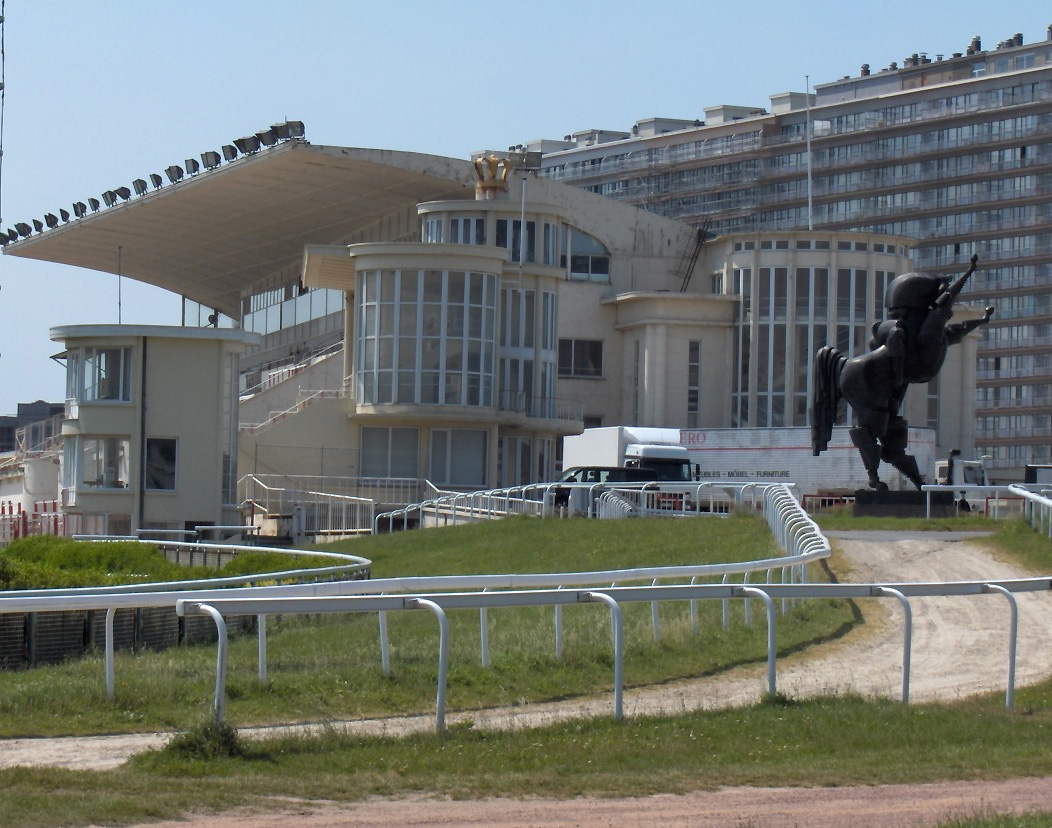
Hippodrome Wellington main stand

The Hippodrome Wellington (also Wellingtonrenbaan) is a horse racing track in Ostend in the Flemish Region of Belgium built in 1883, renovated in 2011 and named after Arthur Wellesley, 1st Duke of Wellington.

The facility hosts both harness and flat racing events. Starting at the end of June, there's a race day every Monday (until September). Notable among its flat races for Thoroughbred horses was the Grand Prix Prince Rose held annually in July on the Nationale feestdag. Formerly known as the Grand International d'Ostende, it was renamed to honor the great Belgian horse, Prince Rose.

The venue hosted concerts by artists like Michael Jackson (1997), David Bowie (2002) and Bon Jovi (2003) and the 2001 IAAF World Cross Country Championships

In 2004 the center of the race track was converted into a golf course named Wellington Golf Oostende.. It holds 4 golf holes of the total of 9. he golf course is closed on race days.

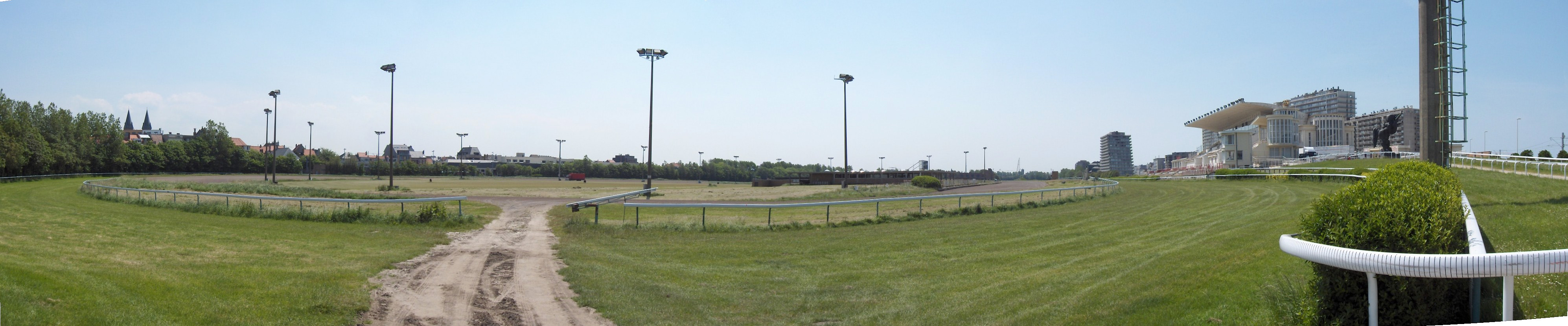
Panoramic view of the racetrack. Note the Residentie Royal Ascot in the background

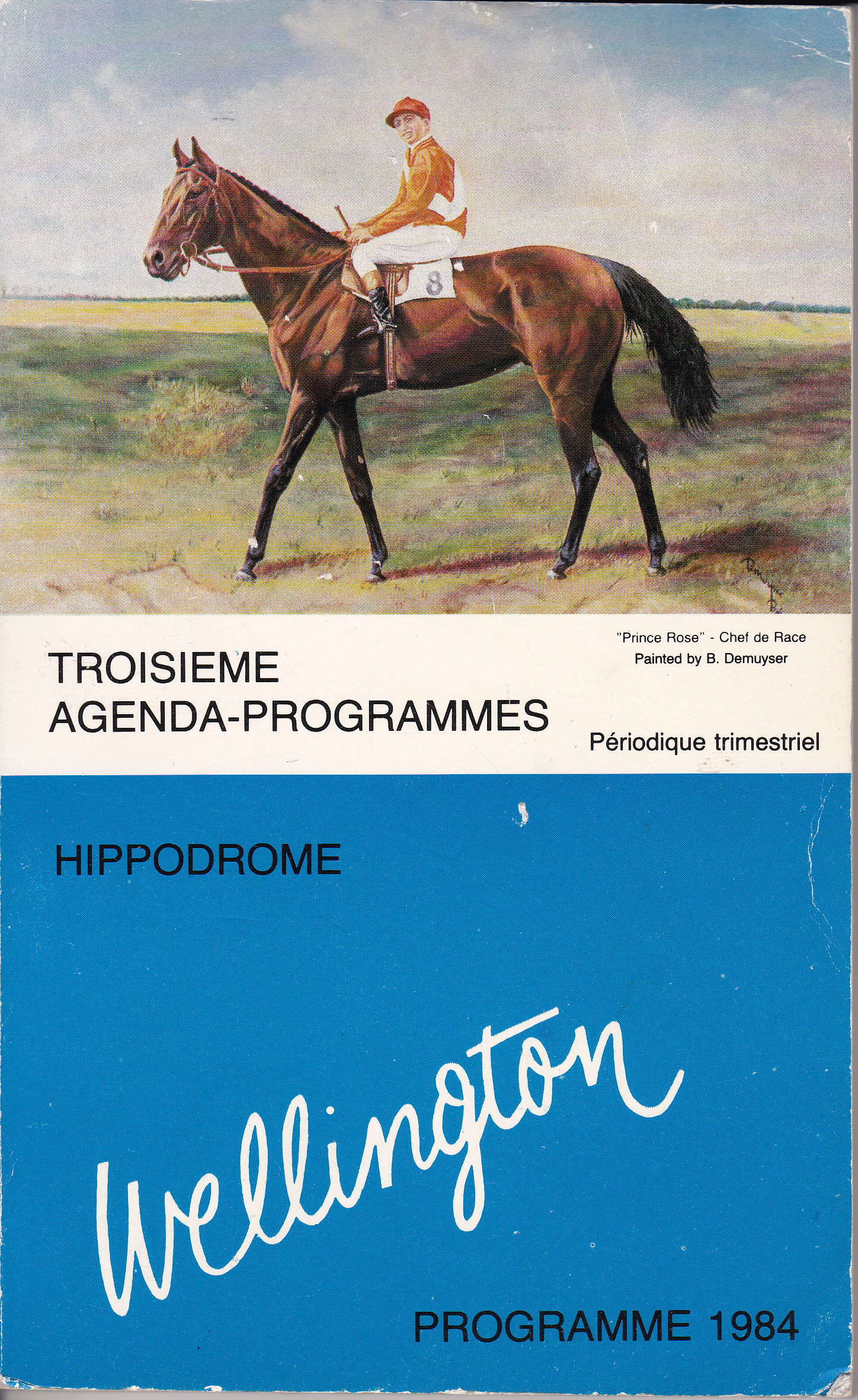
Prince Rose (Hervé Denaigre), painted by Bob Demuyser (1920–2003)

The Royal Galleries of Ostend were built to link the track to King Leopold II of Belgium's villa, allowing the king and his guests to travel between the two without being inconvenienced by rain or wind.

On 3 September 1997, American pop-star Michael Jackson gave here a concert as part of his HIStory World Tour. It was dedicated to Princess Diana, who died 4 days earlier on 31 August 1997.

The racecourse and part of the nearby beach have occasionally been used for cyclo-cross races, including the 2021 UCI Cyclo-cross World Championships.

== Film shot at the Hippodrome Wellington ==
- 1996: Camping Cosmos directed by Jan Bucquoy (Jockey sequence)
