= Grand Prix de la Ville de Nice =

- Class: Group 3
- Location: Hippodrome de la Côte d'Azur, Cagnes-sur-Mer France
- Race type: Steeple chase / Thoroughbred

Race information
- Distance: 4,600 metres
- Track: Left-handed
- Qualification: Five-year-olds and older
- Purse: €140,000

The Grand Prix de la Ville de Nice is a steeplechase race reserved for Group 3 five-year-olds and older. This test is run over a distance of 4,600 metres and takes place in January on the racetrack of Cagnes-sur-Mer. The current purse is €140,000.

== See also ==
- Cagnes-sur-Mer
- Hippodrome de la Côte d'Azur
