= Prince Rose =

British-bred Thoroughbred racehorse

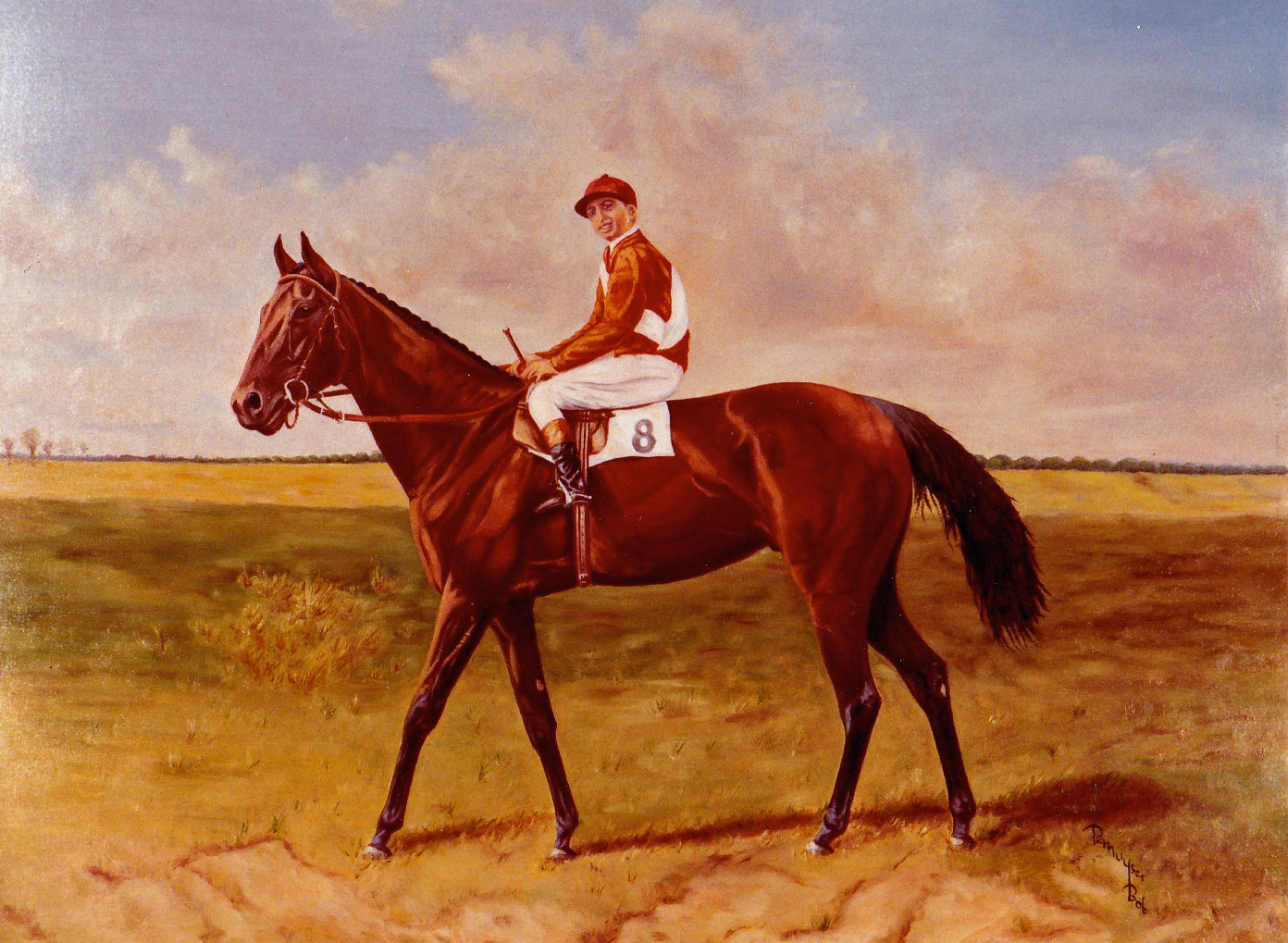
- Prince Rose (Hervé Denaigre), oil on canvas painted by Bob Demuyser (1920–2003)
- Sire: Rose Prince
- Grandsire: Prince Palatine
- Dam: Indolence
- Damsire: Gay Crusader
- Sex: Stallion
- Foaled: 1928
- Country: Great Britain
- Colour: Bay
- Breeder: Lord Durham
- Owner: Henri Coppez
- Trainer: Not found
- Record: 20: 16–0–2
- Earnings: US$59,267 (equivalent)

Major wins
- Grand Prix de Bruxelles (1931); Grand International d'Ostende (1931 & 1932); Prix du President de la Republique (1932)

Awards
- Leading sire in France (1946)

Honours
- Grand Prix Prince Rose at Hippodrome Wellington
- Last updated on February 2, 2007

Prince Rose (1928–1944) was a British-bred, Belgian-trained Thoroughbred racehorse, often referred to as the best horse in Belgian racing.

== Background ==
Bred in England by Lord Durham, Prince Rose was sired by Rose Prince out of the mare Indolence. His grandsire was Prince Palatine, a two-time British Horse of the Year and his damsire was Gay Crusader, winner of the 1917 English Triple Crown.

The Earl of Durham died in 1929 and his estate sold Prince Rose to Belgian ophthalmologist Henri Coppez (1869–1946) who brought him to Belgium.

== Racing career ==
At age three, Prince Rose won the Grand Prix de Bruxelles, beat the great French filly Pearl Cap in the Grand International d'Ostende then was third to her in the 1931 Prix de l'Arc de Triomphe. In 1932, Prince Rose won the Prix du President de la Republique at Hippodrome de Saint-Cloud.

== Stud record ==
Retired to stud duty after winning sixteen races in twenty starts, Prince Rose sired seven offspring in Belgium before being sent to the Haras de Cheffreville breeding Farm in France in 1938 where he would produce another thirty-five.

Foaled	Name	Sex	Major Wins/Achievements
1940	Princequillo	Stallion	
1941	Prince Bio	Stallion	Prix Noailles (1944), Poule d'Essai des Poulains
1943	Prince Chevalier	Stallion	

However, most important for horse racing in the United States, in 1939 Prince Rose had been mated with the mare Cosquilla who, because of the onset of World War II, was shipped to safety in Ireland. There, Cosquilla foaled Princequillo who would eventually be sent to race in the U.S. and would become a very influential stallion. Prince Rose was killed by a bombing at his box door in August 1944.

== Legacy ==
Prince Rose is the grandsire of the U.S. Champion filly Misty Morn and U.S. Racing Hall of Fame colts Hill Prince and Round Table. Other important descendants of Prince Rose include Mill Reef, Fort Marcy, Sham, 1973 U.S. Triple Crown champion Secretariat, and All Along.

== Honours ==
The Grand International d'Ostende at Hippodrome Wellington in Ostend was renamed the Grand Prix Prince Rose in his honor.

== Sire line tree ==
- Prince Rose
  - Joli Ange
  - Pappageno
  - Princequillo
    - Hill Prince
      - Royal Living
    - Prince Simon
    - Prince Regent
    - Prince Hill
    - Dedicate
    - Prince John
      - Speak John
        - Verbatim
        - Hold Your Peace
        - Text
      - Stage Door Johnny
        - One On The Aisle
        - Johnny D
        - Johnnys Image
        - Open Call
        - Southern Sultan
      - Silent Screen
      - Protagonist
      - Lefty
      - Transworld
        - The Hague
        - Winton
        - Lonesome Glory
    - Round Table
      - Baldric
        - Without Fear
        - Irish Ball
        - Kyoei Promise
      - Duel
      - Advocator
      - He's A Smoothie
      - Poker
      - Table Play
        - Telescopio
      - Dignitas
      - King's Bishop
      - Upper Case
      - Royal Glint
      - Targowice
        - McAdam
        - Prince Mab
        - Tipperary Fixer
        - Let's Go Tarquin
      - Apalachee
        - High Counsel
        - K One King
      - Cellini
      - Flirting Around
        - Wolf Power
      - King Pellinore
      - Easy Gallop
        - Uncle Merlin
      - Take Your Place
      - Artaius
        - Osumi Roch
      - Banquet Table
    - Prince Blessed
      - Old Bob Bowers
        - John Henry
    - Brave Lad
    - Earldom
  - Prince Bio
    - Sicambre
      - Sertorius
      - Shantung
        - Felicio
      - Celtic Ash
        - Celtic Cone
        - Athens Wood
        - Hoche
      - Pharamond
      - Tiziano
      - Moutiers
      - Cambremont
      - Diatome
      - Phaeton
        - Vitiges
      - Roi Dagobert
        - Wittgenstein
        - On The Sly
        - Abary
      - Sacramento Song
        - Sandro
        - Sacramento Son
        - Symphatico
    - Northern Light
    - Le Petit Prince
    - Prince Taj
      - Aztec
      - Morgex
    - Sedan
    - Montigny
      - Viscount
      - Duc De Ferce
        - Norton De Rhuys
  - Prince Chevalier
    - Arctic Prince
      - Arctic Explorer
      - Exar
        - Tatti Jacopo
    - Pirate King
      - Random Shot
        - Garrison Savannah
    - Pampered King
      - Kings Sprite
      - David Jack
        - Davy Lad
      - Deep Run
    - Court Harwell
      - Master Stephen
        - Master Smudge
      - Derek H
        - Aldaniti
      - Harwell
        - King Spruce
        - Corbiere
      - Meadow Court
    - Doutelle
      - Canisbay
        - Orange Bay
      - Pretendre
        - Canonero
        - Suffolk
    - Charlottesville
      - Charlottown
      - Pigalle
      - Stratford
      - Canterbury
      - Bonconte Di Montefeltro
      - Magna Carta
      - Biskra
      - Jefferson
        - Son of Love
      - Saunter
        - Winsome Andante
    - Soltikoff

== Pedigree ==
Pedigree of Prince Rose, bay stallion, 1928
Sire Rose Prince	Prince Palatine	Persimmon	St Simon
Sire Rose Prince	Prince Palatine	Persimmon	Perdita
Sire Rose Prince	Prince Palatine	Lady Lightfoot	Isinglass
Sire Rose Prince	Prince Palatine	Lady Lightfoot	Glare
Sire Rose Prince	Eglantine	Perth	War Dance
Sire Rose Prince	Eglantine	Perth	Primrose Dame
Sire Rose Prince	Eglantine	Rose de Mai	Callistrate
Sire Rose Prince	Eglantine	Rose de Mai	May Pole
Dam Indolence	Gay Crusader	Bayardo	Bay Ronald
Dam Indolence	Gay Crusader	Bayardo	Galicia
Dam Indolence	Gay Crusader	Gay Laura	Beppo
Dam Indolence	Gay Crusader	Gay Laura	Galeottia
Dam Indolence	Barrier	Grey Leg	Pepper and Salt
Dam Indolence	Barrier	Grey Leg	Quetta
Dam Indolence	Barrier	Bar the Way	Right-Away
Dam Indolence	Barrier	Bar the Way	Barrisdale (family: 10-c)
