= Magnolia Stakes =

Flat horse race in Britain

- Class: Listed
- Location: Kempton Park
- Race type: Flat / Thoroughbred
- Sponsor: Ladbrokes Coral
- Website: Kempton Park

Race information
- Distance: 1 mile 2 furlongs
- Surface: Polytrack
- Track: Right-handed
- Qualification: Four-years-old and up
- Weight: 9 st 0 lb Allowances; 5 lb for fillies and mares Penalties; 7 lb for Group 1 or Group 2 winners * 5 lb for Group 3 winners * 3 lb for Listed winners * * after 31 August 2020

Magnolia Stakes
2026
| Gethin | Devil's Advocate | Muddy Mooy |

Previous years
2025
Military Order | Exoplanet | Teumessias Fox
2024
Dubai Honour | Okeechobee | Lion's Pride
2023
Foxes Tales | Rogue Millennium | Phantom Flight
2022
Living Legend | Al Zaraqaan | Chichester
2021
Global Giant | Stormy Antarctic | Faylaq

2020-2011
2019
Mootasadir | Extra Elusive | Master The World
2018
Fabricate | Autocratic | Snowy Winter
2017
Absolute Blast | Linguistic | Sovereign Debt
2016
Our Channel | Noble Gift | Maybelater
2015
Romsdal | Afonso De Sousa | Solar Deity
2014
Contributer | Modernstone | Squire Osbaldeston
2013
Miblish | Burano | Genzy
2012
Arctic Cosmos | Tinshu | Hurricane Higgins
2011
Shamali | Resentful Angel | Pink Symphony

2010-2001
2010
South Easter | Safari Sunup | December Draw
2009
Dansant | Kandidate | Bronze Cannon
2008
Kandidate | Illustrious Blue | Spice Route
2007
Imperial Star | Grand Passion | Charlie Cool
2006
Simple Exchange | Kew Green | Near Dock
2005
Day Flight | Blythe Knight | Red Lancer
2004
Scott's View | Bustan | Island House
2003
Parasol | Nysaean | Bourgainville
1998
Garuda | Ukraine Venture | Star Précision
2002
Border Arrow | Chianti | Soviet Flash
2001
Border Arrow | Pawn Broker | Mubtaker

2000-1991
2000
Right Wing | Sweet Sorrow | Zaajer
1999
Generous Rosi | Shaya | Dynamism
1998
Garuda | Ukraine Venture | Star Precision
1997
Dr Massini | Germano | Proper Blue
1996
Lucky Di | Star Selection | Captain Horatius
1995
Captain Horatius | Golden Ball | Young Buster
1994
Wootton Rivers | Captain Horatius | Highland Dress
1993
Captain Horatius | Half A Tick | Caspian Tern
1992
Red Bishop | Crystal Path | Ile De Chypre
1991
Noble Patriarch | Indian Queen | Landyap

1990-1988
1990
Batshoof | Marine Diver | Jehol
1989
Per Quod | Riverhead | Pelorus
1988
Golden Braid | Mccubbin | Our Eliaso

The Magnolia Stakes is a Listed flat horse race in Great Britain open to horses aged four years or older. It is run at Kempton Park over a distance of 1 mile 1 furlong and 219 yards (2,011 metres), and it is scheduled to take place each year in late March or early April. It was switched to Kempton's newly opened all-weather track in 2006.

From 1994 to 2007 the race took place during the Easter weekend. It is now usually run at a Saturday meeting held either side of Easter, on the same day as the Rosebery Handicap.

== Winners ==
| Year | Winner | Age | Jockey | Trainer | Time |
|---|---|---|---|---|---|
| 1987 | Rana Pratap | 7 | Greville Starkey | Geoff Lewis | 2:21:59 |
| 1988 | Golden Braid | 4 | John Matthias | Ian Balding | 2:09.79 |
| 1989 | Per Quod | 4 | Bruce Raymond | Ben Hanbury | 2:17.88 |
| 1990 | Batshoof | 4 | Pat Eddery | Ben Hanbury | 1:59.53 |
| 1991 | Noble Patriarch | 4 | John Reid | John Dunlop | 2:12.70 |
| 1992 | Red Bishop | 4 | Steve Cauthen | John Gosden | 2:11.15 |
| 1993 | Captain Horatius | 4 | John Reid | John Dunlop | 2:12.31 |
| 1994 | Wootton Rivers | 4 | Michael Hills | Peter Chapple-Hyam | 2:23.23 |
| 1995 | Captain Horatius | 6 | Walter Swinburn | John Dunlop | 2:02.46 |
| 1996 | Lucky Di | 4 | Michael Hills | Luca Cumani | 2:06.24 |
| 1997 | Dr Massini | 4 | John Reid | Michael Stoute | 2:06.83 |
| 1998 | Garuda | 4 | Pat Eddery | John Dunlop | 2:17.80 |
| 1999 | Generous Rosi | 4 | Kieren Fallon | John Dunlop | 2:04.41 |
| 2000 | Right Wing | 6 | Pat Eddery | John Dunlop | 2:13.71 |
| 2001 | Border Arrow | 6 | Kieren Fallon | Ian Balding | 2:17.42 |
| 2002 | Border Arrow | 7 | Kieren Fallon | Ian Balding | 2:06.27 |
| 2003 | Parasol | 4 | Frankie Dettori | David Loder | 2:04.49 |
| 2004 | Scott's View | 5 | Stanley Chin | Mark Johnston | 2:07.53 |
| 2005 | Day Flight | 4 | Richard Hughes | John Gosden | 2:08.07 |
| 2006 | Simple Exchange | 5 | Robert Winston | Dermot Weld | 2:08.35 |
| 2007 | Imperial Star | 4 | Jimmy Fortune | John Gosden | 2:07.40 |
| 2008 | Kandidate | 6 | Neil Callan | Clive Brittain | 2:03.77 |
| 2009 | Dansant | 5 | Eddie Ahern | Gerard Butler | 2:06.85 |
| 2010 | South Easter | 4 | Liam Jones | William Haggas | 2:05.90 |
| 2011 | Shamali | 6 | Eddie Ahern | William Haggas | 2:04.62 |
| 2012 | Arctic Cosmos | 5 | William Buick | John Gosden | 2:04.15 |
| 2013 | Miblish | 4 | Freddie Tylicki | Clive Brittain | 2:04.18 |
| 2014 | Contributor | 4 | George Baker | Ed Dunlop | 2:06.89 |
| 2015 | Romsdal | 4 | Nicky Mackay | John Gosden | 2:04.99 |
| 2016 | Our Channel | 5 | Pat Cosgrave | William Haggas | 2:05.08 |
| 2017 | Absolute Blast | 5 | Luke Morris | Archie Watson | 2:05.72 |
| 2018 | Fabricate | 6 | Andrea Atzeni | Michael Bell | 2:06.97 |
| 2019 | Mootasadir | 4 | Ben Curtis | Hugo Palmer | 2:03.03 |
| | no race 2020 (Note: The 2020 running was cancelled because of the COVID-19 pandemic in the United Kingdom) |
| 2021 | Global Giant | 6 | Robert Havlin | John and Thady Gosden | 2:05.39 |
| 2022 | Living Legend | 6 | Joe Fanning | Mark and Charlie Johnston | 2:04.52 |
| 2023 | Foxes Tales | 5 | Oisin Murphy | Andrew Balding | 2:04.69 |
| 2024 | Dubai Honour | 6 | Ryan Moore | William Haggas | 2:05.19 |
| 2025 | Military Order | 5 | William Buick | Charlie Appleby | 2:04.92 |
| 2026 | Gethin | 4 | Callum Rodriguez | Owen Burrows | 2:03.65 |

== See also ==
- Horse racing in Great Britain
- List of British flat horse races
