= Royal Galleries of Ostend =

Historical building in Belgium

Royal Galleries
- Koninklijke Gaanderijen (in Dutch)
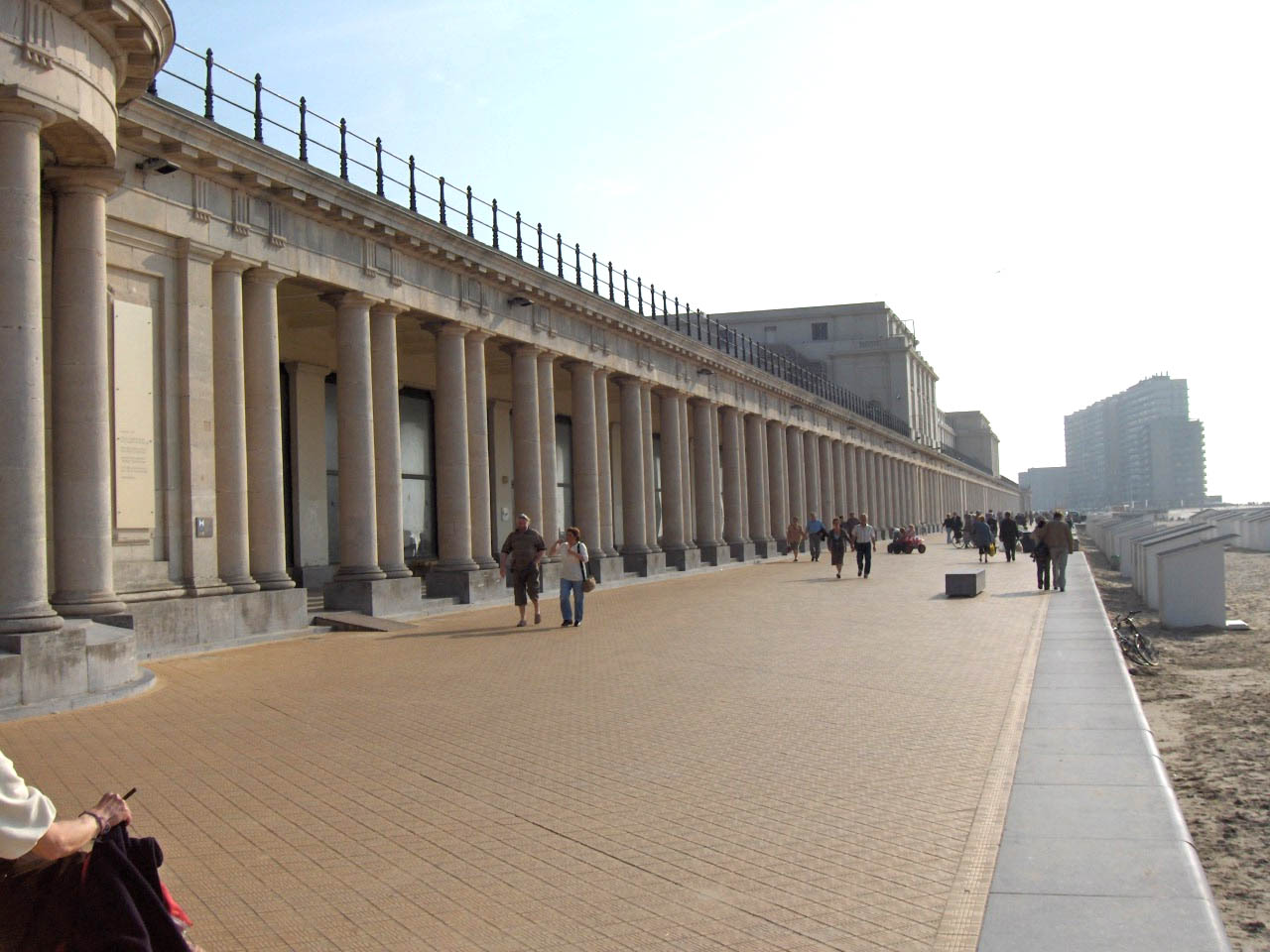
- Interactive map of the Royal Galleries area

General information
- Architectural style: Neoclassical
- Location: Ostend, Belgium
- Coordinates: 51°13′34″N 2°54′08″E
- Construction started: 1902
- Completed: 1906

Dimensions
- Other dimensions: 381.8 metres (1,253 ft) long

Design and construction
- Architect: Charles Girault

The Royal Galleries of Ostend (Dutch: Koninklijke Gaanderijen) are a seaside neoclassical arcade on a dike on the beach of Ostend, Belgium. They extend from the royal villa in the east to the Hippodrome Wellington horse racing track in the west. The galleries are over 380 metres (1,250 ft) long, with a large pavilion at each end. The luxury Thermae Palace Hotel sits atop the central section.

== History ==
The Royal Galleries were constructed between 1902 and 1906 following the plans of architect Charles Girault on the orders of King Leopold II of Belgium. They allowed the king and his guests to pass from the royal villa on the beach to the racetrack without being inconvenienced by rain or wind. The galleries show Leopold's attachment to Ostend, his favourite resort, and some charged him with neglecting Brussels, the capital, in favour of Ostend. The king followed the construction closely, personally visiting on 25 February 1905. It was built with the allowance that the city of Ostend received in 1902 as compensation for the ban on gambling.

There were originally wrought iron grilles between the columns, though these were melted down in the First World War. During the German occupation of Belgium during World War II, the galleries were walled off along their entire length, making them a link in Hitler's Atlantic Wall.

The paintings were a frequent subject of the works of the Ostend symbolist painter Léon Spilliaert.

The Royal Galleries were listed as a protected monument on 22 September 1981.

== Architecture ==
The galleries contain a great number of paired Tuscan order columns, with each pair sharing a bluestone pedestal, and each column has a simple torus at its base. The columns support an entablature composed of a bare architrave, a frieze adorned with triglyphs above each column, and a moulded cornice that projects strongly out of the wall supported by flat rectangular corbels.

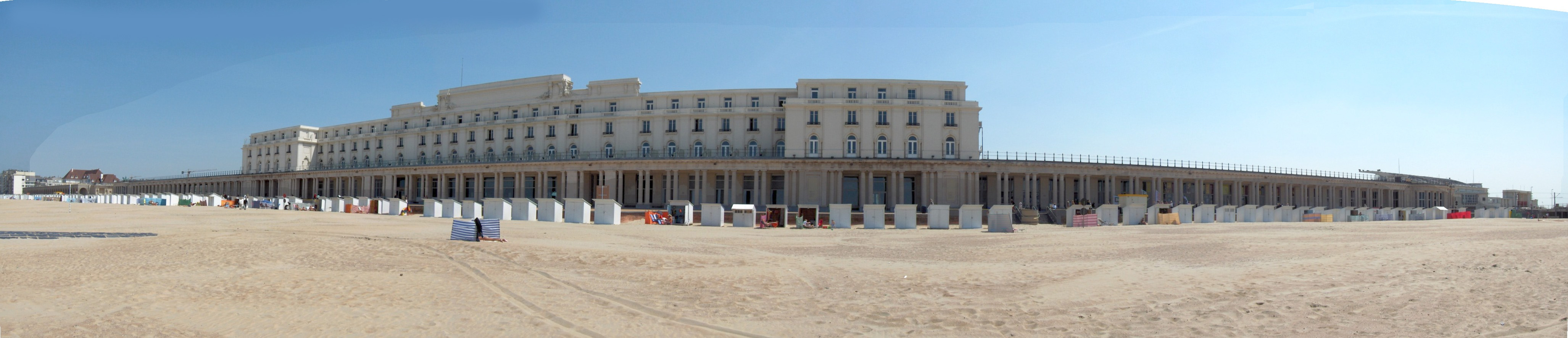
Panorama of the Royal Galleries and the Thermae Palace Hotel, seen from the beach

== See also ==
- Ostend
- Hippodrome Wellington horse racing track
- Charles Girault
- Leopold II of Belgium
