= Hippodrome de la Côte d'Azur =

Coordinates: 43.6488°N 7.1451°E

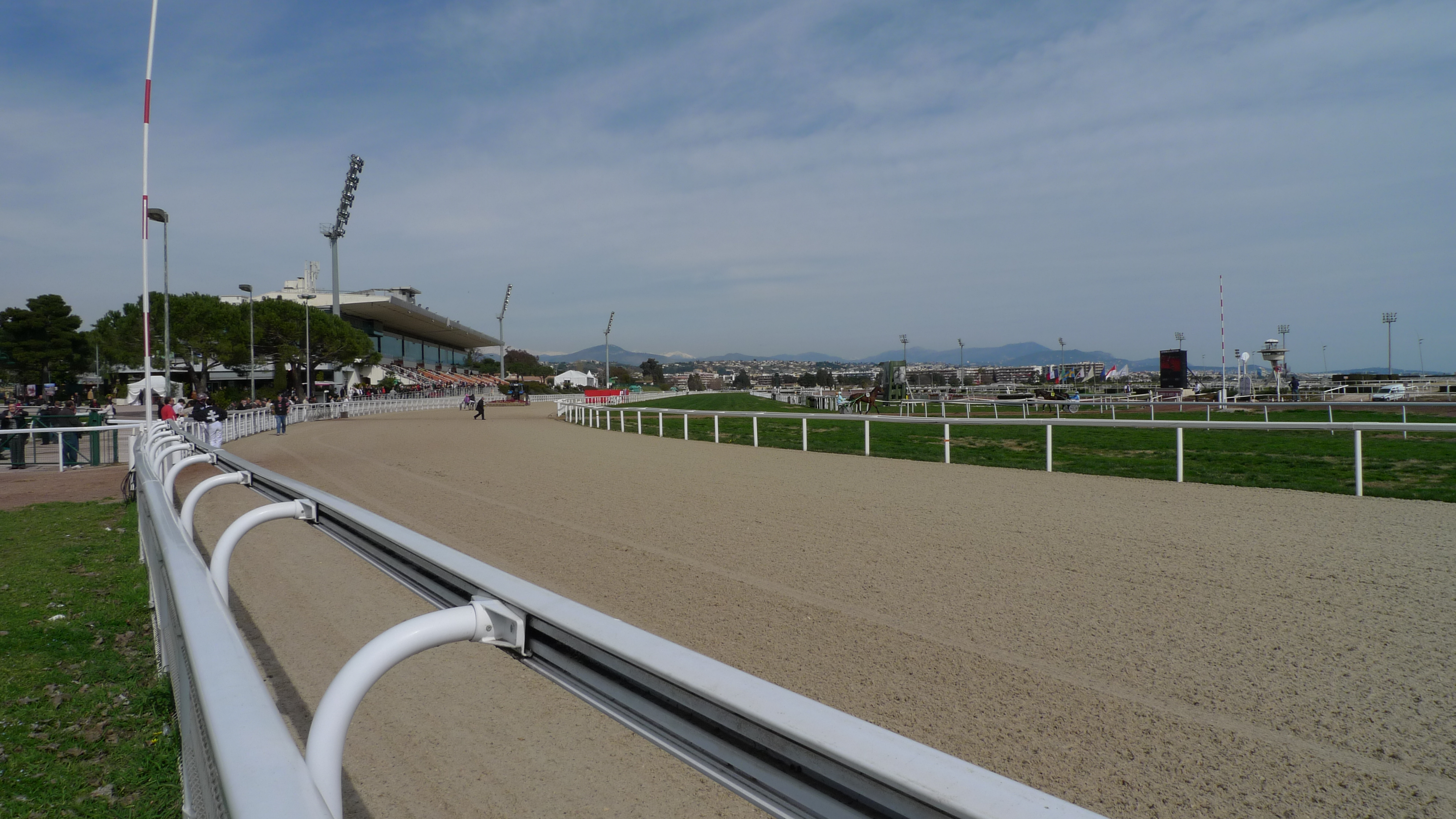
- Location: Cagnes-sur-Mer, France
- Inaugurated: 1952 (74 years ago)
- Website: http://www.hippodrome-cotedazur.fr/fr/

Race information
- Surface: Dirt
- Track: Left-handed

The Hippodrome de la Côte d'Azur is a racecourse which is located in the town of Cagnes-sur-Mer. It opened with temporary facilities in 1952, and was officially opened in December 1960. The most prestigious trotting race is the Grand Criterium speed of the Riviera, which is one of the great classics of trotting season Europe.
