= HORAL =

The High Council for Artisanal Lambic Beers (Dutch: Hoge Raad voor Ambachtelijke Lambiekbieren, HORAL) is a non-profit organisation that brings together the gueuze brewers and blenders of the Pajottenland and Zenne Valley in Belgium.

== Goals ==
The stated goals of HORAL are:

- To promote artisanal lambic beers and their derivates, with attention to the complete process from brewing process till serving.
- To report irregularities with regard to artisanal lambic beers and their derivates.
- To take the necessary steps to protect artisanal lambic beers and their derivates.

== History ==
In January 1997, at the invitation of 3 Fonteinen's Armand Debelder, HORAL's founder members met in Beersel. HORAL was formally established with its original members: 3 Fonteinen, Boon, De Cam, De Troch, Lindemans, and Timmermans.

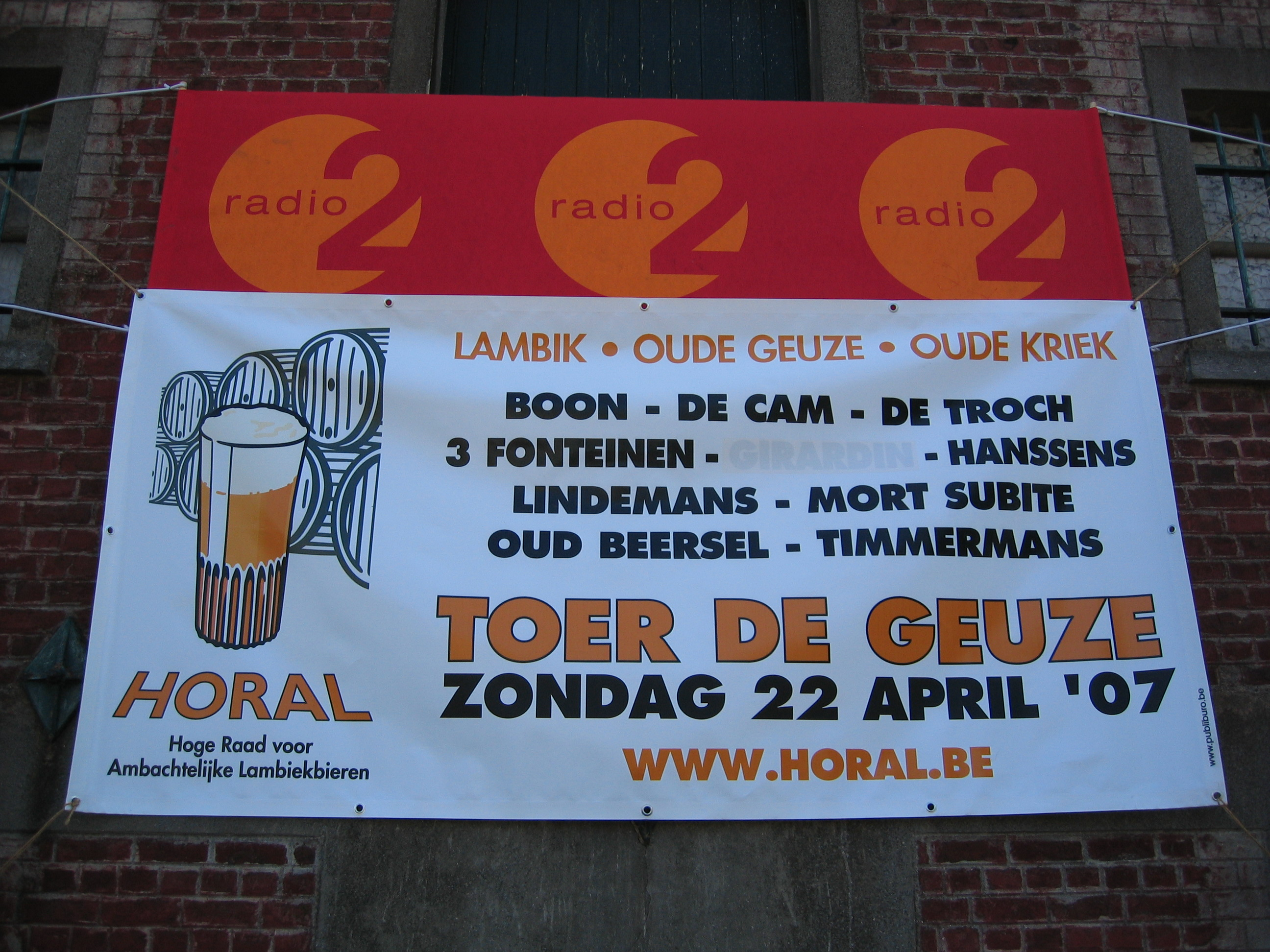
Horal's Toer de Geuze 2007

The first Toer de Geuze was organised on October 19 1997, when HORAL's member producers decided to open their doors to the public. Since then the open brewery day has become a biennial event. Over the past two decades, the Toer de Geuze has effectively become the largest beer event of Flemish Brabant. HORAL successfully campaigned for the creation of a European Union "traditional specialities guaranteed" (TSG) designation for the names "lambic" and "gueuze". This ensures that only products genuinely originating in the region are allowed to be identified as such in commerce. In 2016 HORAL met with representatives of Jester King Brewery to discuss a disagreement over the Americans' use of the term Méthode Gueuze. It was agreed that the Texan brewers would in future use the designation Méthode Traditionnelle as a style name.

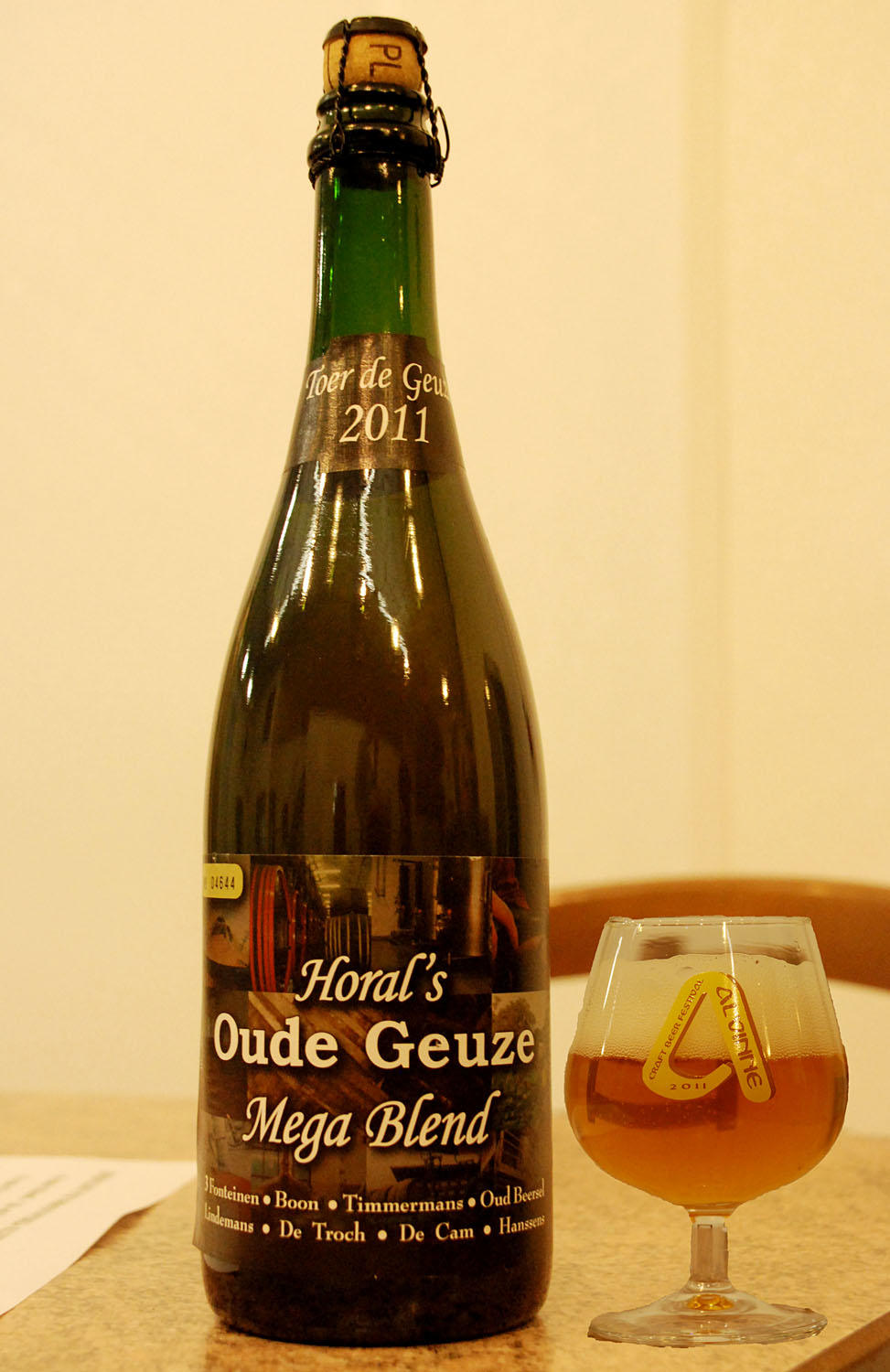
Horal's Oude Geuze Megablend

HORAL's Megablend Oude Gueuze was first brought to the market in 2009. It is a blend of old and young lambics from HORAL's members. A gueuze enthusiast from Great Britain paid 300 EUR for the first bottle in 2015.

In 2018 lambic producers Girardin and 3 Fonteinen left HORAL. Werner Van Obberghen of 3 Fonteinen said: "We decided to leave HORAL because we could no longer agree with its current values.

Several mostly newly founded breweries joined HORAL in the years after: Lambiek Fabriek (Sint-Pieters-Leeuw) in 2020, brewery Den Herberg (Buizingen) in 2022, Eylenbosch (Zellik) in 2023, Kestemont (Sint-Gertrudis-Pede) in 2024 and Sako Brewery (Gooik) in 2026.

== Member producers ==
- Boon: Fonteinstraat 65, 1502 Lembeek
- De Cam: Dorpstraat 67A, 1755 Gooik
- Den Herberg: Octave de Kerchove d'Exaerdestraat 16, 1501 Buizingen
- De Troch: Langestraat 20, 1741 Wambeek
- Eylenbosch: Isidoor Crokaertstraat 167, 1731 Zellik
- Hanssens Artisanaal: Vroenenbosstraat 15/1, 1653 Dworp
- Kestemont: Isabellastraat 16, 1703 Sint-Gertrudis-Pede
- Lambiek Fabriek: Eugene Ghijsstraat 71, 1600 Sint-Pieters-Leeuw
- Lindemans: Lenniksebaan 1479, 1602 Vlezenbeek
- Mort Subite: Lierput 1, 1730 Asse
- Oud Beersel: Laarheidestraat 230, 1650 Beersel
- Sako Brewery: Koekoekstraat 33, 1755 Gooik
- Tilquin: Chaussée Maïeur Habils 110, 1430 Bierk (Rebecq)
- Timmermans: Kerkstraat 11, 1701 Itterbeek

== Gallery of HORAL members in Brabant ==
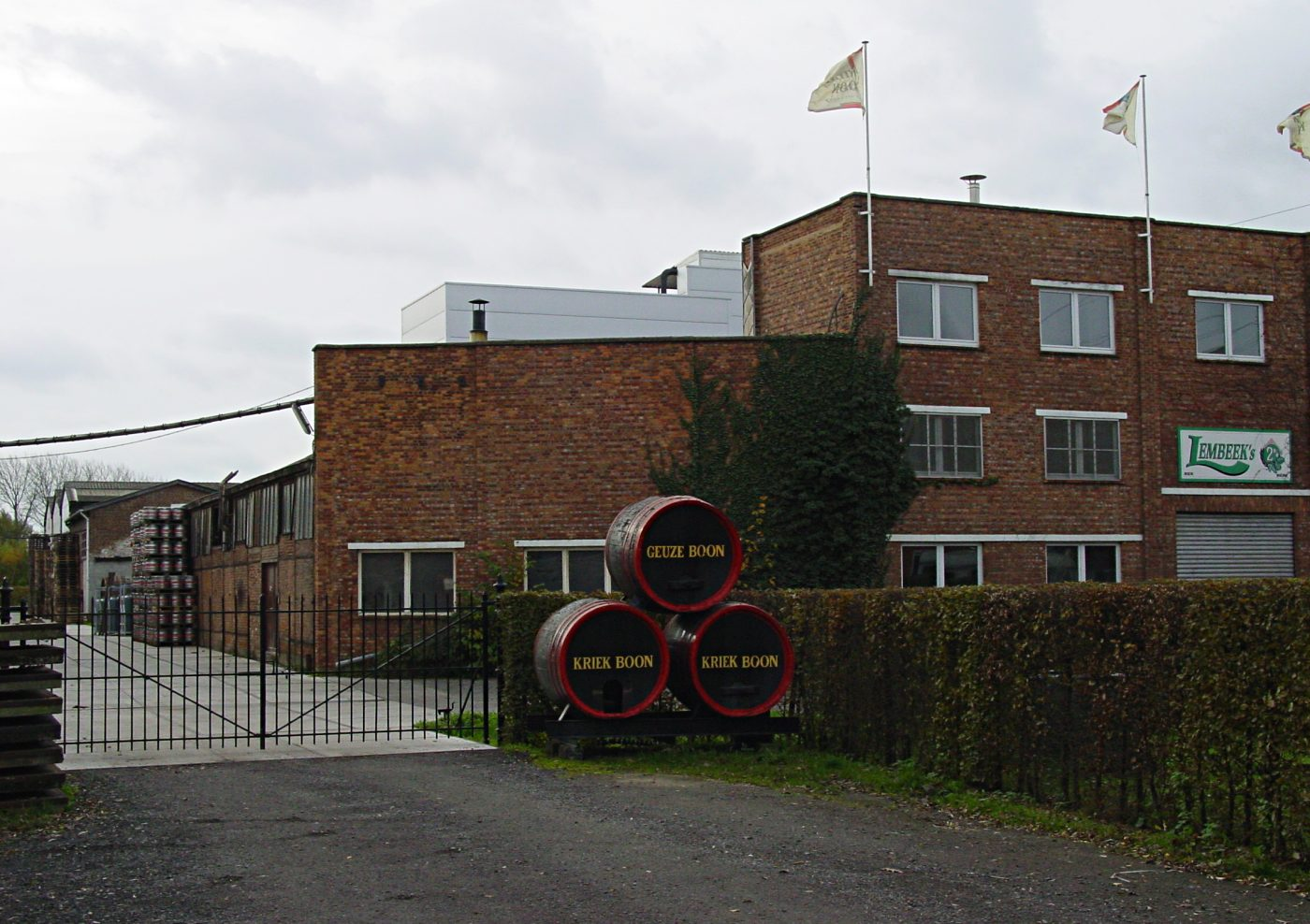
Brouwerij Boon
Lembeek

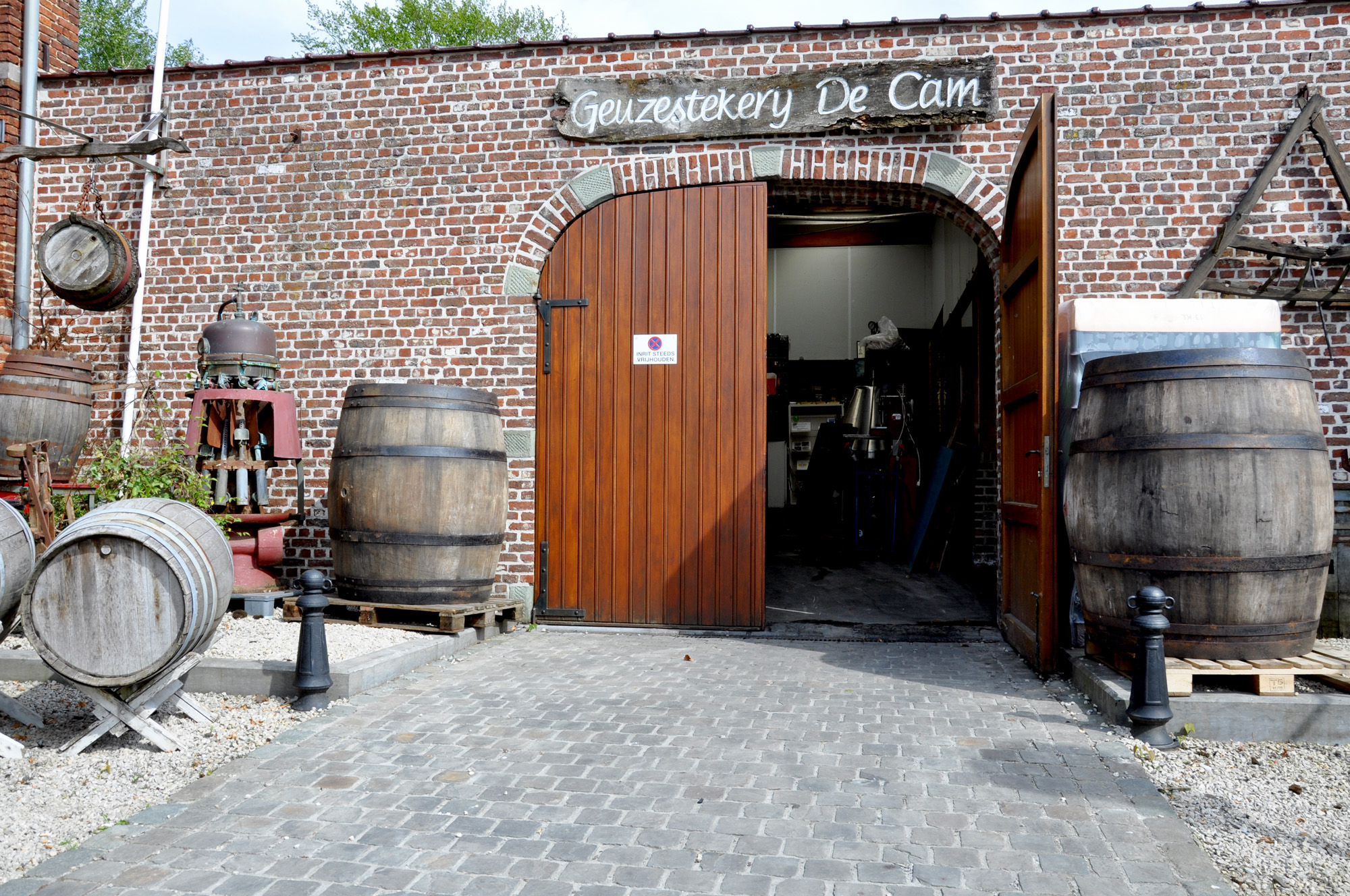
Geuzestekerij De Cam
Gooik

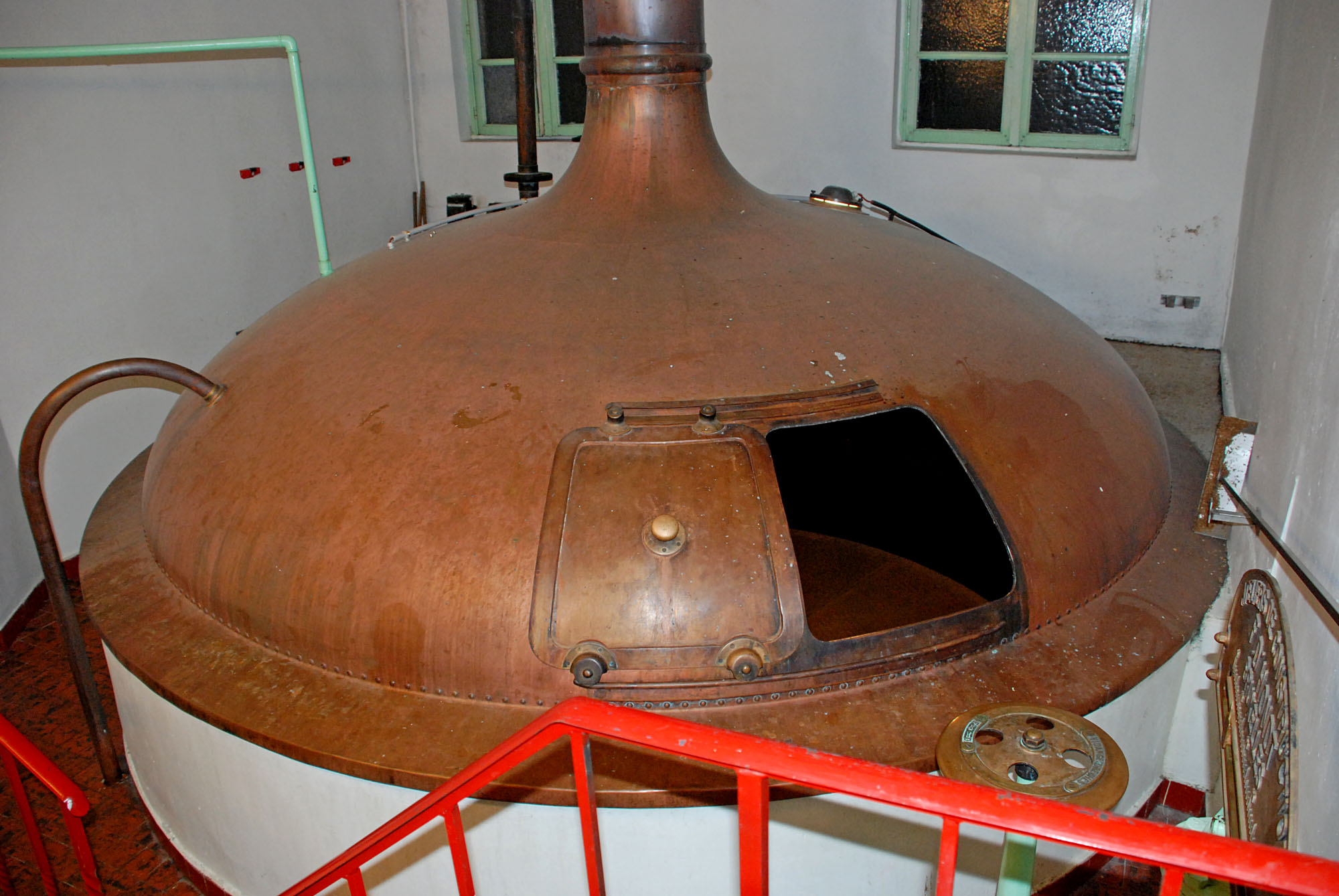
Brouwerij Timmermans
Itterbeek

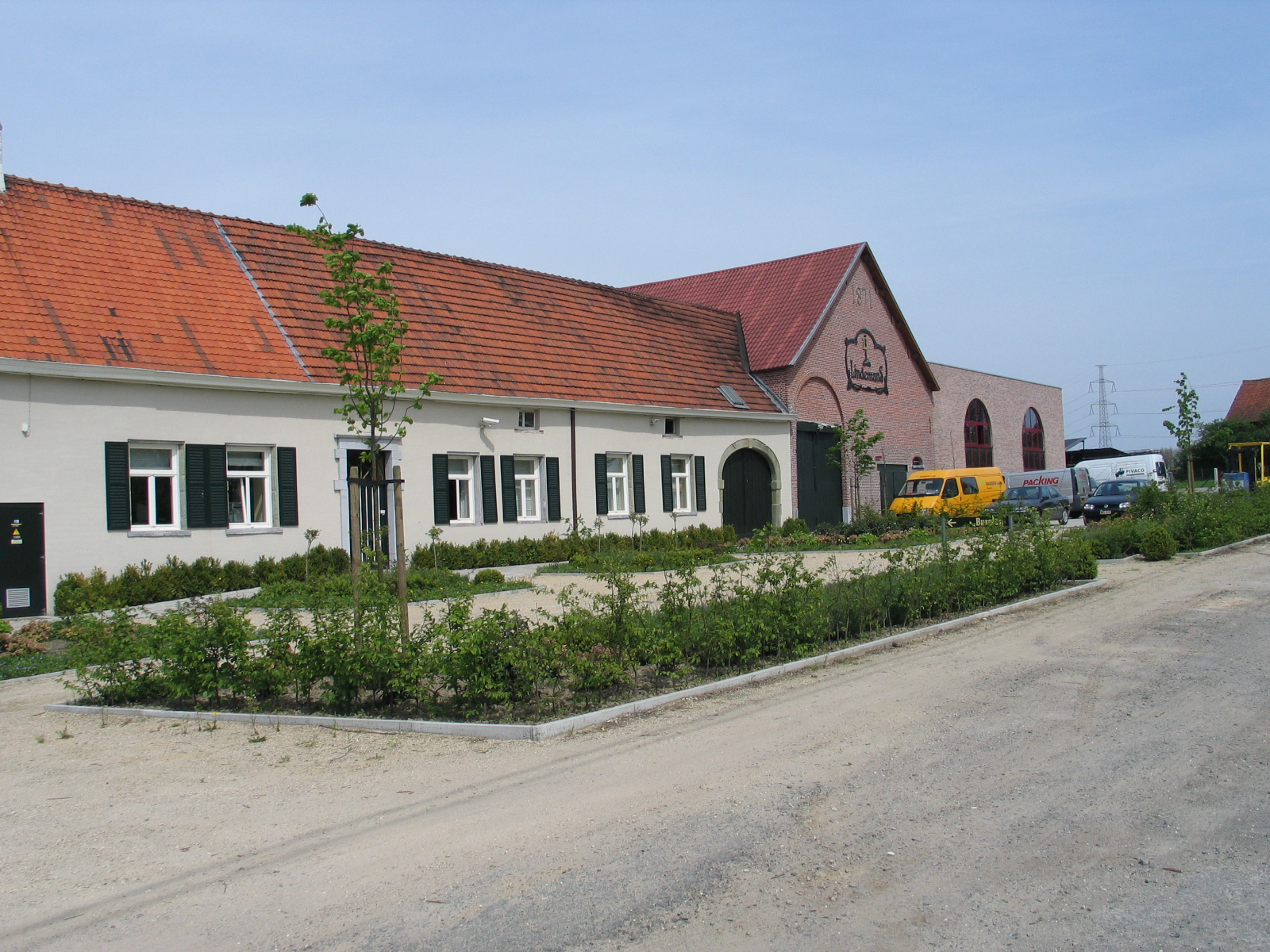
Brouwerij Lindemans
Vlezenbeek

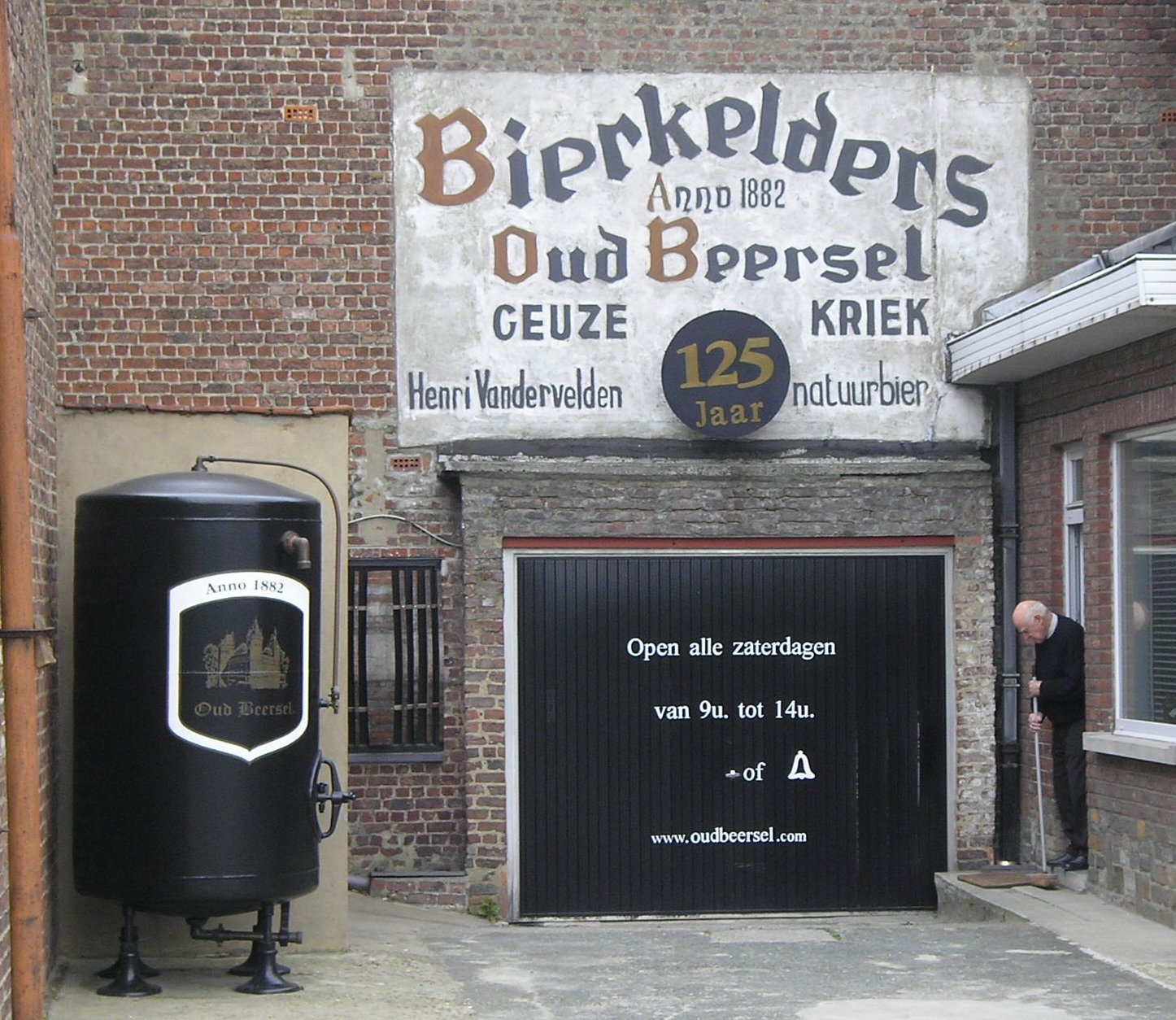
Brouwerij Oud Beersel
Beersel

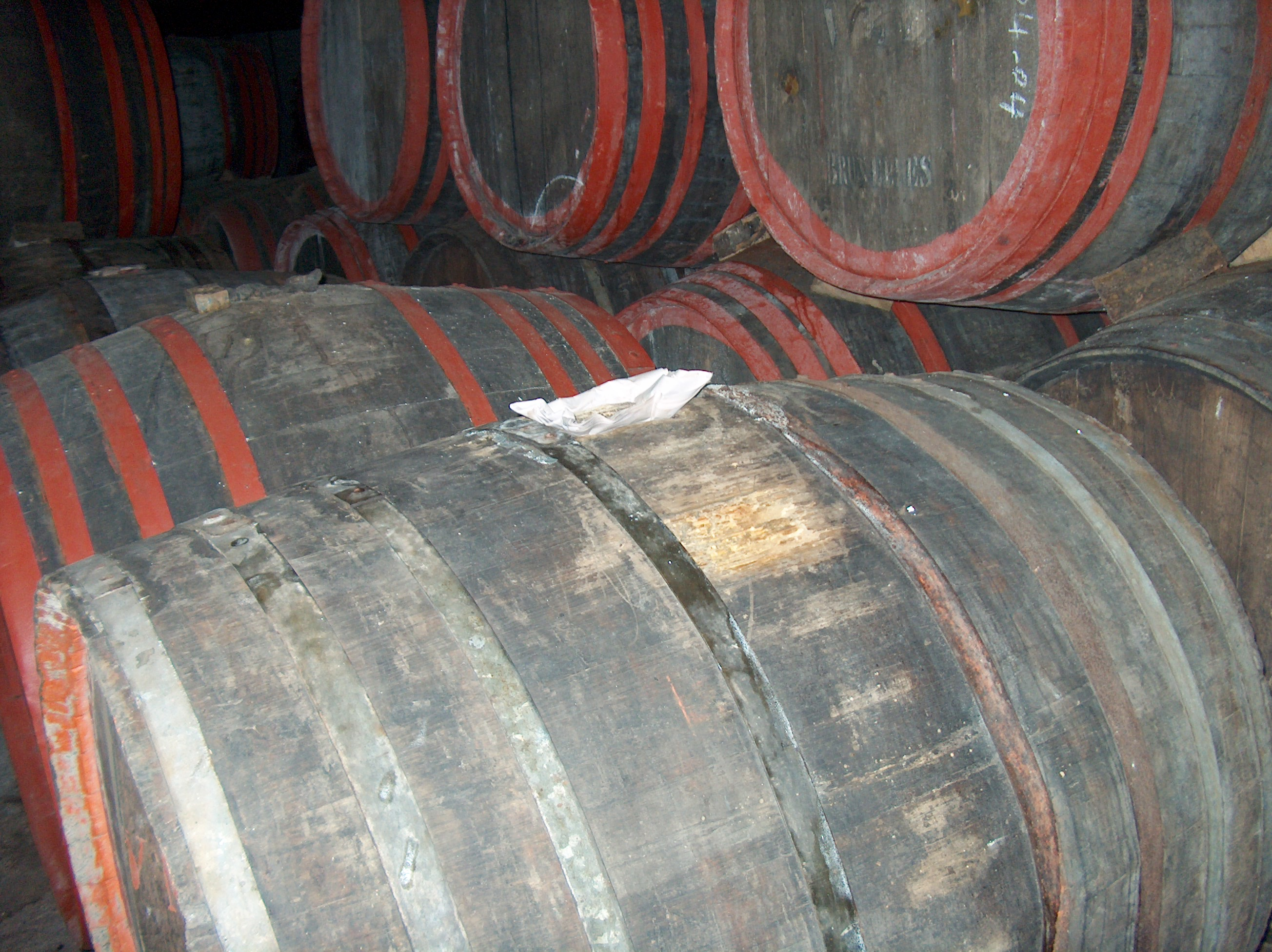
Hanssens Artisanaal
Dworp

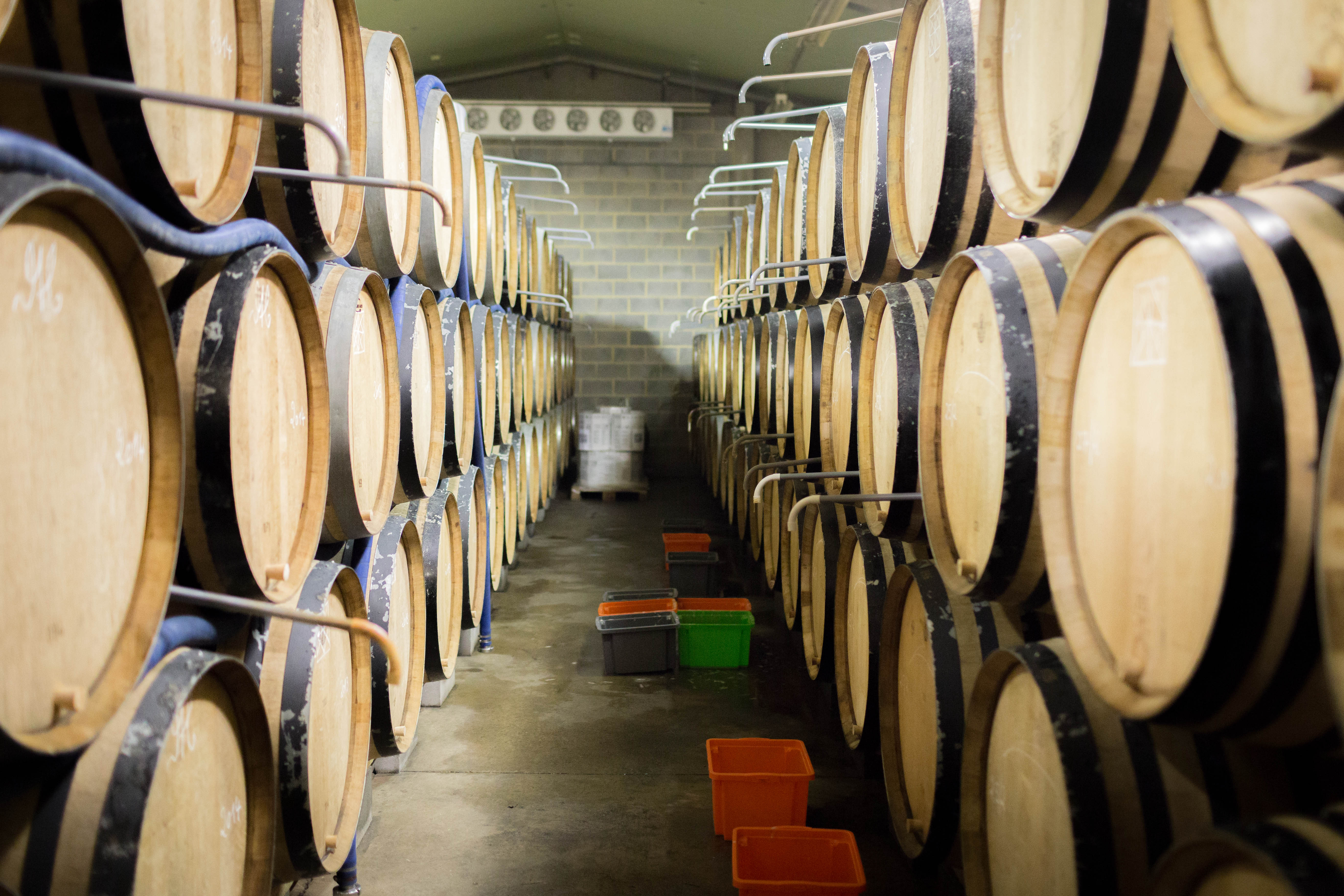
Gueuzerie Tilquin
Bierghes

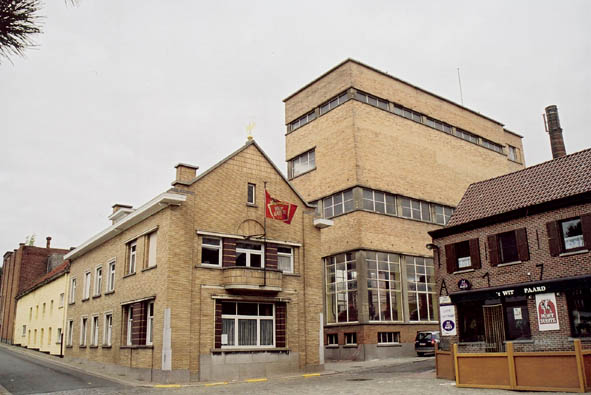
Brouwerij Mort Subite
Asse
