= Tilquin =

Belgian lambic beer blendery

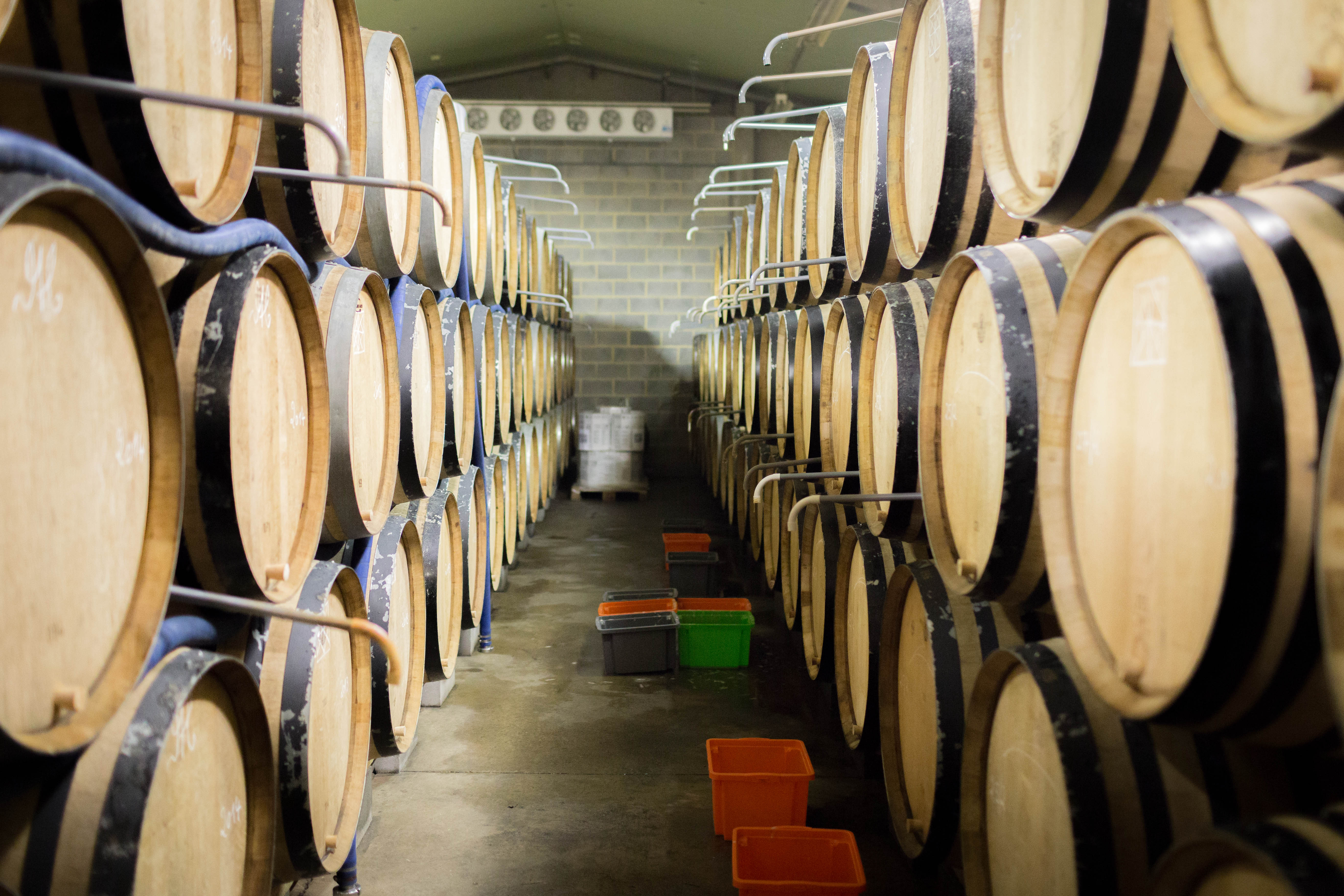
- Industry: Alcoholic beverage
- Founded: 2009
- Founder: Pierre Tilquin
- Headquarters: Bierghes, Belgium
- Products: Beer
- Website: www.gueuzerietilquin.be

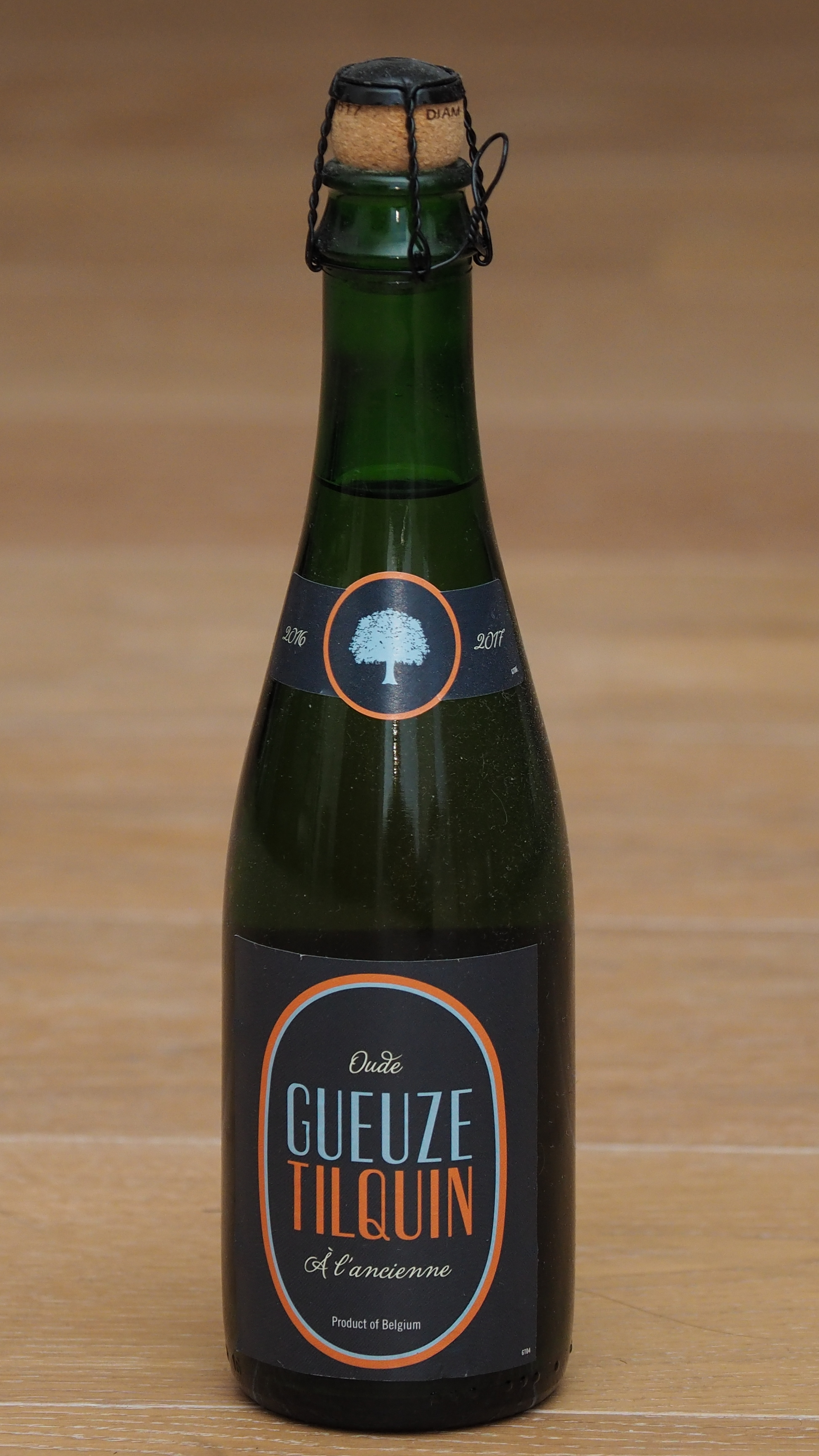
Tilquin Oude Gueuze

Tilquin (or Gueuzerie Tilquin) is a Belgian lambic beer blendery based in Bierghes, founded in 2009 by Pierre Tilquin. Tilquin is the only lambic blendery in the mainly French-speaking, southern region of Wallonia. In addition, Tilquin is the only blendery that is allowed to blend one, two, and three-year-old lambics with wort acquired from Boon, Lindemans, Girardin, and Cantillon breweries.

== History ==
The brewery was founded in 2009 by Pierre Tilquin, a bioengineer and holder of a PhD in statistical genetics. Prior to opening the blendery, he studied brewing science in Leuven, apprenticed at some of the major breweries in Belgium, including Huyghe Brewery, 3 Fonteinen and Cantillon.

Tilquin produces blends of one, two, and three-year-old lambics with wort acquired from Boon, Lindemans, Girardin, and Cantillon for the Oude Gueuze Tilquin à L'Ancienne. While the first 2010–2011 labeled release of Oude Gueuze was reportedly a blend of just one and two-year-old lambics, all subsequent batches have been blends of one, two, and three-year-old lambics. The first known bottling of the gueuze occurred in December 2010 and was labelled as "1ier soutirage" ("1st racking"). Tilquin has consistently produced lambic blends in 750ml and 375ml bottles for export every year since its opening.

In February 2012, Tilquin introduced its first fruited lambic with the release of a very limited batch of Oude Quetsche Tilquin à L'Ancienne, sold in 750ml bottles. The initial batch was limited to purchases at the brewery, but a second batch produced in January 2013 saw widespread release in Europe and North America later the same year. It was debuted to coincide with the 2013 Toer de Geuze.

In 2012, Gueuzerie Tilquin joined HORAL, the High Council for Artisanal Lambic Beers. Tilquin is the first HORAL member outside of Flanders and lies just 200 metres (660 ft) past the language border in the French-speaking municipality of Rebecq.

In March 2015, the Belgian daily newspaper La Capitale reported that 75% of Gueuzerie Tilquin's production was reserved for export, with 40% of that being sent solely to the United States. Tilquin also participated in the 10th anniversary Toer de Geuze in 2015. The weekend also saw the release of Tilquin's second fruited lambic, Oude Mûre Tilquin à l'Ancienne, a lambic fruited with blackberries. In addition to the Toer de Geuze, Tilquin also hosted an English beer festival.

In 2017, Tilquin began to expand their capacity with several more stainless steel tanks. These tanks will be used to continue larger scale production of fruited lambics following the first experimental fruit series.

== Beers ==
There are three core blends, with several other limited release gueuze blends, and fruited or wine grape Lambics. Distribution began in the United States in 2017.

- Oude Gueuze Tilquin — (7% alc / vol) A spontaneously fermented beer obtained from the blending of 1, 2 and 3 years old lambics.
- Oude Quetsche Tilquin — (6.4% alc/vol) A spontaneously fermented beer obtained from the fermentation of fresh plums.
- Gueuze Tilquin Van't Vat (draft version) — (5.3% alc/vol) A spontaneously fermented beer obtained from the blending of a low alcohol lambic and sold only in kegs.
- Abricot a L'Ancienne -- (6.3% alc/vol) Apricot Lambic.
- Airelle Sauvage -- (6.5% alc/vol) Lingonberry Lambic.
- Oude Mure -- (6% alc/vol) Blackberry Lambic.
- Peche Jaune -- (7% alc/vol) Peach Lambic.
- Reinette Etoile -- (6.8% alc/vol) Apple Lambic.
- Oude Rhubarbe -- (6.3% alc/vol) Rhubarb Lambic.
- Sureau Rullquin -- (7.3% alc/vol) Elderberry Lambic and Oude Bruin blend.
- Tilquin Gewurtztraminer -- (8.2% alc/vol) Gewurtztraminer wine grape Lambic.
- Tilquin Mourvedre -- (7.7 % alc/vol) Mourvedre wine grape Lambic.
- Tilquin Pinot Gris -- (8.4% alc/vol) Pinot Gris wine grape Lambic.
