= Oud Beersel =

Lambic brewery and geuze blendery in Beersel, Belgium

Coordinates: 50°45′31″N 4°18′03″E

- Oud Beersel logo
- Interactive map of Oud Beersel
- Location: Beersel, Belgium
- Opened: 1882
- Annual production volume: 1,200 hl (2025)
- Owner: Gert Christiaens

Active beers
| Name | Type |
| Oude Geuze Oud Beersel | geuze |
| Oude Kriek Oud Beersel | kriek |
| Oude Lambiek Oud Beersel | lambic |
| Bersalis Tripel | tripel |

Oud Beersel is a Belgian lambic producer and geuze blendery in Beersel, about ten kilometres south-west of Brussels. It was founded in 1882 by Henri Vandervelden, ceased production at the end of 2002 and was restarted in 2005 by Gert Christiaens. The company is a member of HORAL, the umbrella organisation of traditional lambic producers, whose main event is the biennial Toer de Geuze.

Lambic wort is brewed to Oud Beersel's own recipe at a partner brewery; spontaneous fermentation, maturation in wooden casks, blending, fruit maceration and bottle maturation take place in Beersel. Oude Geuze and Oude Kriek are protected by the European Union as a Traditional Speciality Guaranteed.

== History ==
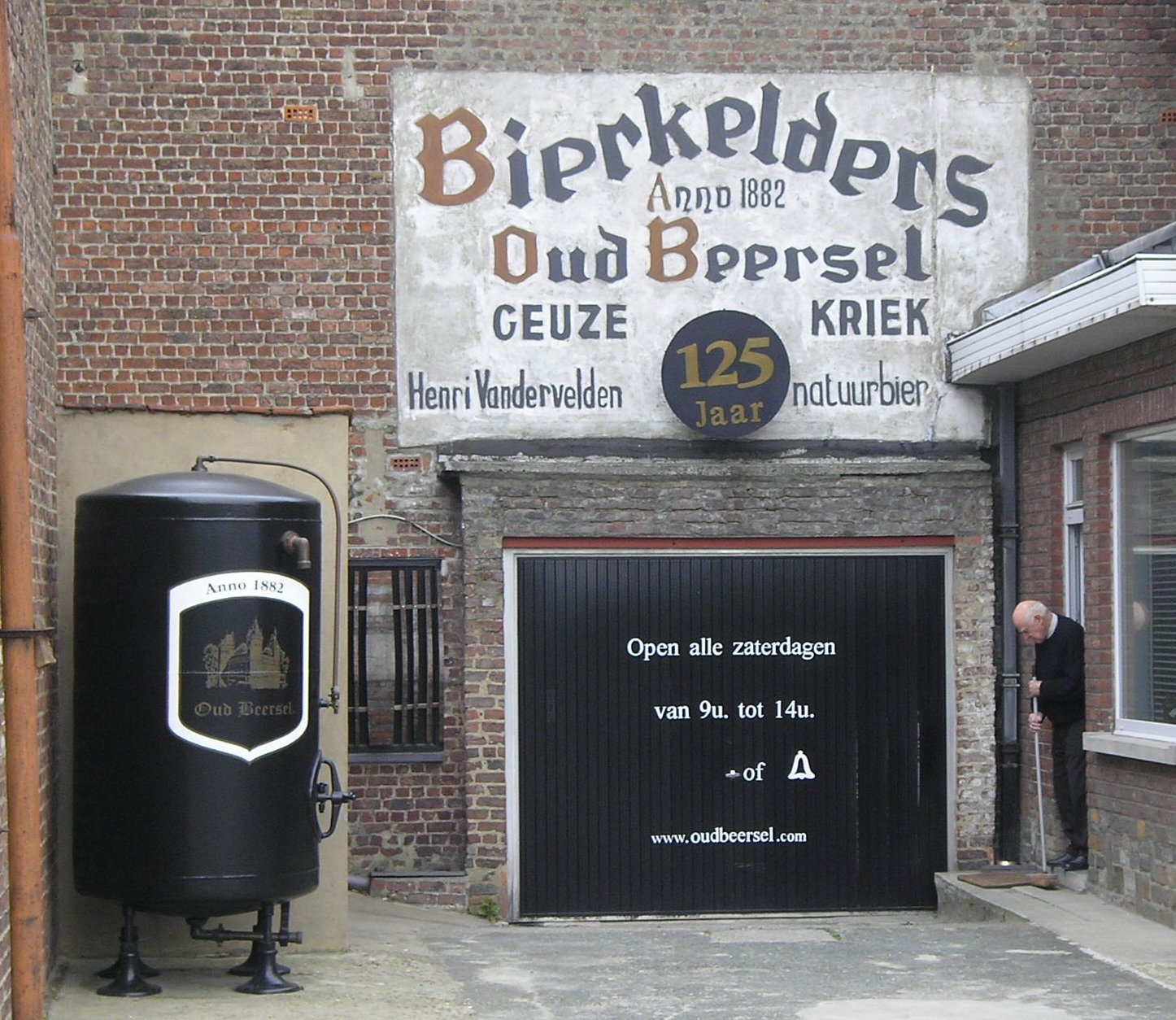
Entrance of the Oud Beersel brewery (2008)

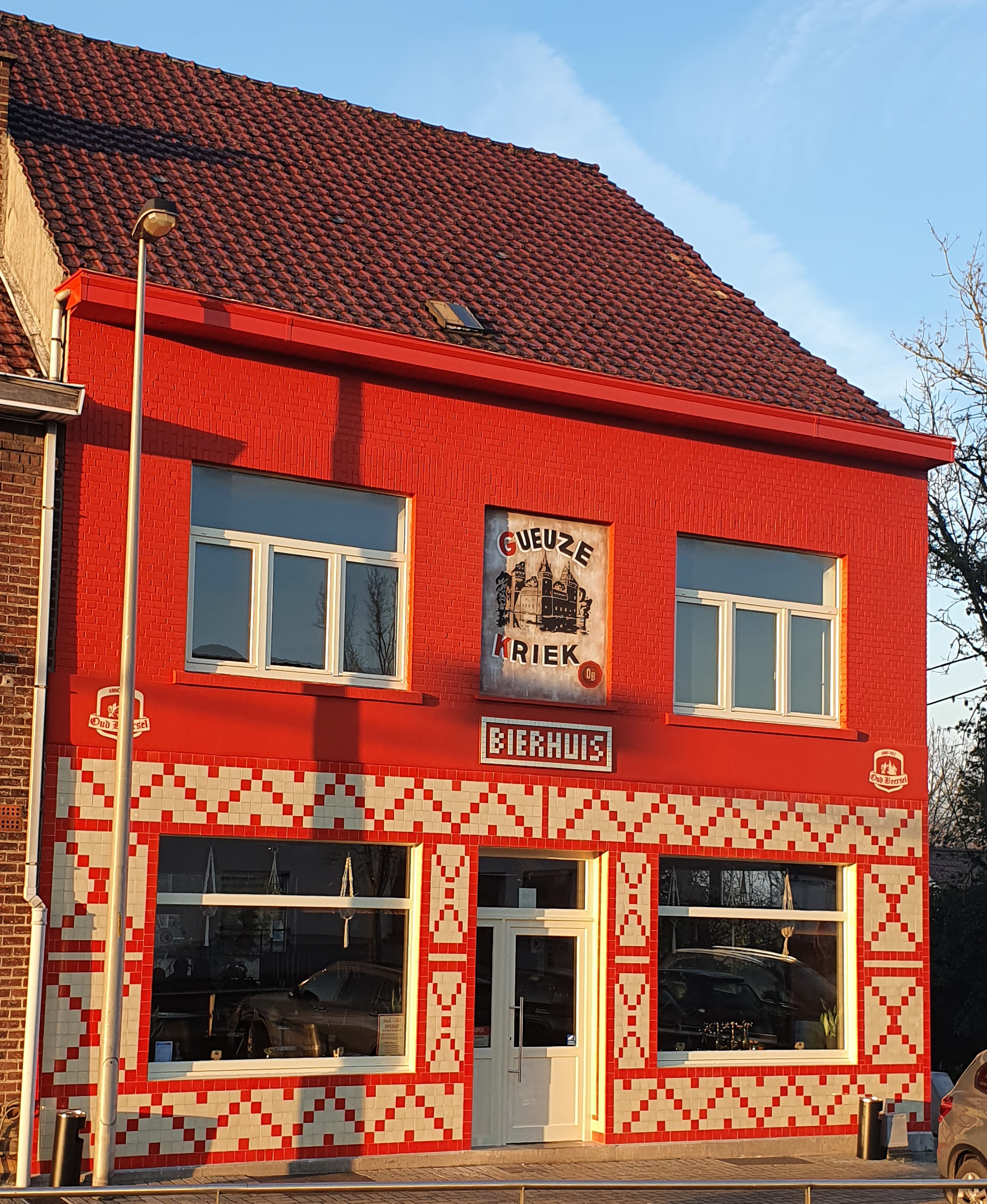
The brewery pub "Het Bierhuis" (2022)

=== The Vandervelden family ===
Henri Vandervelden, a seasonal worker at the De Kroon brewery in Uccle, founded a blendery in the Kasteelstraat in Beersel in 1882, producing lambic, geuze, faro and mars. One of his sons, Pierre, continued that business until 1947.

Egidius, the eldest son, converted his parents-in-law's farm on the Laarheide in 1922 and set up his own blendery there. Shortly before the Second World War he began brewing lambic himself, in a small plant assembled from second-hand parts. When wheat, an essential raw material for lambic, was banned during the occupation, he used ground and kilned sugar beet as a substitute. In 1934 the farm and cart house were rebuilt as the pub "Het Bierhuis", fitted with a Mortier dance organ; one of his daughters, Marie-Thérèse, ran it until 1988.

Egidius's son Henri qualified as a brewing engineer at the Institut National des Industries de Fermentation and took over in 1953, on his father's death. He increased brewing capacity to 50 hl per brew and, out of attachment to tradition, gave the business the name Oud Beersel. In 1991 he was succeeded by his nephew Danny Draps, a son of Marie-Thérèse. The brewing and bottling equipment had aged and little had been invested for years; at the end of 2002 Draps stopped production and sold the pub, which became a florist's shop.

=== Restart ===
When Gert Christiaens and his friend Roland De Bus learned that the brewery had closed, they set out to revive it. They founded a company to take over Oud Beersel and from 2003 followed a course in malting and brewing in Ghent, while Christiaens brewed alongside Henri Vandervelden, who passed on his family's knowledge of lambic and of geuze blending. To generate income they launched Bersalis Tripel at the end of 2005, brewed to their own recipe at the Huyghe Brewery in Melle; the brewery officially reopened in November of that year.

Oude Geuze and Oude Kriek returned to the market in March 2007, after an absence of almost five years. Roland De Bus left the company in April 2007.

=== Since 2007 ===
In 2013 the Oude Geuze was named best beer at the 21st Australian International Beer Awards. In the following years Oud Beersel won further awards at international beer competitions, among them silver at the 2014 World Beer Cup. The awards are on display in the brewery shop.

In 2016 Oud Beersel acquired the agricultural plot behind the brewery and from 2017 planted some 240 Schaarbeek cherry trees, the variety traditionally used for kriek; a second orchard followed in 2025.

In January 2022 Het Bierhuis, the pub next to the brewery, reopened after a thorough renovation. The façade, floor, bar and wooden wall panels were restored, and stools were made from old aluminium beer casks found in the cellar.

In 2024 Oud Beersel acquired LinkeBeer, a beer rooted in the neighbouring municipality of Linkebeek.

== Production ==
Since 1992 the lambic wort has been brewed to Oud Beersel's recipe and specifications at a partner brewery. After cooling overnight in an open coolship, where it is inoculated by ambient micro-organisms, the wort is taken to Beersel and filled into wooden casks, in which it ferments and matures for up to three years. Blending, fruit maceration, infusion, bottling and bottle maturation take place at Beersel. Parts of the brewery's own historic coolship survive but are no longer in use. The site holds around thirty large foeders, most of them former oak wine vessels, together with some eighty to a hundred smaller casks.

== Beers ==
Alcohol contents as published by the producer.

=== Lambic, geuze and fruit lambic ===
- Oude Geuze Oud Beersel (6.5% ABV)
- Oude Geuze Vandervelden (6.5%)
- Oude Kriek Oud Beersel (6.0%), with about 400 g of morello cherries per litre
- Schaarbeekse Oude Kriek Oud Beersel (7.0%)
- Oude Lambiek Oud Beersel, still lambic
- Kriekenlambiek Oud Beersel (7.5%)
- Framboise Oud Beersel (5.0%)
- Green Walnut (6.5%)
- Rabarberlambiek and a changing range of fruit and infused lambics

=== Top-fermented ===
- Bersalis Tripel (9.5%), brewed at the Huyghe Brewery
- Bersalis Kadet (4.5%)
- Bersalis Tripel Oak Aged (10.5%)
- LinkeBeer (5.8%)

== See also ==
- Geuze
- Lambic
- HORAL
