= Brewery Angerik =

Brewery in Belgium

Brouwerij Angerik
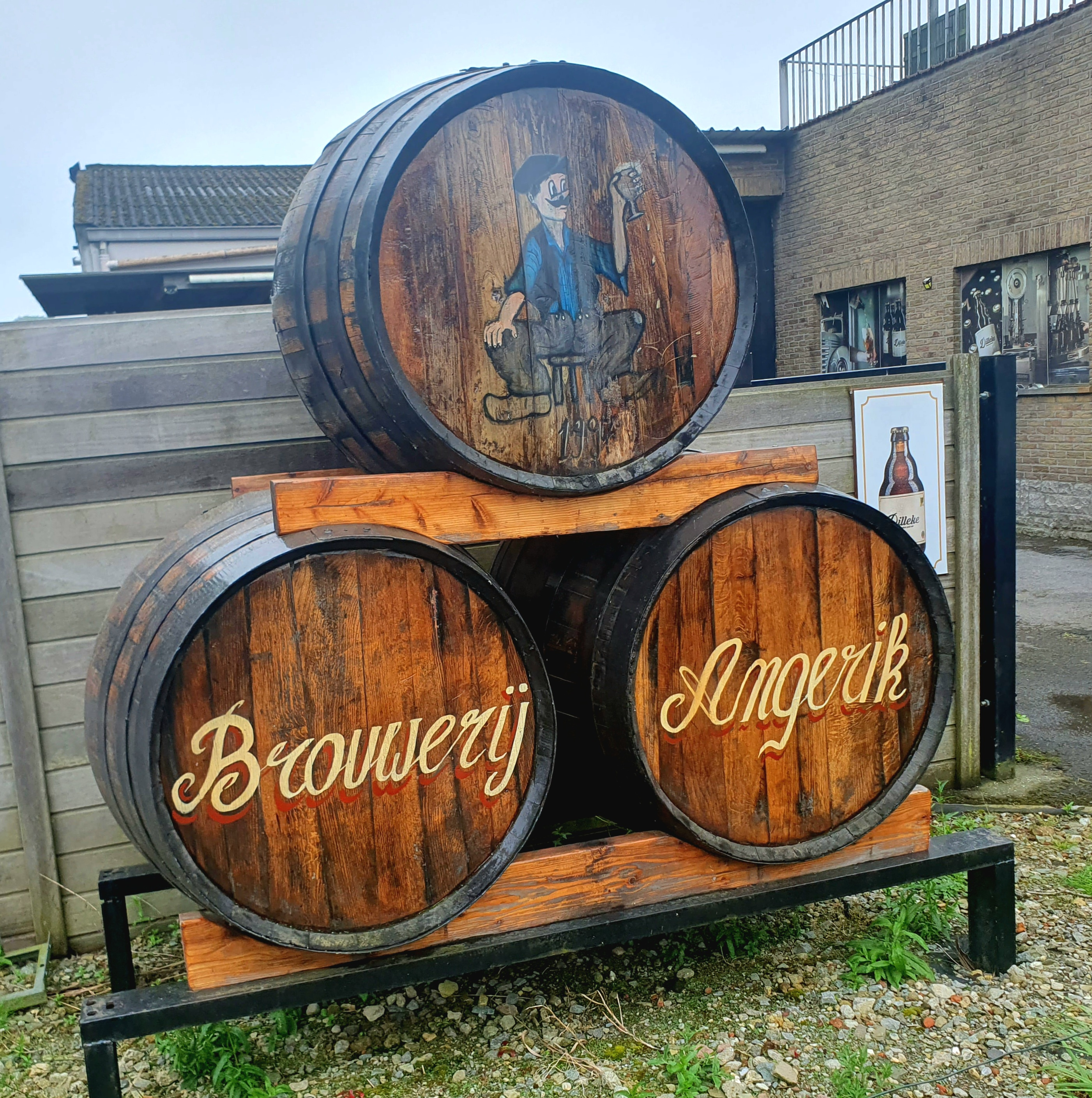
- Type: Brewery
- Location: Snakkaertstraat 30, Dilbeek, Belgium
- Opened: 1997
- Annual production volume: 120hL in 2017
- Owned by: Sam De Cuyper
- Website: www.angerik.be

Active beers
| Name | Type |
| Dilleke | pale ale |
| Cuvée Kluysbosch | lambic |
| Jaak | lager |

Brouwerij Angerik ("Brewery Angerik") is a Belgian microbrewery located in the town of Dilbeek in the province of Flemish Brabant. They brew ales, lambic beers and a lager.

== History ==
Microbrewery Angerik was founded in 1997 in the Belgian town of Zellik by the two brothers-in-law Erik De Cuyper and Angelo Buyse. It was more of a hobby that got out of hand than a full-time business. The name Angerik is a contraction of both their first names: Angelo & Erik. They named their ales 'Boerke', Dutch for peasant. In 2002, the brewery moved to Dilbeek with now only Erik left as brewer. He rebuilt his old auto repair shop into a microbrewery. In 2010, production was reduced to a minimum because it was no longer possible for him to combine the brewery with his main job. Erik only made a few brews a year.

At the end of 2015, Brouwerij Angerik took a fresh start when Erik's son Sam De Cuyper took over the business full-time. 'Boerke' was renamed 'Dilleke', a reference to the town of Dilbeek, where it's brewed. In 2017 at the World Beer Awards, the brewery won a gold medal in the category pale ale with this beer, whose monthly production that time was about 2,000 litres. A pub was also started on the site, which is only open on Saturday afternoons.

In 2021 Sam also began brewing lambic beers in limited volumes under the name 'Cuvée Kluysbosch', referring to the forest nearby the brewery. At the Beer Awards 2023 his Lambic-Cider won a gold medal in the category fruit beer.

A lager called 'Jaak' was added to their assortment of beers in 2024.

== Beers ==
- Dilleke, pale ale
- Indian Summer, India pale ale
- Hello Darkness, oatmeal stout
- Lady in Red, fruitbeer of sour cherries
- Jaak, lager

=== Cuvée Kluysbosch ===
- Lambiek in bag-in-box (3L)
- Lambiek Islay Whisky Barrel Aged
- Saison Apricot Brandy Barrel Aged
- Lambiek - Cider
- Lambiek - Framboos (Eng: raspberry)
- Lambiek - Vijgen (Eng: figs)

== Photo gallery ==
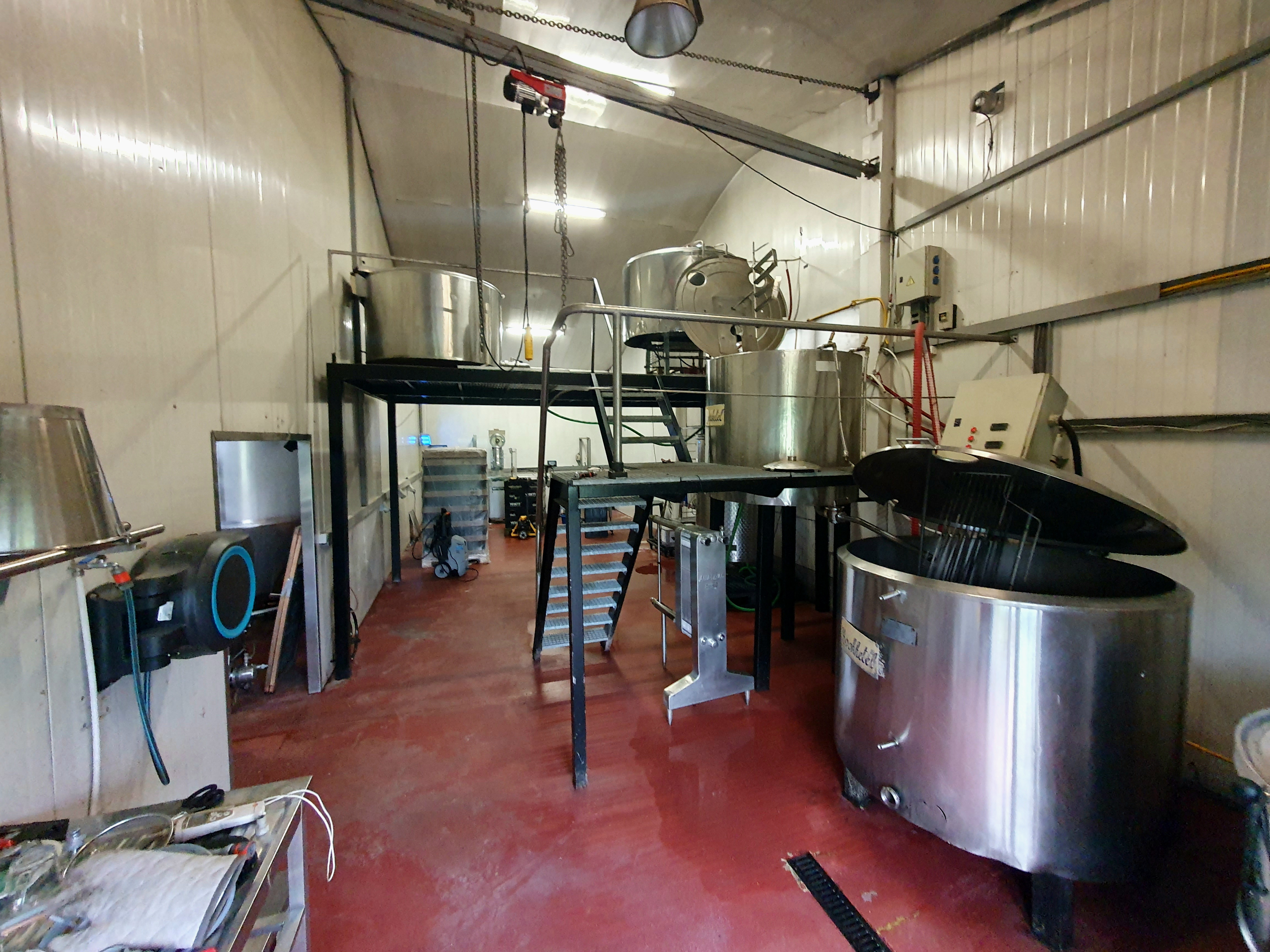
Brewery installation

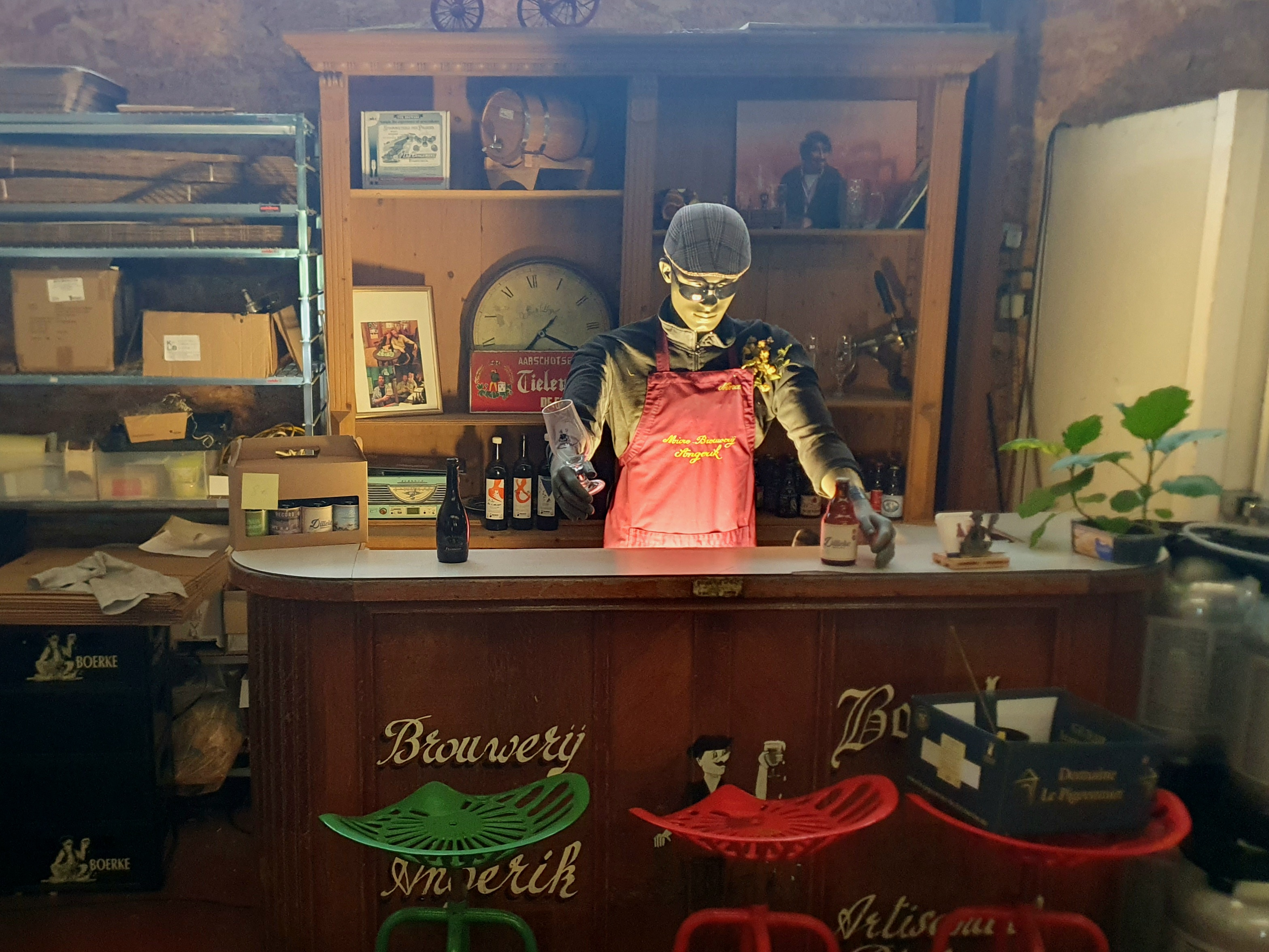

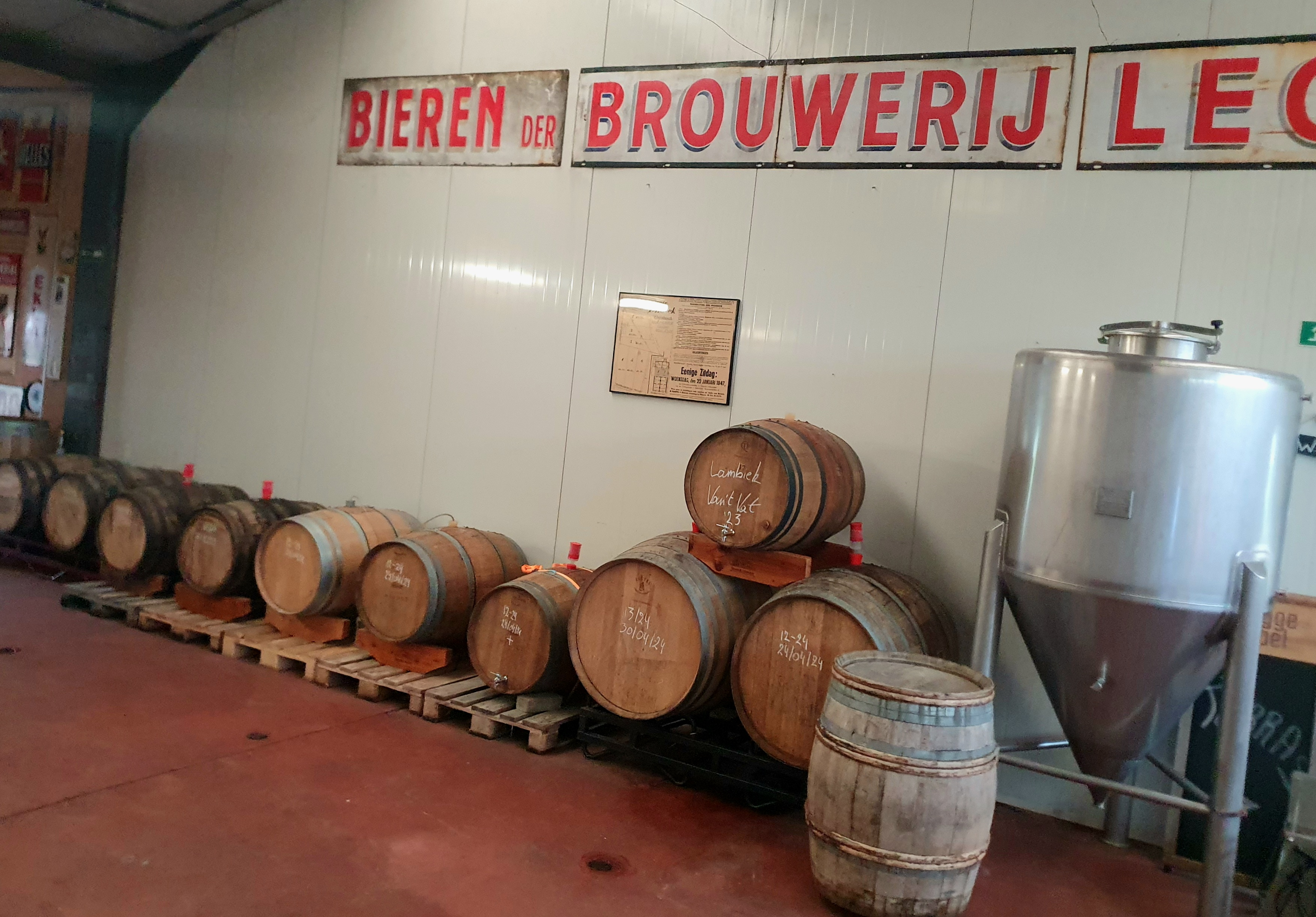
Lambic barrels

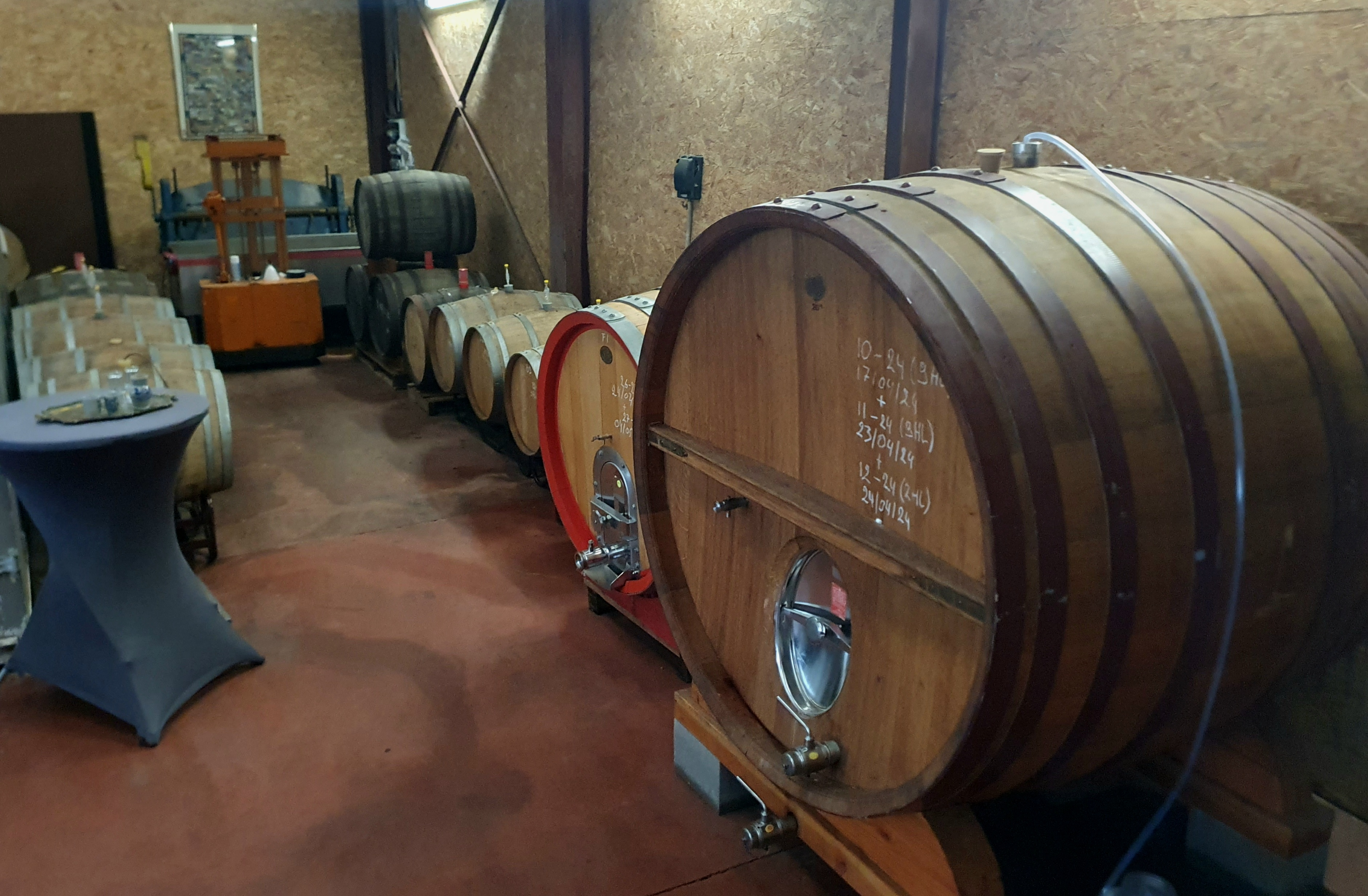
Lambic-foudre

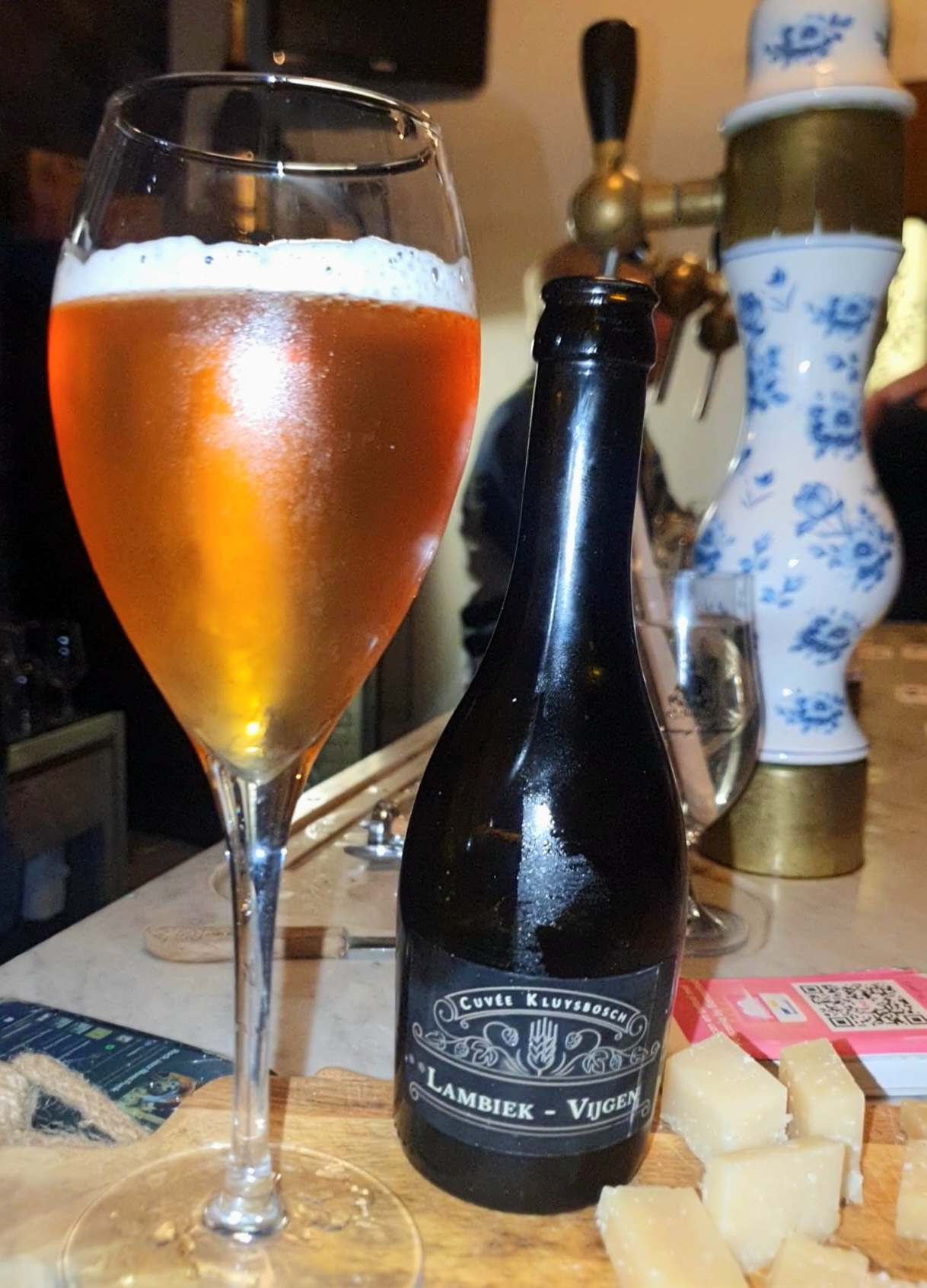
Cuvée Kluysbosch
Lambiek-Vijgen
