= Kriek lambic =

Style of Belgian beer made with sour cherries

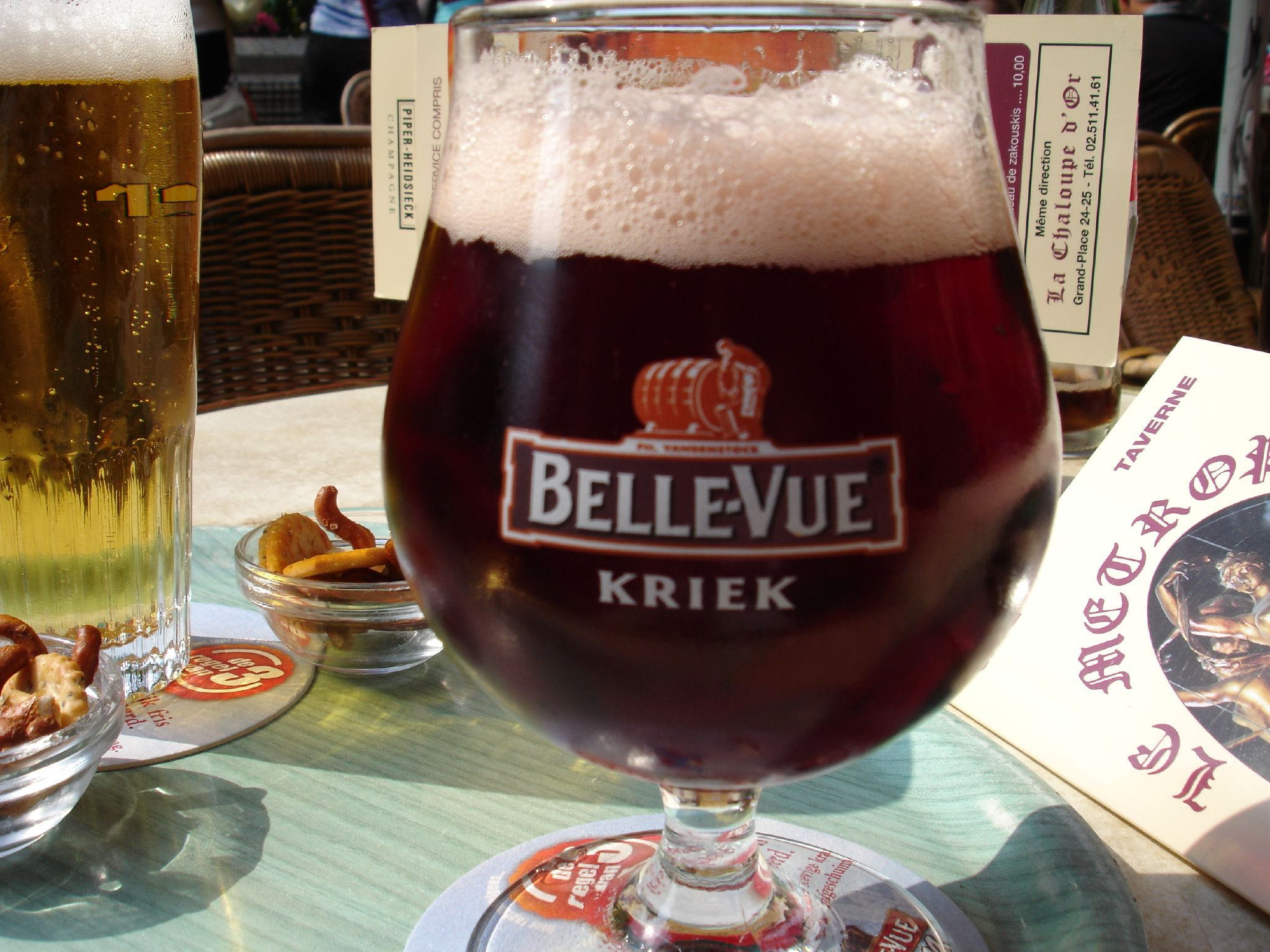
A glass of Belgian kriek beer

Kriek lambic is a style of Belgian beer, made by fermenting lambic with sour Morello cherries. Traditionally "Schaarbeekse krieken" (a rare Belgian Morello variety) from the area around Brussels are used. As the Schaarbeek type cherries have become more difficult to find, some brewers have replaced these (partly or completely) with other varieties of sour cherries, sometimes imported.

== Etymology ==
The name is derived from the Dutch word for this type of cherry (kriek).

== Brewing ==
Traditionally, kriek is made by breweries in and around Brussels using lambic beer to which sour cherries (with the pits) are added. A lambic is a sour and dry Belgian beer, fermented spontaneously with airborne yeast said to be native to Brussels; the presence of cherries (or raspberries) predates the almost universal use of hops as a flavoring in beer. A traditional kriek made from a lambic base beer is sour and dry as well. The cherries are left in for a period of several months, causing a refermentation of the additional sugar. Typically no sugar will be left so there will be a fruit flavour without sweetness. There will be a further maturation process after the cherries are removed.

More recently, some lambic brewers have added sugar to the final product of their fruit beers, in order to make them less intense and more approachable to a wider audience. They also use cherry juice rather than whole cherries and are matured for much shorter periods.

Framboise is a related, less traditional Belgian beer, fermented with raspberries instead of sour cherries. Kriek is also related to gueuze, which is not a fruit beer but is also based on refermented lambic beer. Some breweries, like Liefmans, make "kriek" beers based on oud bruin beer instead of lambic.

== Commercial examples ==
Traditional krieks include:

- Lindemans Kriek Cuvée René
- Boon Oude Kriek
- Cantillon Kriek Lambic
- 3 Fonteinen Kriek
- Girardin Kriek 1882
- Hanssens Kriek Lambic
- Oud Beersel Oude Kriek Vieille
- Timmermans Traditional Kriek Lambic
- Lyons Peak Brewing Company, Handgeplukte Kriek is an American lambic-style beer made with 100% Schaerbeek cherries.

Sweetened krieks include:

- Belle-Vue Kriek Lambic
- De Troch Chapeau Kriek Lambic
- Lindemans Kriek Lambic
- Boon Kriek Lambic
- Mort Subite Kriek Lambic
- Timmermans Kriek Lambic
- Van Honsebrouck St. Louis Kriek Lambic
- La Sultane Halal Kriek

Kriek based on Oud Bruin include:

- De Ryck Kriek Fantastiek
- Liefmans Kriek
- Kasteel Kriek
- Verhaeghe Echt Kriekenbier
