= Coigneau =

Belgian variety of hops

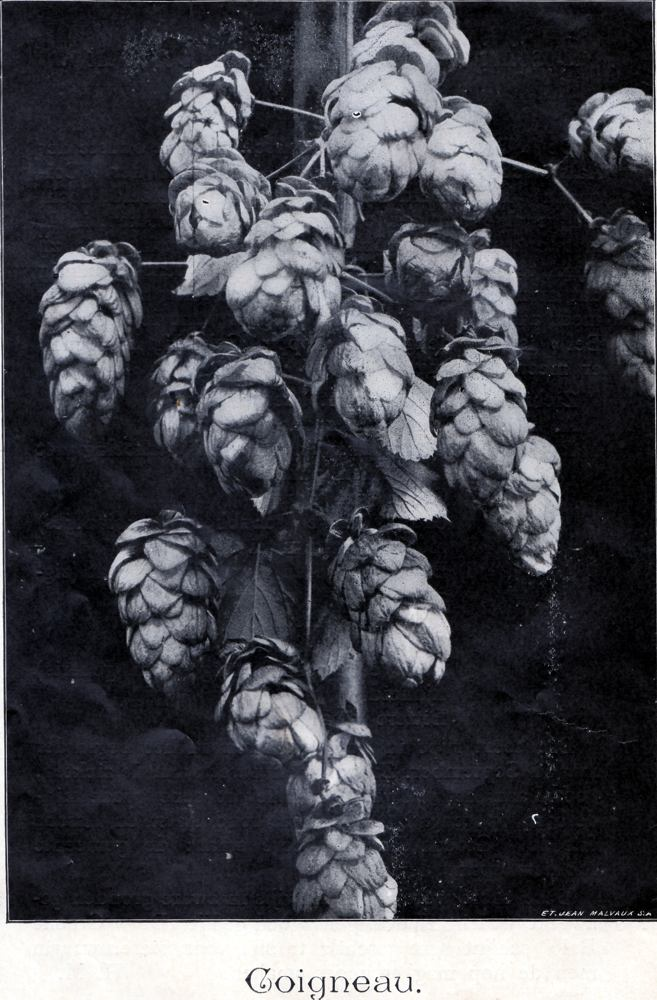
Coigneau hops pictured in 1909

Coigneau (French pronunciation: [kwaɲo]) is a Belgian variety of hop which was massively cultivated in the Flemish Aalst-Asse area near Brussels in the nineteenth and first half of the twentieth century. Because of the light bitterness the Coigneau was during a considerable period of time the favorite hop used for Lambic beer brewed in the Pajottenland region of Belgium (southwest of Brussels). Traditional lambic brewing required aged hops but utilized fresh hops as well, preferably in a 50%/50% proportion. The addition of fresh hops was possible because the local hop variety Coigneau contained low alpha-acids and thus added little to the bitterness of the resulting brew.

== History ==
Historically, the name Coigneau is derived from the farmer Franciscus Coigneau who is recognized as first cultivating this hop in the late eighteenth century on his fields in the village of Teralfene in the Aalst-Asse area.
