= Girardin Brewery =

Belgian brewery specializing in lambics since 1845

- Location: St. Ulrik's Kapelle, Belgium
- Opened: 1845

Active beers
Name	Type
Gueuze (black label)	gueuze
Gueuze (white label)	gueuze
Kriek	kriek
Framboise	framboise
Faro	faro
Pils	pilsner

Girardin is a family-owned brewery in Sint-Ulriks-Kapelle, Belgium. The brewery was founded in 1845 and has been owned and operated by the Girardin family since 1882. The brewery specializes in lambic beers.
