= Belle-Vue Brewery =

Belgian brewery

- Type: Brewery
- Founded: 1913
- Headquarters: Molenbeek, Brussels, Belgium
- Products: Beer
- Owner: AB InBev
- Website: bottelarijbellevue.com

Belle-Vue Brewery is a brewery founded in 1913 in Molenbeek, Brussels by Philémon Vandenstock from nearby Itterbeek, which lies in a region known for its lambic type of beer. A variety of Belle-Vue lambic and fruit beers are produced in Sint-Pieters-Leeuw.

== Products ==
Four varieties of spontaneous fermentation beers containing 5.5% abv are produced: Belle-Vue Gueuze, Kriek, Kriek Extra and Raspberry. It is the best-known brand of Belgian fruit beer though its sweet taste is far from representing that of traditional sour lambics. Belle-Vue's sole traditional product, Selection Lambic, is produced in very limited quantity (it has not been produced since 1999).

In 2025, owner AB InBev decided to cease production of the Belle-Veu Geuze. However, the brewing of the Belle-Veu kriek was continued.

== Sponsorship ==
Philémon's son, Constant vanden Stock, a former professional footballer and manager of the Belgian national team, became general manager of football club Anderlecht in 1969, after which Belle-Vue became the very first shirt sponsor. Belle-Vue would remain the club's main sponsor for 10 years, during which time the club won several Belgian championships and European cups.
