= Framboise =

Belgian lambic beer

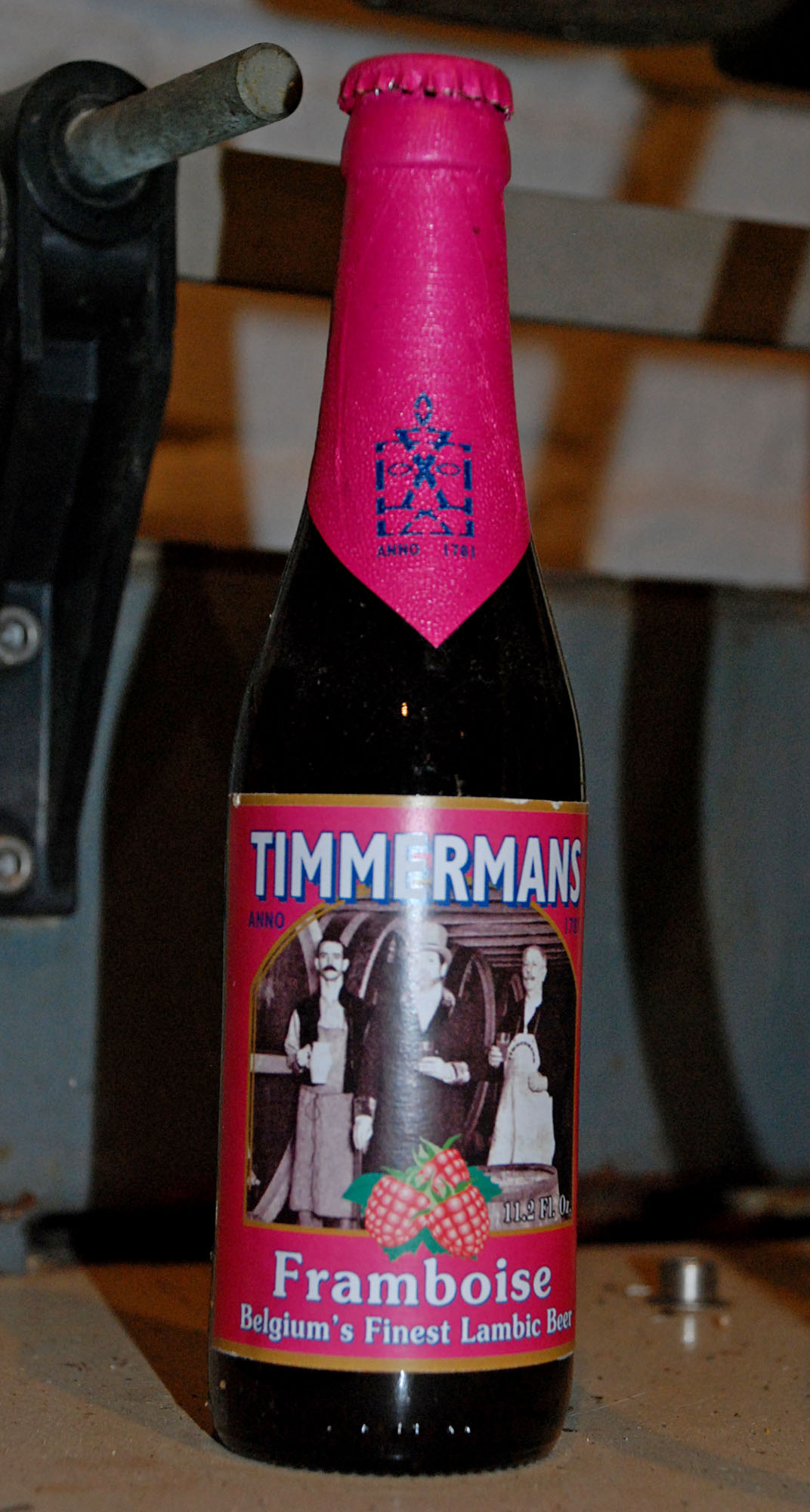
Belgian framboise

Framboise is a Belgian lambic beer fermented with raspberry. (Framboise is the French word for raspberry, pronounced [fʁɑ̃bwaz].)

== Beer ==
In English, framboise is used primarily in reference to a Belgian lambic beer that is fermented using raspberries. It is one of many modern types of fruit beer that have been inspired by the more traditional kriek beer, which is made using sour cherries.

Framboise is usually served in a small footed glass that resembles a champagne flute, only shorter. Most framboise beers are quite sweet, though the Cantillon Brewery produces a tart version called Rosé de Gambrinus that is based on the traditional kriek style. The Liefmans brewery uses oud bruin beer instead of lambic to make its framboise beer, resulting in a very different taste. There are other beers outside of Belgium, however, that can be considered "framboise." For example, the New Glarus Brewing Company in Wisconsin produces a beer called "Raspberry Tart" which they describe as a "Wisconsin Framboise Ale."

== See also ==
- Kriek lambic, which uses sour cherries instead of raspberries
