= Bierk =

Bierk is a surname. Notable people with the surname include:

- David Bierk (1944–2002), American-born Canadian painter
- Sebastian Bach (born Sebastian Philip Bierk in 1968), Canadian singer-songwriter
- Zac Bierk (born 1976), Canadian ice hockey player

== See also ==
- Birk (name)
