= Coolship =

Type of brewing vessel

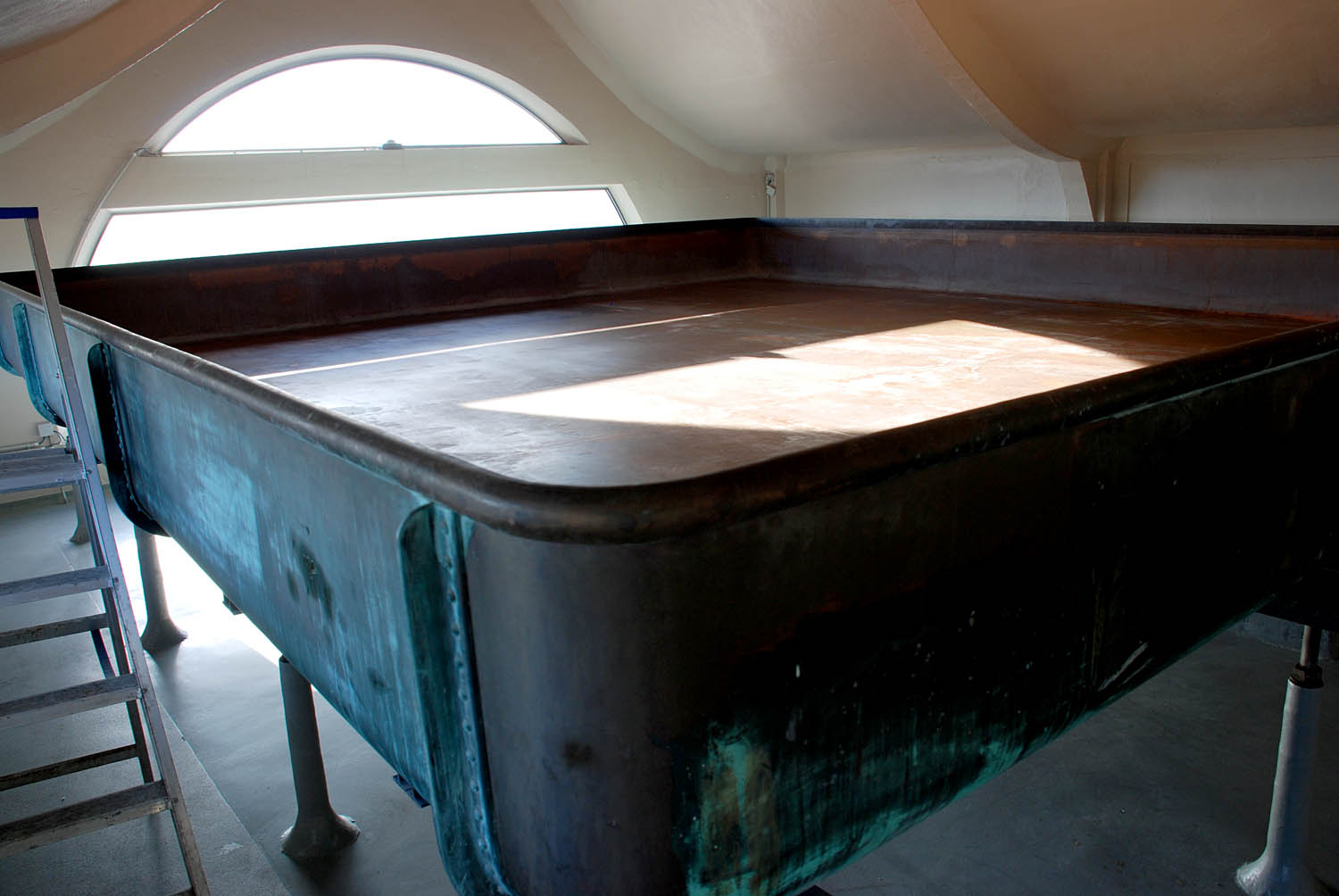
A coolship at Brouwerij Omer Vander Ghinste

A coolship (Anglicized version of the Dutch/Flemish koelschip) is a type of brewing vessel traditionally used in the production of beer. It is a broad, open-top, flat vessel in which wort cools. The high surface to volume ratio allows for more efficient cooling. Contemporary usage includes any open fermenter used in the production of beer, even when using modern mechanical cooling techniques. Traditionally, coolships were constructed of wood, but later were lined with iron or copper for better thermal conductivity.

The word "coolship" was trademarked by Allagash Brewing Company in the United States. The company later decided to terminate the trademark, in the interests of maintaining good relations with others in the craft beer industry.

== Modern use ==
Coolships are still used in traditional lambic brewing, where the wort is cooled and airborne yeasts and bacteria present in the brewery are allowed to inoculate the beer naturally, in order to create a spontaneous fermentation.
