= Dworp =

- Seal
- Interactive map of Dworp
- Coordinates: 50°44′N 4°18′E
- Country: Belgium
- Region: Flanders
- Province: Flemish Brabant
- Municipality: Beersel

Area
  - Total: 9.61 km^{2} (3.71 sq mi)

Population (2002)
  - Total: 5,277

Dworp (Dutch pronunciation: [dʋɔrp]; French: Tourneppe [tuʁnɛp]) is a small town in the municipality of Beersel, south of Brussels in Flanders. Dworp has an area of 9.61 square kilometers. As of January 1, 2002, it has a population of 5,277 inhabitants.

== Things to see ==
- Town Hall with a pillory beside it
- Castle (GravenHof)
- Centre for cultural education Destelheide (hosts yearly the 'zomeracademie' together with the Antwerp-based cultural organisation De Veerman.)
- Camp site for groups ()
