= Boon Brewery =

Belgian brewery

Coordinates: 50.7118°N 4.2194°E

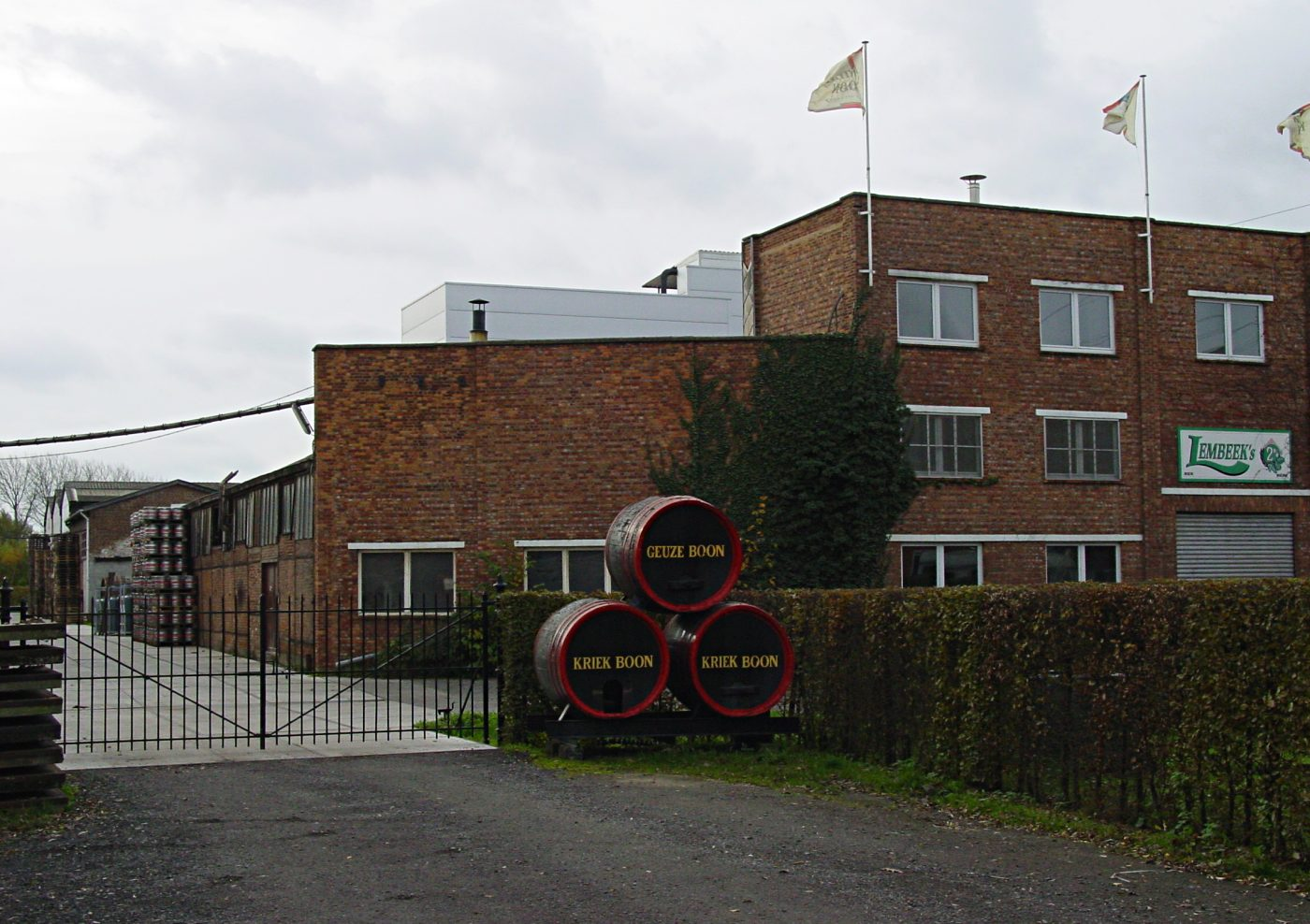
- The Boon Brewery in Lembeek
- Type: Brewery
- Location: Brussels, Belgium Lembeek
- Opened: 1978
- Key people: Frank Boon

Active beers
Geuze and kriek
| Name | Type |

Other beers
Faro beer and Duivelsbier
| Name | Type |

Boon Brewery (Brouwerij Boon) is a Belgian brewery in Lembeek, near Brussels, that mainly produces geuze and kriek beer of a fairly traditional lambic variety, but using modern brewing techniques and equipment. Other products of the brewery including Faro beer and Duivelsbier, the traditional beer of Halle.

The brewery was founded in 1978. Frank Boon purchased the De Vits brewery, café and geuzestekerij when Rene De Vits and his sister Jeanne decided to retire. The brewery moved from Hondzocht to Lembecq itself and the first beer was produced there in the fall of 1990 in partnership with Palm Belgian Craft Brewers, which took a 50% stake. The production increases steadily: 450 hl in 1990, 5 000 hl in 2000, 11 300 hl in 2009, 14 000 hl in 2011. The head of the brewery is Frank Boon and the Boon family own 50%. The other 50% was sold to Palm Breweries, but in 2014 this stake was transferred to Palm's parent company Diepensteyn NV and Boon was not involved in Palm's sale to Bavaria in 2016. The distribution deal between Palm and Boon came to an end in 2016.

== See also ==
- 3 Fonteinen
