= Zellik =

Town in Belgium

Coordinates: 50.8839051°N 4.2627233°E

Zellik is an urbanised town with over 8,000 inhabitants in the municipality of Asse, in the province of Flemish Brabant, Belgium. As a suburb on the northwest edge of Brussels, it is separated from the rest of the agglomeration by the R0 ring road around the city. It is close to the municipalities of Jette, Ganshoren and Sint-Agatha-Berchem, which lie to the east.

The official language is Dutch (as everywhere in Flanders). Zellik is home to a minority of French-speakers.
