= Beer in Belgium =

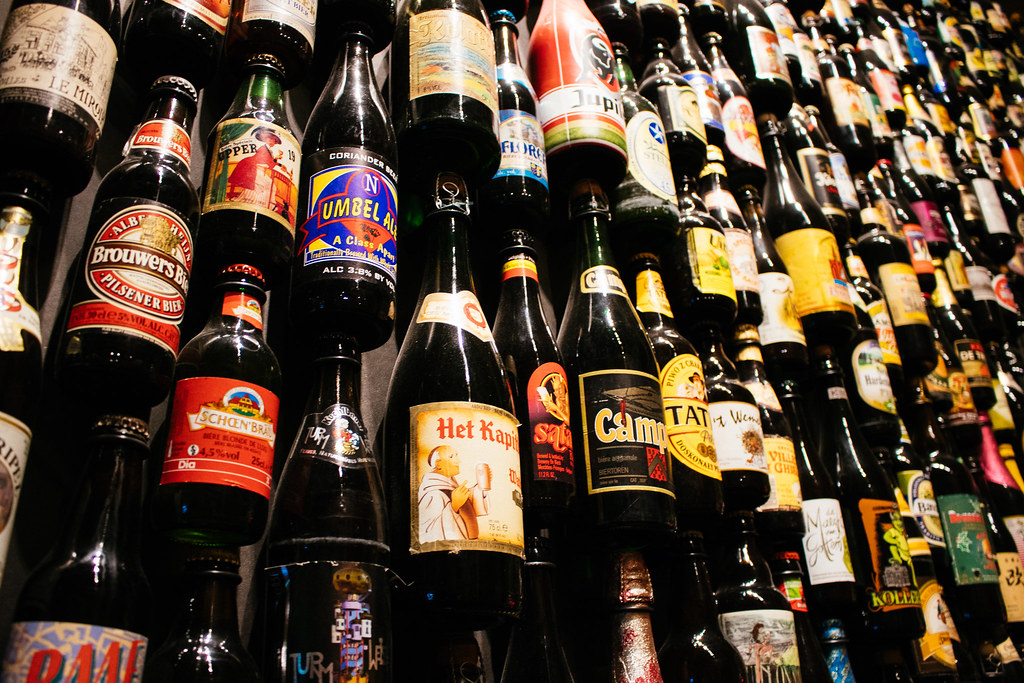
A wall of Belgian beer bottles at the Bruges beer experience

Beer in Belgium includes pale ales, lambics, pilsners, Flemish red ales, sour brown ales, strong ales and wheat beers. In 2024, there were 411 breweries in Belgium, ranging from international companies, such as AB InBev to traditional breweries, like Trappist monasteries, to microbreweries. Correspondingly, the number of Belgian breweries continues to grow, with over 1,600 unique Belgian beers available. On average, Belgians drink 68 litres of beer each year, down from around 200 each year in 1900. In 2024, this amounts to a total consumption of approximately 6.4 million hectoliters, representing around 30% of Belgium’s total beer production.

In 2016, UNESCO inscribed Belgian beer culture on their list of the intangible cultural heritage of humanity.

== Background ==
The range of traditional Belgian beer available is due to a variety of brewing processes, methods of fermentation, the use of yeasts and other ingredients, and traditional knowledge passed through families and breweries for centuries. This results in beers of different colours and textures. While Belgium beer production is less than one per cent of world beer production, and there are fewer breweries in Belgium than in some states of the US, Belgium has more diversity in beer styles than any beer-producing region.

Many local Belgian beers are brewed in micro-breweries. These operations range from small-scale micro-breweries run by individuals or small amateur clubs that produce less than 10 hectolitres per year to larger commercial operations that produce thousands of hectolitres of beer annually. There are also beer firms that commercialise beer (sometimes with their own recipes) under their own brand, and local brewers who brew for them as Etiket or 'contractors'. There are some large breweries and two global players with Inbev (formerly Interbrew/Stella Artois) and Alken-Maes (Heineken Group). A large quantity of beer is produced in Belgium for export. In 2016, a total of 20,600,000 hL (2.06 million L) was produced which is higher than the 19,811,000 hL produced in 2015. In 2016, a total of 14,100,000 hL (1.41 million L) was exported globally, an increase from the 13,025,000 hL exported in 2015. In contrast to the growth of beer production and export, beer consumption in Belgium has declined. In 2016 beer consumption dropped 3.3% from 7,950,000 hL to 7,700,000 hL. Belgium ranks 15th in consumption of beer per capita in Europe.

Belgians consume a large quantity of beer in a wide variety of brands. There are over 800 varieties of beer brewed in Belgium, and all are in high demand. In 2016, a total of 7,689,148 hL (768.91 million L) of beer was consumed, which is 70-75L of beer per capita.

Beer consumption in Belgium is a social event, both in private and in public. People offer beer to guests in their homes or enjoy beer with friends at a pub or restaurant. Most everyday activities either start or end with a beer. Although the number of pubs in Belgium has been declining over the last few decades, every village has at least one local café. In the early 20th century, Belgium had over 3,000 breweries and more than 200,000 cafés—a café for every five houses. The number of cafés, bistros, taverns, and café-restaurants has since declined; at the end of 2005, Belgium (10 mi inhabitants, 30,000km2) counted 19,300 establishments that were listed as cafés (down from 25,500 in 1998). According to a 2016 sector survey, Belgium has 57,500 hotel, restaurant, and café enterprises, with over 80,000 outlets; about 37,500 of these are categorised as restaurants.

Belgian beer culture is most visible in the diversity of beer offered in every pub. A typical beer menu offers at least half a dozen draught beers and two dozen bottled beers of different types. Some degustation cafés will offer over 100 different beers and more than a dozen draught beers. Degustation cafés also offer tastings for parties of four or more. A party of four can order four beers and get 16 glasses to share, so each member can taste 1/4 of each beer. In addition, Belgium has specific beer supermarkets offering a wide variety of beer from multiple producers. Many restaurants offer beer on their menu cards or operate as cafe and restaurants.

The market share of specialty beers in the Belgian market rose in the period between 1990 and 2013 from 10% to 30%. The number of beer varieties has increased from 750 to over 1,600.

== History ==
In Belgium, beer was already produced in the Roman era, as evidenced by the excavation of a brewery and malthouse from the 3rd and 4th centuries AD at Ronchinne. The history of beer in the nation of the Belgae is well documented fin the period, when brewing was very much a women's craft. Traces of domestic brewing activity have been found in the remains of Roman villas in Ronchinne, Anthée, and Mette. During the Early and High Middle Ages, beer was produced with gruit, a mix of herbs and spices that was first mentioned in 974 when the bishop of Liège was granted the right to sell it at Fosses-la-Ville. Gruut was a fundamental part of the brewing process. This is reflected in family names like Gruuthuse, of the Gruuthusemuseum in Bruges.

In abbeys, the quality of beer was improved by adding hops. Hops were gradually used more often as brewers discovered they prevented the beer from souring. The German abbess Hildegard von Bingen provided a detailed description of the workings of hops in the 12th century. Others took different brewing paths. In the Pajottenland region, beers were brewed using wild yeasts and a spontaneous fermentation process, a process particular to the valley of the Zenne, which resulted in Lambic type beers.

From the 14th century onwards, gruit was replaced by hops, after the example of imported beers from northern Germany and Holland. After that, several Belgian towns developed their own types of beer for export to other regions, most notably the white beer of Leuven and Hoegaarden, the caves of Lier and the uitzet of Ghent. In recent years, the use of gruit has experienced a revival, particularly among homebrewers and eventually by commercial breweries. For instance, Gageleer brews a beer using sweet gale (Myrica gale) based on a medieval recipe.

During the reign of Joseph II, Holy Roman Emperor—and later under Napoleon—most abbeys and nunneries were abolished, and the brewing cauldrons disappeared. Now one can only find authentic brewing monks within the Trappist orders, of which six are found in Belgium. In contrast to abbey beers, Trappist beers are only brewed within the walls of the abbey.

Monasteries played only a small role in beer production and mostly brewed for their own consumption and that of their guests. Monastic brewing would only receive some renown from the late 19th century onwards, when the Trappists of Chimay produced a brown beer that was commercially available.

In 1885, a change in legislation made brewing of German-style bottom-fermenting beers viable in Belgium, and it was only from then that large industrial-scale brewing in Belgium took off. During the 20th century the number of breweries in Belgium declined from 3223 breweries in 1900 to only 106 breweries in 1993. Yet, a number of traditional beer styles, such as white beer, lambic and Flemish old brown were preserved, while new local, top-fermented styles developed, such as spéciale belge, abbey beer and Belgian strong ale. In 1988, the country's two biggest breweries, Artois and Piedboeuf, formally merged to become Interbrew, then the world's 18th biggest brewer, which was to merge with AmBev in 2004 to become today's AB InBev, the biggest beer producing company in the world.

== Culture ==
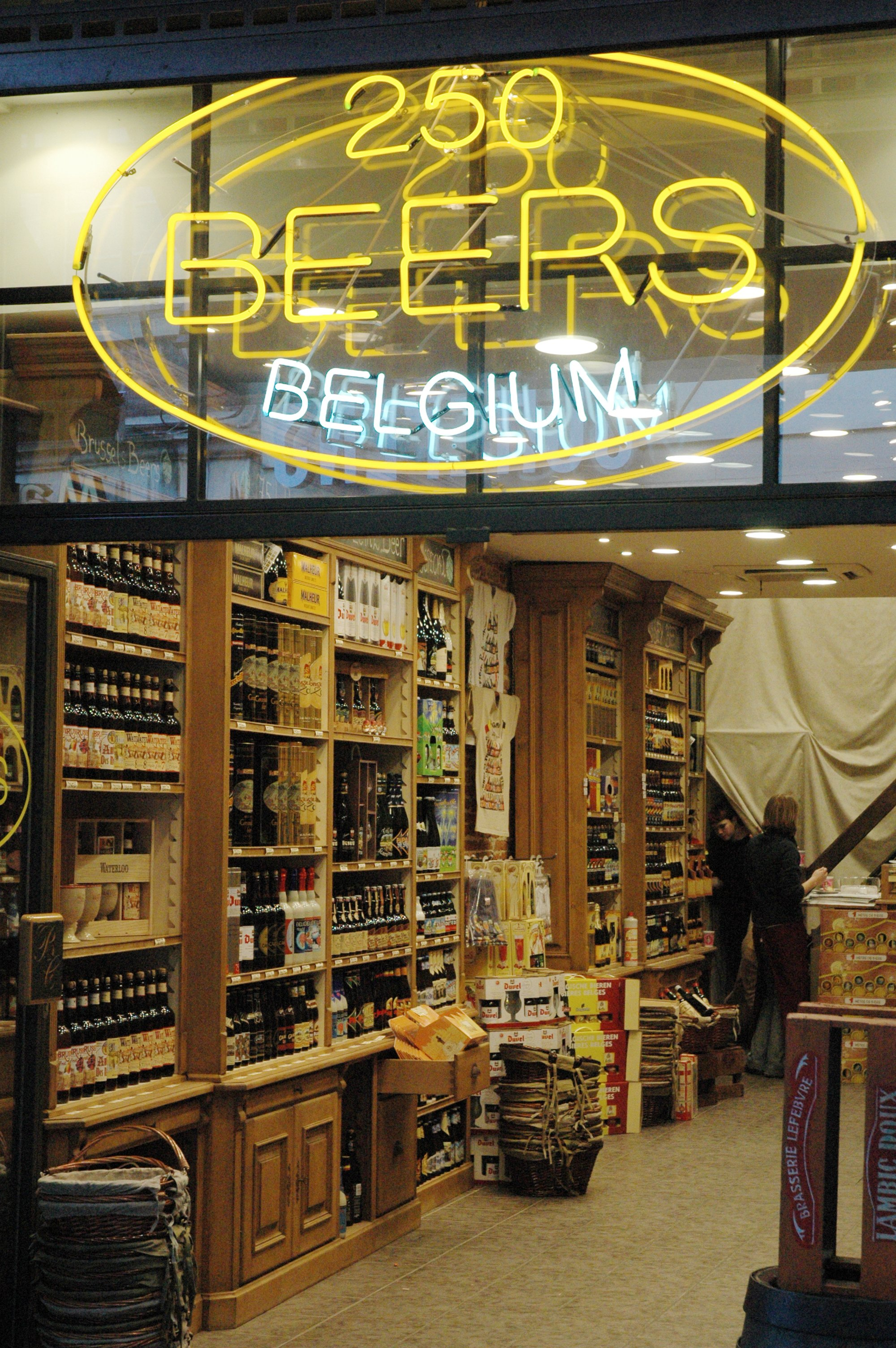
A Belgian shop with 250 different kinds of beer.

Flemish Minister Joke Schauvliege added Belgian beer culture to the Flemish Heritage Inventory. On 30 November 2016, it was announced that Belgian beer culture had been added to the UNESCO Intangible Cultural Heritage Lists.

=== Brewing and tradition ===
Beer is a part of everyday life in Belgium. Until the 1960s, children eating lunch at school could choose from tea, coffee, or beer (the so-called "table beer", blond or sour-brown, which is very low in alcohol). In the 1980s at university restaurants, drink choices were still water and table beer; soft drinks were introduced in the mid-1970s. Most weeks there is a beer festival somewhere in the country, attracting thousands of visitors. Some festivals have an international reputation, whereas others simply celebrate a local village beer.

Besides omnipresent beer, cafés, breweries, and brewing fanatics, there are also several beer museums to be found across the country. Each showcases a different aspect of Belgian beer culture, and each one takes its own unique approach. While some focus on hops and others on transport or history, all of the beer museums in Belgium share one thing in common—they are run by true beer-lovers committed to their passion for Belgian beer. Beer culture is a prominent part of Belgium's history and its folklore. Belgians' love for beer has left a mark in their history books and has created legends that live on today. One legend says that St. Gambrinus, the 'saint of beer', who is said to have introduced hops, is buried in Brussels only meters away from the Brewers House on the Grand Place.

=== St. Gambrinus or Arnold of Soissons ===
The legend of St. Gambrinus seems to go back to John I, Duke of Brabant (c. 1252–1294), John the Fearless, Duke of Burgundy (1371–1419) and was written down from the oral tradition by Bavarian historiographer Johannes Aventinus. John I's dukedom, the Duchy of Brabant, was a wealthy beer-producing area. The brewers' guild in Brussels made the Duke an honorary member and hung his portrait in their meeting hall. In his 1874 monograph on Gambrinus, Victor Coremans reported that references to Brabant and Flanders in the Gambrinus legends seemed recent, but a similarity between the likeness of John I on his tomb and the faces in some illustrations was remarkable. Moreover, the Saint's name seems to have a hypothetical connection: John I was sometimes known as Jan Primus, and Gambrinus might be a corruption of the duke's name.

The real patron saint of hop-pickers and brewers is Arnold Bishop of Soisson (ca 1040–1087), the founder of the Abbey of St. Peter in Oudenburg. In Oudenburg, the friars brewed beer, a vital product in medieval life. Arnold allegedly encouraged the local peasants to drink beer, instead of water, due to its 'gift of health'. During one outbreak of illness, which caused many deaths among the population, Arnold advised the local people to avoid consuming water in favour of beer, which saved many lives.

== Methods ==
In Belgium, four types of fermentation methods are used for the brewing of beer, which is unique in the world. However, for good understanding of labels of Belgian beer and reference works about Belgian beer often use different terms for the fermentation methods based on archaic or traditional jargon:

1. Spontaneous fermentation with beers that are unique in Europe: "lambic" and the derived faro, gueuze and kriek beers
2. Warm fermentation is referred to as top or high fermentation for Trappist beers, white beers, ale, most other special beers
3. Mixed fermentation for "old-brown" type beers
4. Cool fermentation is referred to as low fermentation for lager or pilsner, or bottom fermentation

== Belgian beer types ==
Belgian beers have a range of colours, brewing methods, and alcohol levels.

=== Trappist beers ===
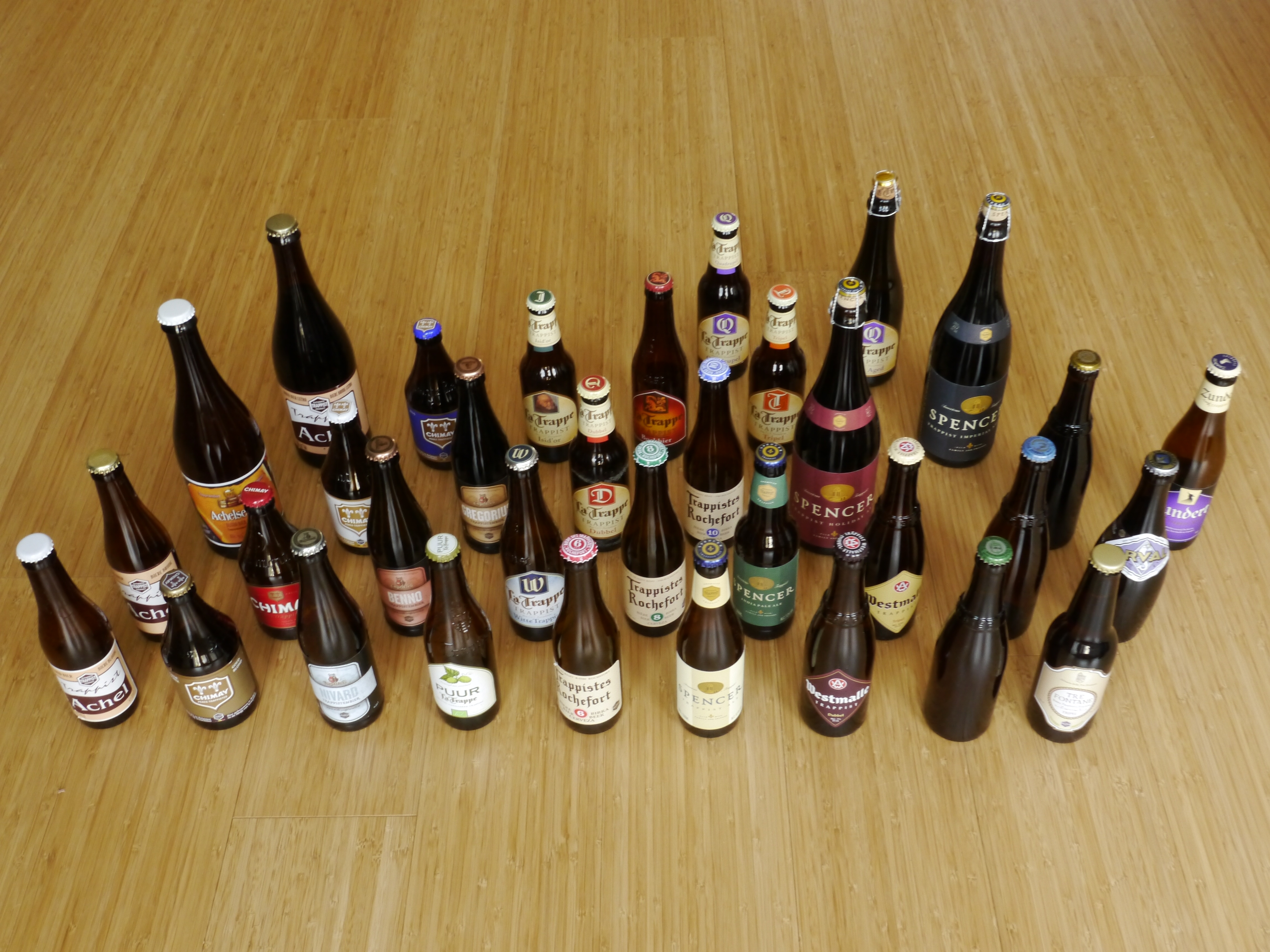
Trappist beer bottles

Beers brewed in Trappist monasteries are termed Trappist beers. For a beer to qualify for Trappist certification, the brewery must be in a monastery, the monks must play a role in its production and the policies and the profits from the sale must be used to support the monastery or social programs outside. Only ten monasteries currently meet these qualifications, five of which are in Belgium, two in the Netherlands, one in Austria, one in Italy and one in the United Kingdom. Trappist beer is a controlled term of origin: it tells where the beers come from, it is not the name of a beer style. Beyond their being mostly warm fermented, Trappist beers have very little in common stylistically.

The current Belgian Trappist producers are:

- Chimay sells Red Label (dark, 7% ABV double), White Label (Blonde, ABV 8%, triple) and Blue Label (dark, 9% ABV, Christmas), Chimay dorée Gold cap (blonde, 4.8% ABV, enkel).
- Orval sells a "unique" dry-hopped 6.2% amber beer.
- Rochefort sells three dark beers, "6" (7.5% ABV). "8" (9.2% ABV) and "10" (11.3% ABV) and one blonde beer "Triple Extra" (8.1% ABV)
- Westmalle sells Dubbel (7% ABV) and Tripel (9.5% ABV),
- Westvleteren sells Green Cap or "Blonde", (5.8% ABV), Blue Cap (dark, 8% ABV) or "8", and Yellow Cap (dark, 10.2% ABV) or "12".

In addition to the above, a lower-strength beer is sometimes brewed for consumption by the brothers (patersbier) or sold on site. For example, l’Orval Vert (or Petit Orval, also known as "Green Orval" or "Small Orval") is served to the monks and guests of the Orval Abbey and can only be consumed on tap in the nearby À l’Ange Gardien abbey café.

=== Abbey beers ===
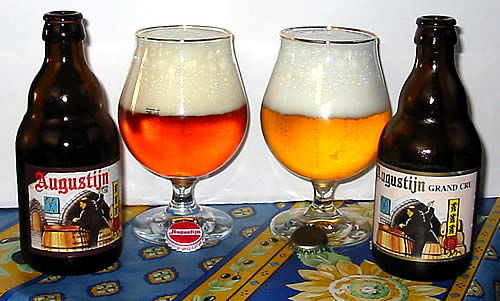
Augustijn and Augustijn Grand Cru, brewed by Brouwerij Van Steenberge

The designation "abbey beers" (Bières d'Abbaye or Abdijbier) originally applied to any monastic or monastic-style beer. After introduction of an official Trappist beer designation by the International Trappist Association in 1997, it came to mean products similar in style or presentation to monastic beers. In other words, an Abbey beer may be:

- produced by a non-Trappist monastery—e.g. Benedictine; or
- produced by a commercial brewery under commercial arrangement with an extant monastery; or
- branded with the name of a defunct abbey by a commercial brewer;

In 1999, the Union of Belgian Brewers introduced a "Certified Belgian Abbey Beer" (Erkend Belgisch Abdijbier) logo to indicate beers brewed under license to an existing or abandoned abbey, as opposed to other abbey-branded beers which the trade markets using other implied religious connections, such as a local saint. The requirements for registration under the logo include the monastery having control over certain aspects of the commercial operation, and a proportion of profits going to the abbey or to its designated charities. Monastic orders other than the Trappists can be and are included in this arrangement. The "Abbey beer" logo and quality label is no longer used for beers given the name of a fictitious abbey, a vaguely monastic branding or a saint name without mentioning a specific monastery. Some brewers may produce abbey-style beers such as dubbel or tripel, using such names but will refrain from using the term Abbey beer in their branding.

What connoisseurs now recognize as Trappist breweries began operations in 1838. Several monasteries, however, maintained "working" breweries for 500+ years before the French regime disrupted religious life (1795–1799). Even then, some Abbey beers such as Affligem Abbey, whose name now appears on beers made by the Heineken-owned Affligem Brewery, resumed brewing from "working" monasteries until the occupation of most of Belgium in World War I. Commercial Abbey beers first appeared during Belgium's World War I recovery.

Although Abbey beers do not conform to rigid brewing styles, most tend to include the most recognizable and distinctive Trappist styles of brune (Belgian brown ale, aka dubbel), strong pale ale or tripel, and blonde ale or blond. Modern abbey breweries range from microbreweries to international giants, but at least one beer writer warns against assuming that closeness of connection with a real monastery confirms a product's quality.

As of 2011, 18 certified Abbey beers existed:

- Achel sells Achel 5 Blonde (5% ABV, draught only), Achel 5 Brune (5% ABV, draught only), Achel 8 Blonde (8% ABV, tripel), Achel 8 Brune (8% ABV, dubbel), Extra Blonde (9.5% ABV.tripel), Extra Brune (9.5% ABV, dubbel).
- Abbaye de Cambron, brewed in Silly by Brasserie de Silly.
1. Abbaye de Bonne Espérance, previously brewed by Lefebvre Brewery, since 2015 more locally by La Binchoise.
- Abdij Dendermonde, brewed in Merchtem by Brouwerij De Block
- Abbaye de Saint-Martin, historically referenced to 1096, is brewed near Tournai by Brasserie Brunehaut.
- Affligem, produced for Affligem Abbey by a Heineken-owned brewery.
- Brasserie de l'Abbaye du Val-Dieu is located on the grounds of a former abbey.
- Bornem is brewed in East Flanders by Brouwerij Van Steenberge
- Ename is brewed in East Flanders by Brouwerij Roman.
- Floreffe is brewed to fund a school housed in a former monastery.
- Grimbergen, made by the large Alken Maes brewery for an extant Norbertine abbey.
- Keizersberg is brewed in East Flanders by Brouwerij Van Steenberge.
- Leffe, the Abbey brand of Stella Artois, itself part of the multinational Inbev corporation, is brewed under licence from an extant brewery. It is thought to be the first such arrangement. Leffe has global distribution.
- Maredsous, the Abbey brand of Duvel Moortgat, Belgium's second largest brewer, licensed from Maredsous Abbey.
- Postel is brewed in Opwijk by Brouwerij De Smedt.
- Ramée is brewed in Purnode by Brasserie du Bocq.
- St. Feuillien is a small independent brewery.
- Steenbrugge is brewed in Brugge by Brouwerij De Gouden Boom.
- Tongerlo is brewed in Boortmeerbeek by Brouwerij Haacht.

Other non-certified Abbey beers include:-

- Abbaye des Rocs, made by a farmers' co-operative and named after a local ruined abbey.
- Corsendonk, abbey beer brewed by a brewery in the name of the Corsendonk priory (monastery) in Oud-Turnhout
- Kasteelbier, monastic style beers brewed in a castle.
- St. Bernardus brewery, based on Watou originally brewed under contract for the abbey of St Sixtus at Westvleteren, but continues on an independent basis, in parallel with production at the monastery itself. Their range is considered a close match in recipe and style to the St Sixtus beers, which can be hard to obtain outside the area.
- Tripel Karmeliet, with a three-grain recipe, is produced by Bosteels Brewery, who also make Pauwel Kwak. Bosteels, and Tripel Karmeliet, are now part of AB InBev after a not-so-popular take-over in 2016.
- Averbode.
- Braxatorium Parcensis.
- Abdij van 't Park, an Aldi house brand abbey beer, made by Brouwerij Haacht Brasserie. Named after the abbey in Heverlee, Leuven.
- Florival, a Delhaize house brand abbey beer, made by Brouwerij Affligem. Named after the abandoned abbey of Florival, in the rural municipal of Grez-Doiceau.

=== Pils or pale lager ===
This style makes up the bulk of beer production and consumption in Belgium. Belgian Pilsners are not particularly distinctive or renowned by connoisseurs. The top brands include Jupiler (within Belgium) and Stella Artois (both brewed by Inbev), Maes pils and Cristal (both brewed by the Alken Maes branch of Heineken). Stella Artois, originating in Leuven, Belgium; is distributed globally.

The Pilsnerbeer is which is popularly called "pintje" (in Flemish, from English "pint" but in volume only 0.25 cl or roughly 1/2 pint) or "choppe" (in French) in Belgium, was the basis of the "fluitjesbier" distributed during the German occupation in WWII and under rationing. This "fluitjesbier" was watered down to about 0.8° (compared to fruitjuice which can have up to 1.5° due to natural fermentation).

=== Bock ===
Bock is a strong lager of German origin. Some Belgian brewers have produced bock-style beers what makes it a style applicable to Belgium.

=== White or wheat beer ===
This type of beer, commonly called witbier in Dutch, bière blanche in French and wheat beer in English, originated in the Flemish part of Belgium in the Middle Ages. Traditionally, it is made with a mixture of wheat and barley. Before hops became widely available in Europe, beers were flavoured with a mixture of herbs called gruit. In the later years of the Middle Ages, hops were added to the gruit. That mixture continues today in most Belgian white beers.

The production of this type of beer in Belgium had nearly ended by the late 1950s. In the town of Hoegaarden, the last witbier brewery, Tomsin, closed its doors in 1955. However, ten years later, a young farmer by the name of Pierre Celis in the same village decided to try reviving the beer. In 1966, Celis began brewing a "witbier" in his farmhouse. Ultimately, the Hoegaarden brewery took the name of the village and became successful, gaining international prominence. For instance, in 2018, only 8% of the 1.3 million hectoliters of beer produced annually were intended for the Belgian market.

Some notable current examples are Celis White, Blanche de Namur and Watou's Wit. Their alcohol strength is about 5–6 percent ABV, and these beers can be quite refreshing, especially during the warm summer months. The herb mixture traditionally includes coriander and bitter orange peel, among other herbs. White beers also have a moderate light grain sweetness from the wheat used. In recent times, brewers have been making fruit flavoured wheat beers.

=== Blonde or golden ale ===
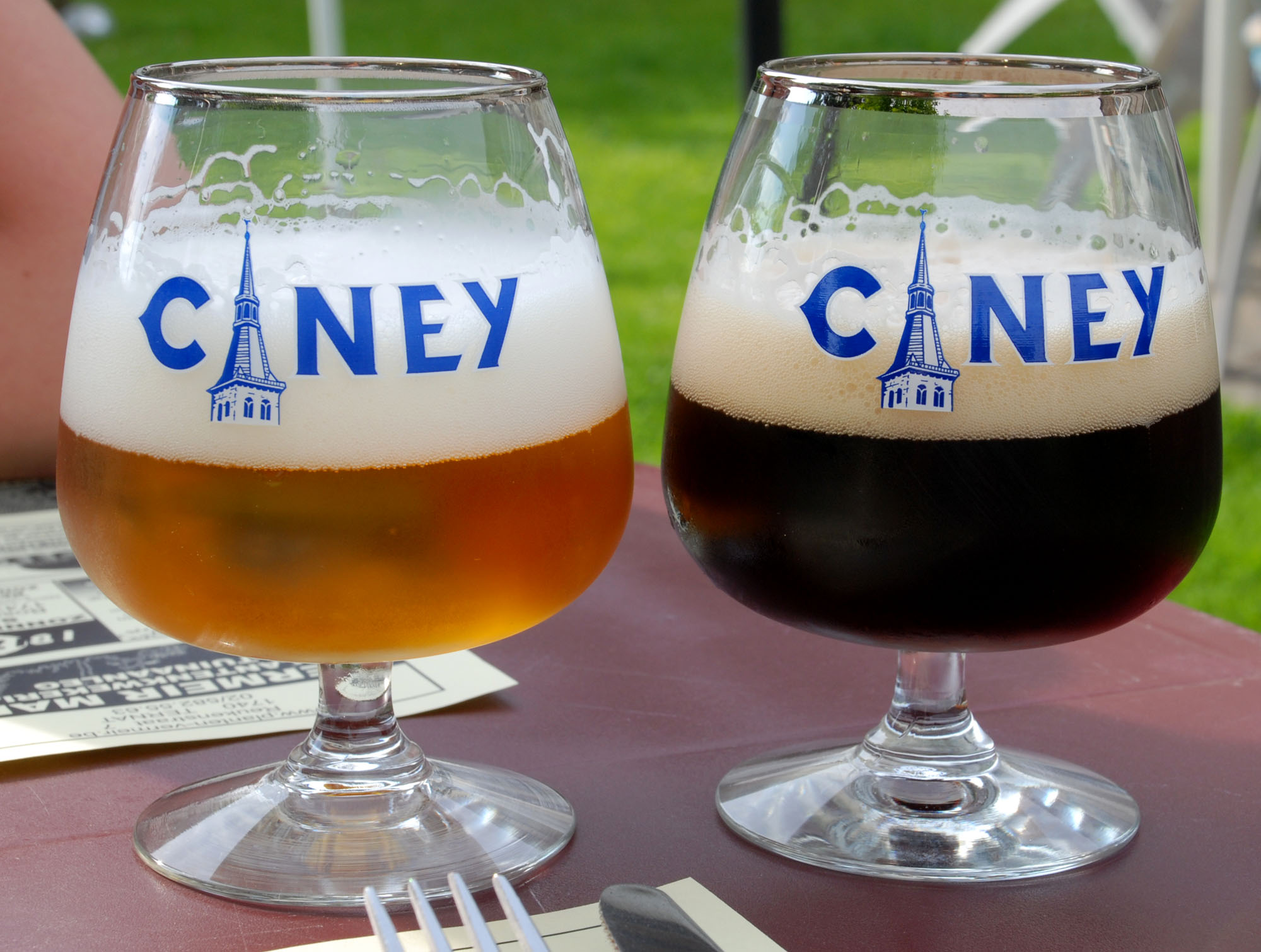
Two Ciney beers: a blonde (left) and brown (right)

These are a light variation on pale ale, often made with pilsner malt. Some beer writers regard blonde and golden ales as distinct styles, while others do not. Duvel is the archetypal Belgian blonde ale, and one of the most popular bottled beers in the country as well as being well known internationally. Its name means "Devil" and some other blonde beers follow the theme—Satan, Lucifer and Judas for example. The style is popular with Walloon brewers, the slightly hazy Moinette being the best-known example. Chouffe can be considered a spiced version (with coriander).

=== Hop-accentuated beers and India pale ale ===
A few Belgian beers are pale and assertively hopped. De Ranke's XX Bitter has a British-style name. Arabier from De Dolle Brouwers.Brouwerij Van Eecke's Poperings Hommelbier, another example, hails from Belgium's hop-growing district.

=== Lambic beers (including gueuze and fruit lambics) ===
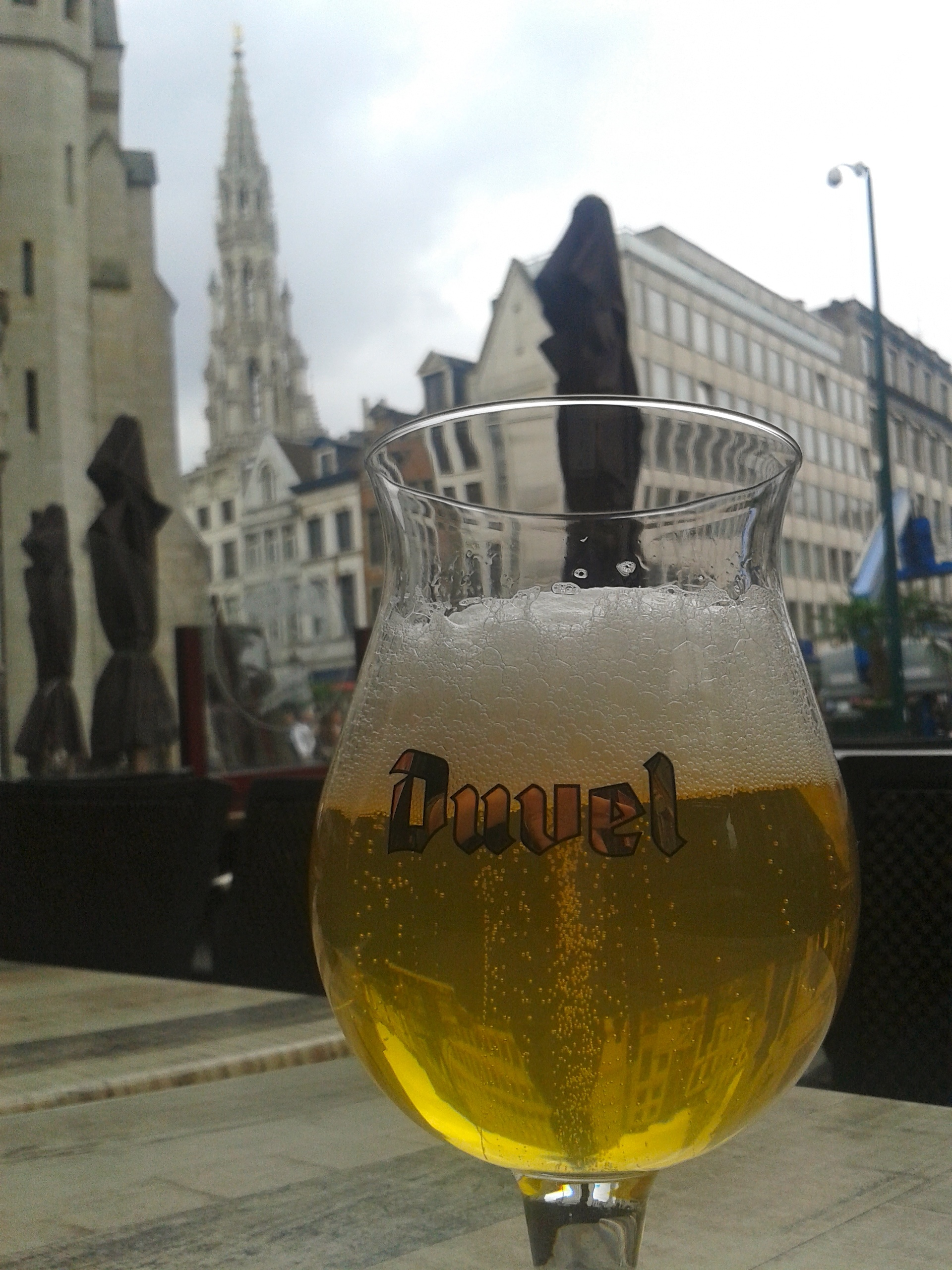
Duvel, a typical blond Belgian ale

Lambic is a wheat beer brewed in the Pajottenland region of Belgium (southwest of Brussels) by spontaneous fermentation. Most modern beers are fermented by carefully cultivated strains of brewer's yeasts; Lambic's fermentation, however, is produced by exposure to the wild yeasts and bacteria that are said to be native to the Zenne valley, in which Brussels lies. The beer then undergoes a long aging period ranging from three to six months (considered "young") to two or three years for mature. It is this unusual process which gives the beer its distinctive flavour: dry, vinous, and cidery, with a slightly sour aftertaste.

From Lambic four kinds of beer are produced: Lambic, Gueuze, Fruit Lambic, and Faro.

- The first of these, Lambic, is the unblended basic brew (young) or the refermented basic brew (old). Lambic is a draught beer which is rarely bottled, and thus only available in its area of production and a few cafes in and around Brussels.
- The youngest of the Lambic brews, Faro, which is lambic just after the first fermentation is sometimes served with sugar or caramel added to make it palatable for consumption.
- Gueuze blends old and young brews to stimulate a final fermentation, sometimes from three consecutive years (cfr sherry-method). Gueuze is the finished product, the beer that is commercialised. Top quality Geuze is bottled in large bottles (75cl) with a champagne-like cork, that require delicate handling, and controlled environmental conditions much like wine.
- Fruit beers are made by adding fruit or fruit concentrate to Lambic or a mixture of Lambic brews before the final refermenting stage. The most common type is Kriek, made with sour cherries.

=== Amber ales ===
These are beers similar to the traditional pale ales of England, although less bitterly hopped. A notable example is the 5% ABV De Koninck brand, with its distinctive half-spherical glasses (called 'bollekes'). It is popular in its native city of Antwerp. Another is Palm Speciale. Some, such as Vieux Temps, were based on British styles to please troops stationed in Belgium during World War I. Others were introduced by the UK-born brewer George Maw Johnson in the late 19th century. A very strong ambrée is brewed by "Bush" (Dubuisson), another brewery influenced by British styles.

Walloon amber or ambrée ale, such a Gauloise Ambrée, is considered to be somewhat distinct by some beer writers, and to be influenced by the French version of the ambrée style.

=== Tripel ===
Tripel is a term used originally by brewers in the Low Countries to describe a strong pale ale, and became associated with Westmalle Tripel. The style of Westmalle's Tripel and the name was widely copied by the breweries of Belgium, then the term spread to the US and other countries. Gulden Draak was awarded the best-tasting beer in the world in 1998 by the American Tasting Institute (now ChefsBest).

=== Dubbel ===
Dubbel (double) has a characteristic brown colour. It is one of the classic Abbey/Trappist types, having been developed in the 19th century at the Trappist monastery in Westmalle. Today, some commercial brewers using abbey names call their strong brown beers "Dubbel". Typically, a dubbel is between 6 and 8% abv. In addition to the dubbels made by most Trappist breweries, examples include St. Bernardus Pater, Adelardus Dubbel, Maredsous 8 and Witkap Dubbel.

Dubbels are characteristically bottle conditioned.

=== Flemish Red ===
Typified by Rodenbach, the eponymous brand that started this type over a century ago, this beer's distinguishing features from a technical viewpoint are a specially roasted malt, fermentation by a mixture of several 'ordinary' top-fermenting yeasts and a lactobacillus culture (the same type of bacteria yoghurt is made with) and maturation in oak. The result is a mildly strong 'drinking' beer with a deep reddish-brown colour and a distinctly acidic, sour yet fruity and mouthy taste. This style is closely related to Oud bruin.

=== Oud bruin, or Flemish sour brown ale ===
This style, aged in wooden casks, is a cousin to the sour "Flemish Red" style. Examples include Rodenbach, Goudenband and Petrus.

=== Brown ale ===
Regular bruin or brune beers such as Grottenbier are darker than amber ales, less sour than Flemish brown ale, and less strong than dubbel.

=== Scotch ales ===
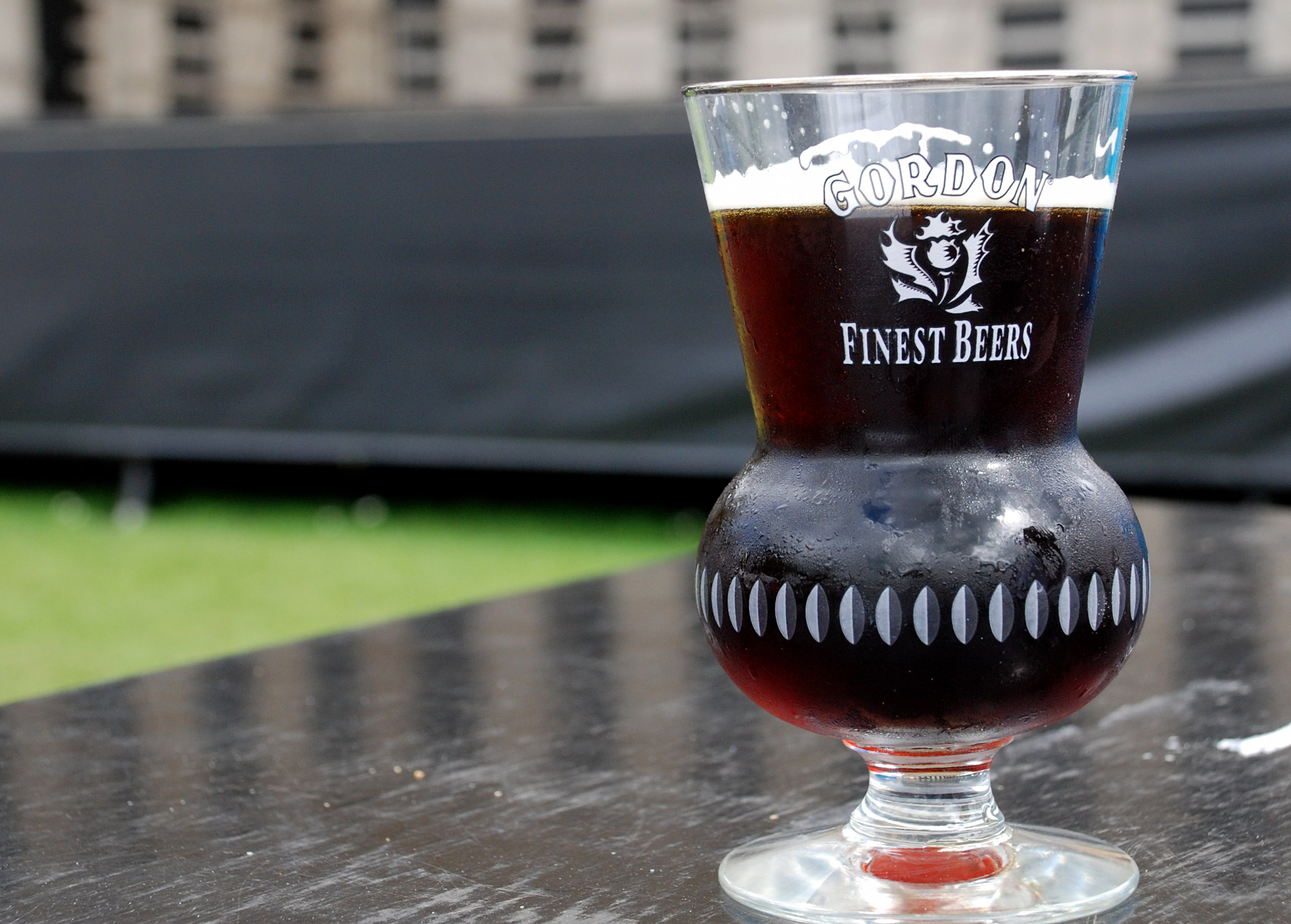
A thistle-shaped glass complements Belgian "scotch" beers.

These sweet, heavy-bodied brown ales represent a style which originated in the British Isles. The Caledonian theme is usually heavily emphasized with tartan and thistles appearing on labels. Examples include Gordon's, Scotch de Silly and La Chouffe Mc Chouffe.

=== Stout ===
Belgian stouts subdivide into sweeter and drier, and stronger and weaker versions. Examples include Callewaerts and Ellezelloise Hercule. The sweeter versions resemble the almost-defunct British style "milk stout", while the stronger ones are sometimes described as Imperial stouts.

=== Champagne beers ===
Champagne style beers are generally ales that are finished "à la méthode originale" for champagne. Examples include Grottenbier, DeuS and Malheur Bière Brut. They receive a second fermentation much like Champagne does and are stored for several months "sûr lie" while the fermentation lasts. This creates the smaller, softer bubbles that we know from Champagne, but maintains the beer flavour and style.

=== Quadrupel or Grand Cru ===
In Belgium "Grand Cru" is more often used than "Quadrupel", these beers are a mostly a blend of brews, which is often refermented as a blend.

=== Saison ===
Saison (French for "season") is the name originally given to refreshing, low-alcohol beers brewed seasonally in Wallonia, the French-speaking region of Belgium. First seen in early 19th century Liège, saisons gained notoriety as a luxury beer in 20th century Hainaut brewed by city and countryside brewers alike. By the 1980s, they were only produced on the countryside. Modern-day saisons are also brewed in other countries, particularly USA, and are generally bottle conditioned, with an average range of 5 to 8% ABV, though saisons at the more traditional 3.5% strength can still be found.

Although saison has been described as an endangered style, there has been a rise in interest in this style in recent years, with Saison Dupont being named "the Best Beer in the World" by the magazine Men's Journal in July 2005.

A related style known as a grisette was brewed with a lower ABV and with wheat added.

=== Winter or Christmas beers ===
Many breweries produce special beers during December. Most contain more alcohol than the brewery's other types of beer and may also contain spicing. An annual beer festival in Essen near Antwerp focuses on this type of beer with over 190 beers available for tasting in 2014.

=== Fruit beers (non-Lambic) ===
Some brewers that are not Lambic-brewers make fruit beers in a similar process as the Fruit Lambic beers.

All brewers of this style make fruit lambic. Many brewers of top fermentation beers such as Belgian golden ales, ambers and Flemish old brown beers, that produce beers that usually go through a multiple stage fermentation process, are catching on to the trend to make fruit beers. The process starts after the first fermentation of the wort, when sometimes sugar is added to referment the beer on wooden casks. To make fruit beer the fruit, juice or syrup is added (instead of sugar) to the first brew and refermented, these may be termed fruit lambics or fruit beers, depending on the type of first brew.

Beer that has fruit syrup or fruit lemonade added after (the final stage of) fermentation, in other words as a flavouring, are termed "Radlers" ("Shandy" in the UK) definitely not fruit beer.

=== Strong ale ===
Beers above 7%, such as tripels or strong dubbels, are referred to in some sources as Belgian strong ale, although this is not a name used by Belgian brewers.

=== Table beer ===
Table beer (tafelbier, bière de table) is a low-alcohol (typically not over 1.5%) brew sold in large bottles to be consumed with meals. It has gradually lost popularity to soft drinks and bottled water. It comes in blonde or brown versions. Table beer used to be served in school refectories until the 1980s; in the early 21st century, several organizations made proposals to reinstate this custom based on the belief that table beer is more healthy than soft drinks. Some bars serve a glass of draft lager with a small amount of table beer added, to take away the fizziness and act as a sweetener.

== Archaic styles ==
These include:

- Arge: A sour beer from Antwerp
- Faro: A beer that was drunk sweetened. Not necessarily the same as the modern Faro.
- Grisette ("little gray"): A lower-alcohol Saison drunk originally by miners in Hainaut.
- Happe: A predecessor of wheat beer, made with wheat and oats.
- Hoppe: An early hopped beer, from the mid-1500s when gruit was widely used.
- Kuyte: also called Cuyte, a strong beer originating in 16th century France, as Quente, before becoming established in Belgium. Popular with the upper classes.
- Pecce: A cheap beer.
- Roedbier: Literally, red beer. It is not clear if this was a single style.
- Uitzet: A sour beer.
- Walgbaert or Waegebaert: Similar to Happe.
- Zwaartbier: Literally, black beer. It is not clear whether this was a single style.

== Glassware ==
Belgian beers have a wide range of styles and brewing methods and are almost always served in unique, branded glassware. Each glass is designed to enhance the beer’s taste and aroma, often featuring the brewery’s logo or a beer-specific design. Belgian "heavy" or "special" beers (stronger or bottled beers) are usually served in more elaborate branded beer glassware. Some glasses are etched on the bottom; typically with the brewery’s logo, to nucleate a stream of bubbles for maintaining a nice head. Unless the bar is out of the specific glass that goes with that beer it is usually served in its own glass. Most bartenders or waitresses will apologize if the beer comes in a different glass.

Pils (pilsner) or pale lager, remains the most widely produced and consumed beer style in Belgium. One of the most typical Belgian pilsner glasses is the ribbed glass, often referred to as the ribbelke or ribbelglas. This continues to be the preferred glass for consuming pilsner among Belgians, to the extent that attempts by breweries to replace it with more elaborate glassware, such as Stella Artois’ introduction of the chalice glass which is commonly used outside Belgium, have sparked public outcry and faced strong consumer resistance. The Belgian pilsner glass originated between 1860 and 1900. Its ribbed base was designed to minimize heat transfer from the drinker’s hand, preventing the beer from warming. Additionally, the glass’s tall, narrow, and straight shape is suited to pilsner beers due to their lower foaming protein content, necessitating a smaller diameter to maintain an appropriate head. A regional variation is the Boerke glass, which translates to "small farmer". The question of which glass is best suited for Belgian pilsner remains a subject of debate, influenced by factors such as personal preference, brand loyalty, tradition, regional customs, and differing opinions among Belgians.

One of the more common types is the tulip glass. A tulip glass not only helps trap the aroma, but also aids in maintaining large heads, creating a visual and olfactory sensation. The body is bulbous, but the top flares out to form a lip which helps foam head retention.

A vessel similar to a champagne flute is the preferred serving vessel for Belgian (fruit) Lambics, Gueuze and fruit beers. The narrow shape helps maintain carbonation, while providing a strong aromatic front. Flute glasses display the lively carbonation, sparkling colour, and soft lacing of this distinct style.

Traditionally, lambic beers including gueuze and fruit lambics are served in a tall glass resembling the ribbed pilsner glass. However, the edges and base of the lambic glass are significantly thicker; which originated from the old custom of grinding sugar at the bottom of the glass before serving, allowing drinkers to sweeten the beer to their taste, as lambic styles are known for their intense sourness. The glass is commonly referred to as a lambiekstoemper (or "lambic stomper"), a name that reflects the practice of crushing sugar with a tool similar to a cocktail muddler.

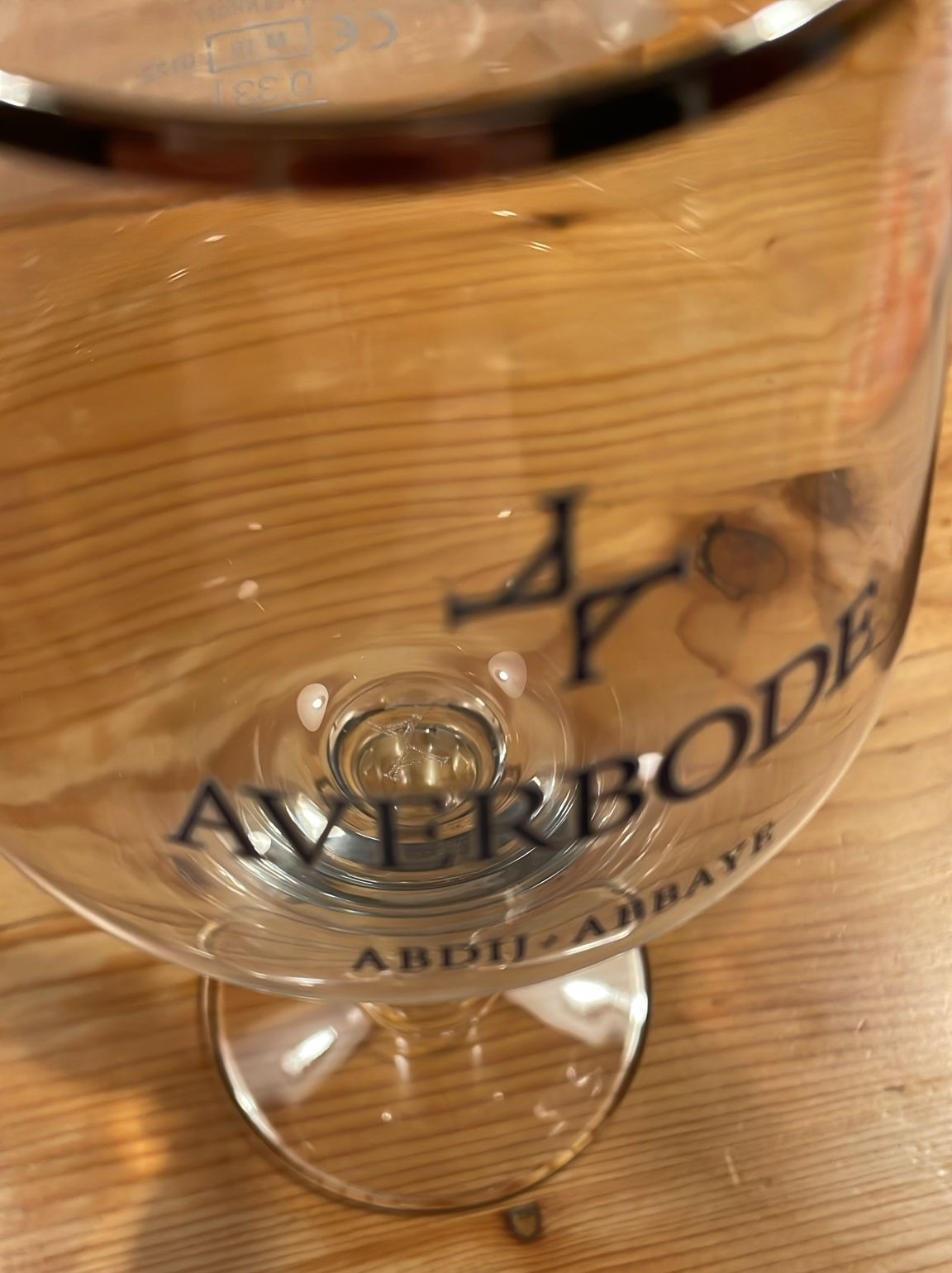
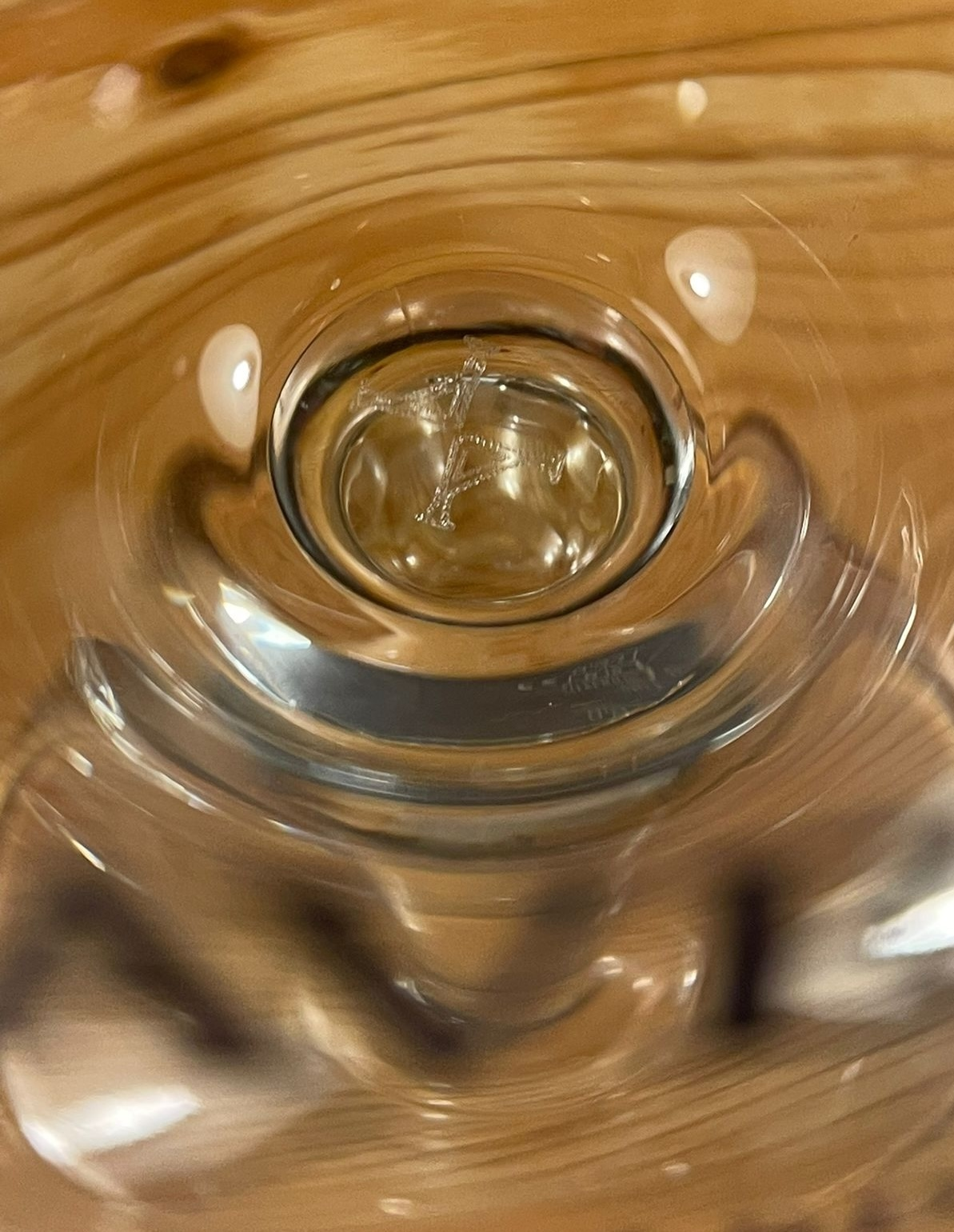
A close-up of an Averbode Abbey beer glass, with the etched logo of the abbey brewery at its base

Chalices and goblets are large, stemmed, bowl-shaped glasses mainly associated with Trappist and Abbey ales. The distinction between goblet and chalice is typically in the glass thickness. Goblets tend to be more delicate and thin, while the chalice is heavy and thick walled.

However, a more recent addition, though not traditionally Belgian, is the TeKu beer glass, developed in 2006 by Teo Musso and Kuaska (hence the acronym). Designed as a universal beer glass, it has since been embraced by the craft beer community, particularly for styles such as pale ales, IPAs, stouts...

In addition to the profusion of glasses provided by brewers, some Belgian beer cafés serve beer in their own "house" glassware. An example is La Lunette in Brussels.

== Distribution ==
The majority of Belgian beer brands are sold in reusable bottles. Draught beers tend mostly to be pale lagers, wheat beers, regional favourites such as kriek in Brussels or De Koninck in Antwerp; and the occasional one-off.

These days, Belgian beers are sold in brown- (or sometimes dark green-) tinted glass bottles (to avoid negative effects of light on the beverage) and sealed with a cork, a metal crown cap, or sometimes both. Some beers are bottle conditioned, meaning reseeded with yeast so that an additional fermentation may take place. Different bottle sizes exist: 25 cl, 33 cl, 37.5 cl, 75 cl and multiples of 75. (8, 12, 24 or multiples of 24 fl. oz.) The 37.5 cl size is usually for lambics. Other beers are generally bottled in 25 or 33 cl format (depending on brands). The bigger bottles (75 cl) are sold almost in every food shop but customers do not always have an extensive choice. Bottles larger than 75 cl are named following the terminology used for champagne and are limited in quantity. In Brussels or Walloon Belgian cafés, you can order orders a demi (English: "half"), which is a 50 cl draught beer.

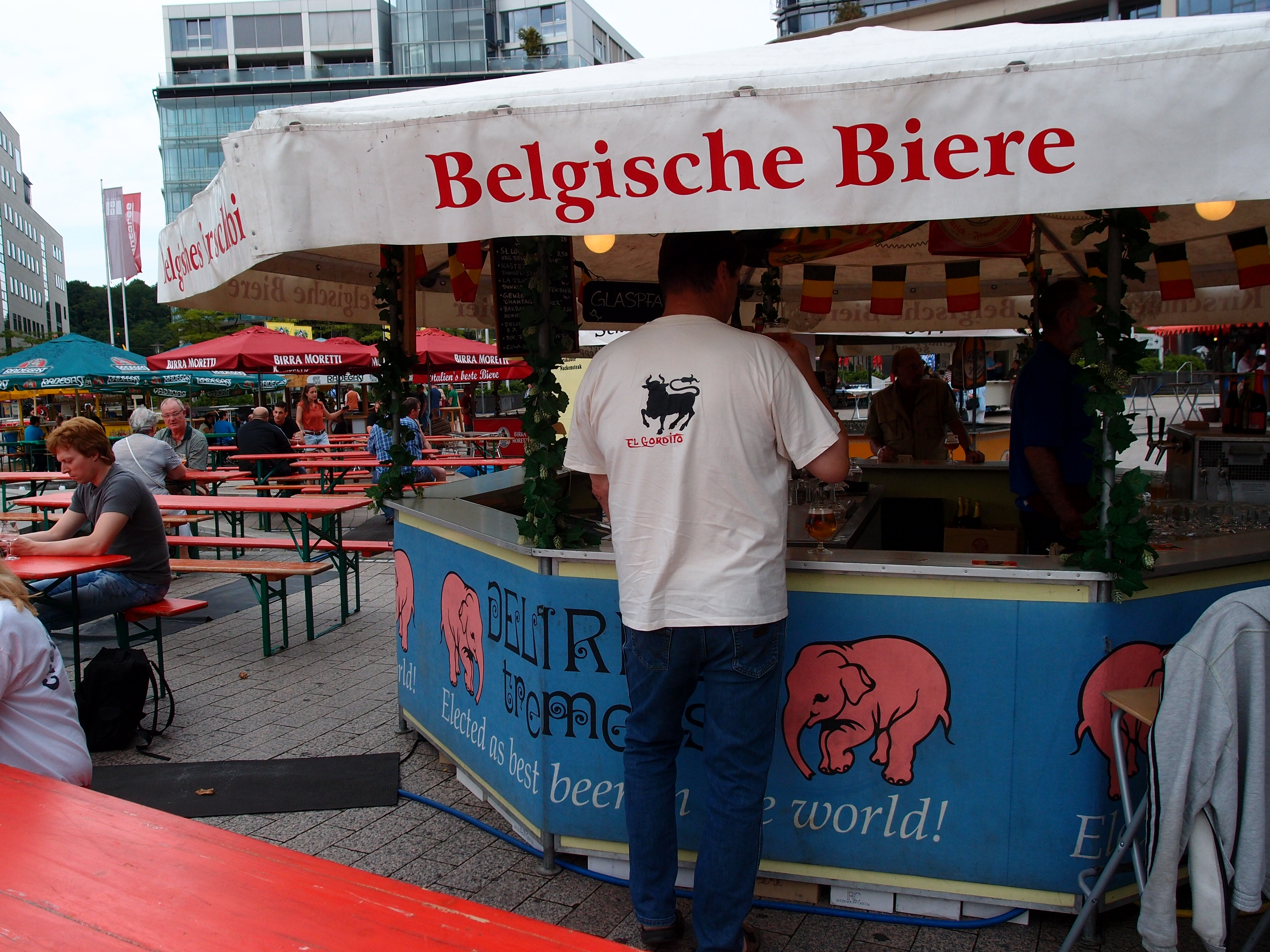
Belgian Beer at the international Bierbörse in Cologne.

The prominence of the Belgian beer culture is reflected in the extensive range of beers offered in nearly every café across the country. Belgium contains thousands of cafés that offer a wide selection of beers, a typical beer menu ranges from at least half a dozen draught beers and two dozen bottled beers of different types in a neighborhood café, to over 1000 in a specialist beer café. Among the most famous are "Beer Circus", "Moeder Lambic", and "Delirium Café" in Brussels; "Billie's Bier Kafétaria", "de Kulminator" and "Oud Arsenaal" in Antwerp, "Barnabeer" in Namur, "De Garre" and "'t Brugs Beertje" in Bruges, "Het Botteltje" in Ostend, "Het Hemelrijk" in Hasselt, "Het Waterhuis aan de Bierkant", "De Dulle Griet" and "Trappistenhuis" in Ghent, "De Blauwe Kater" in Leuven, the Vaudrées in Liège and the "Stillen Genieter" in Mechelen. Although many major brands of beer are available at most supermarkets, off-licences located throughout the country generally offer a far wider selection, albeit at somewhat higher prices.

=== International distribution ===
In 2024, Belgium exported around 70% of its beer production, amounting to approximately 14 million hectoliters. Some draught-beer brands produced by AB InBev like Stella Artois, Hoegaarden and Leffe are available in several European countries. Aside from these, mostly bottled beer is exported across Europe. Cafés, exclusively or primarily offering Belgian beers, exist beyond Belgium in Australia, New Zealand, Canada, France, the United Kingdom and the United States, amongst others. Some beer festivals outside Belgium have a Belgian beer bar as an alternative to local products. In North America, a growing number of draught Belgian beer brands have started to become available, often at "Belgian Bars". Such brands include Brasserie Brunehaut, Karmeliet, Kwak, Maredsous, Mont Saint-Aubert, Delirium, Palm, Rodenbach and St. Feuillien.

== Beer festivals ==
Belgium has a number of beer festivals including:

- The BAB-bierfestival, held every year in February in Bruges

== Beer cuisine ==
A number of traditional Belgian dishes use beer as an ingredient. One is carbonade (French) or stoverij or stoofvlees (Dutch), a stew of beef cooked in beer, similar to Boeuf bourguignon. The beer used is typically the regional speciality—lambic in Brussels, De Koninck in Antwerp, and so on—so that the taste of the dish varies. Another is rabbit in gueuze. In't Spinnekopke, Brussels, and Den Dyver, Bruges are famed for their beer cookery. In 1998 Anheuser-Busch InBev started a worldwide chain of bars/restaurants, Belgian Beer Cafe, serving typical Belgian dishes combined with Belgian Beer.

The varied nature of Belgian beers makes it possible to match them against each course of a meal, for instance:

- Wheat beer with seafood or fish.
- Blond beers or tripel with chicken or white meat
- Dubbel or other dark beers with dark meat
- Fruit lambics with dessert

== Appreciation and organizations ==
Beer Passion is a magazine, which also organizes a beer festival. "Zythos" is the name of the main consumer's organization, successor to the earlier OBP (Objectieve Bierproevers). The Belgian Brewers' Association represents breweries. It organizes beer festivals and an open breweries day. The Knighthood of the Mashstaff honours individuals who have made an outstanding contribution to brewing, and pays tribute to Gambrinus and Saint Arnold.

Beer writers who have written extensively on Belgian beer include Belgians Peter Crombeq, Gert van Lierde and Erik Verdonck, and Britons Michael Jackson and Tim Webb.

On 1 December 2016, in the eleventh session of the Intergovernmental Committee for the Safeguarding of the Intangible Cultural Heritage held in the United Nations Economic Commission for Africa Conference Centre, Addis Ababa, as an appreciation towards the beer culture in Belgium, it was inscribed on the Representative List of the Intangible Cultural Heritage of Humanity.

== Belgian beer brands ==
The following list contains beers that are brewed in Belgium. Not to be confused with "Belgian style" beers that are produced in other countries, and may or may not resemble a style that is specific to Belgium.

Beer name	Beer style	colour	ABV	Brewery
Chimay Gold: "Doree"	trappist pale ale	gold	4.8%	Chimay Brewery (official trappist)
Chimay Blue: "Grande Reserve"	trappist dark ale	dark	9.0%	Chimay Brewery (official trappist)
Chimay Red: "Premiere"	trappist dubbel	dark	7.0%	Chimay Brewery (official trappist)
Chimay White: "Cinq Cents Tripel"	trappist tripel	dark	8.0%	Chimay Brewery (official trappist)
Ciney Blonde	strong pale ale	gold	7.0%	Alken-Maes (part of Heineken and Carlsberg)
Ciney Brune	strong dark ale	dark	7.0%	Alken-Maes (part of Heineken and Carlsberg)
Grimbergen	abbey beer		6.7%	Alken-Maes (part of Heineken and Carlsberg)
Cuvée des Trolls	strong pale ale	gold	7.0%	Dubuisson Brewery
Delirium de Noel (Christmas beer)	strong amber ale	amber	10.0%	Huyghe Brewery
Delirium Nocturnum	strong dark ale	dark	8.5%	Huyghe Brewery
Delirium Tremens	Strong Blonde Ale	gold	8.5%	Huyghe Brewery
DeuS Brut des Flandres	champagne beer	gold	11.5%	Bosteels Brewery (part of AB InBev)
Pauwel Kwak	strong pale ale	amber	8.4%	Bosteels Brewery (part of AB InBev)
Tripel Karmeliet	abbey beer tripel	gold	8.4%	Bosteels Brewery (part of AB InBev)
Duchesse de Bourgogne	oud bruin		6.2%	Verhaeghe Brewery
Duvel	strong golden ale	gold	8.5%	Duvel Moortgat
Duvel Single Fermented	strong golden ale	gold	6.8%	Duvel Moortgat
Maredsous Blonde	abbey beer	gold	6.0%	Duvel Moortgat
Maredsous Brune	abbey beer dubbel	dark	8.0%	Duvel Moortgat
Maredsous Tripel	abbey beer tripel	gold	10.0%	Duvel Moortgat
Framboise Boon	framboise (raspberry lambic)		5.0%	Boon Brewery
Kriek Boon	kriek (cherry lambic)	red	4.0%	Boon Brewery
Gulden Draak	strong dark ale	dark	10.5%	Brouwerij Van Steenberge
Hoegaarden	wheat beer	gold	4.9%	Hoegaarden Brewery (part of AB InBev)
Jupiler	pale lager	gold	5.2%	Brewery Piedbœuf (part of AB InBev)
Leffe Blonde	abbey beer	blond	6.6%	Interbrew (part of AB InBev)
Leffe Bruin	abbey beer	dark	6.5%	Interbrew (part of AB InBev)
Stella Artois	pale lager	gold	5.2%	Interbrew (part of AB InBev)
Lindemans Framboise	framboise (raspberry lambic)	red	2.5%	Lindemans Brewery
Lindemans Kriek	kriek (cherry lambic)	red	4.0%	Lindemans Brewery
Lindemans Pêcheresse	peach lambic	gold	2.5%	Lindemans Brewery
Mouten Kop	IPA	amber	6.0%	Brewery De Graal
Rodenbach Original	sour, non-labic fruit beer	red brown	5.2%	Palm Breweries (part of Royal Swinkels)
Rodenbach Grand Cru	sour, non-labic fruit beer	red brown	6.2%	Palm Breweries (part of Royal Swinkels)
Rodenbach Vintage	sour, non-labic fruit beer	red Brown	7.0%	Palm Breweries (part of Royal Swinkels)
Rodenbach Caractère Rouge	sour, non-labic fruit beer	Red brown	7.0%	Palm Breweries (part of Royal Swinkels)
St. Bernardus Abt 12	abbey beer quadrupel	brown	10.0%	St. Bernardus Brewery
St. Bernardus Prior 8	abbey beer dubbel	brown	8.0%	St. Bernardus Brewery
St. Bernardus Tripel	abbey beer tripel	gold	8.0%	St. Bernardus Brewery
Trappistes Rochefort 6	trappist dubbel		7.5%	Rochefort Abbey (official trappist)
Trappistes Rochefort 8	trappist tripel		9.2%	Rochefort Abbey (official trappist)
Trappistes Rochefort 10	trappist quadrupel		11.3%	Rochefort Abbey (official trappist)
Zondaar	tripel		8 %	Brouwerij Boelens

== See also ==
- Beer and breweries by region
- High Council for Artisanal Lambic Beers
- Méthode Champenoise
- List of Belgian beers
- Veronus of Lembeek
- Gambrinus
