= Ambrée =

Ambrée may refer to:

- Beer in Belgium § Amber ales
- Pale ale § Amber ale
- Lager § Dark lager
