= Corsendonk =

Belgian beer brand created in 1982

Coordinates: 51°17′1″N 5°0′34″E

- Corsendonk logo
- Type: beer brand
- Inception: 1982
- Current supplier: Brasserie Du Bocq

Corsendonk is a Belgian beer brand. The brandname refers to the Priory of Corsendonk in Oud-Turnhout; which was in operation from 1398 to 1784, and was rebuilt in 1968, as a hotel complex by new owners Corsendonk Hotels. In 1982, on the 125th anniversary of the Oud-Turnhout municipality, Jef Keersmaekers, grandson of Antonius Keersmaekers who had founded a brewery in 1906, was approached by the local tourist office to use the Corsendonk name for its abbey association, as an abbey beer marketing technique. He launched Pater Noster, now called Corsendonk Pater (or "Abbey Brown Ale" when marketed in America), and Agnus Dei, now called Corsendonk Agnus (or "Abbey Pale Ale" when marketed in America). As the family brewery had closed down in 1953, the beers were contracted out to other breweries, including Brasserie Du Bocq, who now brew all the brands. Other brands include Corsendonk Blond, Corsendonk Bruin and Corsendonk Christmas Ale.

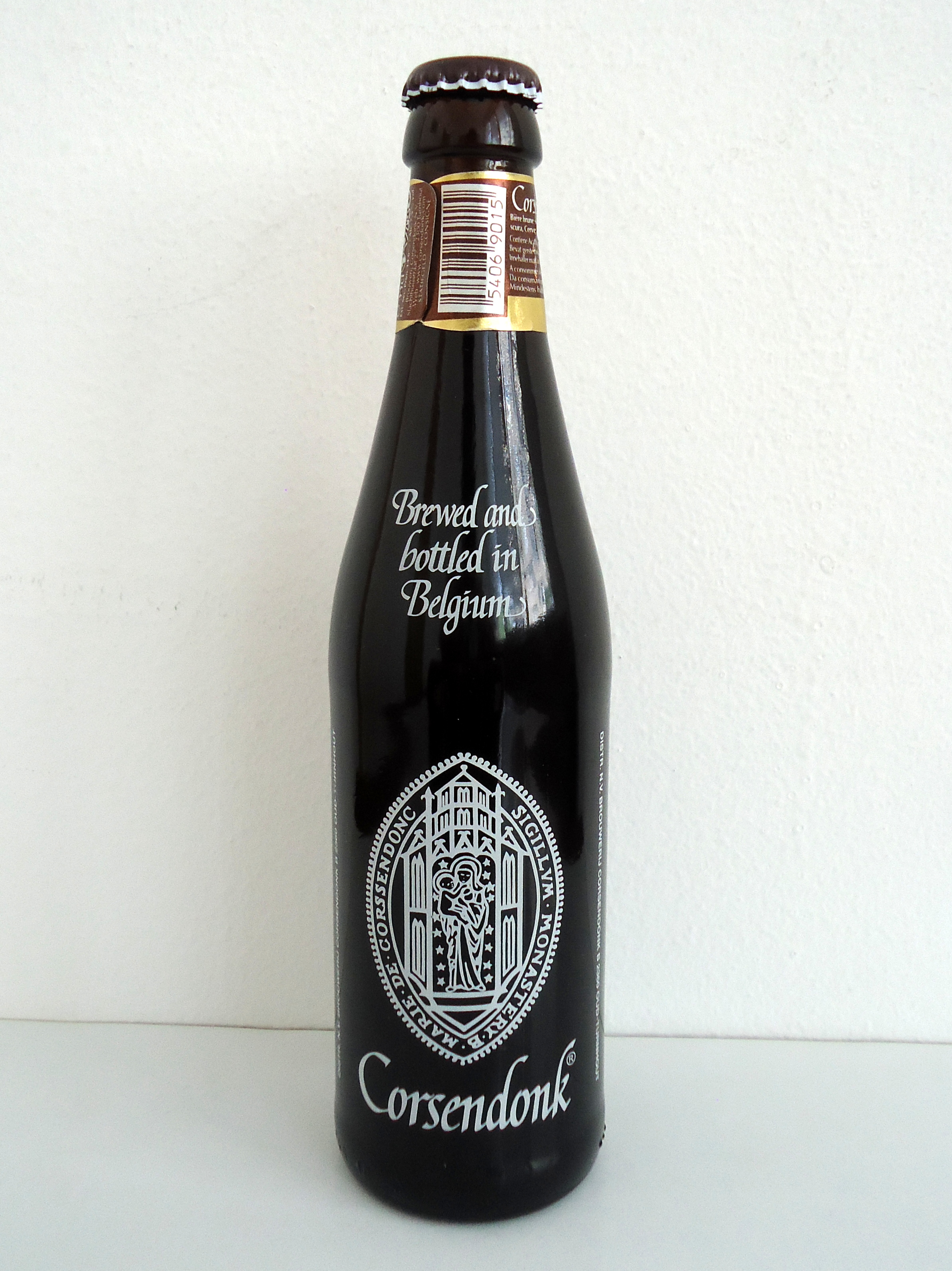
Corsendonk Pater, sold as Abbey Brown Ale in USA
