= Mouten Kop =

Belgian beer

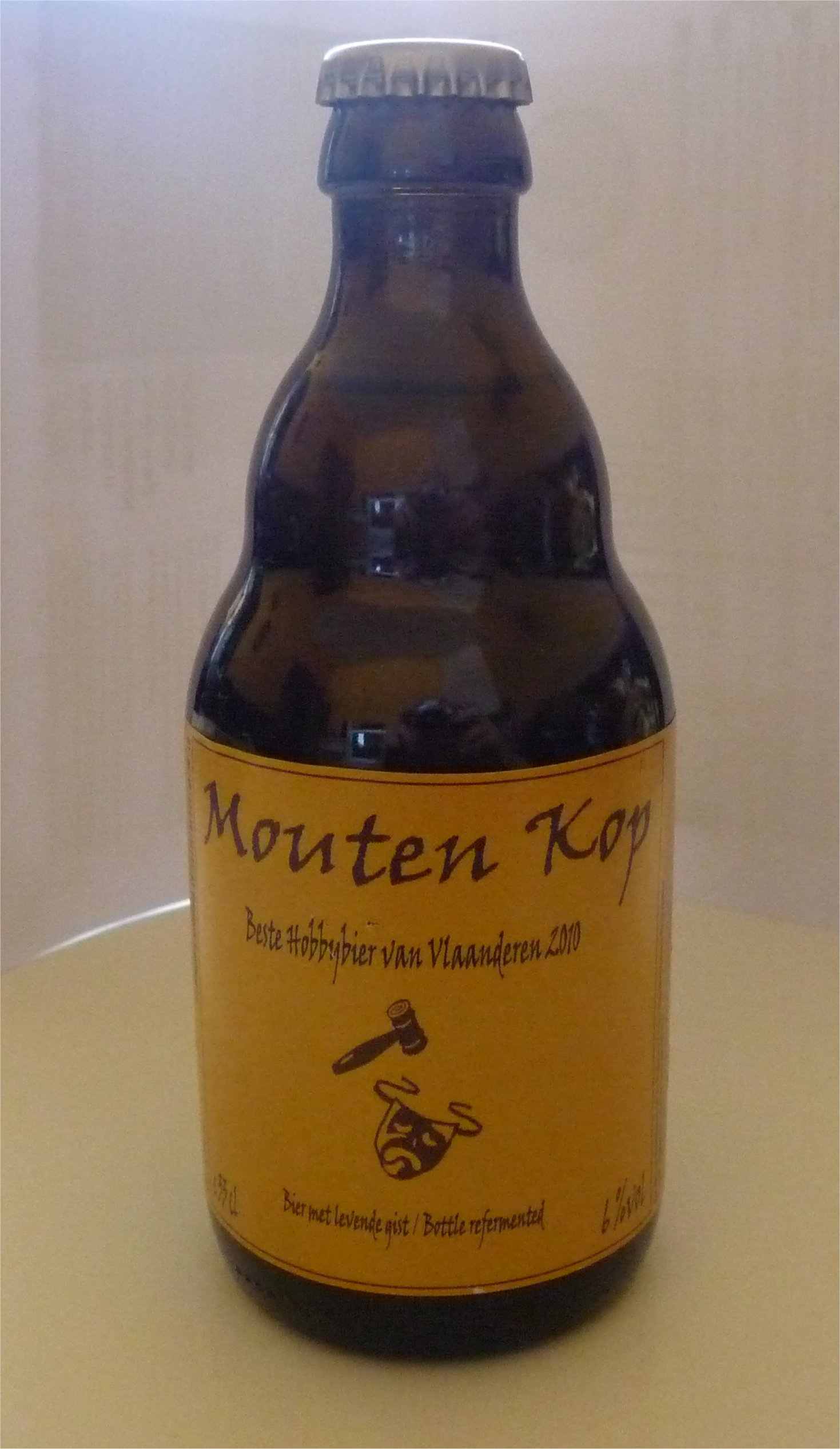
- Manufacturer: Brewery De Graal
- Introduced: 2010
- Alcohol by volume: 6%
- Style: India Pale Ale
- IBU scale: 35

Mouten Kop is a Belgian beer, brewed in concession by Brewery De Graal in Lochristi, Belgium, for the Hopjutters.

== History ==
Mouten Kop is the first beer of the "Hopjutters". The Hopjutters are four young brewers: Hans, Joke, Nathalie and Olivier. That same year, 2010, Mouten Kop was voted "Best Homebrewed Beer in Flanders 2010" by a jury of professional brewers.
The name of the beer is a combination of houten kop and mout. "Houten kop" literally means "wooden head"; it's an expression referring to a hangover. "Mout" is "malt", a typical ingredient of beer.

== The beer ==
Mouten Kop is an amber-coloured beer, style India Pale Ale, with an alcohol volume of 6% abv and a bitterness of 35 IBU. The ingredients are barley malt, water, hop, yeast and aromatic spices: coriander, cardamom and orange peel. Mouten Kop is bottle refermented beer. It is sold in bottles of 33 centilitres.
