= St. Feuillien Brewery =

Belgian brewery

St. Feuillien
- Industry: Brewery
- Founded: 1873
- Headquarters: Le Roeulx, Belgium
- Products: Beer
- Website: http://www.st-feuillien.com/FSTFeuillienENG.html

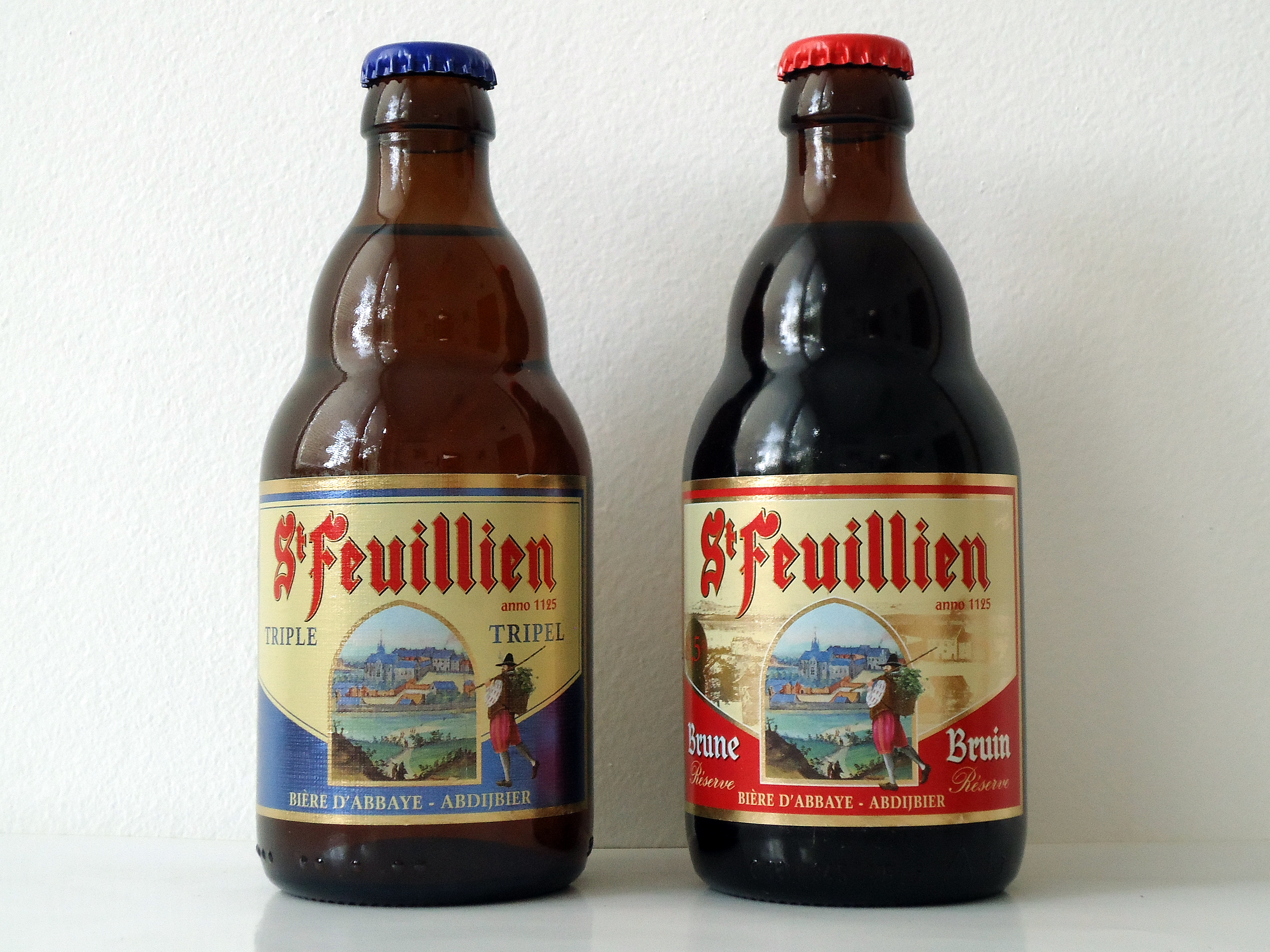
Saint-Feuillien beers

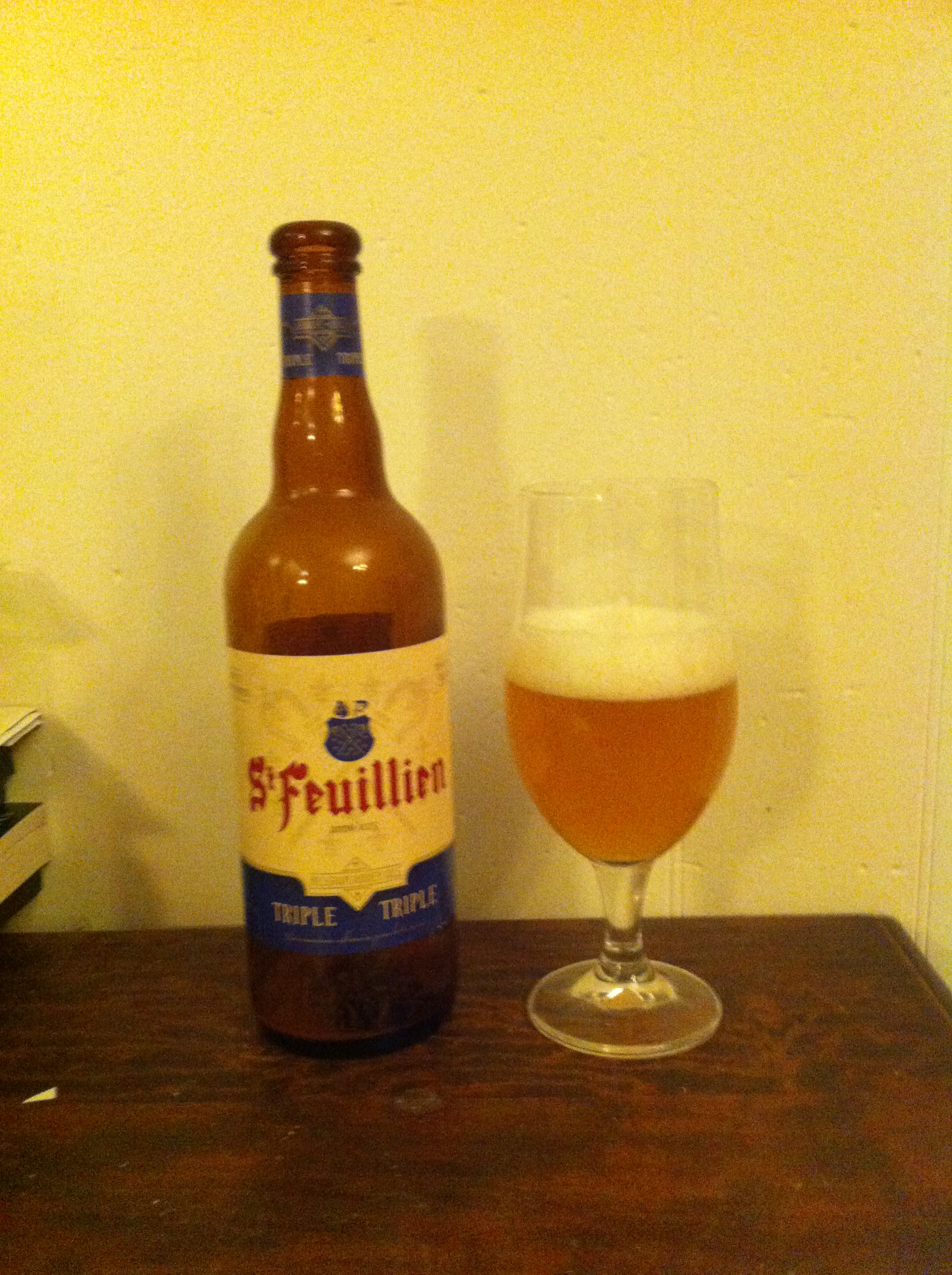
0.75 liter bottle of St. Feuillien Triple

The St. Feuillien Brewery is a Belgian brewery in Le Roeulx, Belgium, which was founded in 1873. The brewery, which makes abbey-style beer, has been operated by the Friart family all this time, except for an 11-year hiatus that ended in 1998. Beers brewed by St. Feuillien include a brown ale ("brune") and a tripel, the latter of which praised as one of the best tripels available. A recent addition to their selection is a saison, "which has grown steadily to be up with the best". In 2016, the brewery launched an IPA called Belgian Coast.

St. Feuillien introduced a Christmas beer in 1969, which by 2013 accounted for 8% of their total production.

== See also ==
- Belgian beer
