= Huyghe Brewery =

Belgian brewery

Coordinates: 51.000870°N 3.805200°E

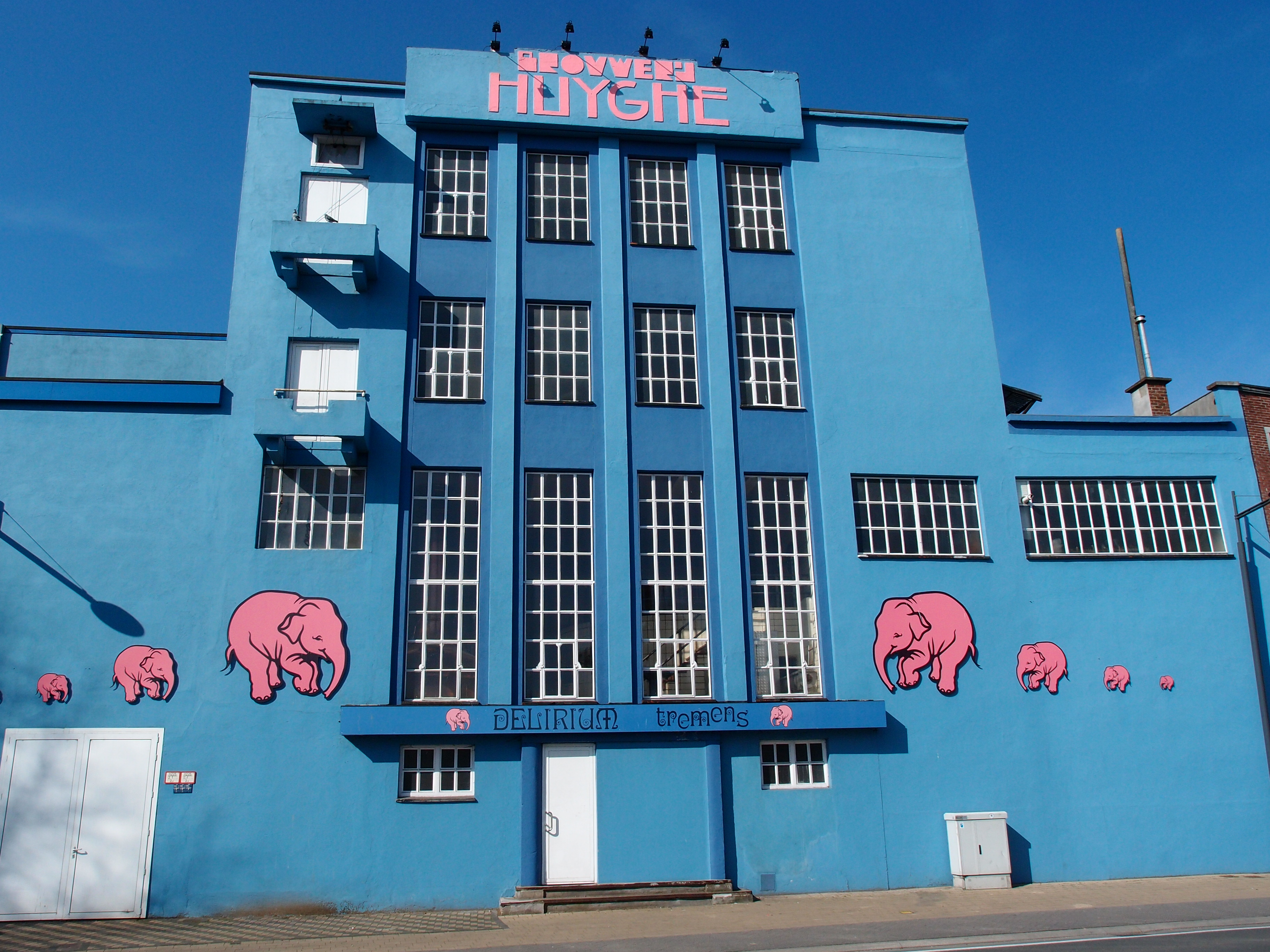
- Brouwerij Huyghe in 2014
- Native name: Brouwerij Huyghe
- Industry: Alcoholic beverage
- Founded: 1906
- Founder: Leon Huyghe
- Headquarters: Melle, Belgium
- Products: Beer
- Owner: Alain Delaet
- Number of employees: 20
- Website: https://www.delirium.be/

Huyghe Brewery (Dutch: Brouwerij Huyghe) is a brewery founded in 1906 by Leon Huyghe in the city of Melle in East Flanders, Belgium. Its flagship beer is Delirium Tremens, a golden ale.

== History ==
In 1906, Leon Huyghe purchased an existing brewery in Melle (at a site that had been in operation brewing beer since 1654). The brewery adopted the present name in 1938. While the company initially brewed a regular pilsner, it soon began brewing the kinds of beers now typically known as "Belgian".

== Operations and products ==
The beers created at Huyghe include a series of beers under the "Delirium" tag that feature pink elephants on their labels. The best known of these is Delirium Tremens, a blonde, Belgian ale. Other beers brewed at Huyghe include a Christmas beer and a beer called "Deliria", selected to be brewed by the company from 65 entries made by women brewers. In addition, the company makes a number of fruit beers with low ABV.

Huyghe has acquired several smaller Belgian breweries, including Arteveld Grand Cru in 1987, Brouwerij Biertoren in 1993, Brouwerij Dam in 1994, and Brouwerij Villers in 1999.

=== Selected beers ===
- Delirium Nocturnum - Belgian brown ale, 8.5% alcohol
- Delirium Noël - a winter seasonal offering, 10.0% ABV.
- Delirium Tremens - Belgian blond ale, 8.5% alcohol
  - Named as "Best Beer in the World" in 2008 at the World Beer Championships in Chicago, Illinois. Stuart Kallen gives it the number one spot in his book, The 50 Greatest Beers in the World.

==== Name controversy ====
The Delirium Tremens beer product was banned in the United States for a period of time when it was first exported there. The reason was that the authorities thought the imagery and name of the beer were "too provocative" and "encouraged excess drinking".

== Gallery ==
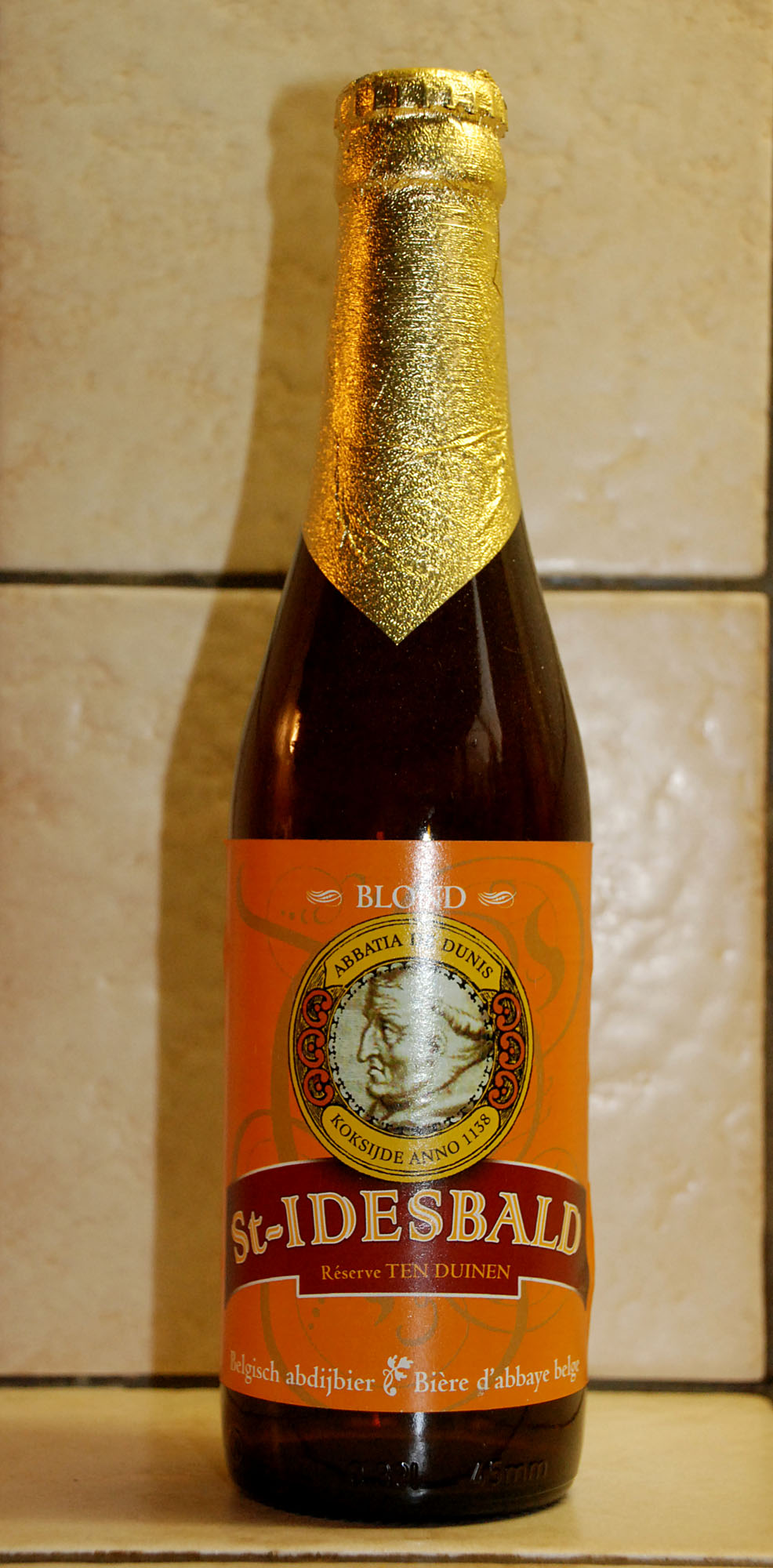
St. Idesbald blond

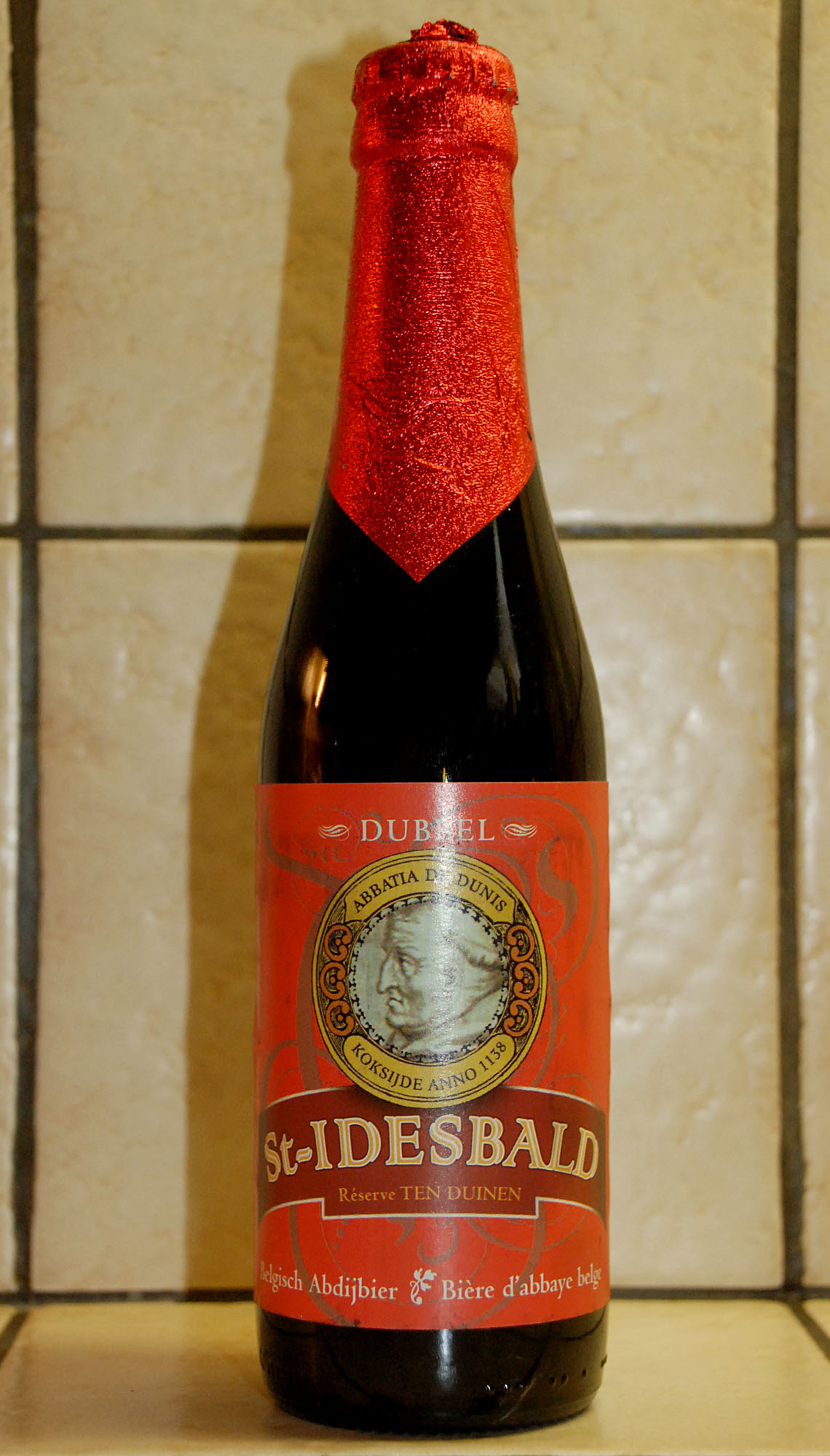
St. Idesbald dubbel

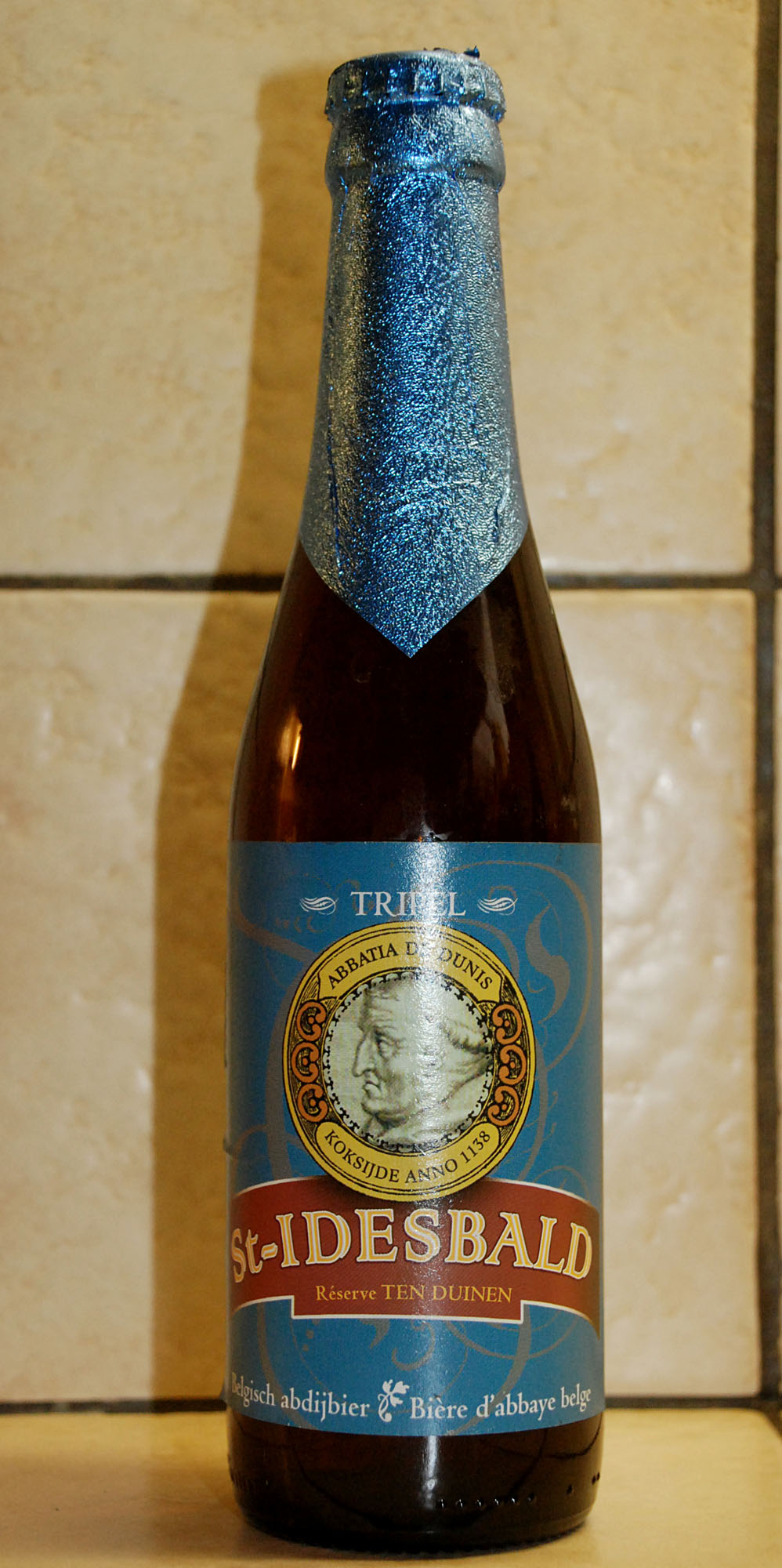
St. Idesbald tripel

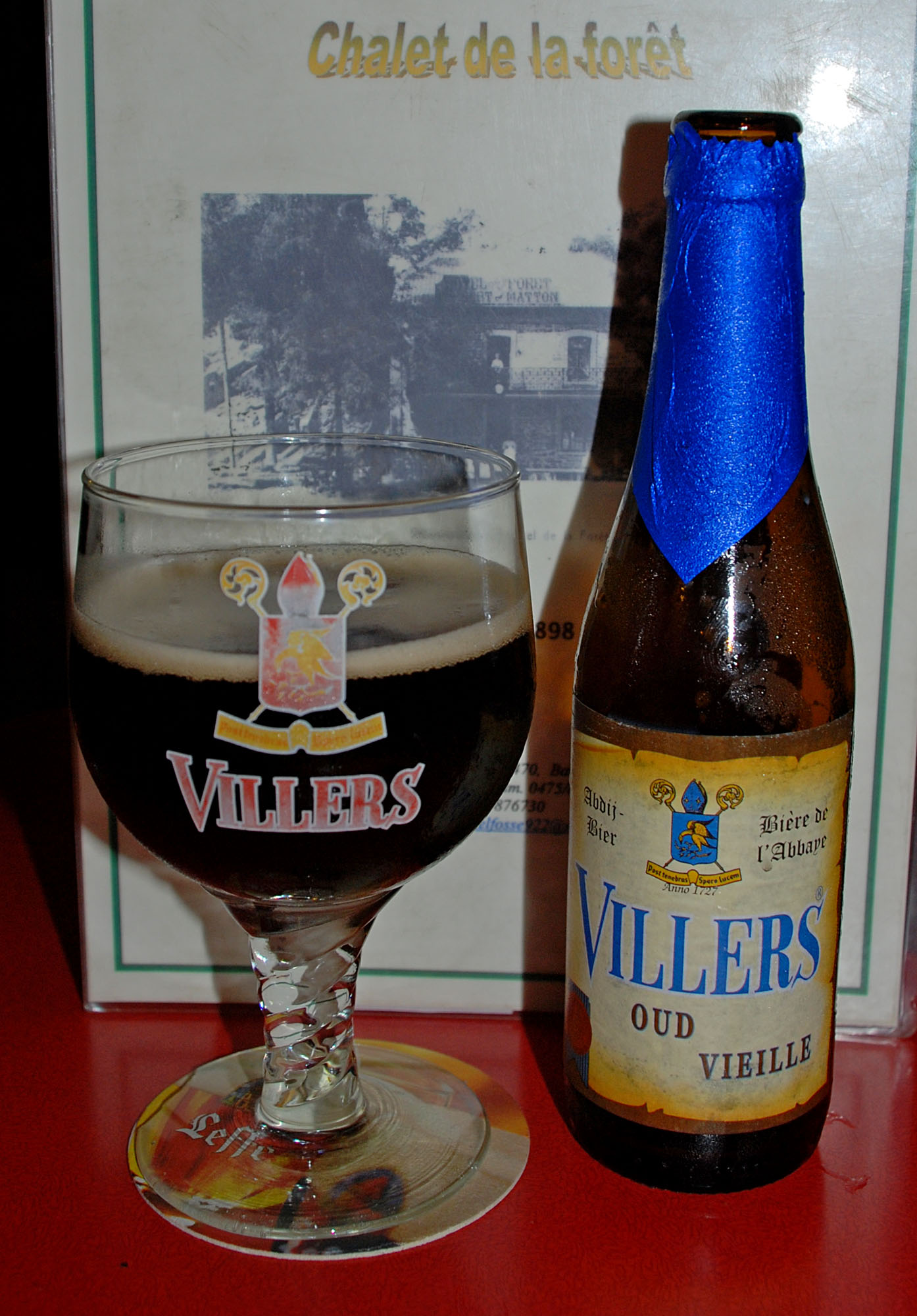
Viller's Brune

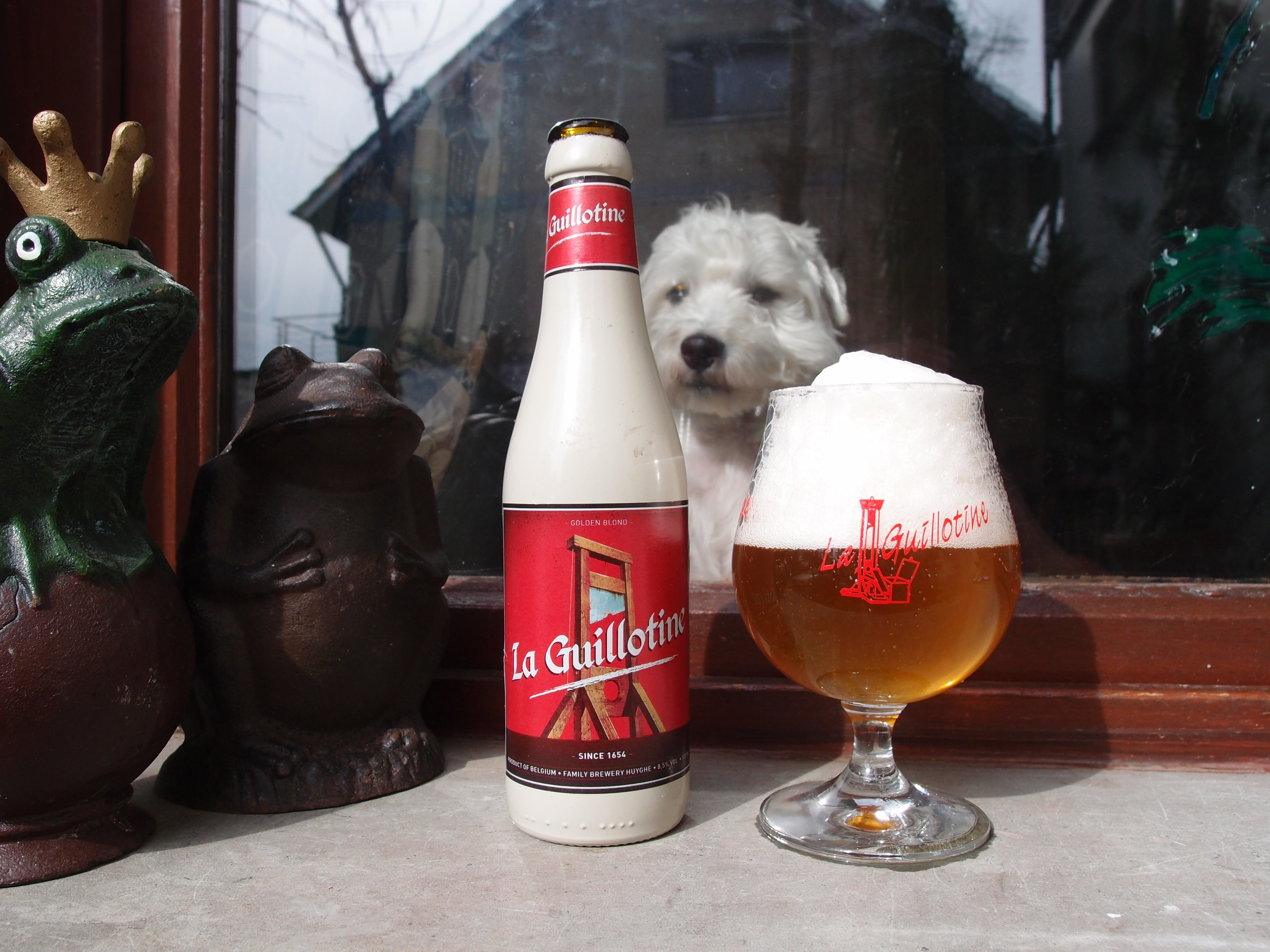
La Guillotine Bier 3

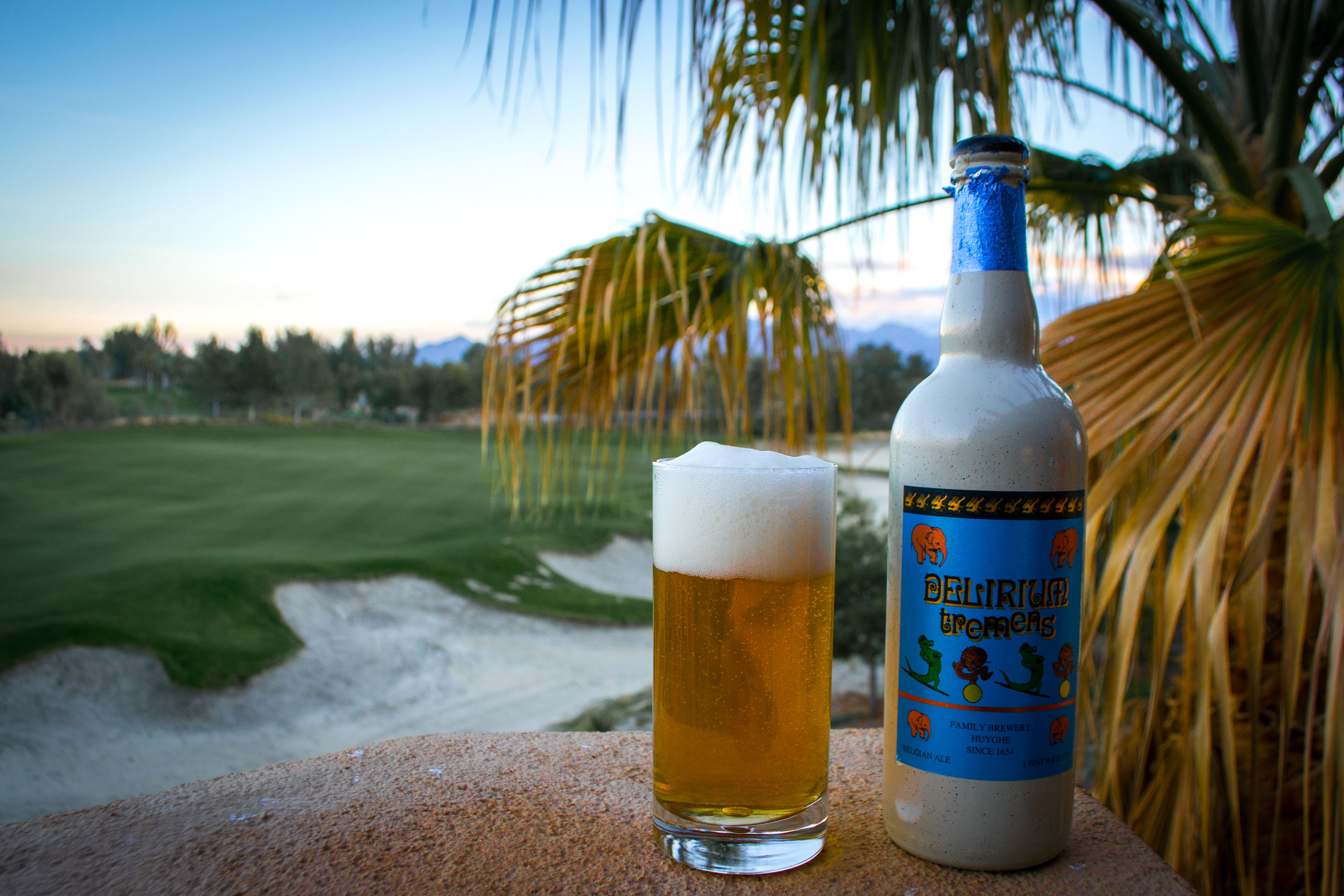
Delirium Tremens in Palm Springs

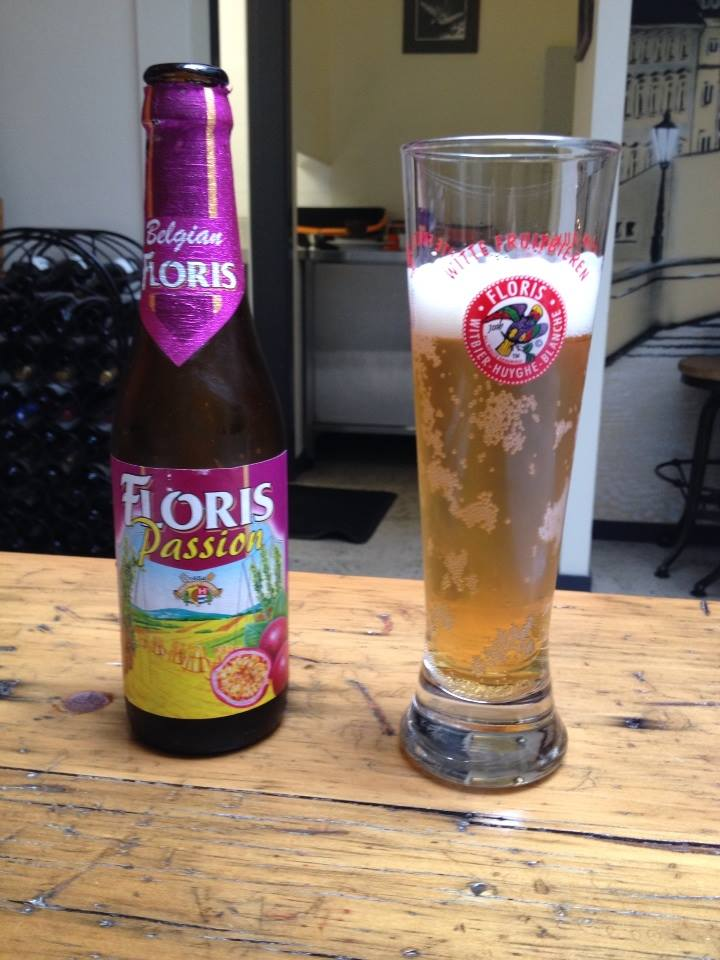
Floris Passionfruit cider/beer, produced by the Huyghe Brewery

== See also ==
- Beer in Belgium
