= Belgian Beer Café =

Belgian restaurant chain

Belgian Beer Cafe
- Type: Private
- Industry: Restaurant, beer cafe
- Founded: 1998
- Headquarters: Leuven, Belgium
- Number of locations: 60+
- Website: www.belgianbeercafe.com

Belgian Beer Café is a chain of concept cafe-restaurants specializing in Belgian-inspired food and Belgian beers. The company was founded in Brussels in 1998 by InBev and now is part of the Anheuser-Busch InBev Group. Currently, Belgian Beer Cafés can be found in 50 cities spread out over 19 countries.

== History ==
The Belgian Beer Café concept pairs Belgian beers with Belgian cuisine. The Cafés were designed by Creneau International, inspired by the look of Belgian Cafés during the interbellum and incorporating many elements of Belgian Art Nouveau architect Victor Horta.

Belgian Beer Cafés come in two slightly different concepts: rural and cosmopolitan. The rural version imitates the typical Belgian brasserie, which is rather spacious with a large amount of seating and a good view of the comings and goings. The cosmopolitan-orientated Cafés are furnished in a more efficient way, less roomy and are targeted to a different audience.

At first, the beer menu was limited to only original InBev brands but over the years the number of participating breweries has grown.

At the World Expo 2010 in Shanghai, China, a complete Belgian Beer Café was constructed in the Belgian EU pavilion, drawing some 110,000 visitors.

The Belgian Beer Cafés were also represented in 2011 at the Cleveland Wine Festival. During the festival, a Belgian Beer Café served Stella Artois (premium lager), Hoegaarden (white wheat beer) and Leffe (abbey beer).

== International expansion ==
As of 2011, Belgian Beer Café locations can be found in 51 cities spread out over 20 countries and 4 continents (Europe, Asia, North America and Australia). Most of the cafes are located in city centres, but the Cafés can also be found in hotels and at international airports.

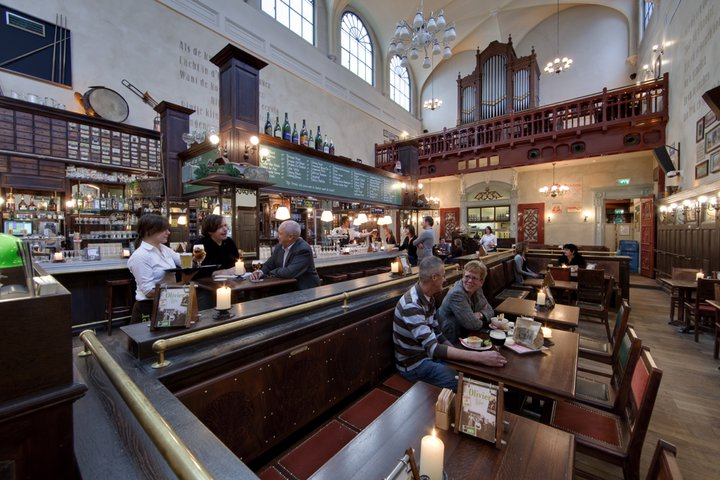
Utrecht

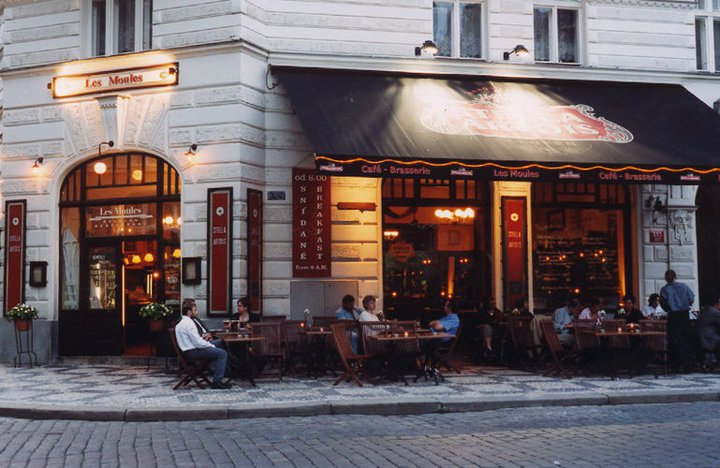
Prague

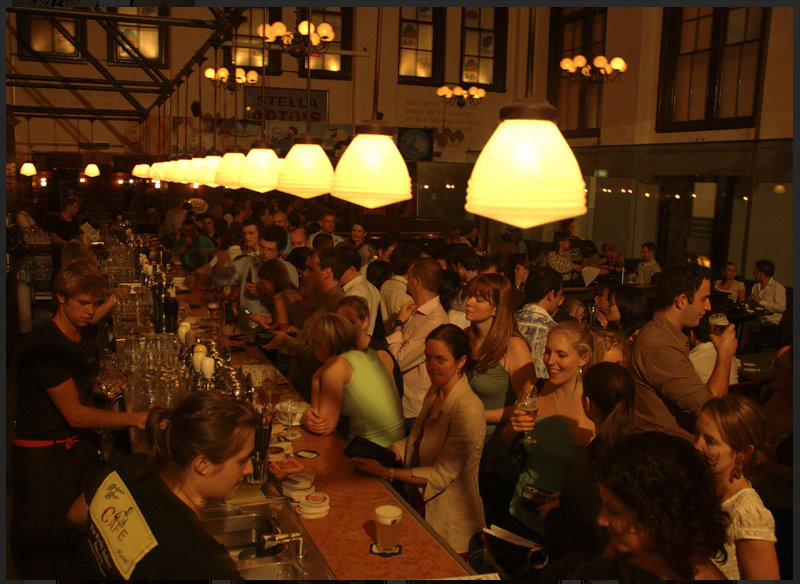
Sydney
