= Brasserie de Silly =

Brewery in Silly, Belgium

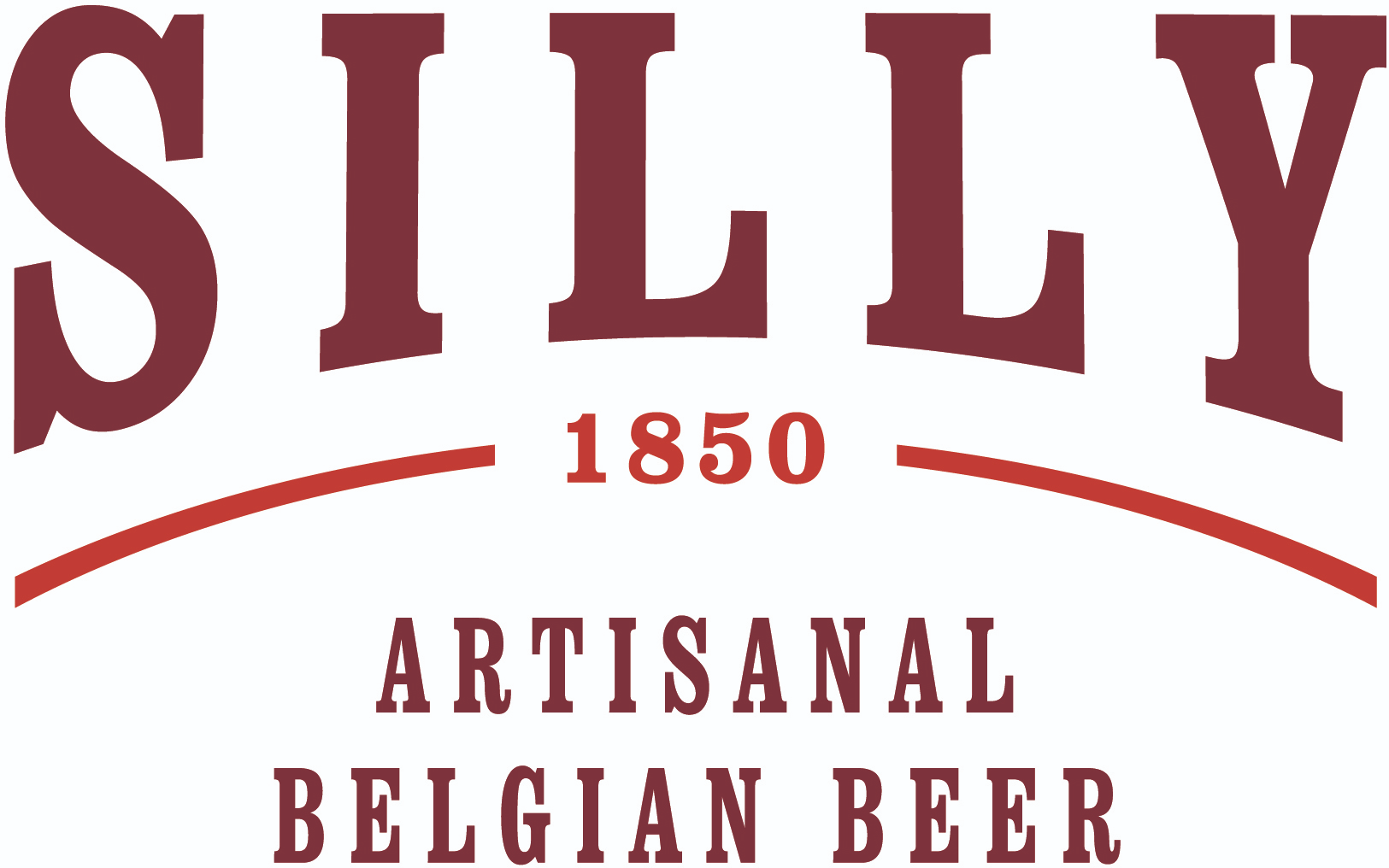
- Industry: Alcoholic beverage
- Founded: 1850
- Headquarters: Silly, Belgium
- Products: Beer
- Website: Brasserie de Silly

Brasserie de Silly is a brewery located in the town of Silly (Belgium). The brewery was founded in 1850. The brewery was founded in 1850 in a farm called the Cense de la Tour. It was then called the Meynsbrughen brewery.

== List of beers ==
- La Divine : a blond abbey style beer, 9.5% ABV
- Double Enghien Blonde : a strong blond beer, 7.5% ABV
- Double Enghien Brune : a strong amber beer, 8.0% ABV
- Enghien Noel : a Christmas beer, 9.0% ABV
- Pink Killer : a grapefruit beer, 5.0% ABV
- Abbaye de Forest : a blond triple ale, 6.5% ABV
- Saison Silly : a saison beer, 5.0% ABV
- Scotch Silly : a dark scotch style beer, 7.5% ABV
- Silly Pils : a pils beer, 5.0% ABV
- Super 64 : an amber beer, 5.0% ABV
- Titje : a white beer, 5.0% ABV

This list is not all-inclusive as the Brasserie de Silly makes a number of other beers. Some of them are seasonal varieties while others come and go depending on sales.
