= Roman Brewery =

Brewery in Belgium

- Native name: Brouwerij Roman
- Industry: Brewery
- Founded: Mater, Belgium (1545)
- Founder: Joos Roman
- Headquarters: Mater, Belgium
- Products: Beer

The Roman Brewery (Dutch: Brouwerij Roman) is a beer brewery in Mater, Belgium, in operation since 1545. The brewery has been family-owned since the late sixteenth century; Joos Roman, a bailli until 1604, is considered the pater familias. Unlike many Breweries in the region, which make Belgian style sour beers, the Brouwerij Roman has maintained beers of more German and French styles.

Besides beers, the company also produces soft drinks.

== See also ==
- List of oldest companies
