= Slaghmuylder Brewery =

Brewery in Ninove, Belgium

The Slaghmuylder Brewery is a small brewery in Ninove, Belgium. It was founded in 1860 and is still run by the same family.

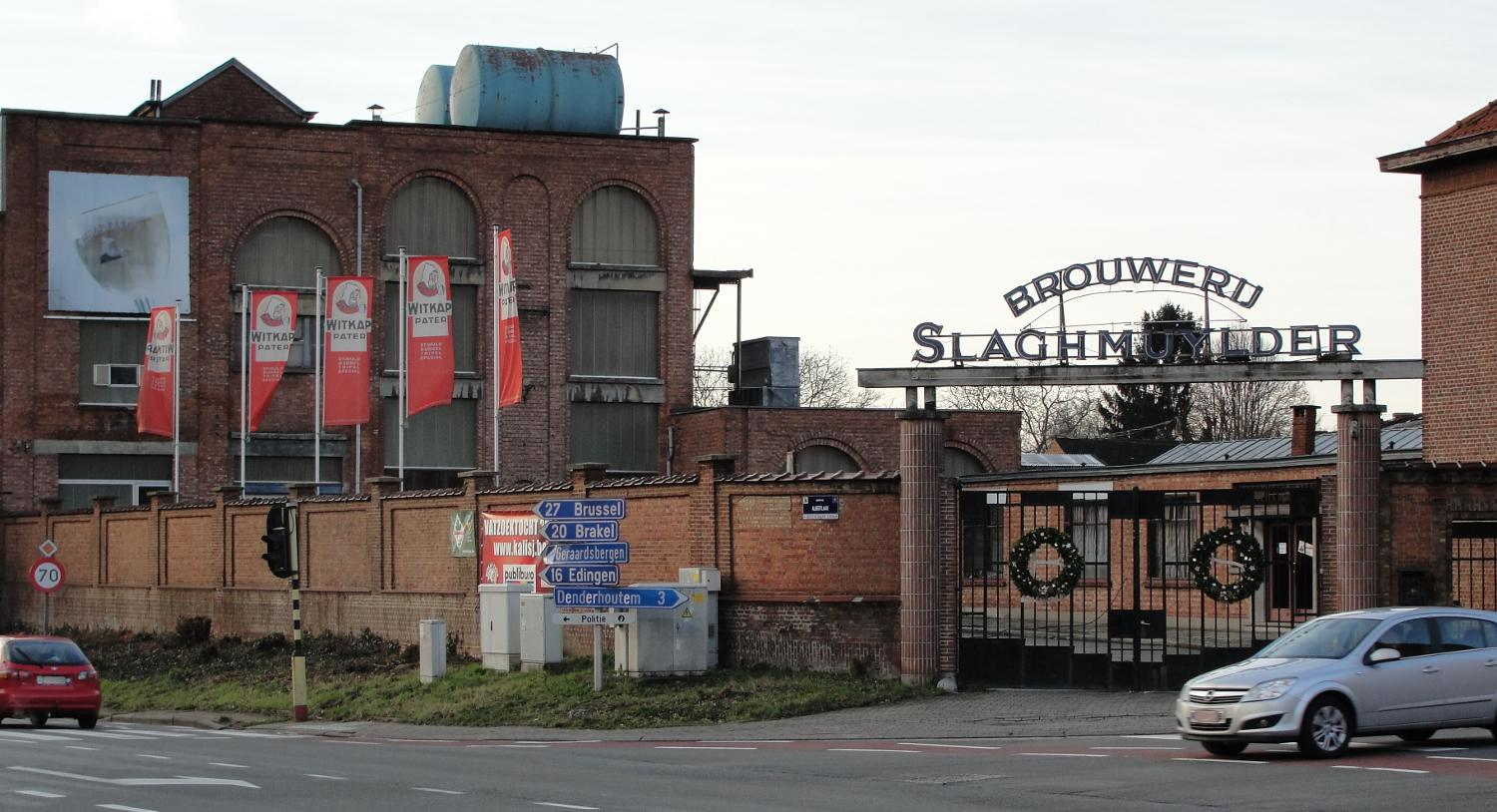
Slaghmuylder Brewery

The brewery is notable also for having brewed one of the first of the modern tripels, a type of strong, golden pale ale. According to beer historian Michael Jackson, the first such beer was brewed in 1931 by Hendrik Verlinden, who was a brewer at the nearby Drie Linden Brewery and regularly assisted the monks of the Trappist Westmalle Brewery; in 1932, then working for Slaghmuylder, produced the tripel first called Witkap Pater, now known as Witkap Tripel. Their tripel is still praised as one of the best available.

Besides the Witkap singles, doubles, and tripels, the company also brews seasonal and occasional beers. In 2009, Cornel was brewed for carnival celebrations, and in 2010 Gouden Wortel was brewed to celebrate the brewery's 150th anniversary. Their beers are exported to the United States and since 2009 also to Japan.

== Products ==
- Witkap Pater Stimulo, a single with 6% ABV
- Witkap Pater Dubbel, a double with 7% ABV
- Witkap Pater Tripel, a tripel with 7.5% ABV
- Witkap Pater Special, a soft amber with 5.5% ABV (originally known as the "Greut Lawautj")
- Paasbier, a seasonal pilsner served around Easter with 6% ABV
