= St. Bernardus Brewery =

Brewery in Belgium

Sint Bernardus Brouwerij
- Industry: Brewing
- Founded: 1946
- Headquarters: Watou, Belgium
- Products: Beer
- Website: www.sintbernardus.be

St. Bernardus is a brewery in Watou, Belgium.

== History ==
In the late 19th century anti-clericalism in France forced the Catsberg Abbey Community to move to the village of Watou in West Flanders, Belgium. The Refuge Notre Dame de St. Bernard was established, originally producing cheese to finance abbey activities. In 1934, it was decided to close the Belgian annex and return all monastic activities to France with Evarist Deconinck taking over the cheese factory.

In 1945, Trappist monastery St. Sixtus stopped selling its beer and an agreement was reached where the monks would brew beer for themselves and the beer could only be bought at the monastery and associated taverns. They gave a license to the cheese factory, and Brewery St. Bernard was founded. The brew master from Westvleteren, Mathieu Szafranski (from Polish origin) became a partner in the brewery and brought along the recipes, the know-how and the St. Sixtus yeast strain. Deconinck brewed and sold the Trappist beers under license before a new contract was agreed in 1962. The agreement ended in 1992 with the Trappist monasteries deciding that Trappist beer could only be brewed in a monastery. Since 1992 the beers brewed in Watou have been sold under the brand name St. Bernardus.

The St. Bernardus range is considered a close match in recipe and style to the St. Sixtus beers, which can be hard to obtain outside the area.

== Beers ==
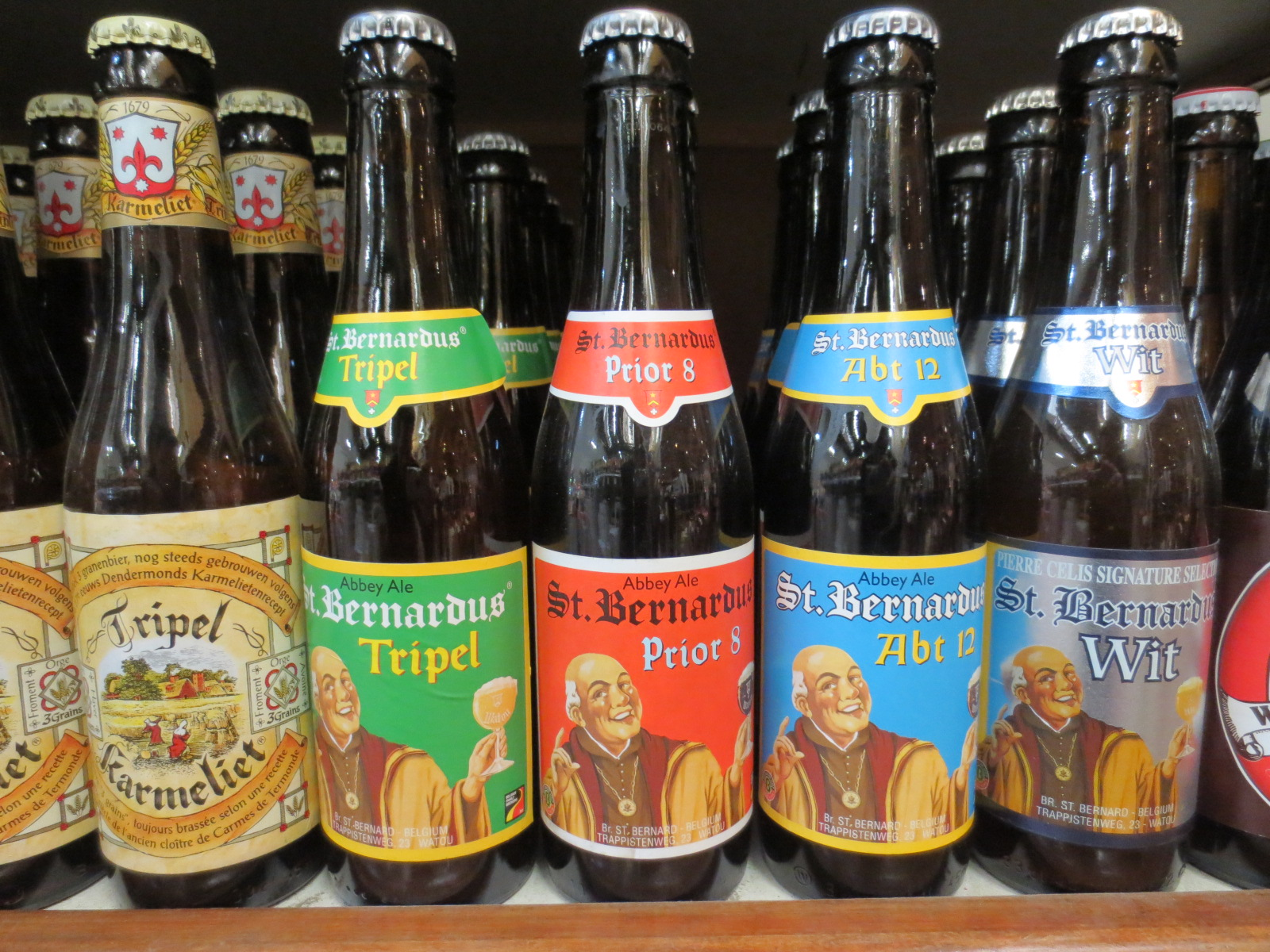
St. Bernardus beer

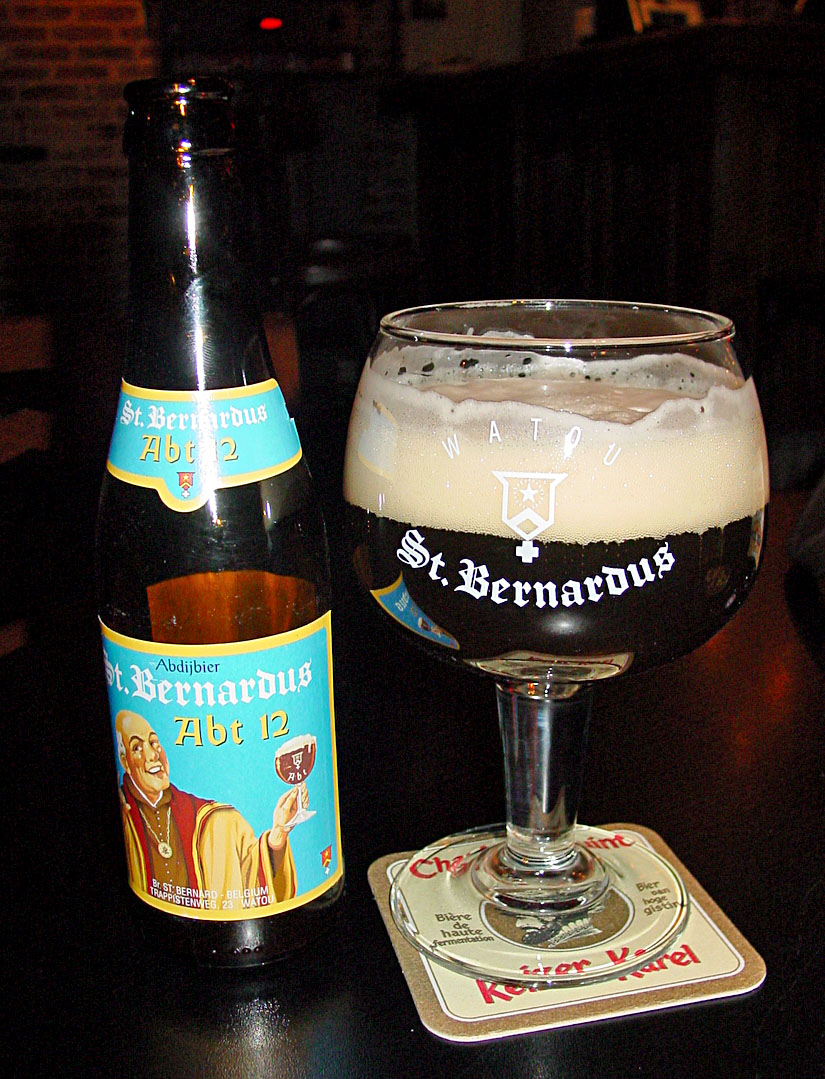
St. Bernardus Abt 12

Seven beers are sold under the St. Bernardus label:

- St. Bernardus Tripel (8% ABV)
- St. Bernardus Extra 4 (4.8% ABV)
- St. Bernardus Pater 6 (6.7% ABV)
- St. Bernardus Prior 8 (8% ABV)
- St. Bernardus Abt 12 (10.0% ABV)
- St. Bernardus Witbier (5.5% ABV) this beer was created in collaboration with beer brewer Pierre Celis
- Watou Tripel - Belgian Tripel (7.5% ABV)
- St. Bernardus Tokyo (6% ABV)
- St. Bernardus Christmas Ale (10% ABV); only available during the winter

Previously sold under the St. Bernardus label:

- Grottenbier - Belgian Dark Ale (6.5% ABV); . Its name means 'cave beer', because the beer matures in a cave for two months. Sold from 2001 until 2014, now sold under the name "Grotten Santé" by Brewery Kazematten
