= Brasserie du Bocq =

Brewery in Belgium

Coordinates: 50.3112°N 4.9436°E

Brasserie Du Bocq
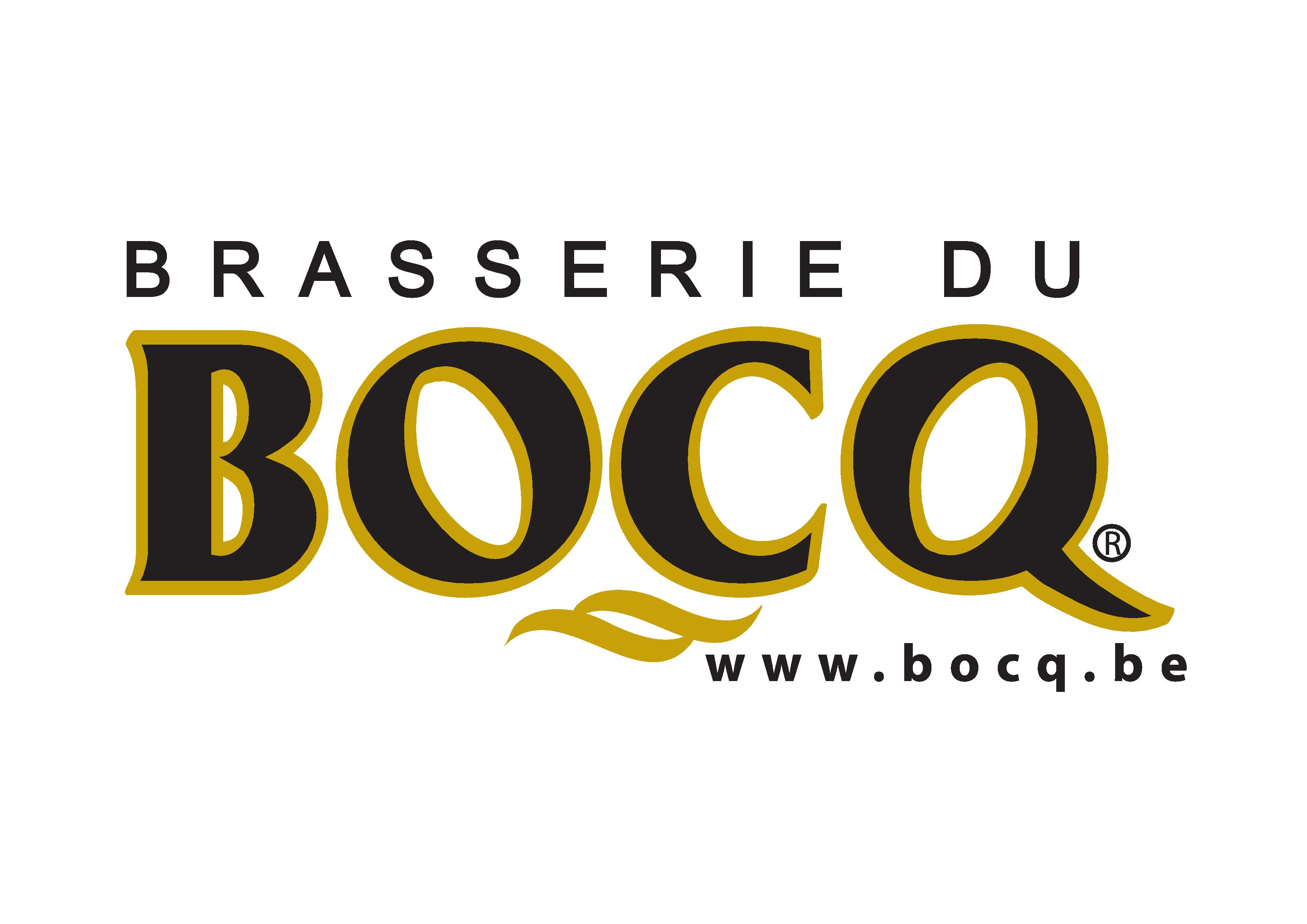
- Industry: Alcoholic beverage
- Founded: 1858
- Headquarters: Purnode, Belgium
- Products: Beer
- Production output: 6,000,000 L

The Brasserie du Bocq is a Belgian family brewery founded in 1858 by Martin Belot. It is based in the valley of the small river Bocq in Purnode (near Yvoir).

== History ==
In the beginning, the brewery was just used in the winter, when the workers in the farm had less to do. After the World War I, the beer La Gauloise was first brewed and gained immediate success. The brewery became a PLC in 1949. All the farm activities and the door-to-door deliveries were stopped in 1960. Seven years later, it took over the Brasserie centrale from Marbaix-la-Tour and subsequently added two beers to its range of products: Saison Régal and Régal Christmas. The brewery in Marbaix-la-Tour was closed in 1983 in order to restructure the company. Until 2003 the Belot family managed the brewery, but the number of family shareholders in the sixth generation had become too numerous. They then entrusted Francis Deraedt with the management of the company.

== Beers ==
- Applebocq (3.1% ABV), with a light taste of apple.
- Redbocq (3.4% ABV)
- Gauloise Blonde (6.3% ABV)
- Gauloise Brune (8.1% ABV)
- Gauloise Double 6 (6,5% ABV)
- Gauloise Ambrée (5.5% ABV)
- Gauloise Fruits Rouges (8.2% ABV)
- Gauloise Triple Blonde 10 (9.7% ABV)
- Gauloise Christmas (8.1% ABV)
- Saint-Benoît Blonde (6.3% ABV)
- Saint-Benoît Brune (6.5% ABV)
- Blanche de Namur (4.5% ABV), a witbier
- Blanche de Namur Apple (3.1% ABV)
- Blanche de Namur Rosée (3.4% ABV)
- Saison Régal (5.5% ABV)
- Saison 1858 (6.4% ABV)
- Triple Moine (7.3% ABV)
- Deugniet (7.3% ABV), with a light taste of apple
- Régal Christmas (8.1% ABV), a dark brown beer
