= Cuisine of Brussels =

Culinary traditions of Brussels, Belgium

Brussels cuisine is a regional form of Belgian cuisine known for specialities such as waffles, chocolate, French fries and a wide variety of beers. The Brussels sprout, long popular in the region and possibly originating there, also takes its name from the city.

The city’s gastronomy reflects both traditional Belgian fare and its cosmopolitan character, with nearly every national cuisine represented among its approximately 1,800 restaurants, including several Michelin-starred establishments. Notable dishes include moules-frites (mussels with fries), pralines first created by Jean Neuhaus II in 1912, and the spontaneously fermented lambic beers brewed in and around the Senne Valley and Pajottenland. Brussels is also recognised as the birthplace of the Belgian endive, developed in the mid-19th century at the city’s Botanical Garden.

== History ==
The earliest known collection of recipes published in Brussels appeared around 1508 or 1514, issued by the printer Thomas van der Noot under the title Een notabel boecxken van cokeryen . Written in Flemish, the unsigned manuscript is generally attributed to van der Noot himself and includes recipes featuring spices, sweet and savoury contrasts, and chicken dishes. A second cookbook, Eenen nyeuwen coock boeck, authored by the physician Geeraert Vorselman, was published in Antwerp around 1560. This was followed in 1612 by Koocboec oft familieren keukenboec, printed in Leuven by Joannes Christophorus Flavius and signed by Anthonius Magirus (from the Greek mageiros, “cook”), a name thought to be the pseudonym of the Antwerp satirical poet Petrus Scholiers.

From the early 19th century, Brussels saw the emergence of modern restaurants, influenced by developments in Paris. These establishments offered private tables, a refined dining experience, and a meeting place for the city’s economic, political, and cultural elites. Initially concentrated around the Rue des Bouchers/Beenhouwersstraat and Place Royale/Koningsplein, the restaurant scene expanded in the late 19th century with the development of central boulevards, creating a new culinary district between the Place de la Bourse/Beursplein and Brussels-North railway station.

Over the centuries, Brussels cuisine developed both shared Belgian traditions and regional variations. Historically, meals often began with hors d’œuvres and ended with elaborate pastries, and family or festive dining played a central role in culinary life. Household and technological changes, as well as the internationalisation of the restaurant scene, influenced food practices, alongside the continued appreciation of seasonal and local products. Typical Brussels dishes reflect both Flemish and Walloon influences and include specialties such as ballekes à la marolienne, choesels, and caricoles.

== List of foods ==
Name	Image	Description
Américain préparé		Américain préparé or filet américain is a steak tartare, made from finely minced raw beef mixed with egg yolk, parsley, onions, capers, pickles, mustard, Worcestershire sauce, mayonnaise, salt, and pepper. It is traditionally served with fries and is often prepared fresh in restaurants, though it can also be eaten as a spread or in a sandwich. The dish was created in the early 20th century by Joseph Niels and is a popular local specialty.
Anguille à la bruxelloise		Anguille à la bruxelloise is the local variation of paling in ’t groen, consisting of eel cooked in a green herb sauce. In this local variation, gueuze replaces the usual white wine.
Ballekes au lambic		Ballekes au lambic is a dish of meatballs served in a lambic sauce with braised chicory. The meatballs, made from a mix of ground beef, chicken, and pork, are complemented by the slightly tart and bitter flavour of the lambic sauce. The dish is popular across both Flemish- and French-speaking regions of Belgium.
Baulus		The baulus, also known as bolus, is a brioche shaped into a spiral and studded with Corinthian raisins.
Bloempanch		Bloempanch, is a sausage made by stuffing a cow’s stomach with a mixture of ingredients, forming a large sausage about 15 cm in diameter. Historically considered the “steak of the poor,” it is characterised by large cubes of pure white fat.
Bodding		Bodding is a dessert made from stale bread, eggs, and milk, transforming leftover bread into a sweet pudding. The name combines the Flemish word brood (lit. 'bread') with the English pudding, and the dish dates back to the Middle Ages, offering a comforting treat popular during colder seasons.
Brussels waffle		Brussels waffles are made with an egg-white- or yeast-leavened batter, sometimes combining both. They are lighter, crispier, and have larger pockets than other, and are typically rectangular, distinguishing them from Liège waffles. Traditionally served warm by street vendors with confectioner's sugar, they may also be topped with whipped cream, fruit, or chocolate in tourist areas.
Brussels cheese		Brussels cheese, is a cheese, known in. Made from low-fat cow’s milk, it is matured for two to four months, washed with salty water, and brined. The cheese is firm, salty, and tangy, with a distinctive meaty aroma that once earned it a nickname linked to Brussels’ small neighbourhood cinemas.
Carbonade à la bruxelloise		Carbonade à la bruxelloise is the local variation of the Flemish stew, consisting of beef or pork and onions braised in a sauce made with gueuze. Typically served with fries, boiled potatoes, or stoemp.
Caricole		Caricole, are periwinkles traditionally sold by street vendors. Sometimes the name is also used for whelks, though this is a later usage and not part of the original tradition.
Carpe à la bruxelloise		Carpe à la bruxelloise is a dish of carp cooked in a sauce made with lambic and red wine, thickened with gingerbread.
Choesels		Choesels is a dish from the late 19th century, consisting of veal sweetbreads simmered in a sauce made with gueuze. The dish is labor-intensive, often taking nearly a full day to prepare, and was once highly popular, though it is less commonly served today despite being mentioned by Escoffier in Le Guide Culinaire.
Karabitjes		Karabitjes are tiny biscuits that were historically given as prizes at fairs, often sticking to parchment paper.
Kletskop		Kletskop or pain d’amandes is a thin biscuit studded with small pieces of almonds.
Klippel		Klippel is a fairground biscuit, sold by chance through dice games where players received one or two biscuits depending on the roll.
Kuddel		Kuddel, also known as knoddel or kneudel, is a dish of dough dumplings boiled until puffed and served hot with melted butter. They are sometimes made with raisins or Corinthian raisins mixed in.
Labbaybrood		Labbaybrood (lit. 'gossiper’s bread'), is a coarse bun historically eaten during gatherings where women spun, sewed, or knitted while chatting.
Lapin à la bruxelloise		Lapin à la bruxelloise, is a dish of rabbit stewed with gueuze and prunes. The flavor varies depending on the type of gueuze used, and it is typically served with fries or parsleyed boiled potatoes. The dish is often paired with regional beers such as gueuze, kriek, or framboise.
Meulemeester eggs		Meulemeester eggs is a dish of hard-boiled eggs and grey shrimp prepared in a beer sabayon with mustard, parsley, and Gruyère cheese. The dish was created in the early 20th century for the theatre performance Le Mariage de mademoiselle Beulemans.
Moules parquées		Moules parquées is a dish consisting of raw mussels served on the half-shell. They are typically accompanied by a simple sauce of lemon juice, mustard, and black pepper, sometimes with a touch of vinegar. Often eaten with a glass of white wine.
Mitraillette		The mitraillette is a fast-food specialty, consisting of a baguette filled with fries, fried meat, and a sauce of choice. It is typically served with mayonnaise but can include other sauces and sometimes vegetables such as tomato slices or grated carrots. The dish is considered a quintessential example of Brussels' casual street food.
Omelette à la bruxelloise		Omelette à la bruxelloise is a omelette filled with braised, finely chopped endives bound in cream and served with a border of cream sauce.
Pain à la grecque		Pain à la grecque is a sweet, cinnamon- and brown sugar-coated bread. Its name, meaning "Greek bread," resulted from a mistranslation by French soldiers, who rendered the original local name Brood van de Gracht (lit. 'Bread from the Canal') too literally. Traditionally found in Brussels bakeries, it is especially associated with the Maison Dandoy, which has been producing it near the Grand-Place for over 150 years.
Pistolet		The pistolet is a small bread roll, often filled with minced pork and pickles. The name may derive from Latin terms referring to bread kneaded in oil (panis pistus in oleo) or milk (pistus in lacte), or from the historical practice of selling small round rolls for the price of a pistole.
Podoemmeke		Podoemmeke is a small bread, dark in colour and studded with Corinthian raisins and sometimes nuts. The name may derive from the Brussels dialect expletive podferdoeme, itself a softened form of godverdomme (lit. 'goddammit').
Pottekeis		Pottekeis is a preparation made by mixing the pungent Brussels cheese with mandjeskaas, a soft cottage-style cheese traditionally sold fresh in small wicker baskets. The blend is combined with shallots, spring onions, and a splash of gueuze, creating a spread that is both sharply acidic and notably salty. Today, mandjeskaas has all but disappeared, and cream cheese is often used as a substitute in modern versions.
Poularde de Bruxelles		Poularde de Bruxelles is a dish made with the Malines chicken. The birds are fed for three months on a buckwheat and whey porridge and are typically served roasted with raw-sautéed Belgian endives, Brussels sprout leaves, and truffled purée, or cooked in Blanche de Namur. The endives are sliced and sautéed in butter, while the sprouts are briefly boiled and finished with melted butter, making a rich, local specialty.
Poulet à la bruxelloise		Poulet à la bruxelloise is a dish featuring chicken cooked with endives. The bird is typically stuffed with its liver and aromatics, then braised with the endives, butter, and seasoning, sometimes finished with a touch of cream.
Praline		A praline, also known as Belgian chocolate or chocolate bonbon, is a chocolate shell filled with a soft centre, typically made with high-quality Belgian chocolate. Although filled chocolates existed in the 19th century, they were popularized in 1912 by chocolatier Jean Neuhaus II.
Speculoos		Speculoos is typically flat, crisp, and moulded with traditional images, flavoured with a mix of spices such as cinnamon, nutmeg, clove, ginger, cardamom, and pepper, which vary regionally. Historically associated with Saint Nicholas Day, weddings, and fairs, speculoos are now eaten year-round, often with coffee, tea, or ice cream, while almond-filled varieties and thicker chunks remain seasonal specialties.
Stoemp		Stoemp is a traditional dish of mashed potatoes combined with local vegetables such as Brussels sprouts, leeks, carrots, or chicory. It is commonly served with pork products like sausage, black pudding, or bacon, or with a fried egg, and recipes vary across households in the city.
Stoemp saucisse		Stoemp saucisse is a dish consisting of stoemp, served with a sausage.
Zenne Pot		Zenne Pot is a dish invented by Dirk Myny, combining bloempanch, dry sausage, whelks, cabbage, cooked in gueuze.

== See also ==
- Belgian cuisine
