= De bedenkers =

Belgian television show

- Presented by: Bart Peeters; Sofie Van Moll
- Judges: Series 1 Axel Enthoven; Marc Coucke; Els Raemdonck; Series 2 Axel Enthoven; Saskia Schatteman; Guillaume Van der Stighelen
- Country of origin: Belgium
- Original language: Dutch
- No. of series: 2

Original release
- Network: één
- Release: September 9, 2007 – January 19, 2009

De bedenkers was a Belgian television show aired on één that pitted inventors against each other for €25,000 in prize money and a chance to release their product into the market. The show ran two series and was presented by Bart Peeters and Sofie Van Moll. The show was financially supported in part by the Flemish government.

== Format ==
Around 2,000 people applied to the show each year and 100 were chosen to participate. There was a wide range of age, with the first series having contestants between 11 and 83 years old. 75 inventors were eliminated in the 6th episode and the remaining 25 were split into 5 groups of 5 to compete in the semi-finals. The inventors were given 6 months to continue developing their project. One finalist from each of the 5 groups (4 in the second series) was chosen by the jury and the audience voted for the winner. This show was similar to Het Beste Idee van Nederland (The Best Idea in the Netherlands).

== Series 1 (2007) ==
Axel Enthoven, Marc Coucke, and Els Raemdonck served as the jury.

The five finalists in series 1 were:

- Safe ladder supports by Marc Missotten (from Limburg)
- "Stick It" multi-functional drink holder by Philippe Sciettecatte and Carl de Rooster
- "Slip Lift" to help those who cannot reach their feet put on underpants by Pierre Van den Broeck (from Antwerp)
- "Speculaas pasta" cookie butter spread by Els Scheppers (from Bornem)
- "Pression-X," children's clothing that with buttons that can be customized, by Joy Luts (from Antwerp)

In first place was Pierre Van den Broeck's Slip Lift, which helps those with mobility limitations put on underwear. In second place was Els Scheppers, who created a cookie butter made with Speculoos. Lotus approached Scheppers about her creation to create a Biscoff cookie spread and by 2009, it had made more than €10,000,000 on the market. Third place went to Stick It which was later distributed by Avdys. Fourth went to Missotten and was produced by Petry; last place was held by Pression-X, which was sold by JBC. Products that did not make it into the top 5 but went to market anyway were another cookie butter, Speculla, by Danny De Maeyer and Dirk De Smet and Place to Pee, a urinal with a built-in gaming console controlled by a urine stream.

Kris Peeters presented the winner with the prize.

== Series 2 (2008-2009) ==
The jury in series 2 was made up of Axel Enthoven, Saskia Schatteman, and Guillaume Van der Stighelen.

Four finalists were chosen in the second series:

- Anti-Whiplash System, a headrest that prevents whiplash, by Michaël Schotte (from Ypres)
- Close2, a bicycle wheel changing device, by Dirk Rosiers, Gaspar Cornette, and Nico Mattan (from Roeselare)
- Papiermaat (Paper Buddy) by Sonia Wyllinck (from Schoten)
- C'Rush, an ice crusher for cocktails, by Stefaan Eeckeloo, Floris Provoost, and Tim Verplanken (from Veldegem)

Sonia Wyllinck, inventor of the paper buddy, a tray that binds paper, was the winner and her product was produced by Euronyl. Runner-up was Michaël Schotte's whiplash prevention headrest and in third was Close2 by Dirk Rosiers, Gaspar Cornette, and Nico Mattan. The patent for Close2 was sold to the Hungarian company UBW. C'Rush by Stefaan Eeckeloo, Floris Provoost, and Tim Verplanken came in fourth.
