= Halles Saint-Géry =

Market hall and cultural centre in Brussels, Belgium

- Halles Saint-Géry (French); Sint-Gorikshallen (Dutch)
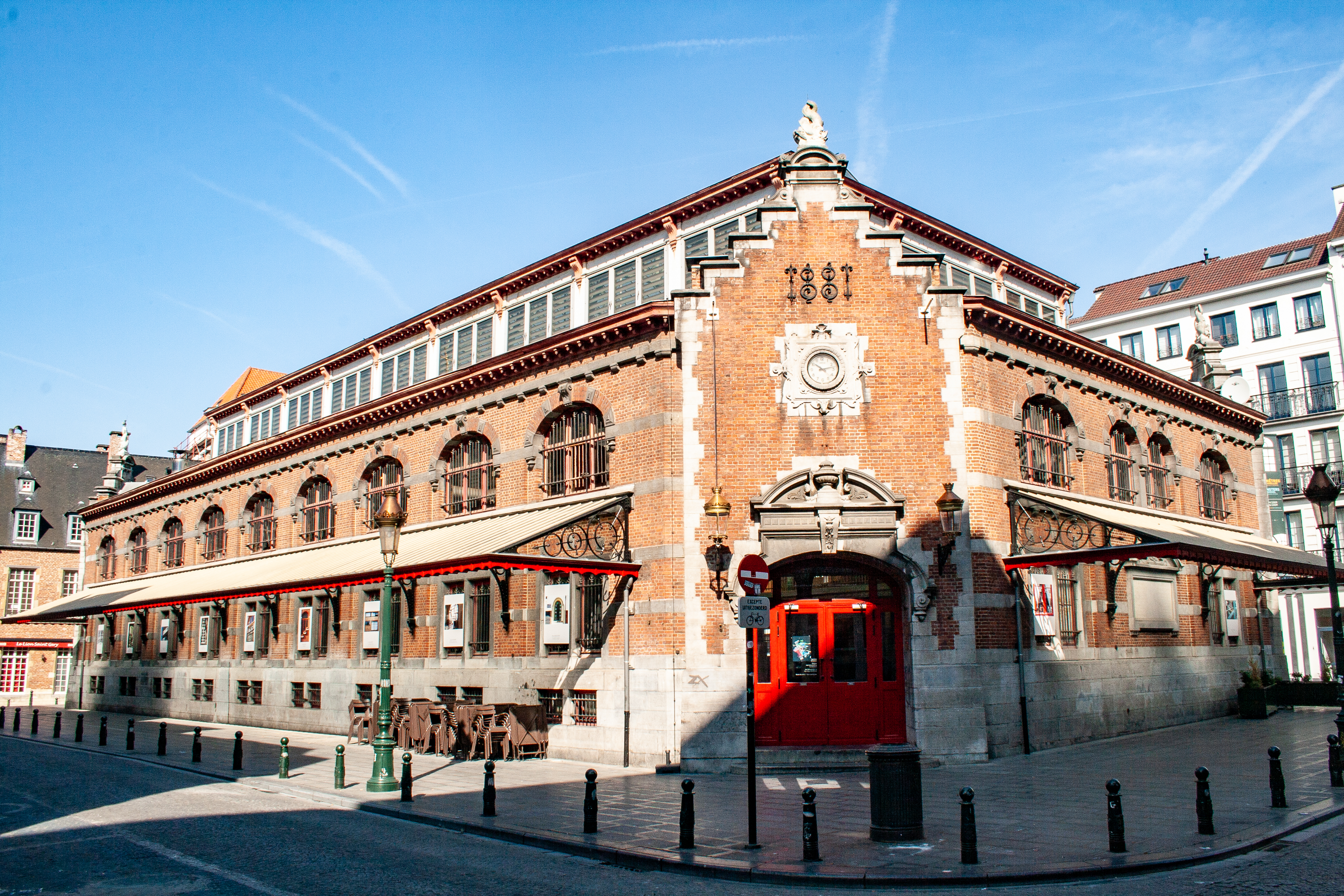
- Exterior of the Halles Saint-Géry
- Interactive map of Halles Saint-Géry
- Address: Place Saint-Géry / Sint-Goriksplein 1; 1000 City of Brussels, Brussels-Capital Region; Belgium
- Coordinates: 50°50′53″N 4°20′50″E
- Type: Market hall and cultural centre

Construction
- Groundbreaking: 1880
- Built: 1881
- Opened: 1882
- Renovated: 1987–1989
- Architect: Adolphe Vanderheggen

Website
- en.hallessaintgery.be

The Halles Saint-Géry (French) or Sint-Gorikshallen (Dutch) is a market hall, cultural centre and exhibition space in central Brussels, Belgium. It is located at 1, place Saint-Géry/Sint-Goriksplein, in a building designed by the architect Adolphe Vanderheggen in neo-Flemish Renaissance style and built in 1881–82. On the ground floor, there is a food market with around ten stallholders. Temporary exhibitions are held on the first floor.

The Saint-Géry area is well known for the many bars, cafés and restaurants in the vicinity, making it a popular nightspot in the capital.

== History ==
=== Origins: Saint-Géry Island ===
According to tradition, the origins of Brussels lie on Saint-Géry/Sint-Goriks Island, where a church once stood at the centre of the Senne's branches. The relics of Saint Gudula were housed there until their transfer in the 11th century to what later became the Cathedral of St. Michael and St. Gudula. The Gothic church was demolished between 1798 and 1801 under the French regime, and in 1802, an obelisk-shaped blue stone fountain from Grimbergen Abbey, dating from 1767, was placed on the new public square that replaced it. The square was an open-air market for the following century.

=== Market hall ===
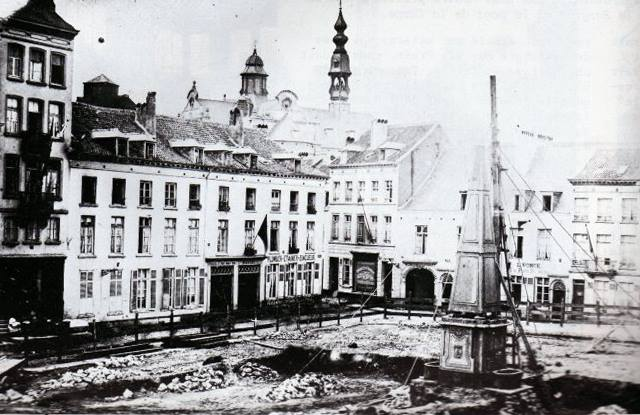
Construction of the Halles Saint-Géry/Sint-Gorikshallen, c. 1881

Around 1870, when the Senne was covered over, the island ceased to exist and some of its eastern sections were demolished to make way for the modern bourgeois housing on the newly constructed Boulevard Anspach/Anspachlaan (then called the Boulevard Central/Centraallaan). Plans were made to create a covered market to replace the open-air one. The building was commissioned in 1880 and construction began in 1881, as indicated by the year anchors on the corner façades. Designed by the architect Adolphe Vanderheggen in neo-Flemish Renaissance style, it was completed in 1882. Originally, the market hall was intended for the sale of meat and dairy products.

=== Closure, renovation and reassignment ===
The hall prospered until after the Second World War, but from 1973, it went into gradual decline following the establishment of a wholesale market on the Quai des Usines/Werkhuizenkaai. It was finally closed in 1977. After a period of abandonment, the building was classified as a protected monument in 1987. It was renovated between 1987 and 1989 under the direction of the architect J. Zajtman for the SA Saint-Géry, which restored its commercial function. In the following decades, it was definitively reassigned as a cultural and exhibition space.

Since 1999, the halls have housed an information and exhibition centre devoted to Brussels' heritage and identity. A new redevelopment project, led by Thierry Wauters and Lucile de Calan of the non-profit organisation Heritage and Culture, along with hospitality entrepreneur Cédric Gérard, aims to transform the ground floor into a covered food market once again. Inspired by the Marché des Enfants Rouges in Paris and the Markthal in Rotterdam, it features ten small-scale food and hospitality stands offering traditional Brussels specialities such as gueuze, Brussels cheese and Bloempanch. The initiative intends to reconnect the halls with their original function and to address the shortage of neighbourhood shops in the area. The opening took place on 16 June 2026, with a weekly outdoor market to follow. Exhibition activities will continue on the upper and lower floors, with extended opening hours and free public access.

== Architecture ==
=== Exterior ===
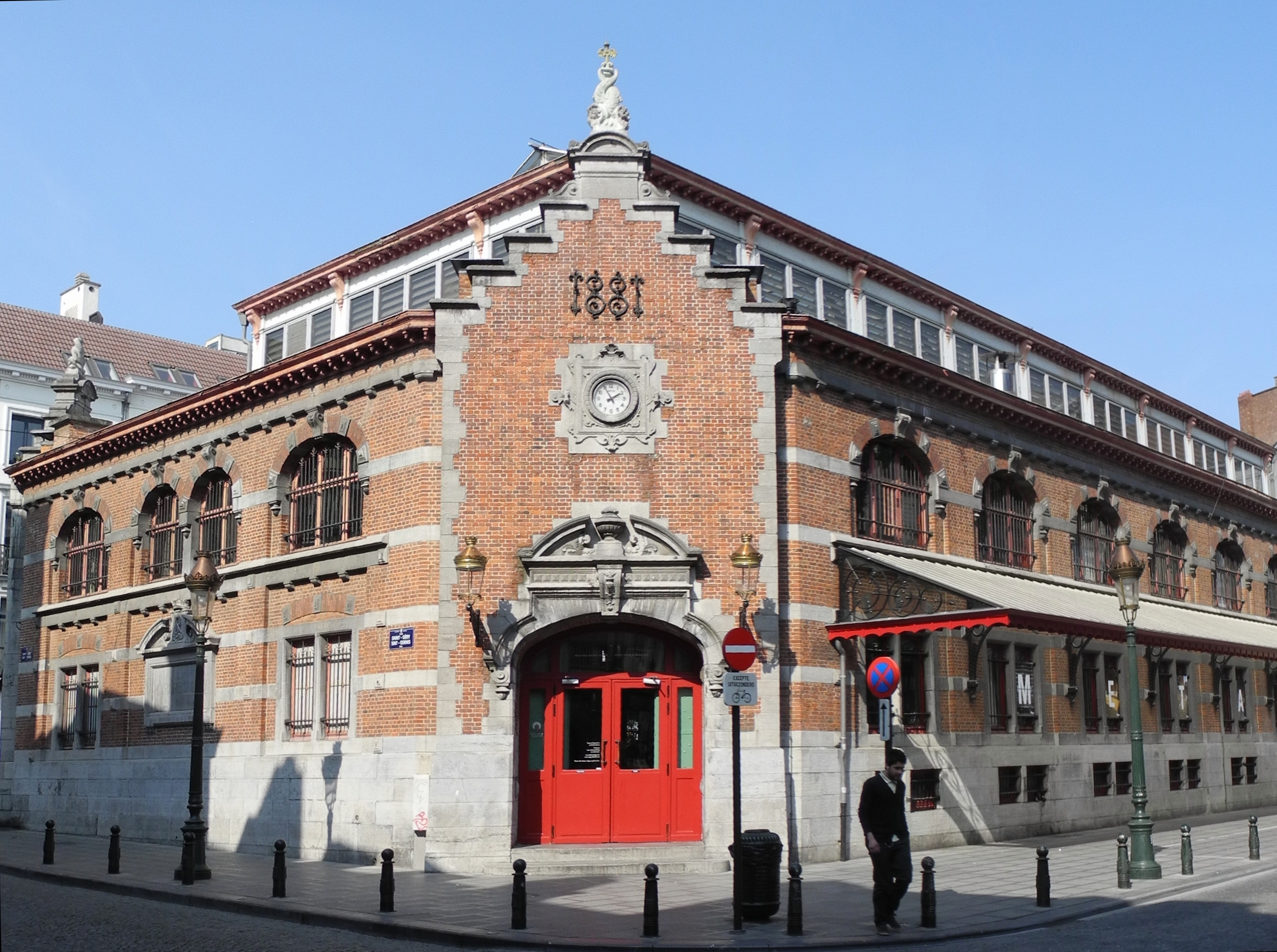
Main entrance

The market hall is a three-aisled covered structure on a rectangular plan with chamfered corners facing the surrounding streets. Designed in neo-Flemish Renaissance style, the metallic structure is an outstanding example of hall design, combining historicist elements with iron and glass construction. The façades are in brick with blue stone for the base and decorative details. Corner bays are stepped gables with arched pediments, while the main portals feature basket-handle arches with carved keystones and ornamental vases.

The long façades are divided into nine bays with grated twin windows below a restored glass-and-iron canopy. The upper storey has large round-arched windows beneath a frieze with dentils. The short façades bear plaques with the inscription "Marché Saint-Géry" and, since 1907, a reference to the former Gothic church. A raised glazed central section with a gabled glass roof provides light and ventilation.

=== Interior ===
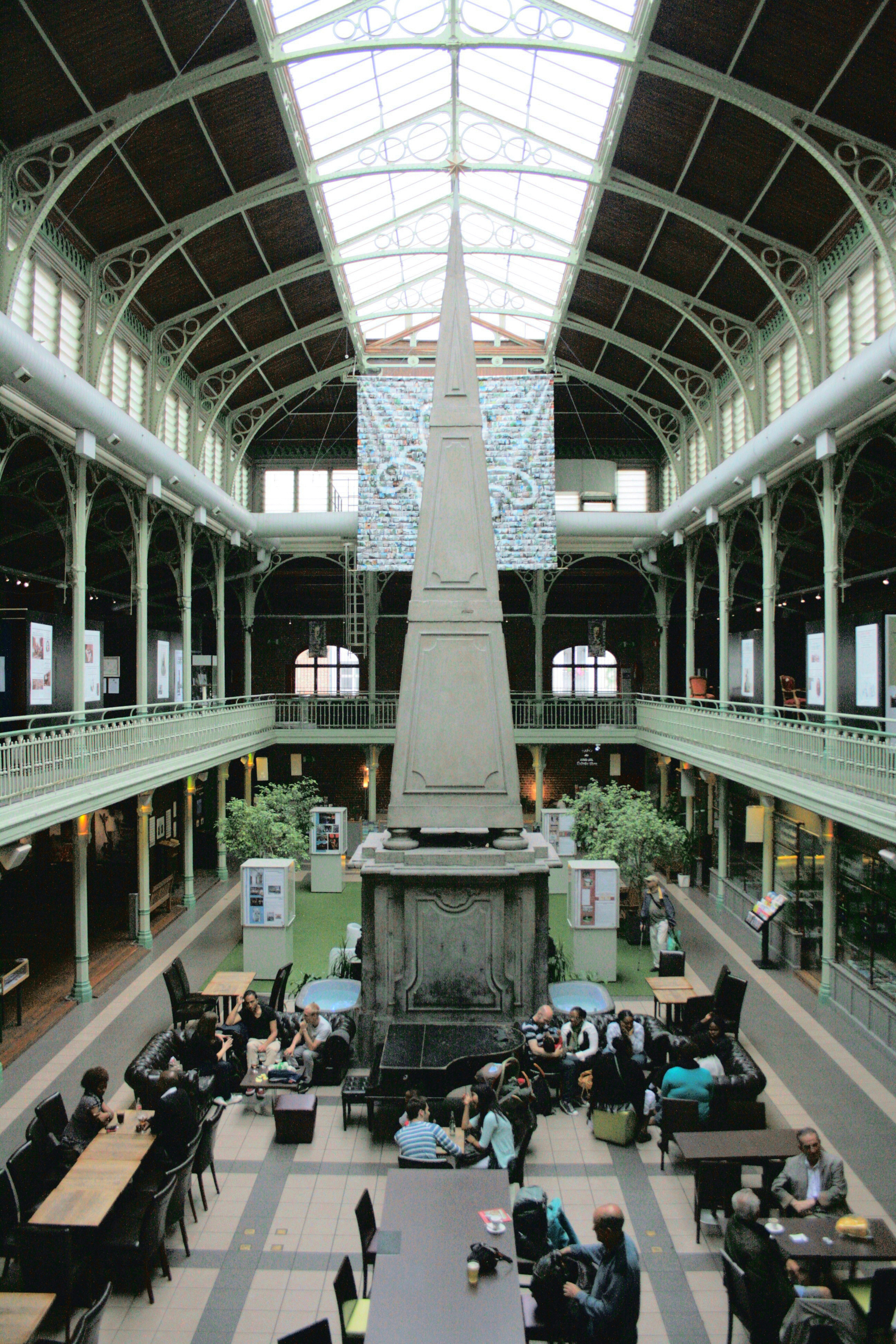
Interior with the blue stone fountain-obelisk

Inside, the hall is organised as a three-aisled structure with an iron portico of basket-handle arches on octagonal columns. Side aisles on the ground floor are vaulted, while the upper level forms galleries beneath arched trusses, accessed by staircases at the short ends.

At the centre stands the old fountain-obelisk from 1767. Originally surrounded by four rows of double blue stone stalls and counters, the space was reconfigured during renovation into an open atrium with shops and cafés around the galleries. The cellars are covered by groin vaults supported by square piers.

== See also ==
- History of Brussels
- Culture of Belgium
- Belgium in the long nineteenth century
