= Cookie butter =

Food paste made from speculoos cookie crumb

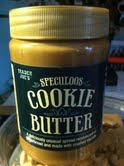
- Commercially available Speculoos cookie butter
- Main ingredients: Spice cookie, fat, and sugar
- Variations: Other crumbly cakes, additional ingredients (cocoa, liquor, coconut, oats, jams)

Cookie butter (Dutch: speculoospasta, Danish: trøffelmasse) is a food paste made primarily from speculoos cookie crumbs, fat (such as vegetable oil, condensed milk or butter), flour, and sugar. The ingredients are mixed until it becomes spreadable on a sandwich. In countries like Belgium, the Netherlands, and France, it is a common alternative to nut butter and chocolate spreads.

== History ==
The idea is generally attributed to Oma Wapsie, pseudonym of the Dutch Rita, who placed the recipe on her website in 2002.

The idea spread widely in part to a Belgian TV inventor show, called De Bedenkers ("The Inventors"). Two people presented a competing recipe to make a spreadable product out of Speculoos cookies: chef Danny De Maeyer who already filed a patent at that time, and Els Scheppers. Lotus, the biggest brand of Speculoos (known as Biscoff in the US) cookies, bought her idea and brought it to market. They also bought De Maeyer's patent in 2009, so as to seal the market.

On January 20, 2011, a court of commerce in Ghent, Belgium, denied the patent because the recipe had already been published on a Dutch website prior to its production.

Today, with the monopoly lifted, cookie butter is available under many brands, including Lotus Biscoff and Trader Joe's Speculoos Cookie Butter.

== In the United States ==
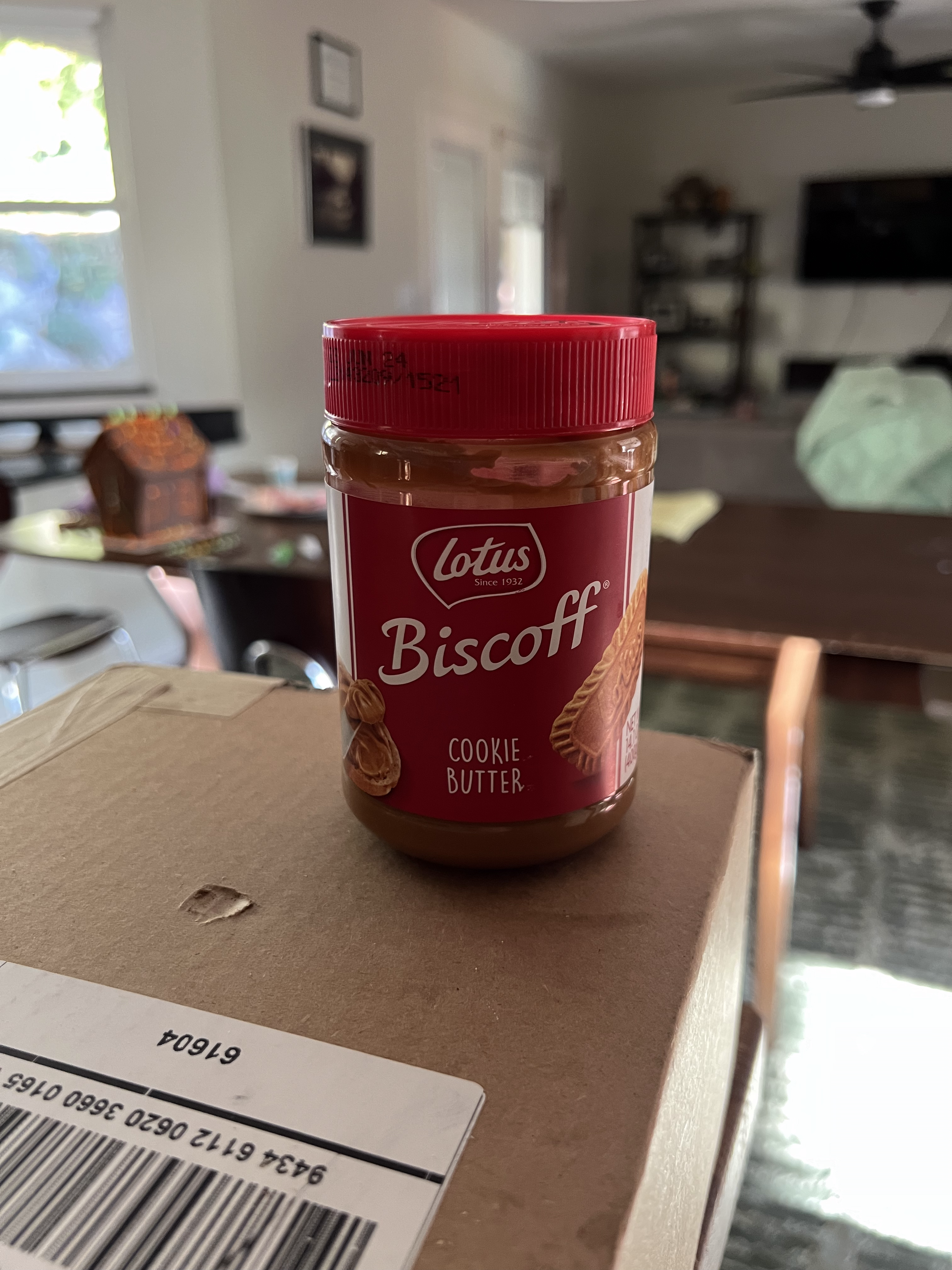
A photo of a jar of "Lotus Biscoff Cookie Butter".

The spread gained a cult following in the United States in 2015. It is often served during holidays. Lotus Biscoff Cookie Butter is the most recognizable brand. However, Trader Joe's Speculoos Cookie Butter is quite popular as well.

== Various types ==
In Scandinavia, a different kind of cookie butter has been used to make confectionery cakes for many years. It usually has a very thick consistency and is flavoured with cocoa and liquor.

In Sweden, cookie butter is the main ingredient in dammsugare (Punsch-rolls). The buttery paste is flavoured with cocoa and punsch, wrapped in a thin sheet of marzipan and dipped in dark chocolate. The marzipan is usually coloured brightly green.

In Denmark, cookie butter is known as trøffelmasse and is used for many traditional confectionery cakes such as studenterbrød, romkugler (known as trøfler in some parts of the country) and træstammer (a bit similar to the Swedish dammsugare) on sale in most bakeries. The cookie butter is mostly flavoured with cocoa and often includes other types of crumbled cakes. It is sometimes mixed with shredded coconut, rolled oats or jams. For the jam, apricot or raspberry is the preferred ingredient.

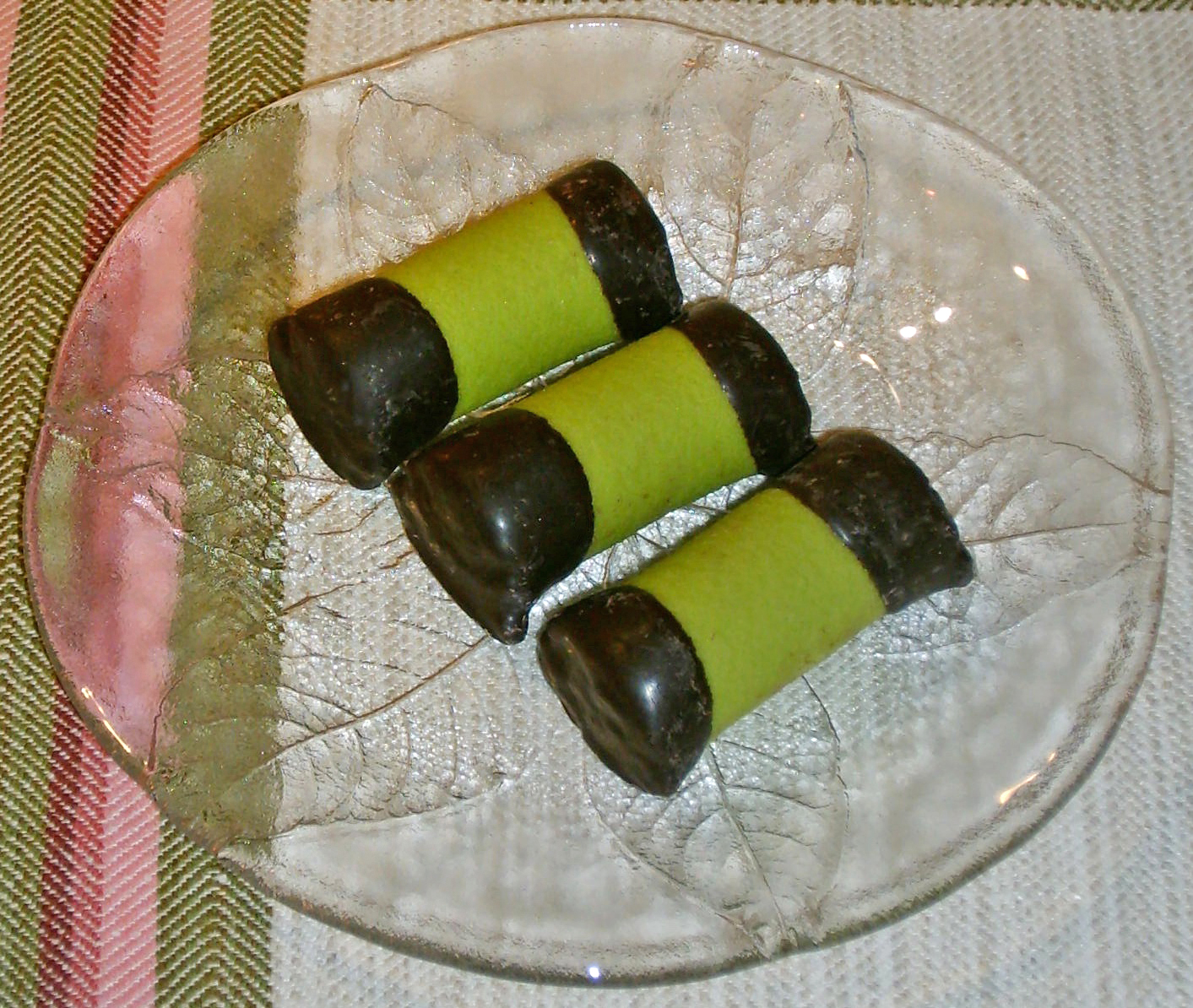
Dammsugare (Sweden). Cookie butter wrapped in brightly colored green marzipan and dipped in dark chocolate.

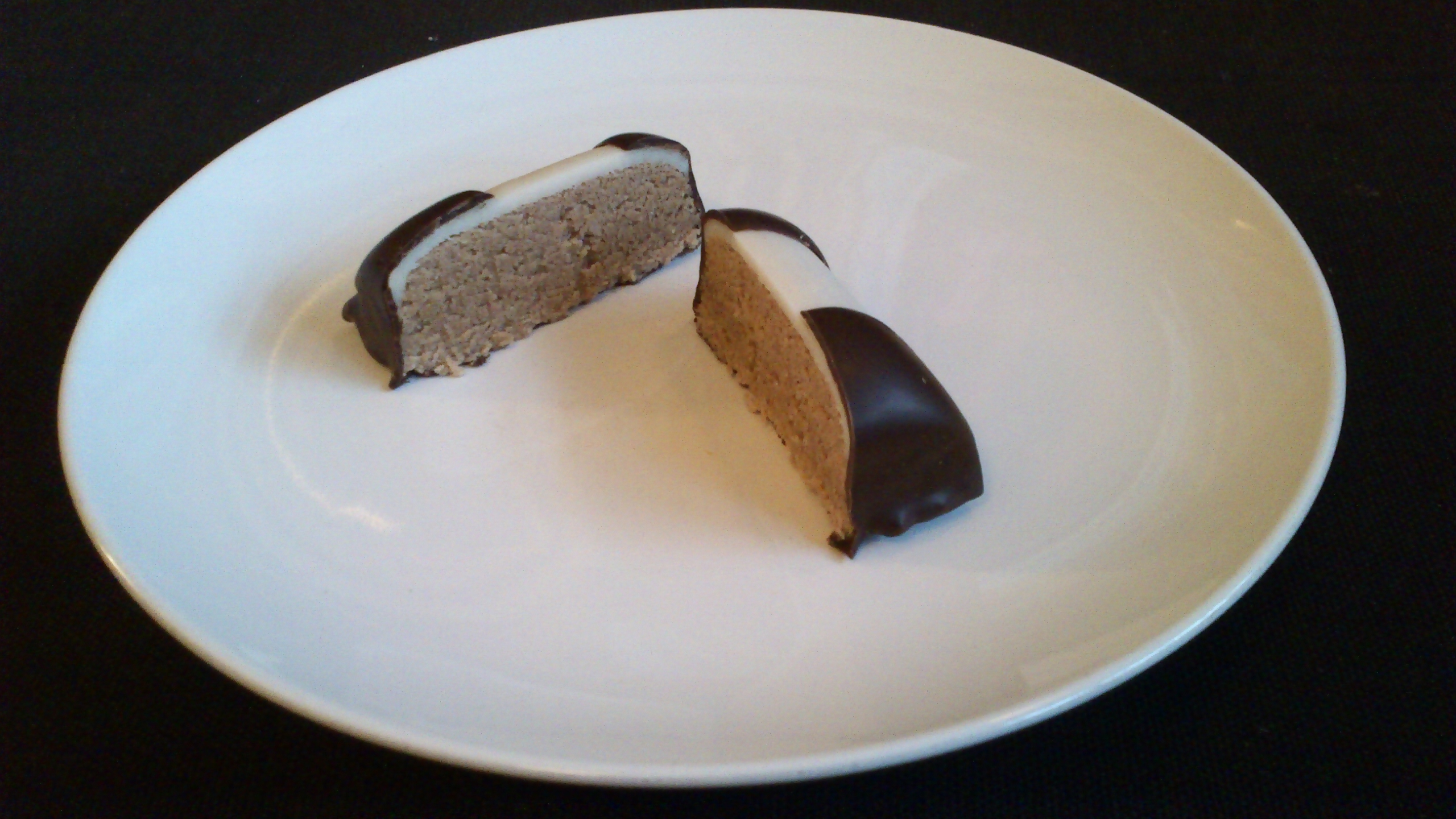
A divided træstamme (Denmark), exposing the cocoa and rum flavoured cookie butter interior.

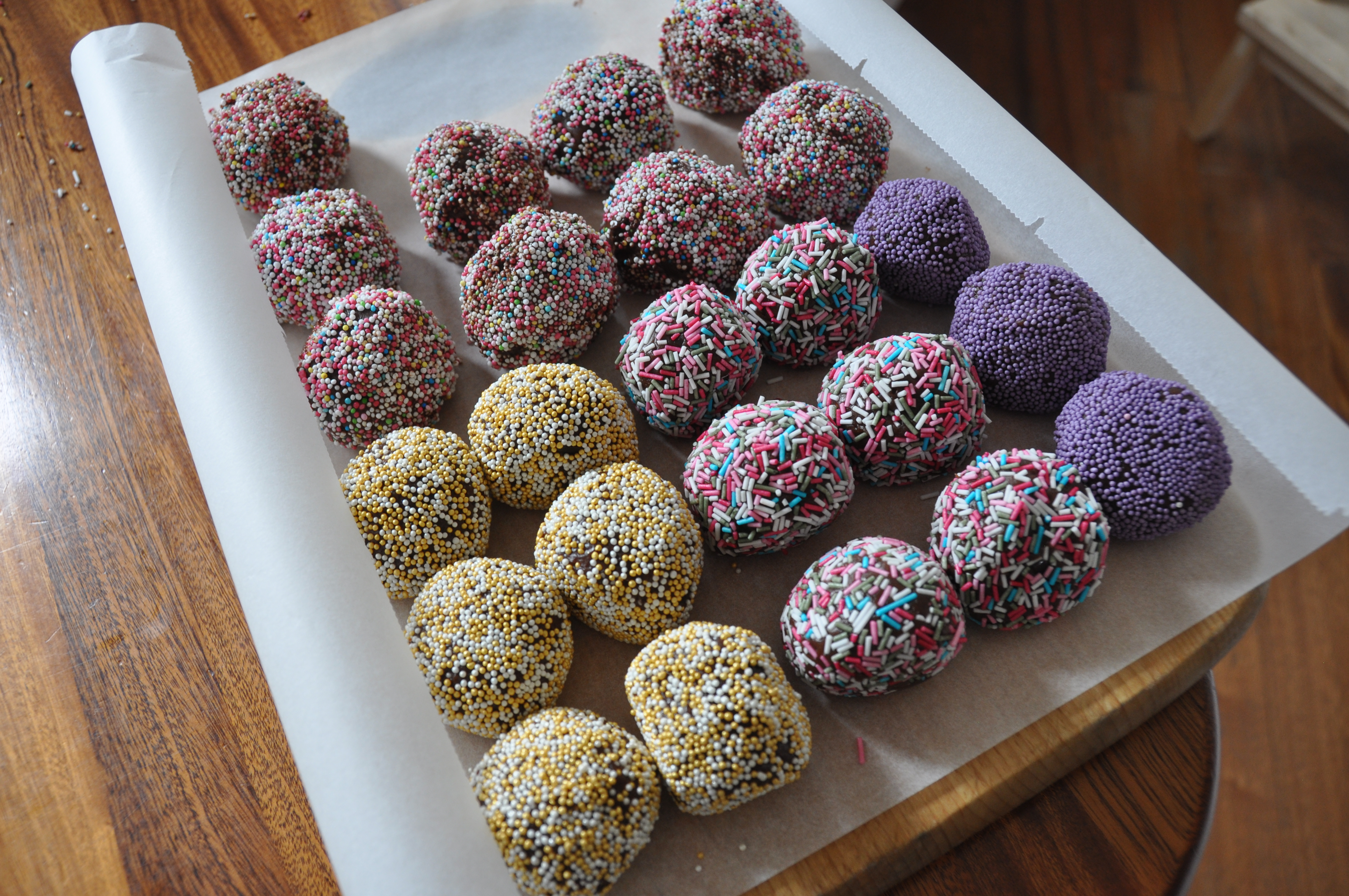
Romkugler (Denmark). Cocoa and rum flavoured balls of cookie butter rolled in a variety of sprinkles.

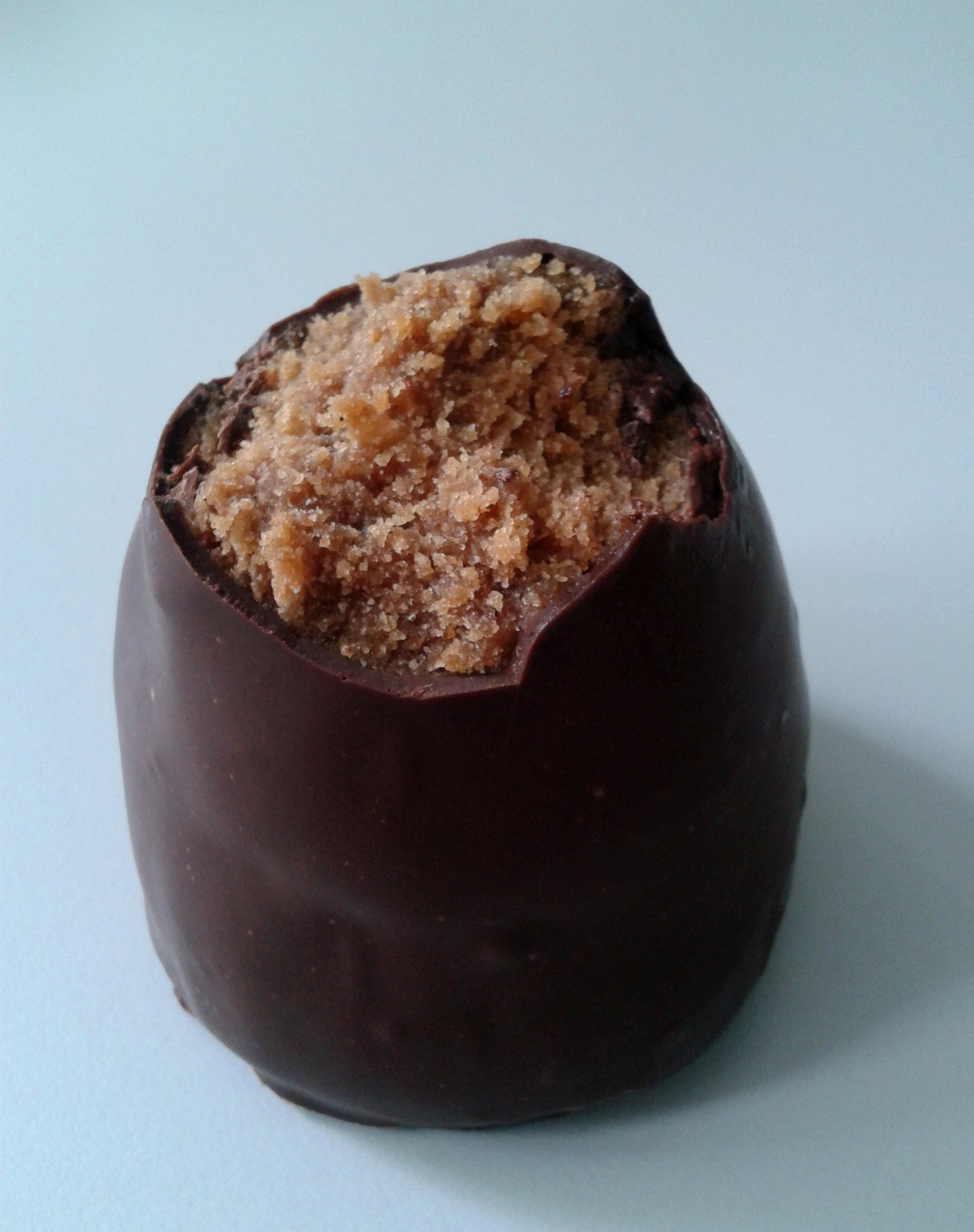
Granatsplitter (Germany). Cocoa and rum flavoured cookie butter (with butter) covered in dark chocolate.

== See also ==
- List of cookies
- Petit-Beurre
- Speculaas
