= Karel Boone =

Belgian businessman

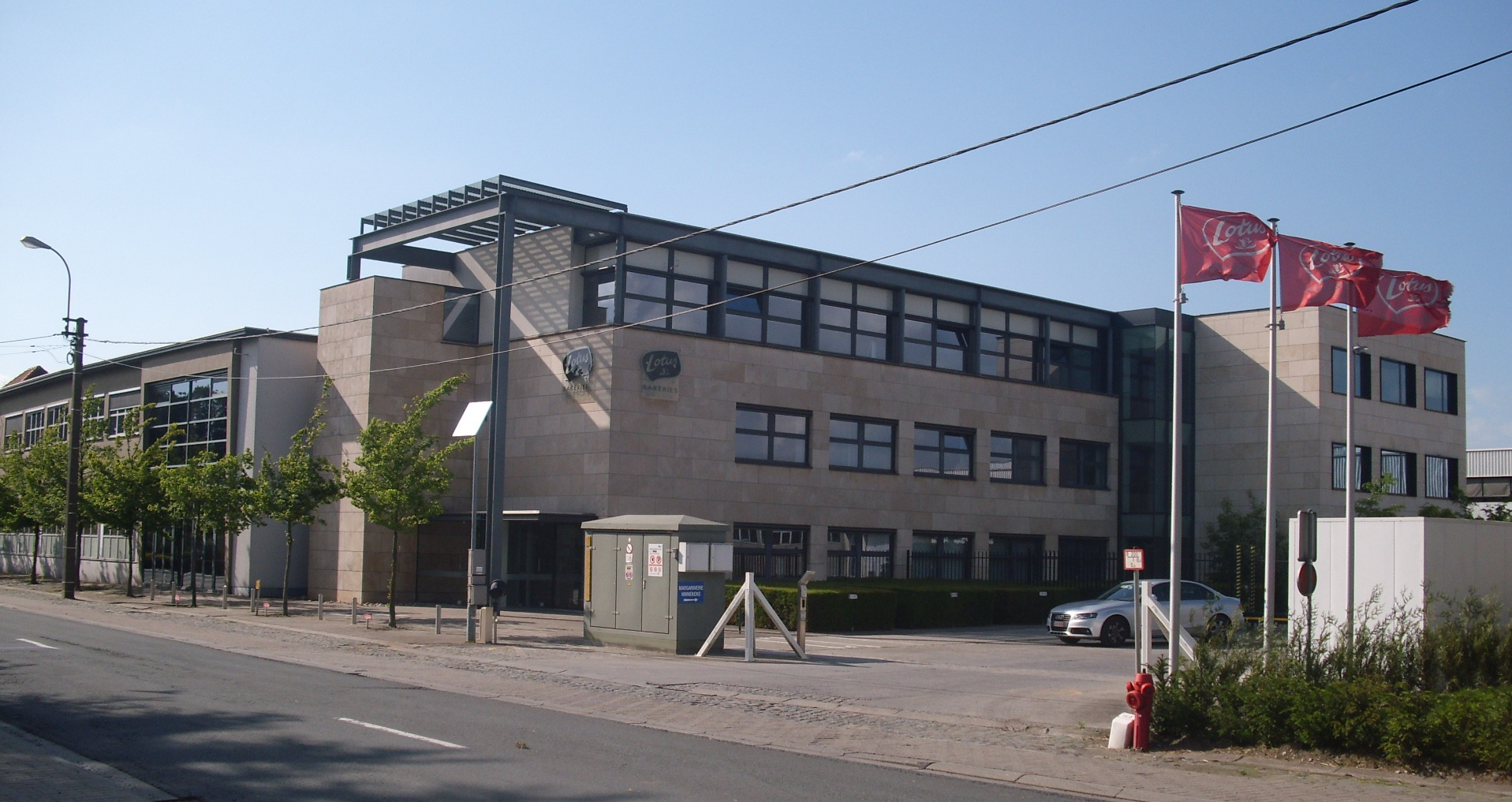
The headquarters of Lotus Bakeries, the company of which Boone was CEO for 32 years.

Karel, Baron Boone is a retired Belgian businessman, who was mainly active in the food industry in the later 20th century.

== Education ==
He obtained a master's degree as a Commercial Engineer at the Katholieke Universiteit Leuven (Leuven, Belgium).

== Career ==
Karel Boone started his career in 1966 as an executive member of the Board of Directors of the Belgian company Lotus Bakeries (Lotus Biscuits at this time). He became the CEO in 1974 when Lotus Biscuits merged with Corona. He also became Chairman of the Board of Directors of the company in 1992.

Besides his activities at Lotus, he is a member of the following Boards of Directors : Axa Belgium, Banque Degroof, Bois Sauvage, Vandemoortele (Chairman) and Van Steenberge. He is active in professional organizations : he has been the Chairman of the Federation of Belgian Companies, Chairman of Choprabisco (Biscuits, Chocolate and Confectionery) and member of the Board of the Fevia federation (Food in Belgium).

Karel Boone, the son of founder Jan Boone, was the CEO of Lotus for 32 years, and then the president of the company for 20 years (1974–2012). In 2012, his brother Mathieu took over.

== Sources ==
- Cercle de Lorraine
