= Maison Dandoy =

Bakery in Brussels, Belgium

Biscuiterie Dandoy
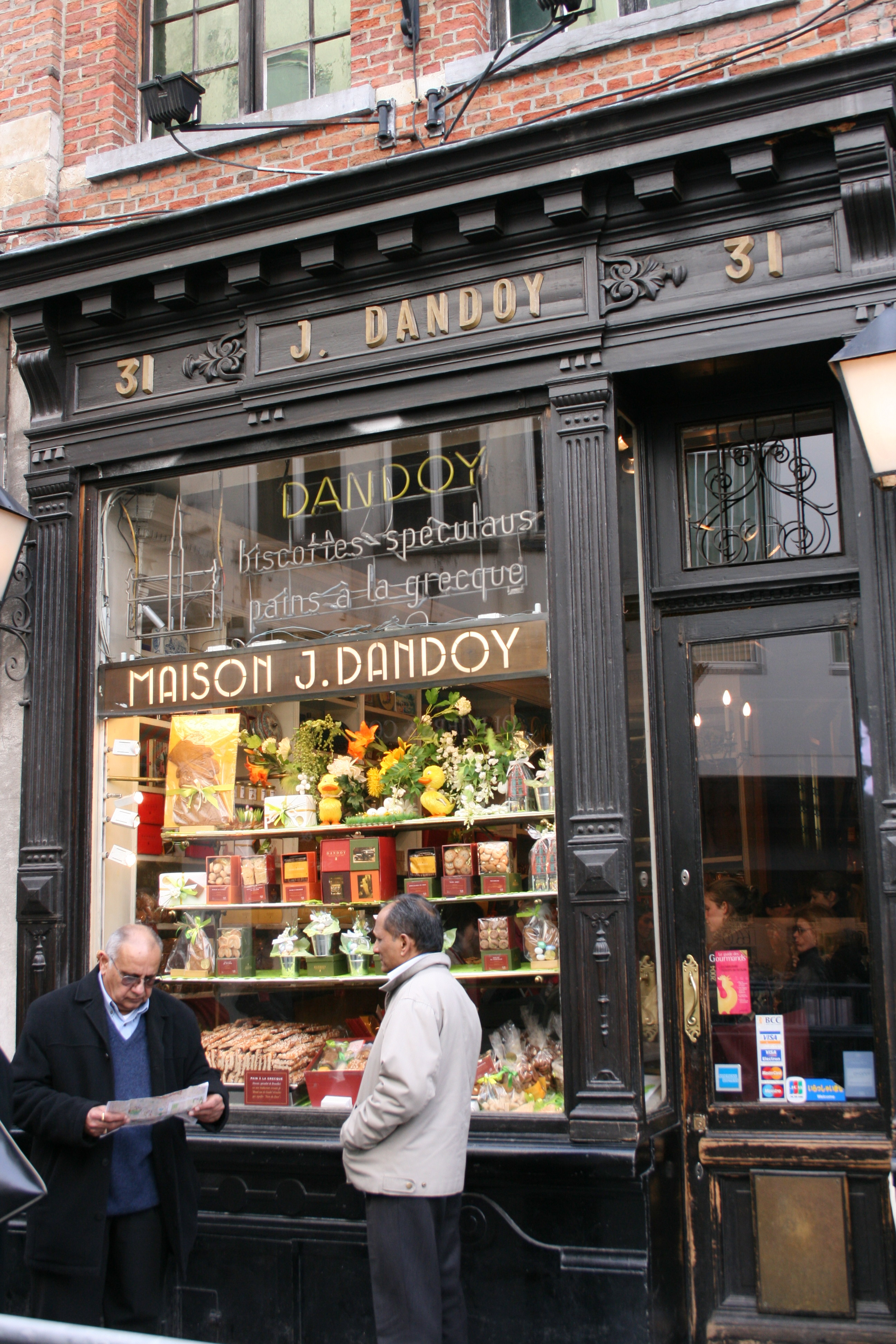
- Maison Dandoy shop at 31 Rue au Beurre in 2008.
- Trade name: Maison Dandoy
- Type: Private
- Industry: Food
- Founded: 1829; 197 years ago in Brussels, United Kingdom of the Netherlands
- Founder: Jean-Baptiste Dandoy
- Headquarters: 31 Rue au Beurre/Boterstraat, City of Brussels, Belgium
- Number of locations: 13 stores (2026)
- Products: Marzipan; Pain à la grecque; Speculoos
- Website: maisondandoy.com

Biscuiterie Dandoy, operating under the brand name Maison Dandoy, is a Belgian biscuitery founded in 1829 and based in Brussels. The company's best-known product is speculoos, a type of spiced cookie.

Maison Dandoy is regarded as the oldest biscuit manufacturer in Brussels. The company remains family-owned and is currently operated by the seventh generation of the Dandoy family. Its headquarters is located on Rue au Beurre/Boterstraat, near the Grand-Place.

== History ==
The biscuiterie was founded in 1829 by Jean-Baptiste Dandoy, a baker from Uccle, who opened his first shop on the Rue du Marché aux Herbes/Grasmarkt. The original speculoos recipe is traditionally attributed to him, and production methods such as hand-kneading dough and using wooden moulds are still in use. In 1858, his son Philippe relocated the business to Rue au Beurre 31, near the Grand-Place.

In the 1860s, the bakery had already gained recognition, with the French poet Charles Baudelaire reportedly among its customers during his stay in Brussels. In 1905, a company was established to manage the business, and the brand name and logo were registered in 1907. In the first half of the 20th century, the company was led by Jean-Philippe, grandson of the founder, followed by his daughter Fernande and her husband Valère Rombouts. During the Second World War, when flour was rationed, the only biscuit still produced was the “biscotte sucrée”, which is considered important to the company's continuity during this period. Full production of the company's traditional range resumed in 1948 under Valère Rombouts, who delayed the reintroduction of the full assortment until suitable ingredients such as butter and sugar meeting his quality standards became available again.

In the 1970s, leadership passed to Jean Rombouts-Dandoy and his wife Christiane. Jean, an engineer by training, is said to have declined a job offer from NASA in order to continue working in the family business. He is credited with popularising the “pain à la grecque”, which remains one of the company's best-known products.

Under their direction, the company experienced renewed growth in Brussels. This expansion was supported by pastry chefs Pierre and Willy, while Jean Rombouts-Dandoy remained involved in product development and Valère Dandoy continued to take an active interest in the business at an advanced age. The period also saw a modernisation of packaging and product presentation. As operations expanded, the Rue au Beurre site became too small to accommodate production, retail, and staff, which led to the construction of a larger workshop near the Port of Brussels.

The present public limited company structure was incorporated in 1990. The business was later taken over by Christine Dandoy and her husband Bernard Helson, under whose management the company expanded its retail network while maintaining artisanal production in Brussels.

In 2012, Maison Dandoy underwent a rebranding and expansion phase, introducing a new visual identity and opening additional locations, including an international branch in Daimaru Tokyo Station. Subsequently, Alexandre and Antoine Helson, sons of Bernard Helson, joined the company as representatives of the seventh generation, continuing to develop the business while maintaining its traditional recipes and identity.
