= Marché des Enfants-Rouges =

Oldest covered market in France

Coordinates: 48.8628°N 2.3620°E

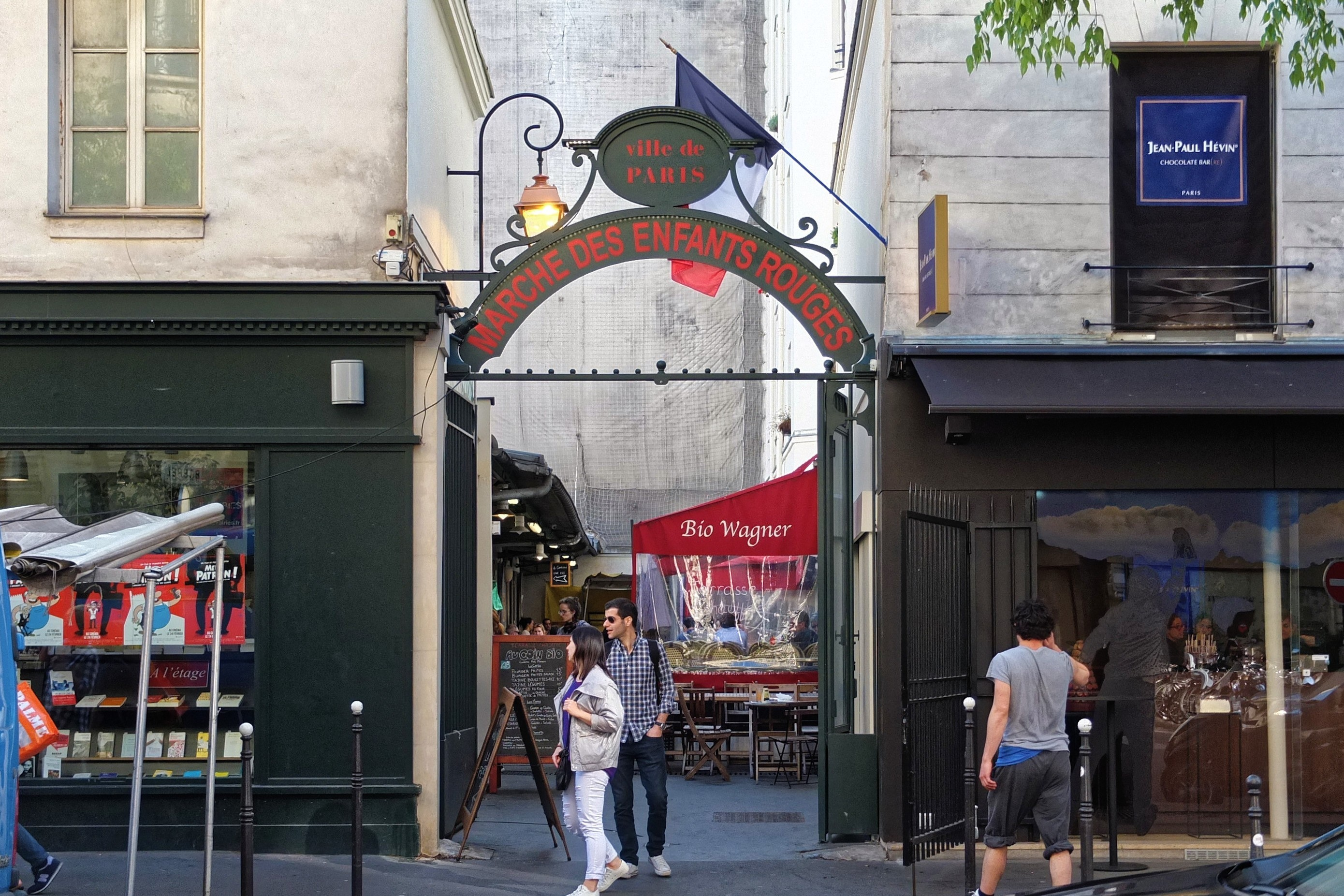
- Gate to Marché des Enfants-Rouges along Rue de Bretagne, 6 May 2016
- Interactive map of Marché des Enfants-Rouges
- Location: Paris, France

History
- Built: 1615
- Demolished: 12 October 2026

The Marché des Enfants-Rouges was the oldest covered market in Paris, France. It was established in 1615 under the reign of Louis XIII at 39 Rue de Bretagne in the Marais (3rd) arrondissement. The market has been listed as a historic monument since 1982. Prior to its destruction, the market offered fresh fruits, vegetables, flowers and bread, as well as restaurants where shoppers could buy cooked meals.

On the early morning of 12 October 2026, a violent fire completely destroyed the historic covered market hall and its metallic structure. The fire caused extensive damage to approximately 1,000 square meters of the market, but caused no major casualties.

== History ==
Entrée du Marché des Enfants-Rouges by Frédéric Houbron, 1907

The Marché des Enfants-Rouges was built in 1615 at the request of King Louis XIII, originally named the Petit marché du Marais after the Marais. In 1772, the market's name was changed to the Marché des Enfants-Rouges, after the nearby Hospice des Enfants-Rouges where orphans were clothed in red, a color representing charity.

The market was sold to the city of Paris in 1912.

== Recent developments ==
In the 1980s, plans to replace the market with an underground car park and public facilities met opposition from local residents and neighbourhood groups. The plans were later abandoned, and after six years of restoration, the market reopened in 2000.

== Destruction ==
In the early morning of 12 October 2026, a large fire started at around 3:00 am (CEST, UTC+02:00) but fire brigades did not receive calls until 4:15 am, at which time it had completely consumed the marketplace. More than 150 firefighters and 50 fire trucks arrived at the scene, with nine hoses, including two high-powered ones. With the marketplace irrevocably destroyed, firefighters instead worked to contain the fire and prevented it from spreading into surrounding buildings, including homes and shops. The marketplace suffered a total collapse, but no major injuries occurred. Paris Mayor Emmanuel Grégoire visited the site of the fire and announced plans to relocate vendors to another area so they could resume business.
