= Brussels cheese =

Type of cheese from Brussels, Belgium

Brussels cheese (French: fromage de Bruxelles Dutch: Brusselse kaas) is made from cow's milk and is considered a table cheese that is used for spreading and snacks. In texture it is smooth, with its taste being sharp and citrusy, with strong and salty bite. The cheese is regularly washed and dried over a period of at least three months, and is shaped into rounds or tubs.

== See also ==
- List of cheeses
