= Pain à la grecque =

Belgian Sweet Bread

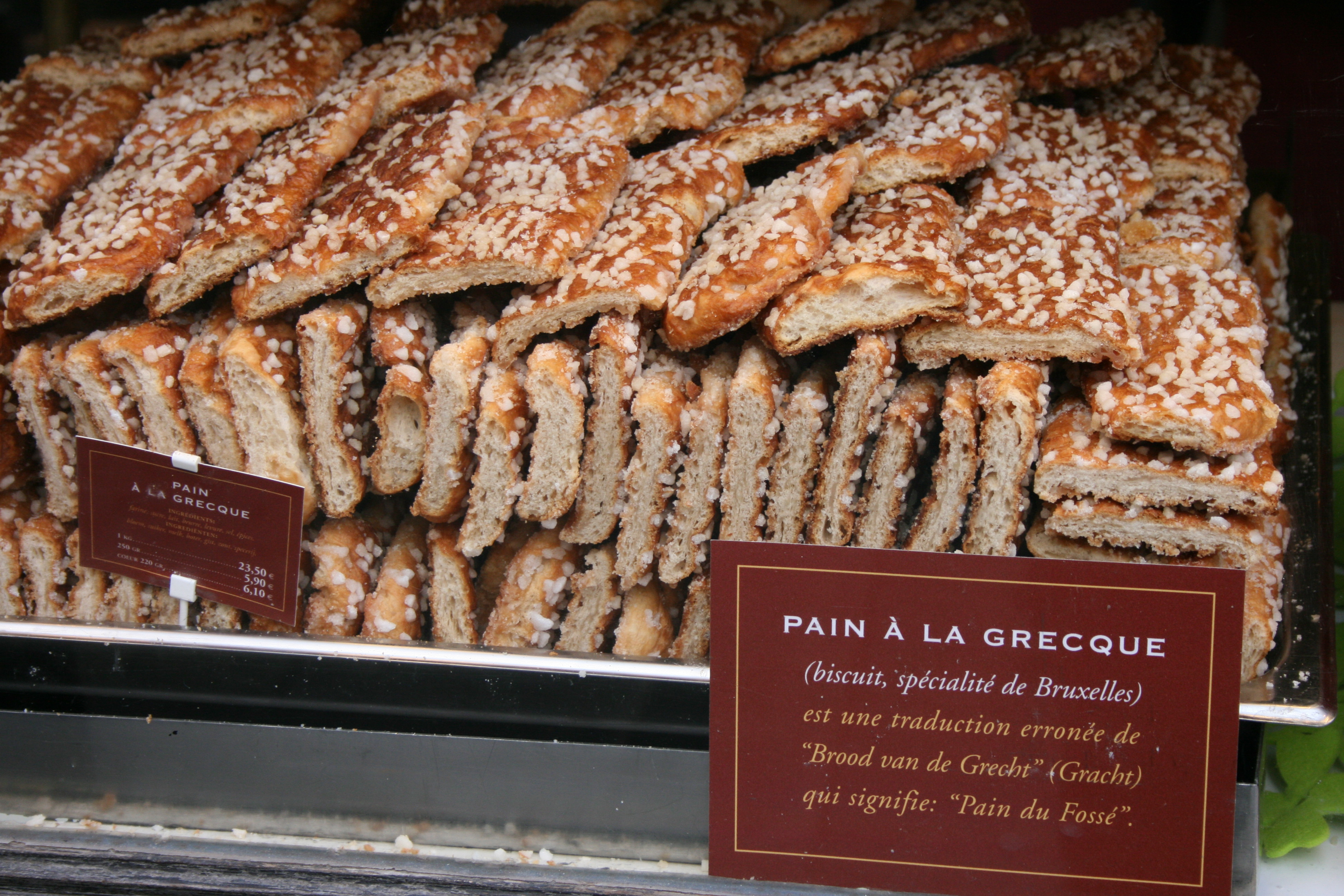
Pain à la grecque

The pain à la grecque is a Belgian sweet bread consisting of a simple rectangle of milk bread, brown sugar, and cinnamon sprinkled with granulated sugar.

The name translates as Greek Bread, but this was a Frenchification of the name. It was originally called Pain Grecht and was originally sold by an Augustinian monastery from 1589. The word "Grect" was the local word for the waterway that surrounded the monastery. Locals have also called the sweet bread Wolvengracht brood (Wolf canal bread) or Wolvengracht (Wolf canal). Believed to be a speciality in Brussels due to a book from 1829, however the product is also known to be sold in Antwerp.
