= Speculoos =

Type of biscuit

Speculaas / Speculoos
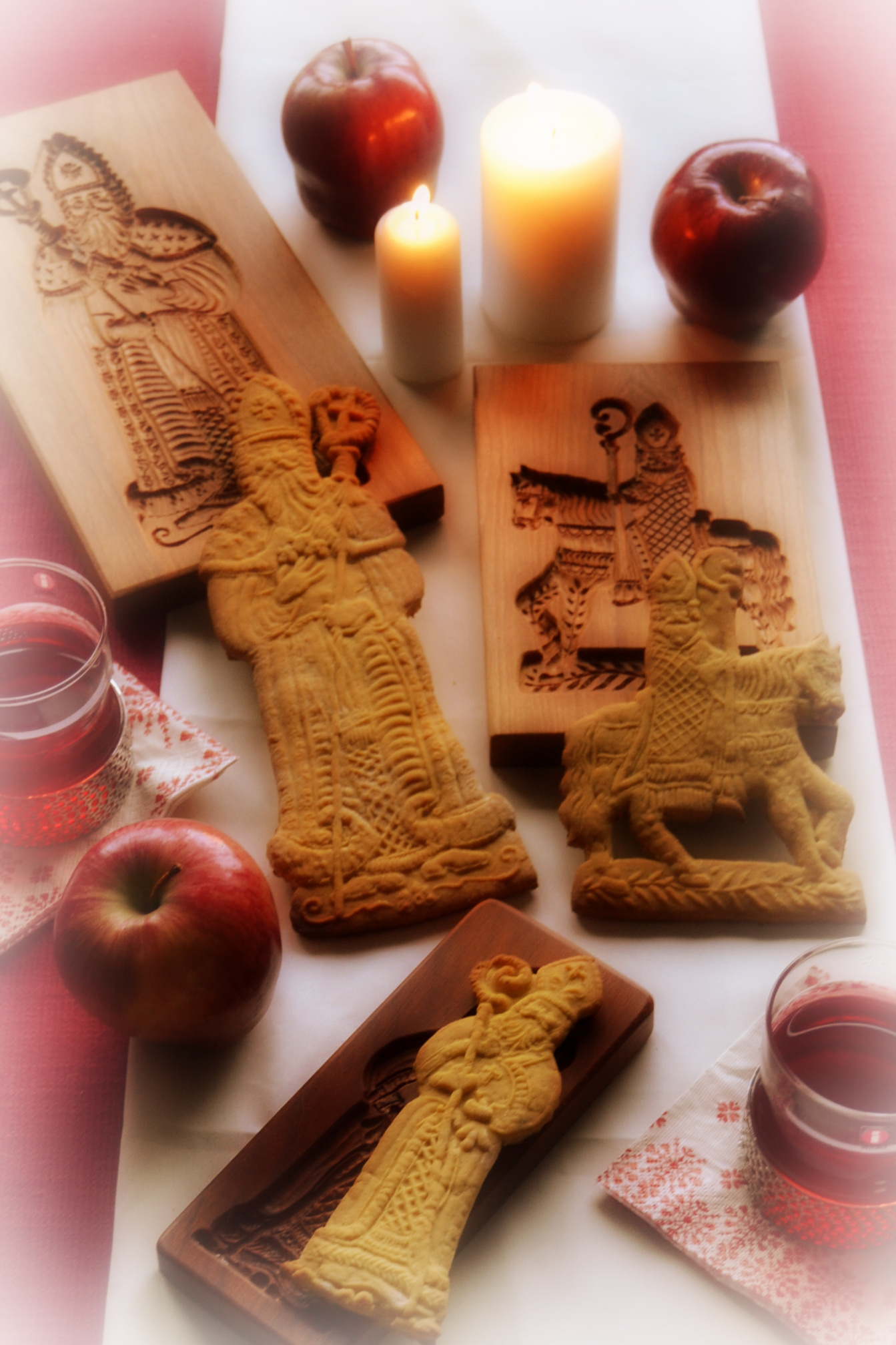
- Speculaas dolls of Saint Nicholas, with traditional wooden speculaas molds
- Type: Biscuit
- Course: Snack
- Associated cuisine: Belgian cuisine; Dutch cuisine
- Serving temperature: Room temperature
- Main ingredients: Wheat flour, sugar, cinnamon; Speculoos: sugar syrup; Speculaas: granulated sugar, cloves, nutmeg, cardamom, white pepper; sometimes mace, ginger, coriander
- Variations: Biscuits: thin biscuits; molded figures; chunky speculaas (thicker biscuits); stuffed speculaas (filled with almond paste); bread toppings: speculoos spread; schuddebuikjes (small speculaas crumbs)
- Other information: Regional terminology and spice mixtures differ; see Terminology section

Speculaas or speculoos is a biscuit with origins in the historical region of the Low Countries (modern-day Belgium and the Netherlands).

In the Dutch language, producers and vendors of these biscuits usually distinguish between two primary variants: speculaas [speːkyˈlaːs] refers to the more traditional variant, made with a mix of various spices, which is nowadays most popular in the Netherlands; speculoos [speːkyˈloːs] refers to a Belgian variant that omits the traditional spices in favour of caramelized sugar for flavour, and which is nowadays the most common variant in Belgium and worldwide. In common parlance these distinctions are not always made as strictly, with many Flemish people using the term speculoos to refer to both.

Also in French there is usually no distinction made, with the term spéculoos [spekylos] being used for both variants (less commonly spelled spéculos or spéculaus). In German, local variants similar to Dutch speculaas are known as Spekulatius [ʃpekuˈlaːtsi̯ʊs], whereas Belgian speculoos is instead sold as Karamellgebäck ("caramel biscuits").

In the 21st century, Belgian caramelized speculoos has become increasingly well-known worldwide by the commercialized name Biscoff (/ˈbɪs.kɒf/ BISS-koff), produced by Lotus Bakeries.

== Etymology ==
The Dutch name speculaas evolved from the older form speculatie (speculation), used to mean "desire" or "pleasure". Originally, speculatie described fine baked goods, appealing to sophisticated tastes. The German name Spekulatius was derived and latinized from this. Over time, this term developed dialectal variations like speculacie and speculasie, in which later the ie-suffix was erroneously interpreted as diminutive—eventually resulting in the non-diminutive form known today as speculaas.

The Belgian term speculoos is a dialectal variations of speculaas, specifically a Brabantian dialect pronunciation, reflecting the Brabantian backing and rounding of long /aː/, through an intermediate /ao/ or /ɔː/-like pronunciation. The French form spéculoos was derived from this.

The brand name Biscoff, used for speculoos produced by Lotus Bakeries, comes from the English words biscuit and coffee, promoting it as a biscuit for eating with your coffee.

== History ==
The exact origin of speculaas is not precisely established. The earliest known attestation is the form speculatie in the bakers' ordinance from the Dutch city of Haarlem in 1749. It emerged in the eighteenth century as a successor to the older klaasjes or klaaskoeken, similar cakes documented in seventeenth-century Amsterdam and traditionally eaten during the Sinterklaas celebrations. They were based on sweet cakes made from rye flour and honey, which changed to wheat flour and sugar in the 17th century. Spices such as cinnamon, nutmeg and cloves were imported in large quantities from Asia by Dutch traders from the 17th century onwards, and their wide availability led to experimentation with spices in baked goods. Early speculaas had much more cloves and much less sugar than modern variants. The use of cassonade has also been linked to techniques developed by Dutch colonists in the Antilles, documented from 1654.

Historically, people used to give speculaas dolls (Dutch: vrijerspop, lit. 'suitor's doll') as a declaration of love during Sinterklaas festivities. These were available in various sizes and with various decorations, including sugar, nuts, and even leaf gold. Related customs varied between regions and villages; one example is that the recipient would start eating from the head to accept the suitor's marriage proposal, and from the feet to reject it.

Food historian Pierre Leclercq has suggested a possible connection with the Italian mustacciuoli, a spiced biscuit that may have influenced similar preparations. A related recipe appears in 1604 in L’Ouverture de cuisine by Lancelot de Casteau, indicating the presence of spiced biscuit recipes in the region in the early 17th century.

=== History of Belgian caramelized speculoos ===
From the early 20th century onwards, industrial production contributed to the wider distribution of speculoos. This development was particularly significant in Flanders, where companies such as Lotus Bakeries, Vermeiren Princeps and Delacre expanded production. Industrialisation contributed to its widespread international popularity, while also altering its composition, shape, and texture. Increased sugar content and the use of vegetable oils resulted in a softer biscuit. At the same time, patterns of consumption changed: the large speculoos traditionally shared within families was gradually replaced by smaller, individually wrapped biscuits commonly served with coffee in restaurants and cafés.

Lotus Bakeries has been making speculoos since 1932. Early on, they used to have both the Dutch term speculaas and the French term spéculoos on the packaging of their speculoos. This was changed to speculoos in both languages.

In the 21st century, changing dietary habits, a growing preference for more healthful food (including less sugar and fat), and a demand for innovation have led artisans to develop variations on the traditional biscuit, such as gluten-free, whole grain, and flavoured varieties. At the same time, speculoos has remained a popular confection and has increasingly been incorporated into gastronomy, where it is used to enhance a range of culinary preparations.

In 2020, the Lotus Bakeries group announced that it would rename its best-known product “Biscoff” from 2021 onwards, aligning it with the branding already used outside Belgium, France, and the Netherlands. The decision generated significant public debate within Belgium and contributed to speculoos being added to the Inventory of Intangible Cultural Heritage in Brussels on 4 December 2020. Reactions reported in the media reflected concerns about preserving the traditional name, with figures such as Capiau and Brabanders expressing regret over the change and emphasising the importance of retaining the term “speculoos.”

== Variants ==
=== Traditional spiced speculaas ===
Speculaas biscuits in some of the traditional Dutch designs sold all year

The most traditional variants of speculaas are usually flat, crisp, spiced biscuits that are moulded to carry certain traditional images. They contain speculaas spices, which are a mix of cinnamon and other spices, such as nutmeg, clove, ginger, cardamom and black pepper — the actual spice mix varies by region and manufacturer. Together these spices are known as "speculaas spices" (Dutch: speculaaskruiden).

Historically it was popular to eat speculaas around the feast of Saint Nicholas (Dutch: Sinterklaas) in early December. The oldest sources on speculaas also mention weddings and fairs. However, it has become normal to eat speculaas all year round in the Netherlands, especially with coffee or tea, or with ice cream. As of 2021, they are the most commonly eaten type of cookie in the Netherlands. While traditional speculaas has been largely replaced by caramelized speculoos variants in Belgium, more traditional variants can still be found at local bakers throughout Belgium from St. Martin's Day in mid-November to Three Kings' Day in mid-January. However, the Belgian city of Hasselt still has its own traditional variant, which includes traditional spices and has been sold year-round since the mid-20th century.

Apart from Belgium and the Netherlands, traditional speculaas is also well known in adjacent areas in Luxembourg, northern France, and in the west of Germany (Westphalia and the Rhineland). Speculaas gained popularity in the former Yugoslav countries, where it is manufactured by the Croatian food company Koestlin. The cookie can also be found in Indonesia and is usually served there at Christmas or on other special occasions.

Dutch speculaas produced for souvenir shops or the foreign market are most commonly made in the shape of a windmill, and are often sold as "Dutch windmill cookies".

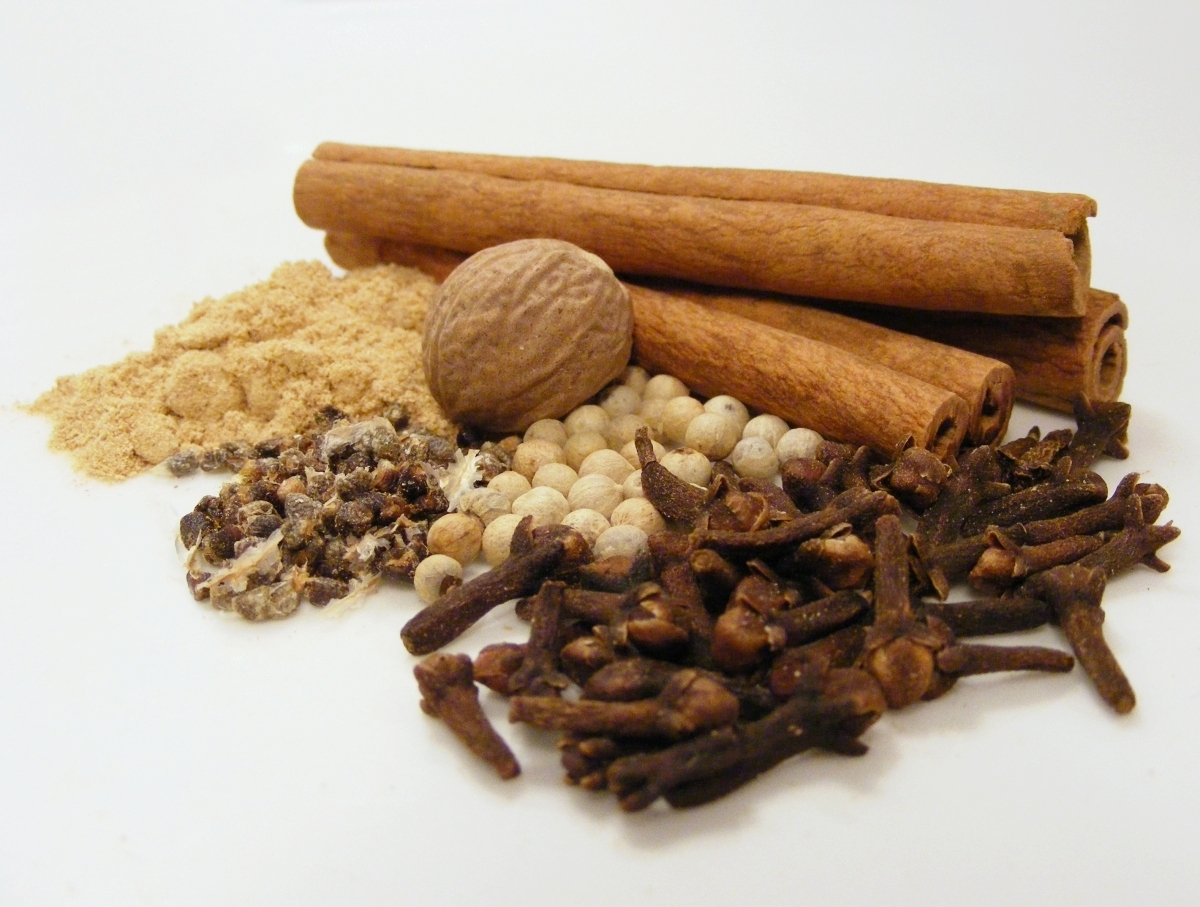
Traditional speculaas spices: cinnamon, cloves, nutmeg, white peppercorn, ginger powder, and cardamom seeds

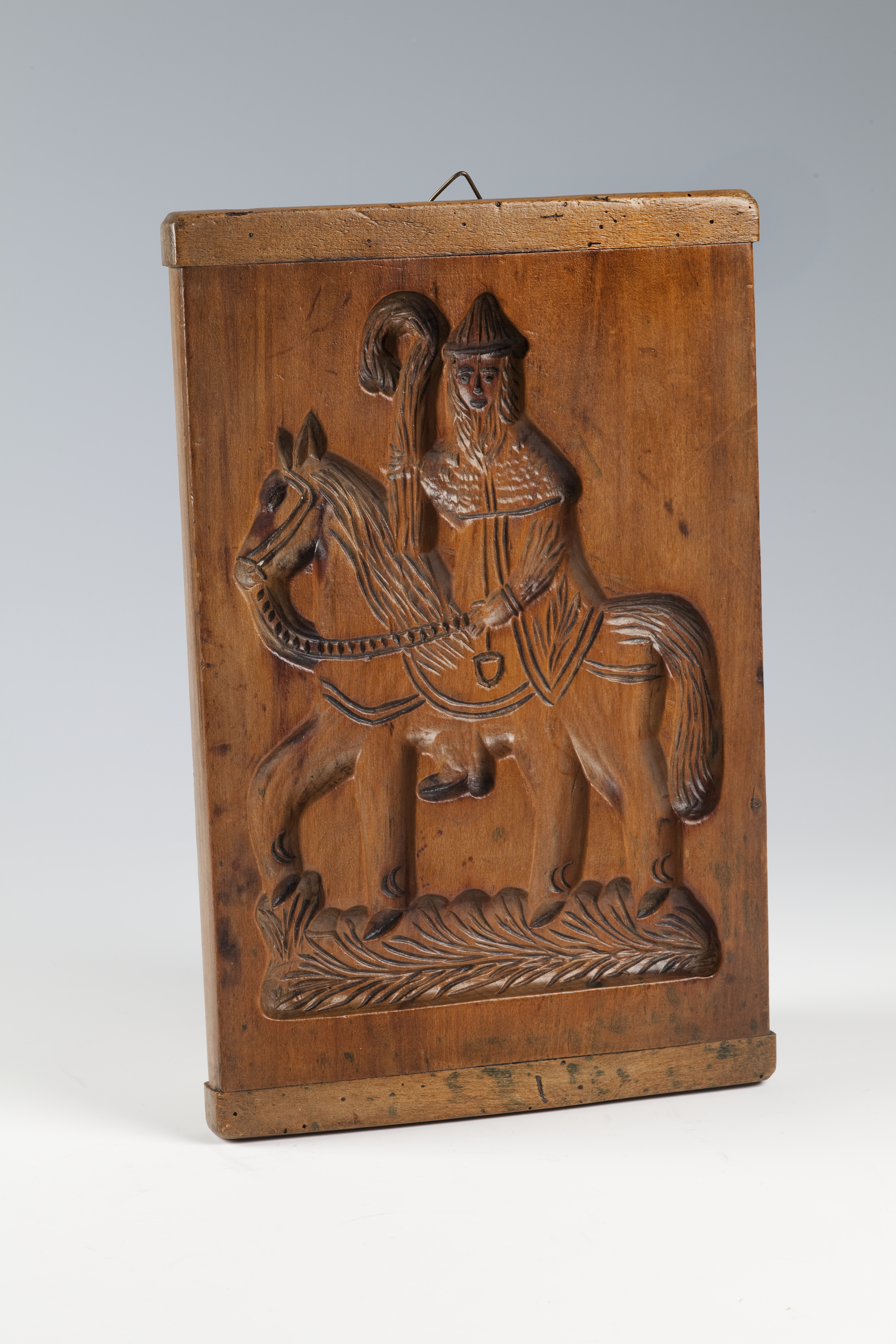
An 18th-century wooden speculaas mold depicting Saint Nicholas on a horse

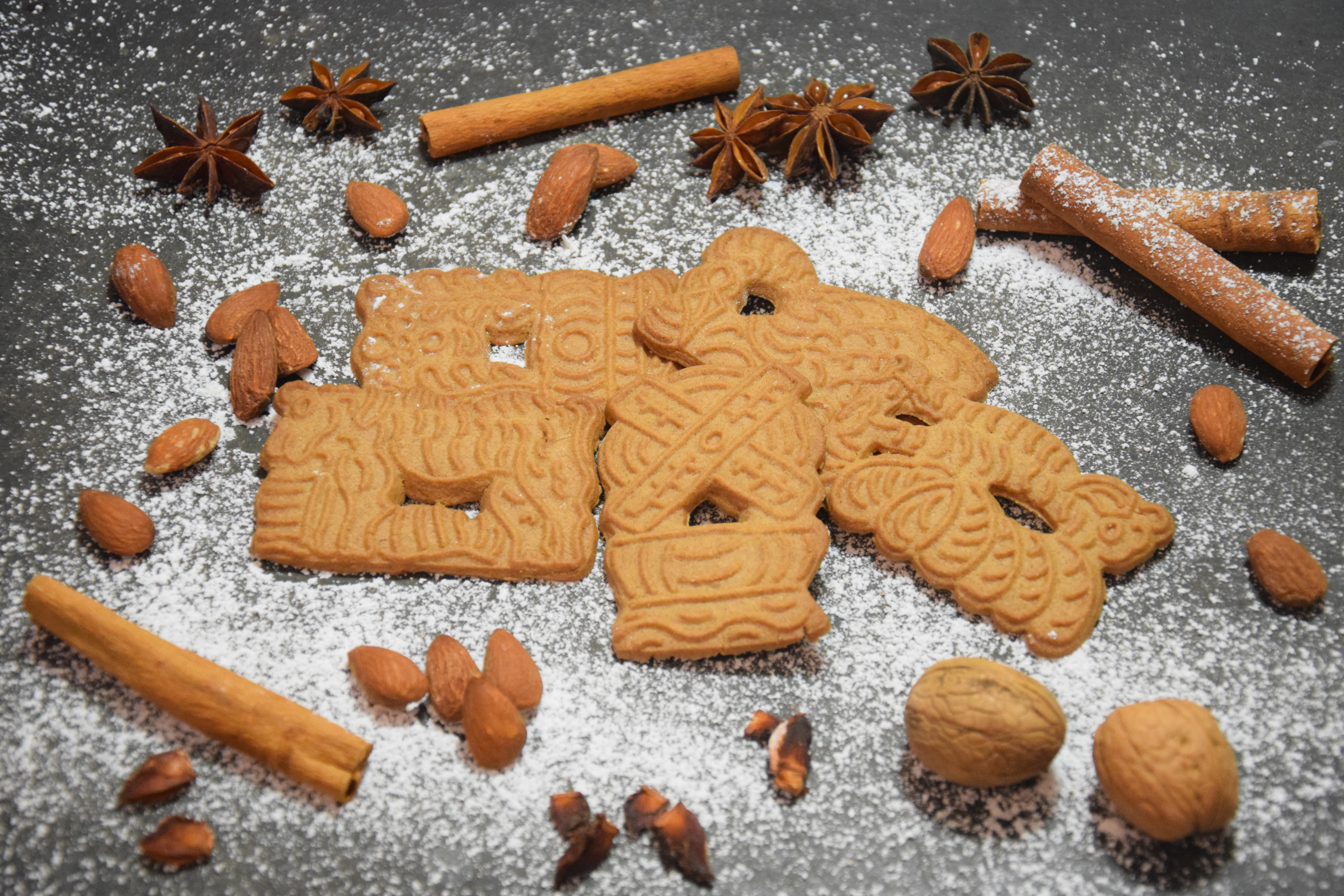
German Spekulatius with some of the ingredients used to make them

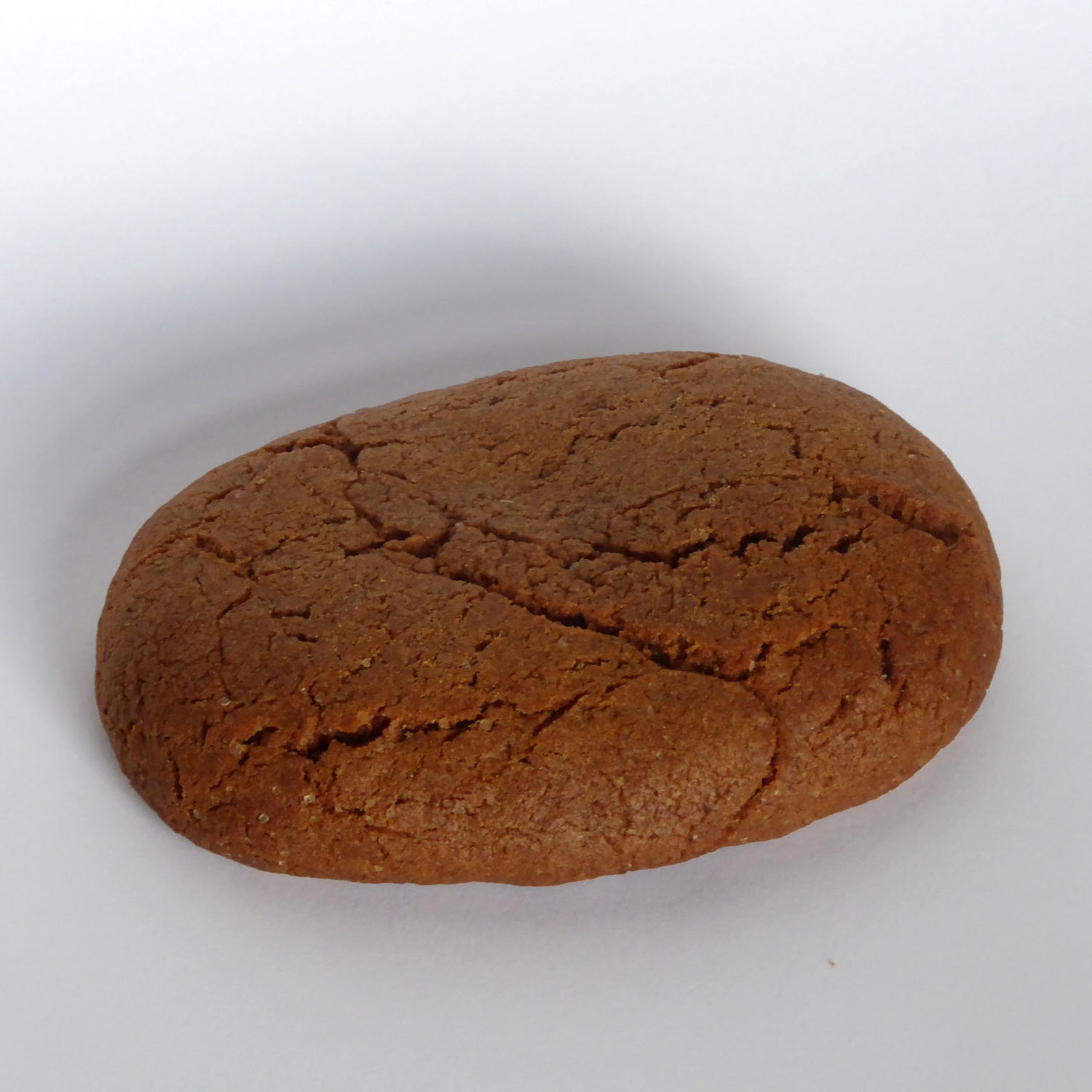
A traditional local variant of spiced speculaas from Hasselt, Belgium

=== Belgian caramelized speculoos ===
Modern Belgian speculoos omits the traditional spices in favour of caramelized sugar for flavour. It originated in the early 20th century as a cheaper alternative to traditional speculaas, because at the time spices were less wide available and more expensive in Belgium compared to the Netherlands. In Belgium, it has largely replaced its more traditional counterpart and has developed its own artisanal traditions, which have been added to the Inventory of Intangible Cultural Heritage in Brussels. Belgian speculoos biscuits typically do not have the traditional patterns of spiced speculaas.

Maison Dandoy, founded in 1829 in Brussels and established near the Grand-Place in 1858, is among the oldest still-operating producers of speculoos. The company continues to produce the biscuit using traditional wooden moulds, especially during festive periods.

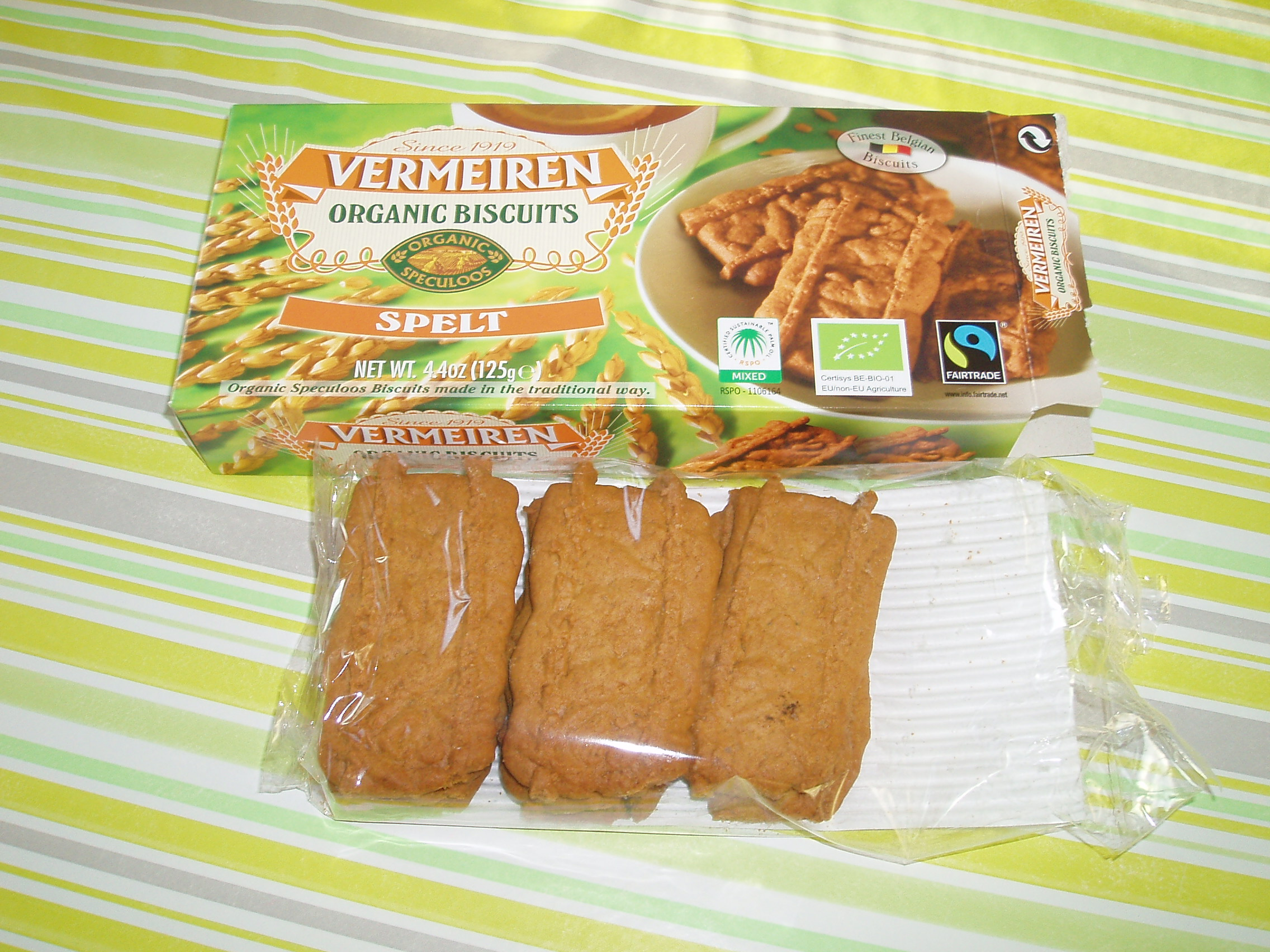
Speculoos by the company Vermeiren

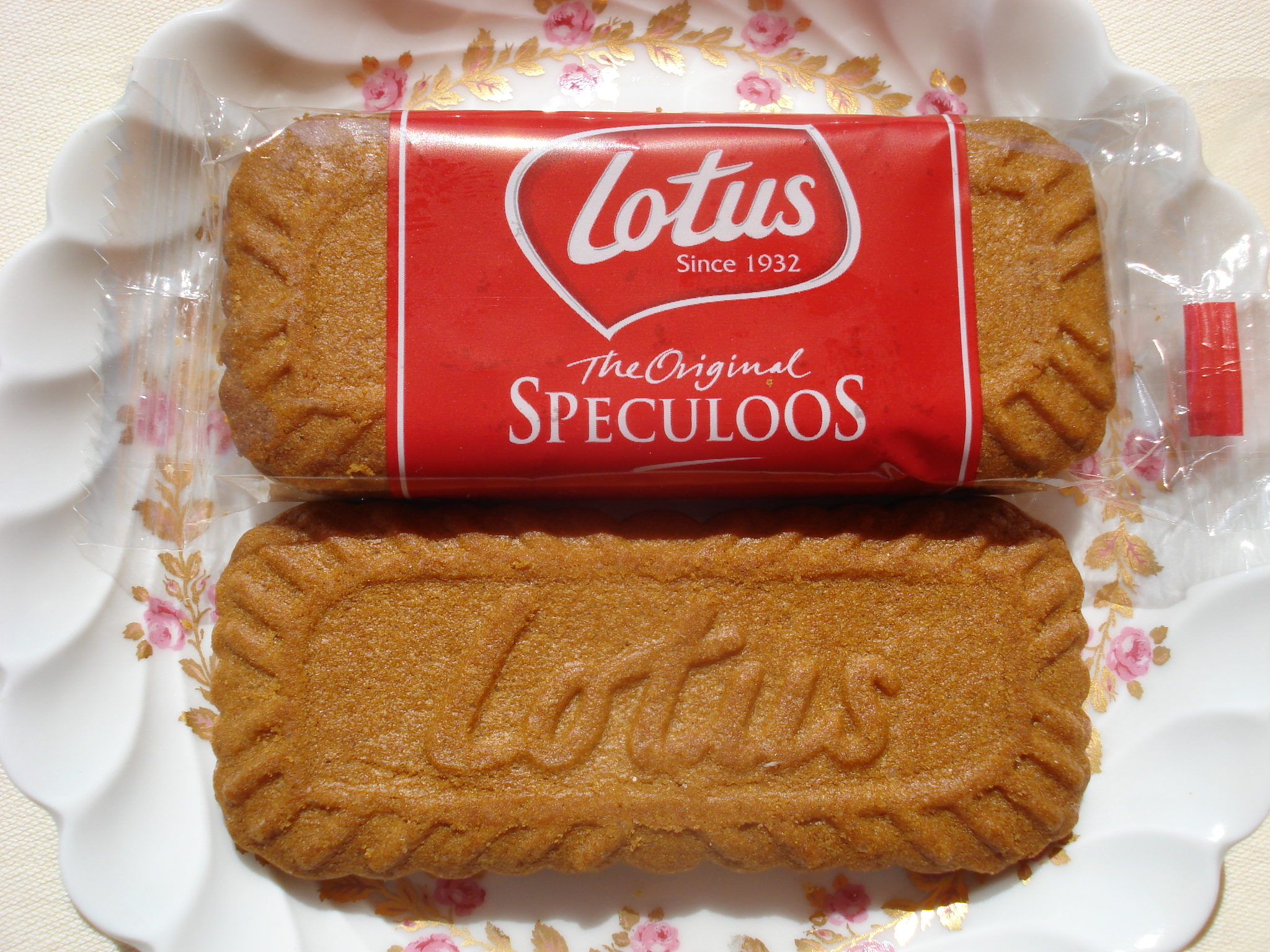
Speculoos by the company Lotus, also branded as Biscoff

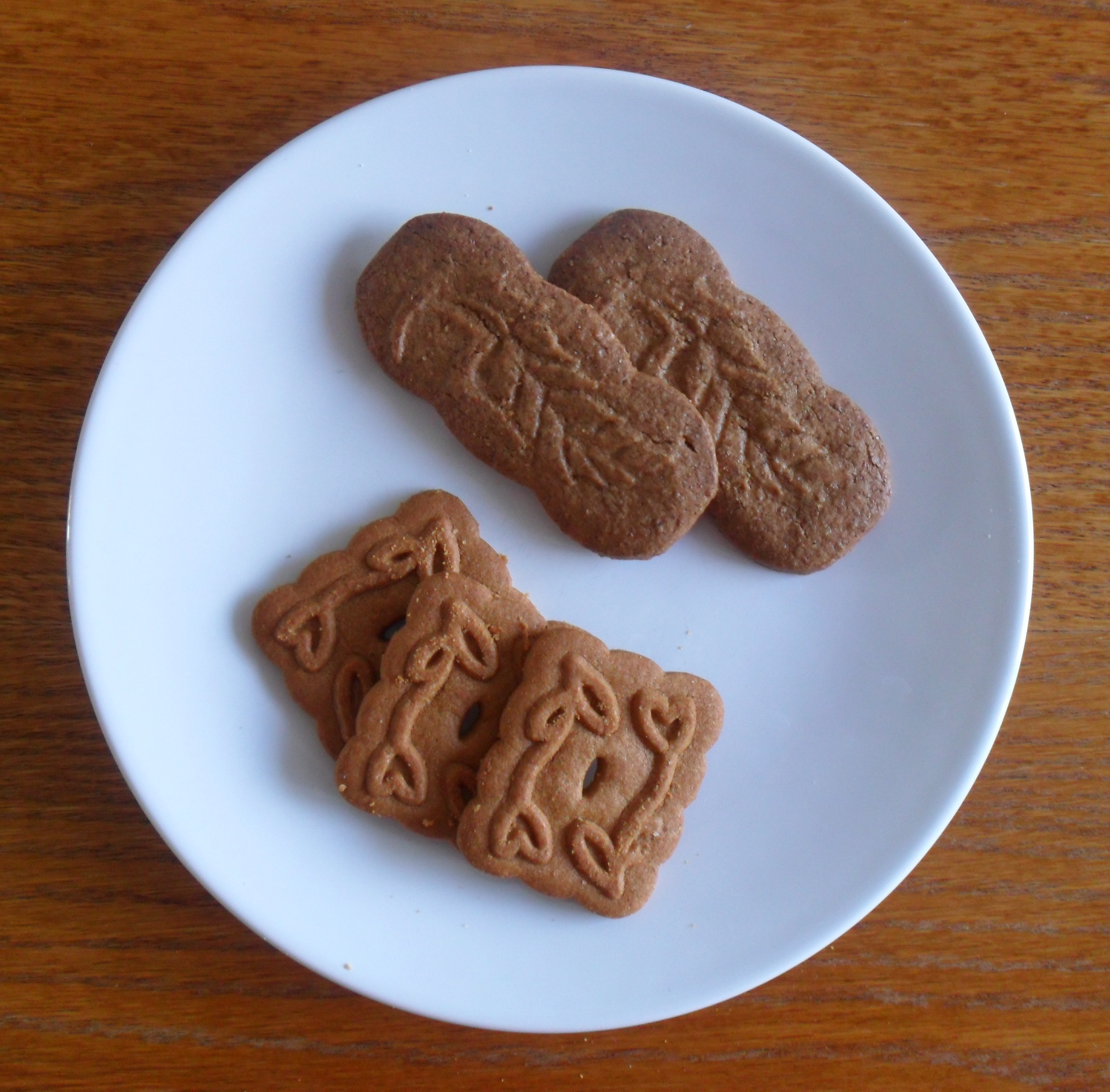
Belgian speculoos in different shapes

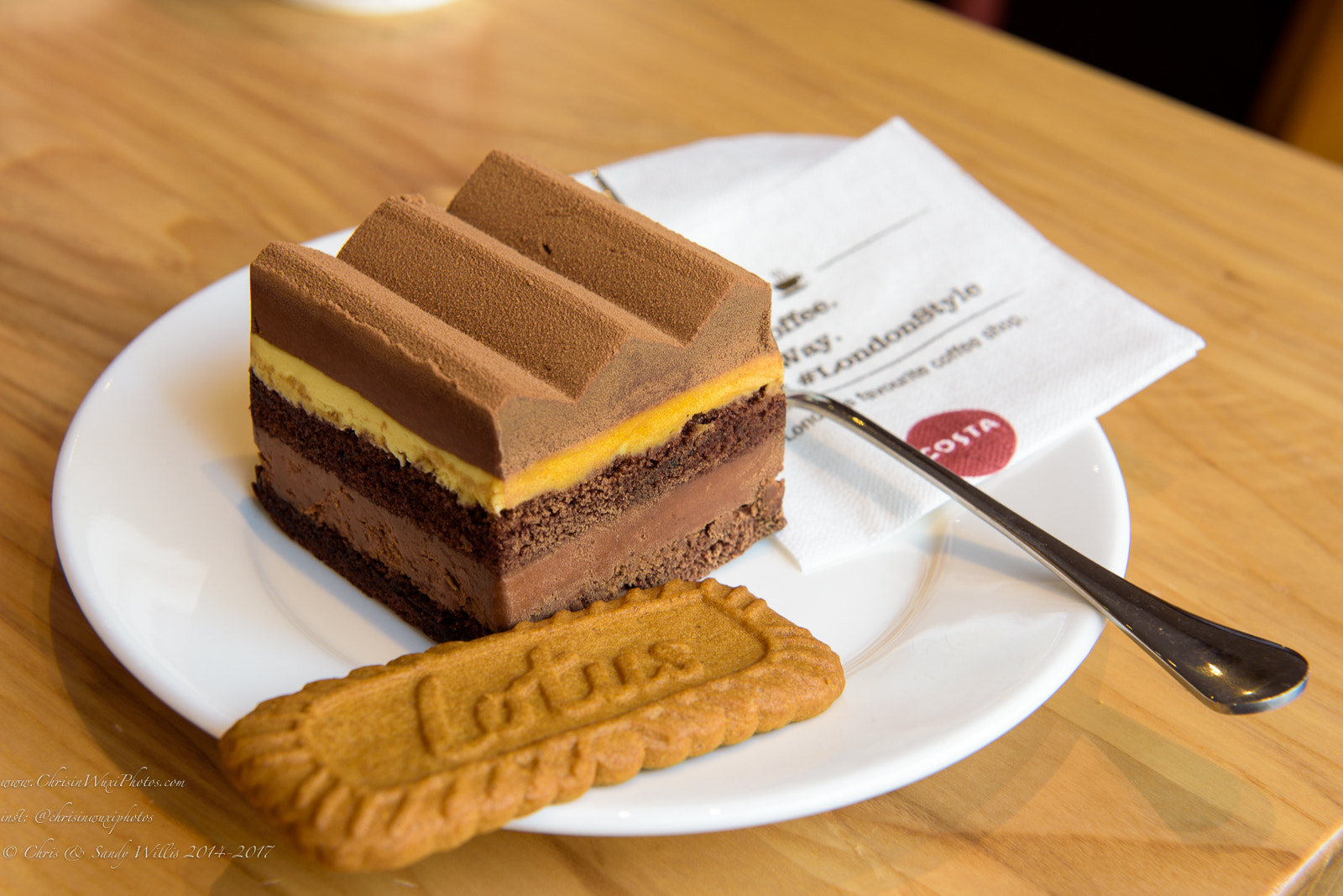
Chocolate cake served with Lotus speculoos in Hangzhou, China

=== Other Dutch and Belgian variants ===
Variants of speculaas include "stuffed speculaas" (Dutch: gevulde speculaas), a kind of shortcrust pastry made with speculaas spices and stuffed with almond paste, and thicker speculaas chunks (Dutch: speculaasbrokken). In the Netherlands, these are considered Sinterklaas products, which are sold from week 36 (late August or early September) up to the end of Sinterklaas festivities on December 5th.

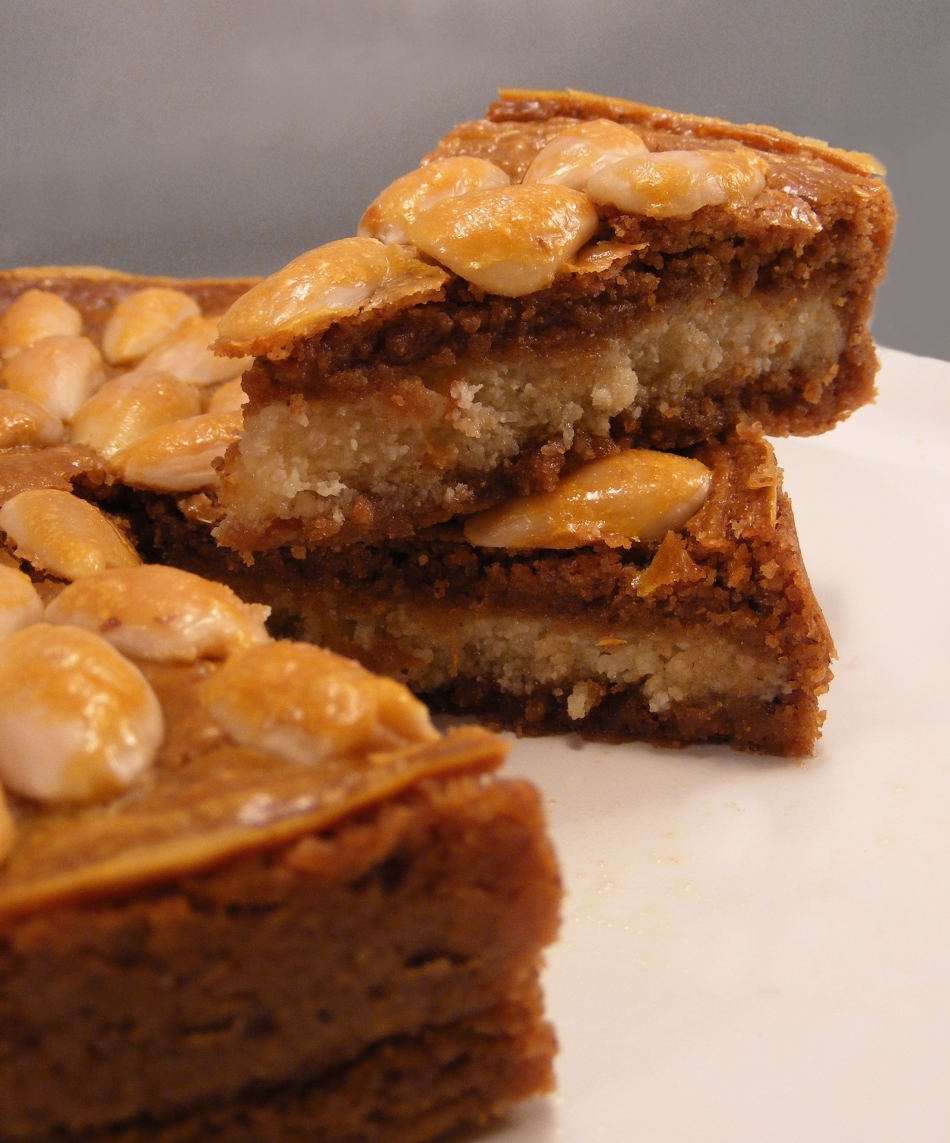
Gevulde speculaas, stuffed with almond paste

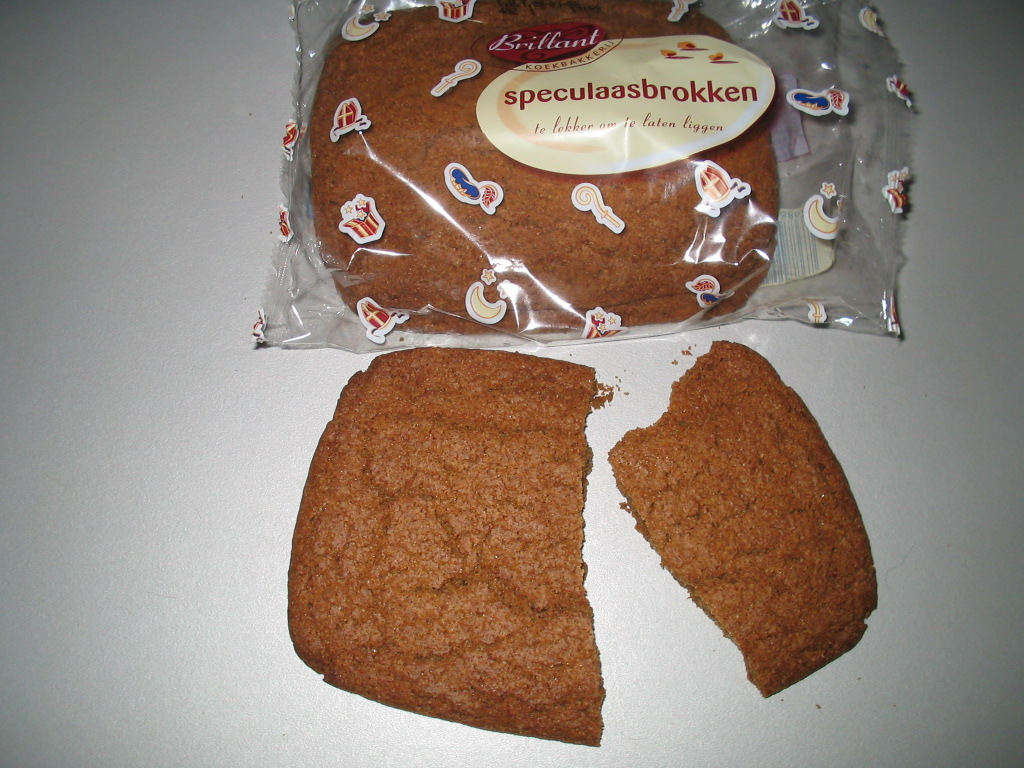
Speculaasbrokken

=== German variants ===
While traditional speculaas is most common in Germany (also known as Gewürzspekulatius, "spiced speculaas"), other variants also exist, made with the same cookie molds but from different types of dough. Mandelspekulatius ("almond speculaas") has fewer spices and is flavored with almond flour and almond shavings on the back. Butterspekulatius ("butter speculaas") has no spices and added butter.

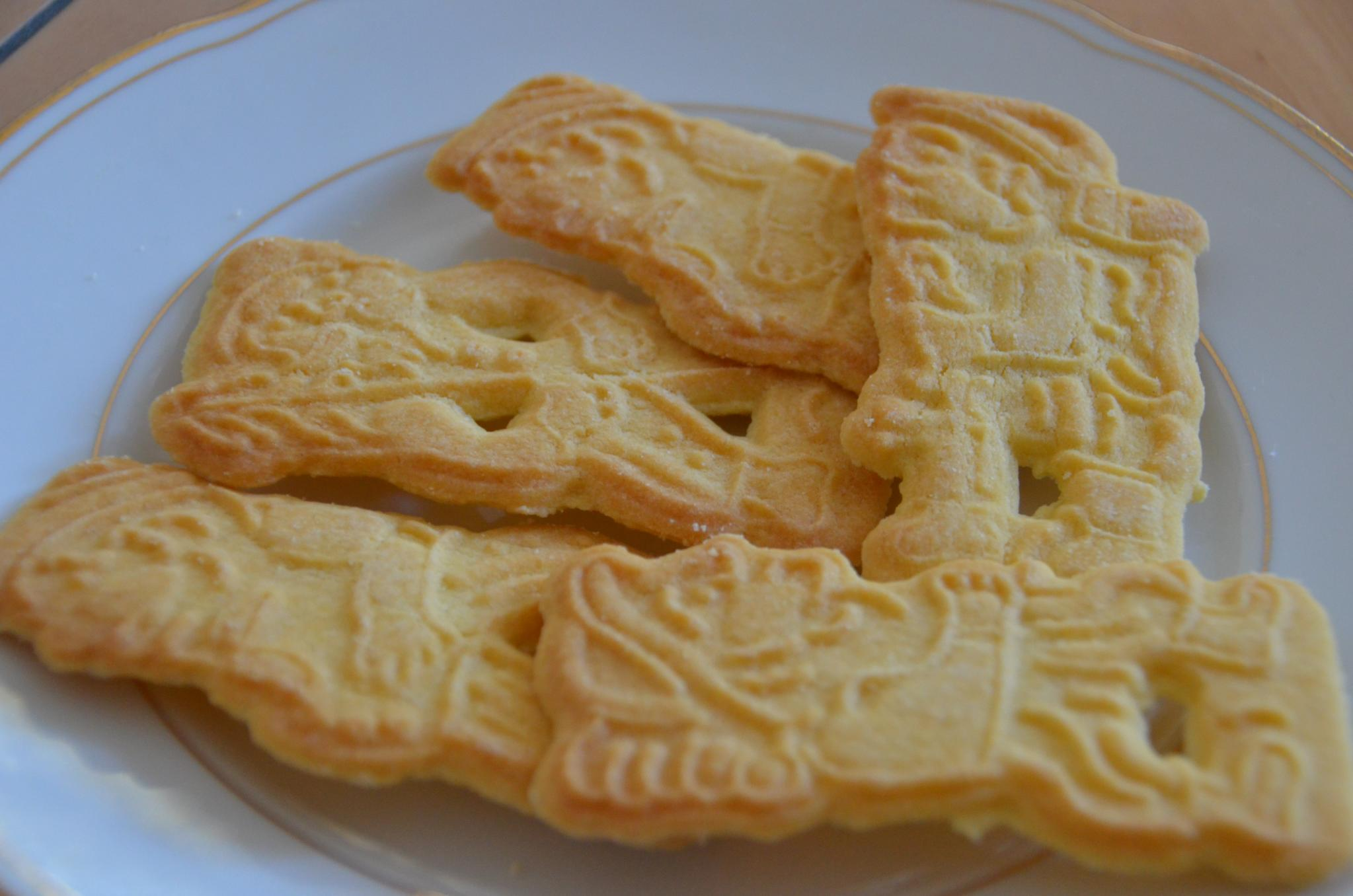
Butterspekulatius ("butter speculaas")

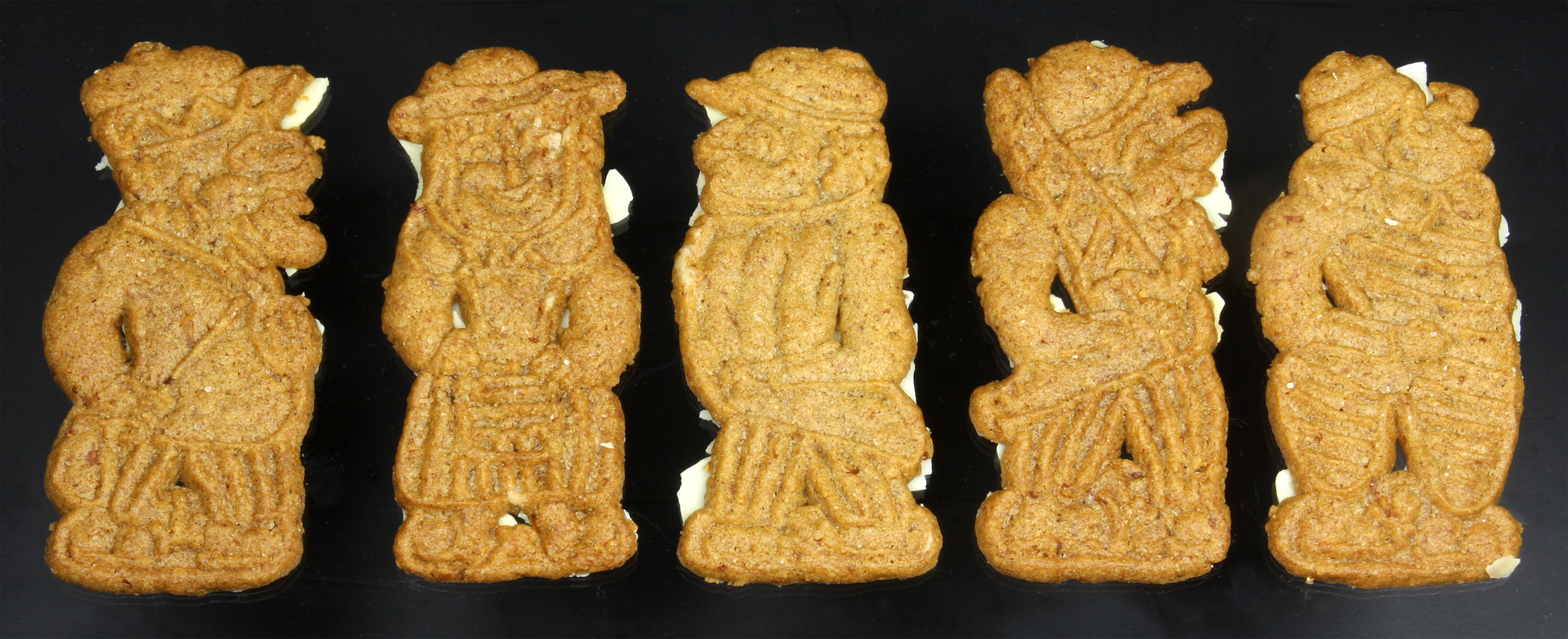
Mandelspekulatius ("almond speculaas")

== Other speculaas-based products ==
=== Kruidnoten ===
Kruidnoten are hard cookie-like confectioneries made from speculaas dough, roughly the size of a coin and shaped as a flattened hemisphere. They are traditionally associated with Sinterklaas festivities and commonly eaten in Belgium and the Netherlands.

=== Speculoos spread ===
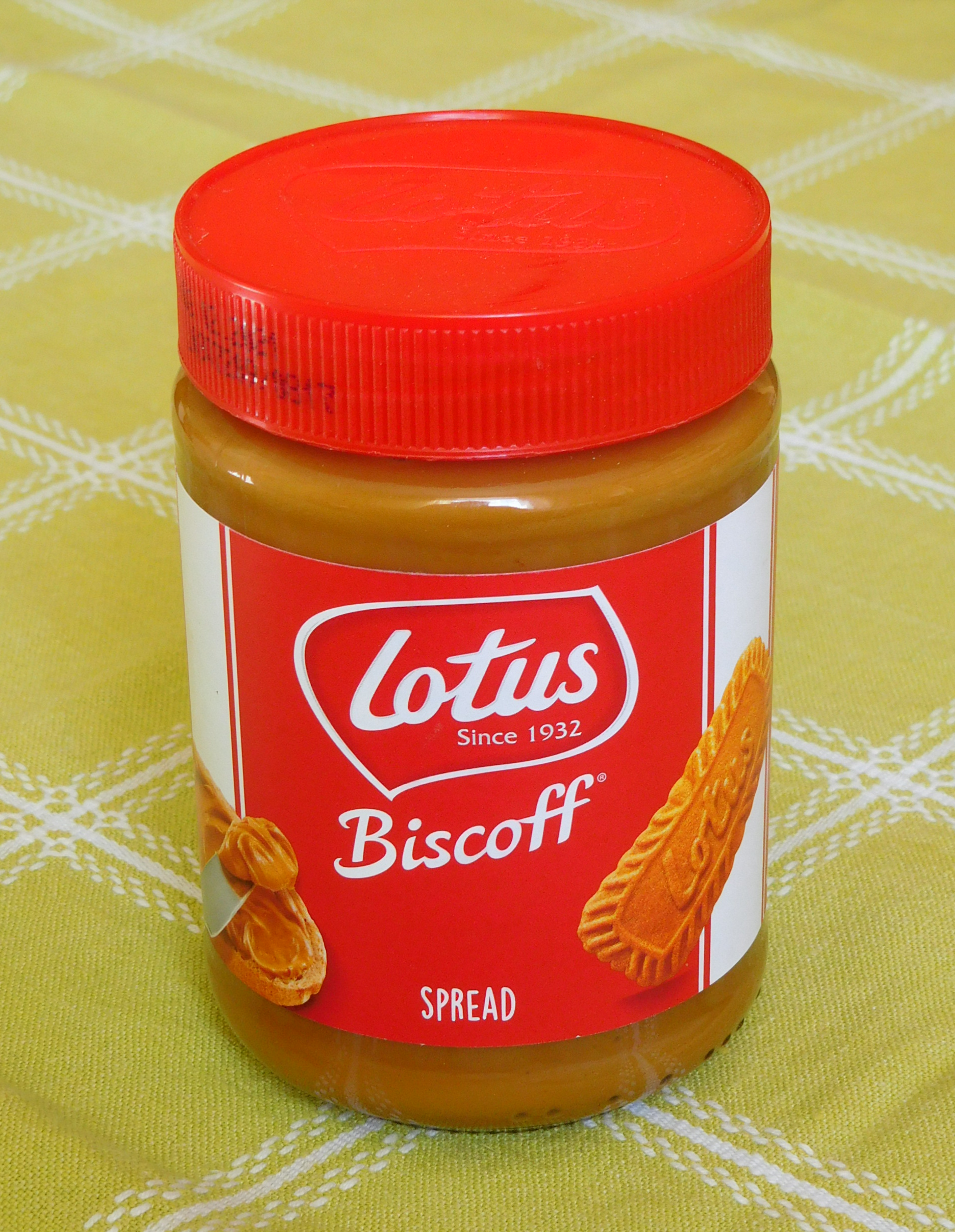
Lotus Bakeries' Biscoff spread

Workers in the Low Countries traditionally made a sandwich in the morning, putting speculoos or speculaas biscuits between buttered bread. The biscuits took on a spread-like consistency by lunchtime. In 2008, two competitors entered a contest on the Belgian television show, The Inventors (de Bedenkers), with a spread made from Belgian speculoos cookies—Els Scheppers, who reached the semi-finals, and the team of chef Danny De Mayer and Dirk De Smet, who were not selected as finalists. Spreads made from crushed speculoos biscuits went into production by three separate companies and became popular.

By 2007, several Belgian companies began marketing a speculoos paste, now available worldwide under various brands and names: as Speculla, Cookie Butter, and Biscoff Spread. As a form of spreadable speculoos biscuits, the flavour is caramelized and gingerbread-like, with a colour similar to peanut butter and a consistency ranging from creamy to granular or crunchy. The spread consists of 60% crushed speculoos biscuits and vegetable oils. In the United States the grocery chain Trader Joe's sells its own brand of cookie butter and cookie butter ice cream.

=== Schuddebuikjes ===
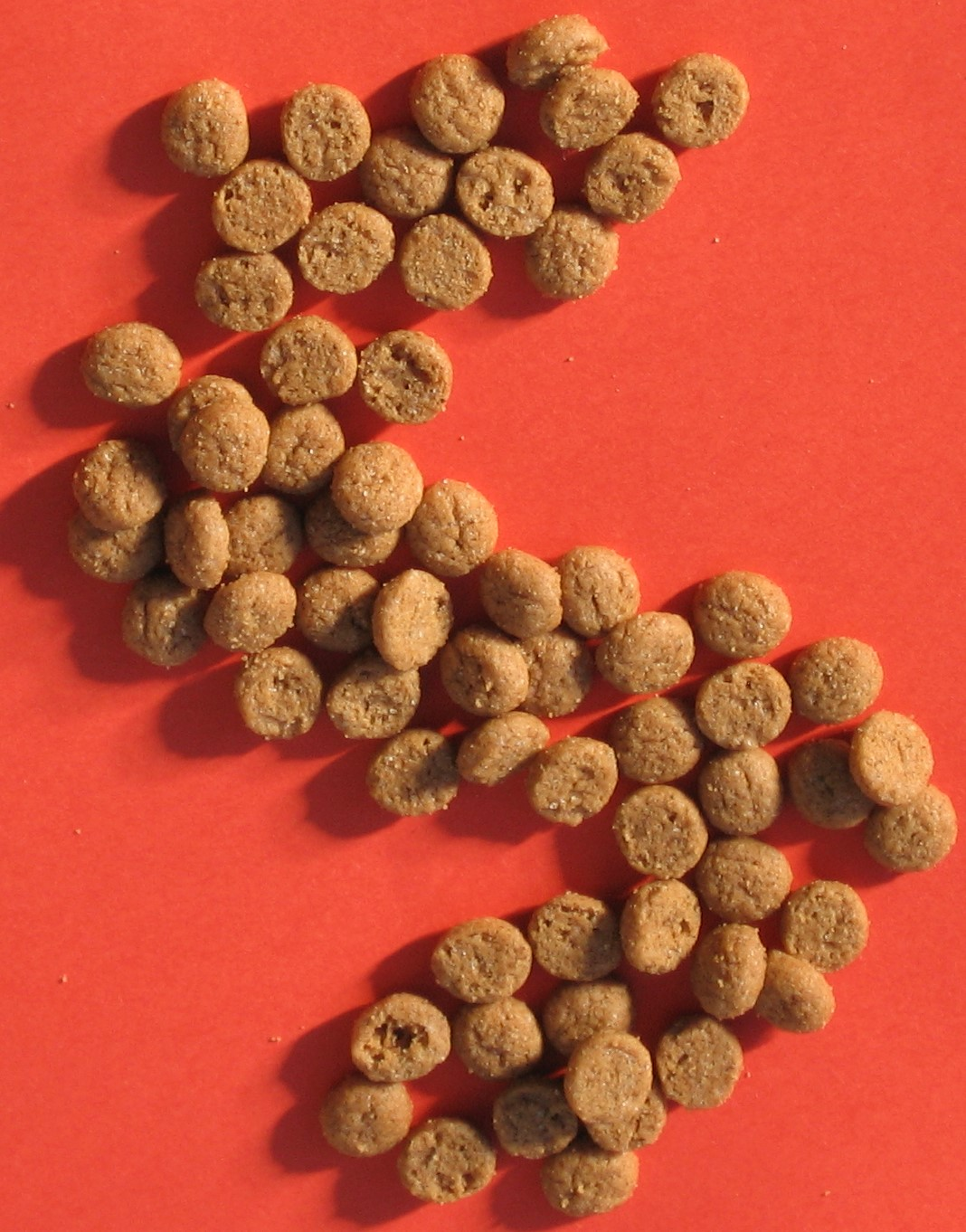
Schuddebuikjes, speculaas pieces for use as a bread topping

Schuddebuikjes are a popular product by the Dutch bread producer Bolletje, consisting of tiny round pieces of speculaas that are meant to be sprinkled on top of buttered bread.

== See also ==
- Cookie butter – Food paste made from speculoos cookie crumb
- Ginger snap – Biscuit with ginger flavor
- Kruidnoten – Dutch sweets
- Springerle – German biscuit
