= Lotus Bakeries =

Confectionery company founded in Belgium

- Type: Public
- Traded as: Euronext: LOTB
- ISIN: BE0003604155
- Industry: Food
- Founded: 1932, as "Banket- en Peperkoekbakkerij Lotus"
- Founders: Jan, Emiel and Henri Boone
- Headquarters: Lembeke, Kaprijke, Belgium
- Key people: Jan Boone (CEO)
- Revenue: 1,355,061,000 euro (2025)
- Operating income: 227,596,000 euro (2025)
- Net income: 172,269,000 euro (2025)
- Total assets: 1,536,521,000 euro (2025)
- Number of employees: 4,164 (2025)
- Website: lotusbakeries.com

Lotus Bakeries NV is a Belgian multinational snack food company founded in 1932 and based in Lembeke, East Flanders. The company's best-known product is its speculoos biscuits, branded as Biscoff (a portmanteau of "biscuit" and "coffee"). Other Lotus brands include nākd, TREK, BEAR, Kiddylicious, Peter's Yard, Dinosaurus, Peijnenburg, and Annas.

Lotus Bakeries has production facilities in Belgium, the Netherlands, France, Sweden, South Africa, and the United States. A third production facility for Biscoff is being built in Thailand and will be operational by 2026. Lotus Bakeries is active in about 70 countries in Europe, America, Asia, and Australia. The company has about 3,300 employees, and its revenue was EUR 1.23 billion for 2024.

Since 1988 shares in Lotus Bakeries have been listed on Euronext Brussels. Most are owned by the Boone and Stevens families. Jan Boone, grandson of founder Jan Boone Sr., has been the CEO since 2011.

== History ==
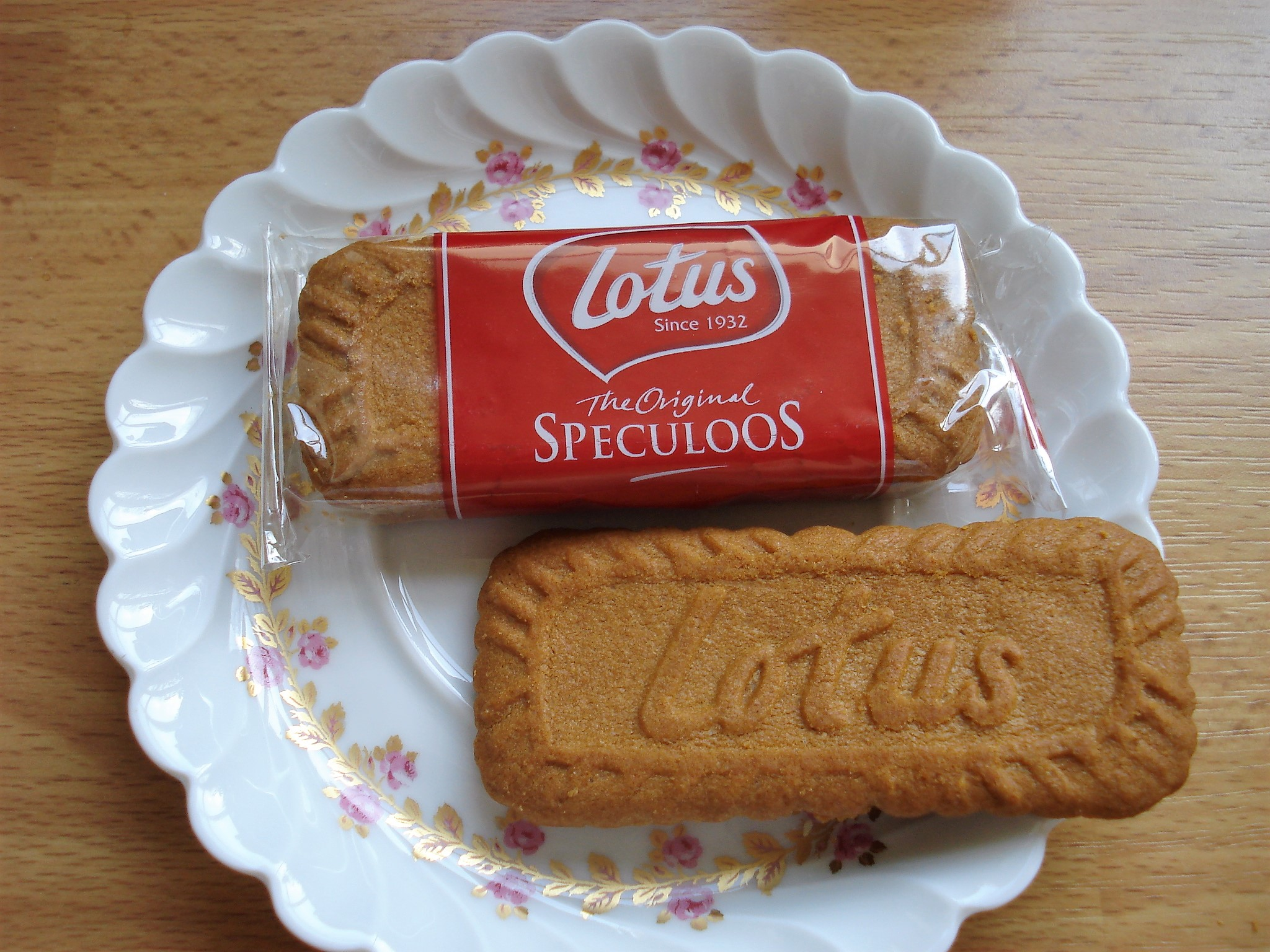
A plate of Biscoff biscuits

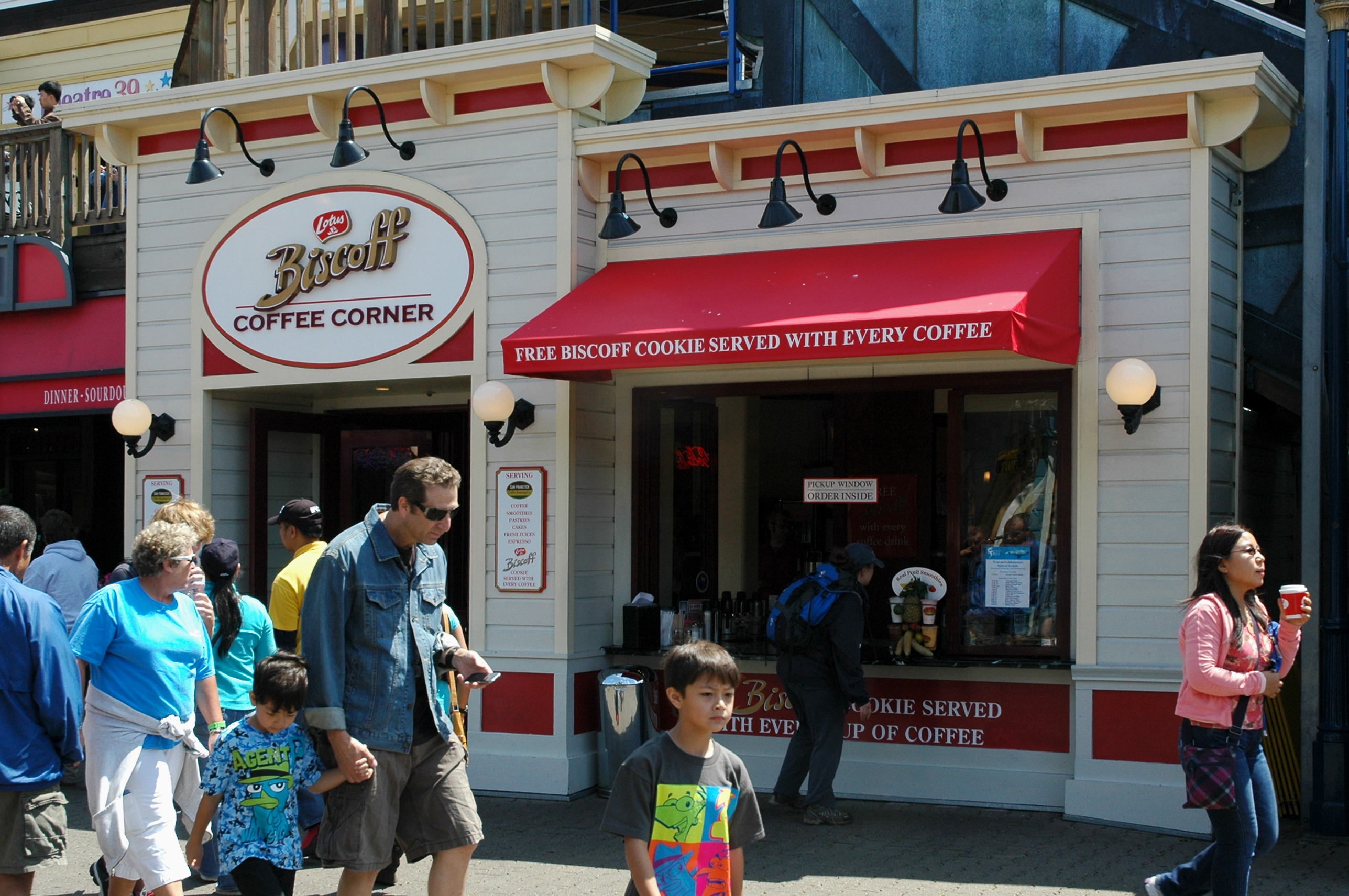
A Biscoff "coffee corner" in San Francisco, July 2011

The company was founded in Lembeke in 1932 by three brothers: Jan, Emiel, and Henri Boone. Jan named it Lotus, after the flower, which symbolizes purity.

In the 1950s, the brothers began to package their speculoos biscuits individually, and from 1956 they were offered in Belgian catering establishments alongside coffee. Soon after, in 1960, Lotus began distributing biscuits in neighboring countries. Partnering with the Stevens family in 1974, Lotus merged with Corona and now also includes cakes and pastries within its product range. Prepackaged pastries experienced rapid growth at that time.

In 1986, Lotus and Delta Air Lines struck a deal to distribute the cookies to Delta's passengers as a substitute for peanuts. A Delta employee claims to have invented the "Biscoff" name at the time, although this is disputed by Lotus. The brand was later rolled out worldwide, and several other airlines introduced the cookies.

Beginning in the 1990s, Lotus Bakeries grew steadily with a series of integrations:

- 1999: Integration of Suzy waffles
- 2006: Integration of gingerbread (Peijnenburg)
- 2008: Integration of ginger cookies (Annas)
- 2012: Acquisition of the Dinosaurus brand and start of own production from mid-2013 onwards

Since 2015, the company has become active in the natural snacking category, acquiring three British companies.

- 2015: strategic partnership with Natural Balance Foods ("NBF") in the healthy snacking segment. NBF is a British wholefood company which offers bars under the nākd and TREK brands
- 2016: acquisition of BEAR, a kids' fruit snacking brand that offers natural snacks made from fruit
- 2018: acquisition of Kiddylicious, a British baby snacking brand that creates snacks for growing babies, toddlers and preschoolers
- 2020: acquisition of the majority of the remaining shares in British company Natural Balance Foods from the founders; as a result, Lotus Bakeries has full control of the entire Natural Foods portfolio
- 2020: creation of a new International HQ for Lotus™ Natural Foods in Switzerland
- 2022: acquisition of 100% of the shares of Peter's Yard, a British artisanal sourdough company that produces sourdough crackers, crispbreads and crisps

Lotus Bakeries has invested in several production facilities on different continents:

- Historically, Biscoff was produced (and continues to be produced) in Lembeke, Belgium. In 2019, a new manufacturing facility was opened in Mebane, North Carolina, in the United States, marking the first production of Biscoff outside of Belgium. Currently, a third production facility for Biscoff is being built in Thailand and will be operational in 2026.
- Since 2019 a production facility for the group’s natural foods brand, BEAR, has been in Wolseley, South Africa. In early 2024, the nākd production facility, adjacent to the BEAR production site, was built.
- Lotus Bakeries' Local Heroes products are produced in their home markets of Belgium, the Netherlands, France, and Sweden.

== Organization ==
Karel Boone, the son of founder Jan Boone Sr., became a director in 1966 and was the CEO of Lotus Bakeries for 32 years, from 1974 to 2006. He was also, from 1966 to 2012, the president of the company for 46 years. In 2006, his brother Matthieu took over as CEO. At the end of 2011, a new generation took over with Jan Boone becoming the CEO.

=== Executive Committee ===
The Executive Committee determines the strategy and objectives of the Lotus Bakeries Group and submits them to the Board of Directors for approval.

- Jan Boone, CEO
- Isabelle Maes, CMO Lotus Bakeries & CEO Natural Foods
- Mike Cuvelier, CFO
- Ignace Heyman, COO
- John Van de Par, CPO
