= Gueze =

- Gueze or Guèze, alternative spelling of Ge'ez, an ancient Ethiopian language
- Gueze, alternative spelling of Gueuze, a type of beer
