= Gueuze =

Type of Belgian beer

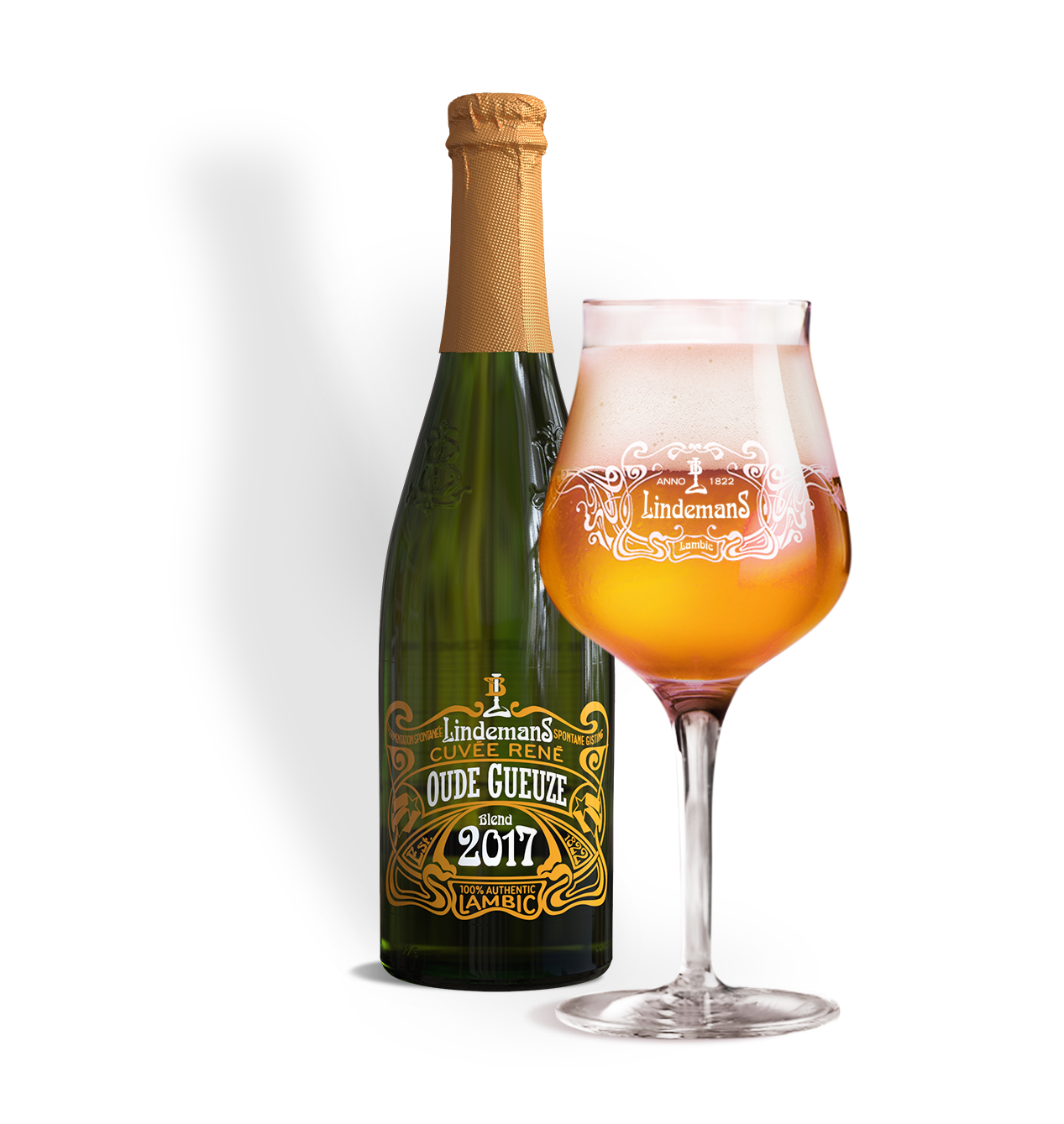
- Brouwerij Lindemans' Oude Gueuze Cuvée René
- Country of origin: Belgium (Zenne Valley, Pajottenland)
- Yeast type: Spontaneous fermentation
- Alcohol by volume: 5–9%
- Malt percentage: 60–70%

Gueuze
- Type: Beer
- Flavour: Dry, cidery, musty, sour
- Variants: Lambic
- Related products: Kriek, Framboise

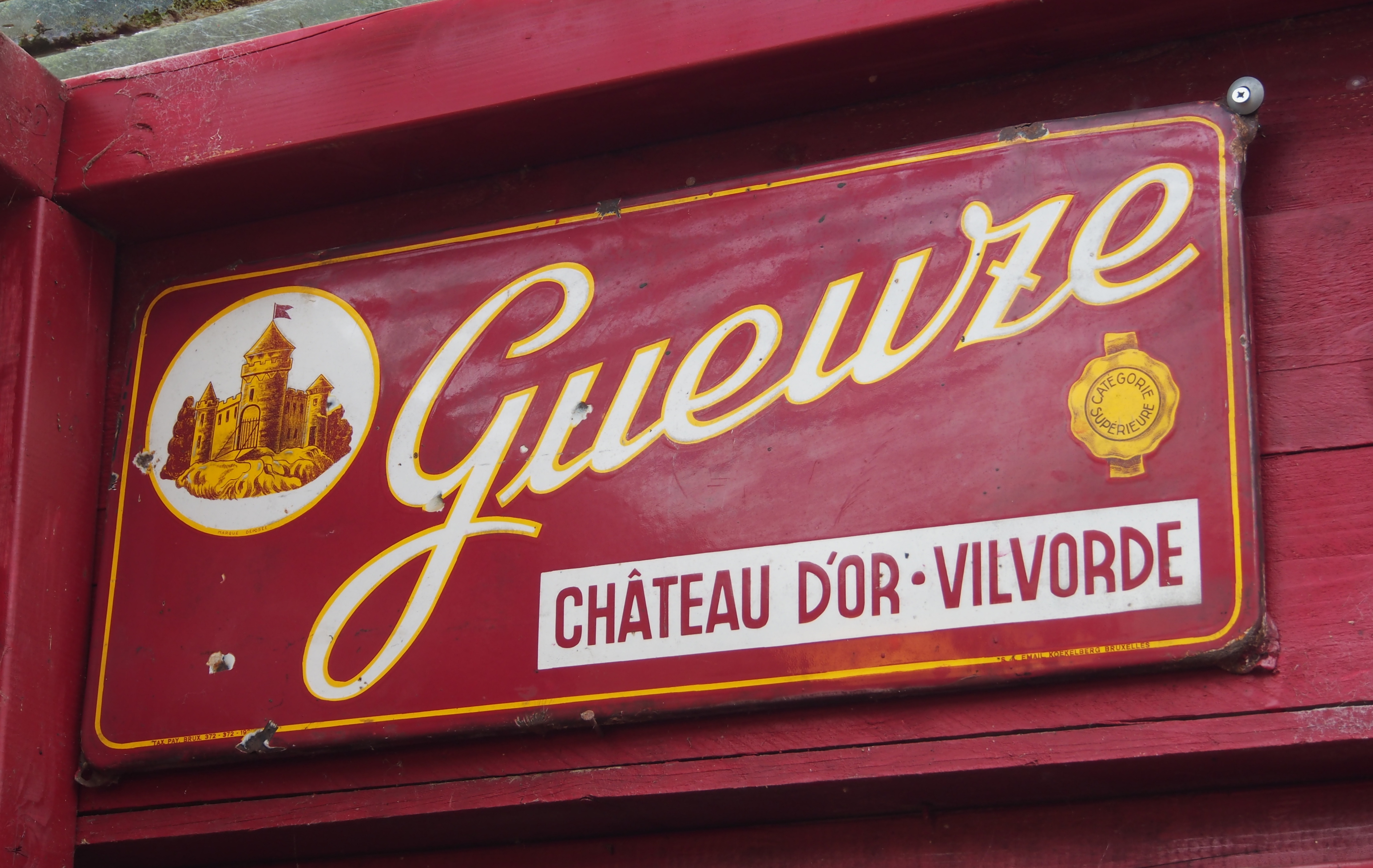
Brasserie Château d'Or produced gueuze in Vilvoorde until 1954

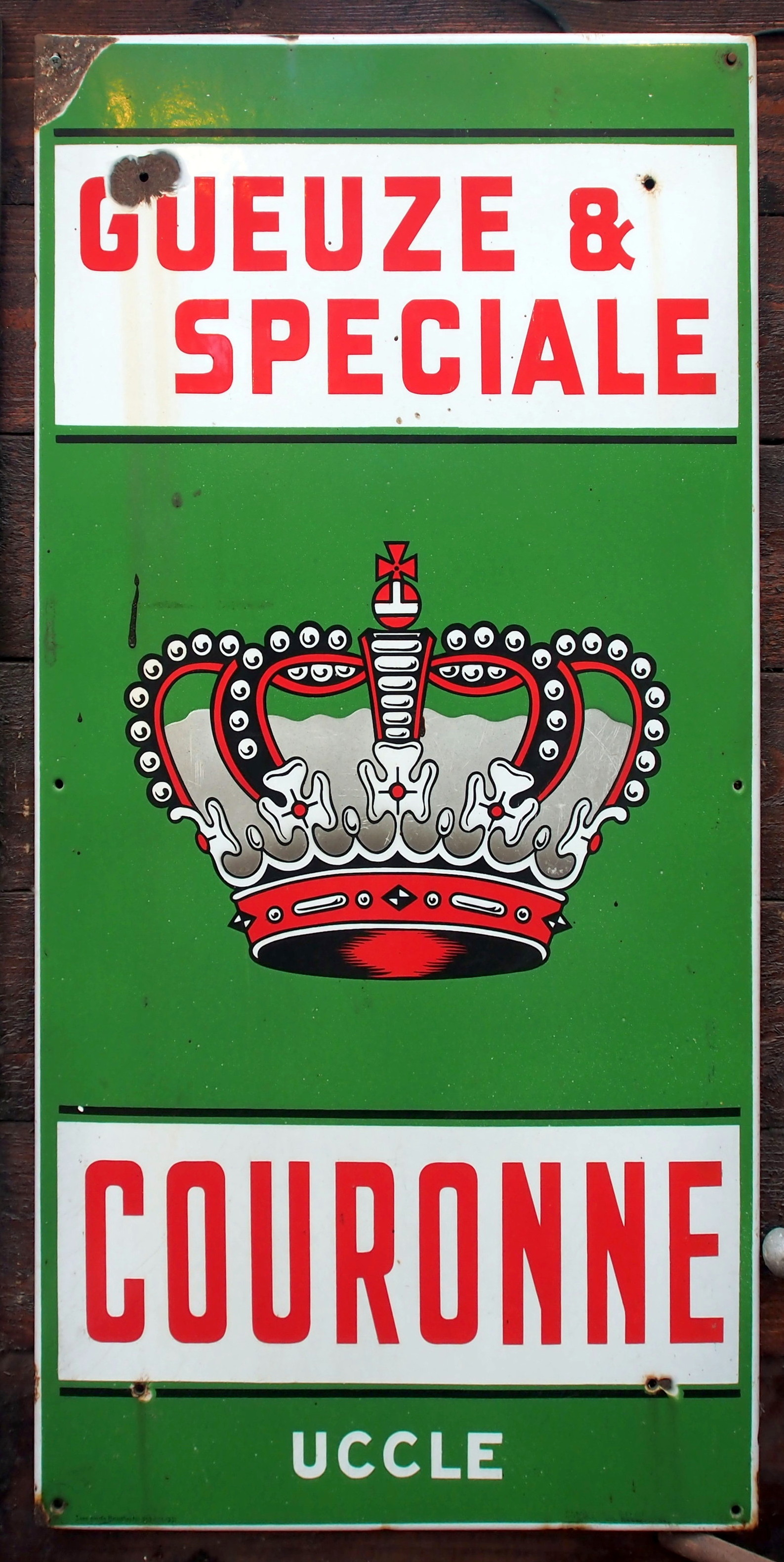
Brasserie de la Couronne, Uccle, Brussels

Gueuze (French: [ɡøz]; Dutch: geuze [ˈɣøːzə]) is a type of lambic, a Belgian beer. It is made by blending young (1-year-old) and old (2- to 3-year-old) lambics; the blend is then bottled for a second fermentation. Because the young lambics are not fully fermented, the blended beer contains fermentable sugars, which allow a second fermentation to occur.

Due to its lambic blend, gueuze has a different flavor than traditional ales and lagers. Because of the use of aged hops, lambics lack the characteristic hop aroma or flavor found in most other beers. Furthermore, the wild yeasts that are specific to lambic-style beers give gueuze a dry, cider-like, musty, sour, acetic acid, lactic acid taste. Many describe the taste as sour and "barnyard-like". Gueuze is typically highly carbonated, with carbonation levels ranging from 3.5 to 4.5 volumes of carbon dioxide. Because of its level of carbonation, gueuze is sometimes called "Brussels Champagne".

In modern times, some brewers have added sweeteners such as aspartame to their gueuzes to sweeten them, trying to make the beer more appealing to a wider audience. The original, unsweetened version is often referred to as "Oude Gueuze" ("Old Gueuze") and became more popular in the early 2000s. Tim Webb, a British writer on Belgian and other beers, comments on the correct use of the term "''Oude gueuze' or 'oude geuze', now legally defined and referring to a drink made by blending two or more 100% lambic beers."

Traditionally, gueuze is served in champagne bottles, which hold either 375 or 750 millilitres (12 3/4 or 25 1/4 US fl oz). Traditionally, gueuze, and the lambics from which it is made, have been produced in the area known as Pajottenland and in Brussels. However, some non-Pajottenland/Brussels lambic brewers have sprung up and one or two also produce gueuze – see the table below. Gueuze (both 'Oude' and others) qualified for the European Union's (EU) designation 'TSG' (Traditional Speciality Guaranteed) in 1997/98, which prescribes a registered production method and product specifications for product called "gueuze" if produced or sold in the EU, but does not have the same legally protected status as a protected designation of origin or protected geographical indication.

== Etymology ==
The name was first seen as the Dutch word 'geuze-bier' in a French text in 1829.

There is some debate on where the word gueuze originated. One theory is that it originated from geysa (geyser), Old Norse for gush, since, during times of vigorous fermentation, gueuze will spew out of the bunghole of its enclosing oak barrel. Another one derives it from a street called 'Geuzenstraet' (Geuzen Street) in Brussels, an old street that used to host the former entrance of "La Bécasse" pub (the street is now erased; it was next to Rue de Tabora).

Another theory derives it from the French word 'gueuse' (meaning pig iron or raw iron), as originally, gueuze was defined as raw (unblended), aged, but fine-tasting lambic.

== Méthode Traditionnelle ==
Some American craft breweries have begun blending young and old sour beers, to produce their own versions of the traditional gueuze. In 2016 Jester King Brewery released a blended, spontaneously fermented beer which it labelled as "Méthode Gueuze." However, the High Council for Artisanal Lambic Beers (HORAL) objected to the name, and the two parties arranged a meeting in Belgium. Jester King Brewery had no status to represent other American brewers in this meeting, and American brewers were not bound by any agreements made by Jester King's representatives. HORAL and Jester King agreed that Jester King would use the designation "Méthode Traditionelle" as a style name in the future. Jester King invited other American brewers to use the Méthode Traditionelle designation for their gueuze-style beers, and proposed a set of standards and a logo for Méthode Traditionelle beers. The Méthode Traditionelle designation has not caught on among American brewers, being used only by Jester King and TRVE Brewing, and causing confusion not only with the Méthode Traditionelle used by French champagne makers and Languedoc-Roussillon wine makers, but also among American craft and home brewers making highly carbonated beer in the using the champagne-makers' traditional method.

== Commercial production of Gueuze ==
Commercial production of gueuze commenced in the 19th century; modern breweries that produce gueuze include:

- 3 Fonteinen
- Boon
- Belle-Vue
- Cantillon
- De Cam
- Girardin
- Hanssens
- Lindemans
- Mort Subite
- Oud Beersel
- De Troch
- Tilquin
- Timmermans

== Oude Gueuze breweries and beers ==
=== Pajottenland, Senne Valley and Brussels ===
- 3 Fonteinen (Beersel)
  - Oude Geuze (6%)
  - Oude Geuze Cuvée Armand & Gaston (5.5%)
  - Oude Geuze Golden Blend (7.2%)
  - Oude Geuze Platinum Blend (6.9%)
  - Zenne y Frontera (7%)
- Angerik (Dilbeek)
  - Cuvée Kluysbosch (6.0%)
- Belle-Vue (Sint-Pieters-Leeuw)
  - Belle-Vue Gueuze (5.5%)
- Boon (Lembeek)
  - Mariage parfait Oude Geuze (8%)
  - Moriau Oude Gueuze (7%)
  - Oude Gueuze Boon (7%)
  - Oude Geuze Boon Black Label (7%)
  - various limited edition gueuzes
- Brussels Beer Project (Anderlecht)
  - Gueuze Dansaert (7%)
- Cantillon (Anderlecht)
  - Gueuze 100% lambic (5%)
  - Lou Pepe Gueuze (5%)
- De Cam (Gooik)
  - Oude Gueuze (6.5%)
- Den Herberg (Buizingen)
  - Oude Geuze Devillé (6.7%)
- De Troch (Wambeek)
  - Chapeau Gueuze (3.5%)
  - "Oude Gueuze" Cuvee (5.5%)
- De Koninck (Dworp)
  - Dekoninck Gueuze (6%) (produced in collaboration with Boon)
- Eylenbosch (Zellik)
  - Oude Gueuze (5.8%)
- Girardin (Sint-Ulriks-Kapelle)
  - 1882 Geuze black label (5%)
  - 1882 Geuze white label (5%)
- Hanssens (Dworp)
  - Oude Geuze (6%)
  - Gueuze Extra (6%)
- Lambiek Fabriek (Sint-Pieters-Leeuw) (Lambic is brewed in other breweries)
  - Oude Geuze Bret-elle (6,3%)
  - Organic Geuze Natur-elle (6,2%)
- Lindemans (Vlezenbeek)
  - Cuvée René Oude Gueuze (5.5%)
- Mort Subite (Kobbegem)
  - Oude Gueuze Lambic (7%)
- Oud Beersel (Beersel)
  - Oude Gueuze (6%)
- Timmermans (Itterbeek)
  - Oude Gueuze (5.5%)
- Tilquin (Rebecq)
  - Oude Gueuze Tilquin (7%)

=== Outside of traditional origin ===
- Van Honsebrouck
  - St. Louis Gueuze Fond Tradition (5%)
  - St. Louis Premium Gueuze (4.5%)

== Gallery of Oude Gueuze producers ==
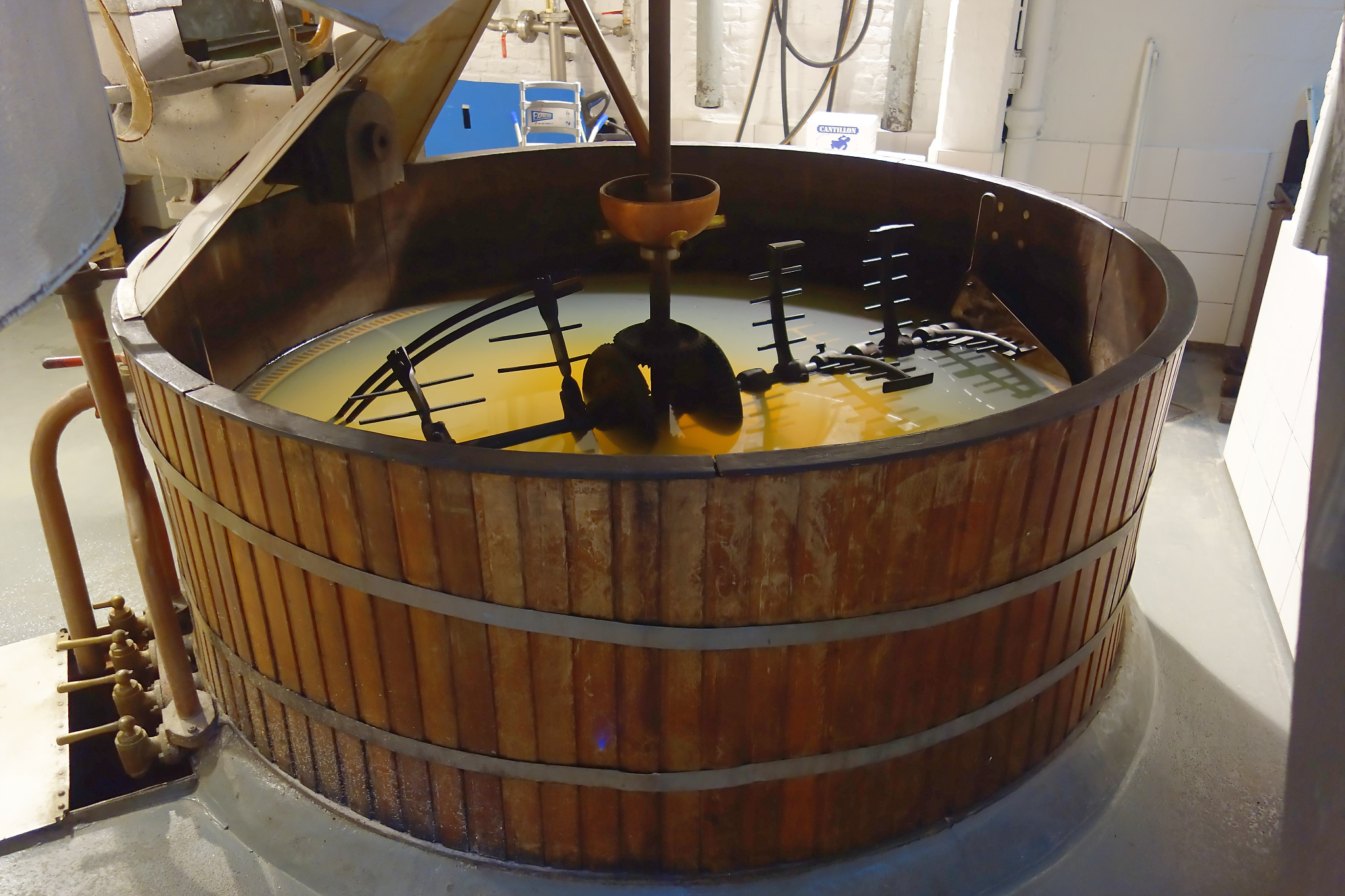
Cantillon
Anderlecht

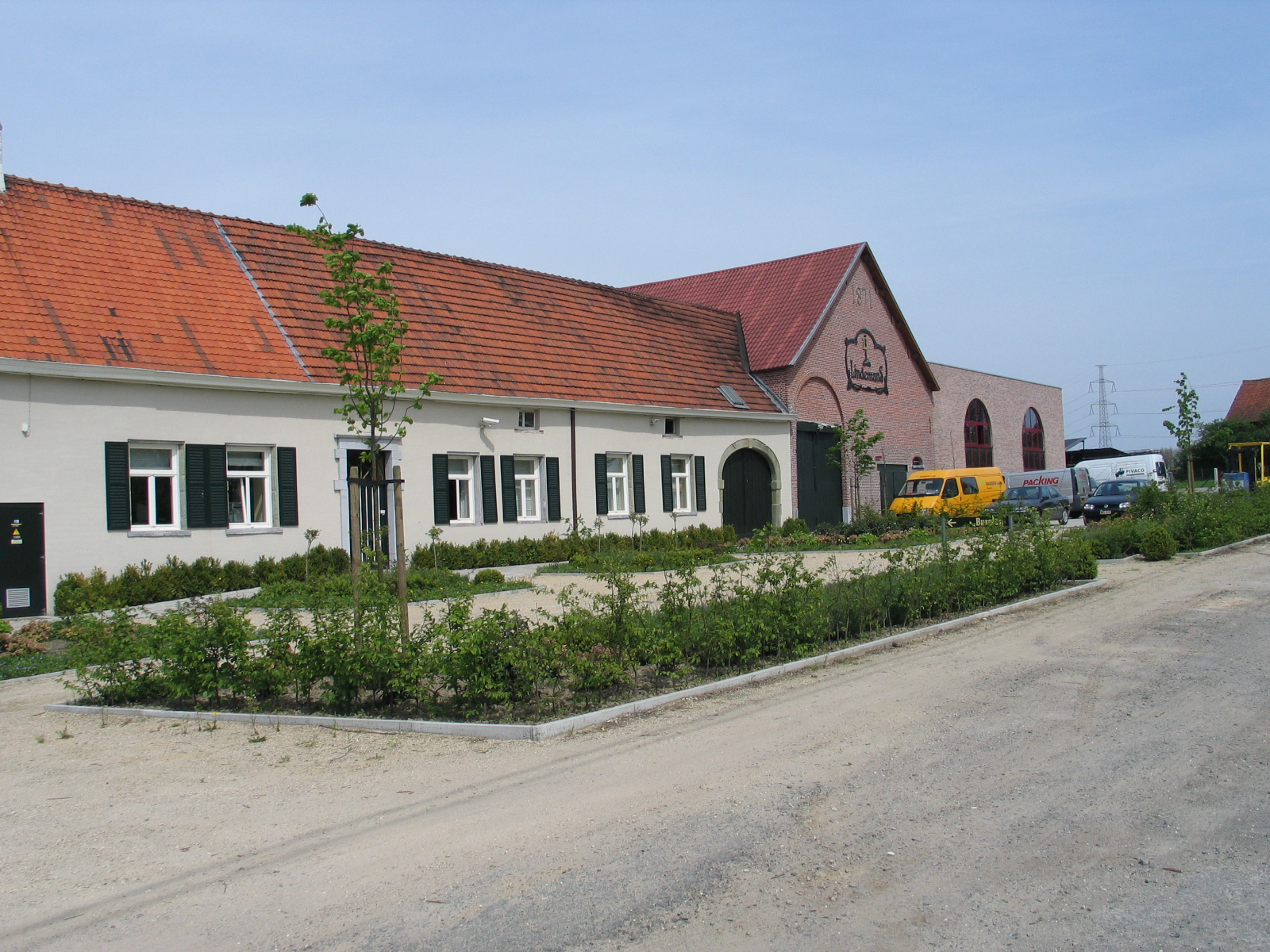
Lindemans
Vlezenbeek

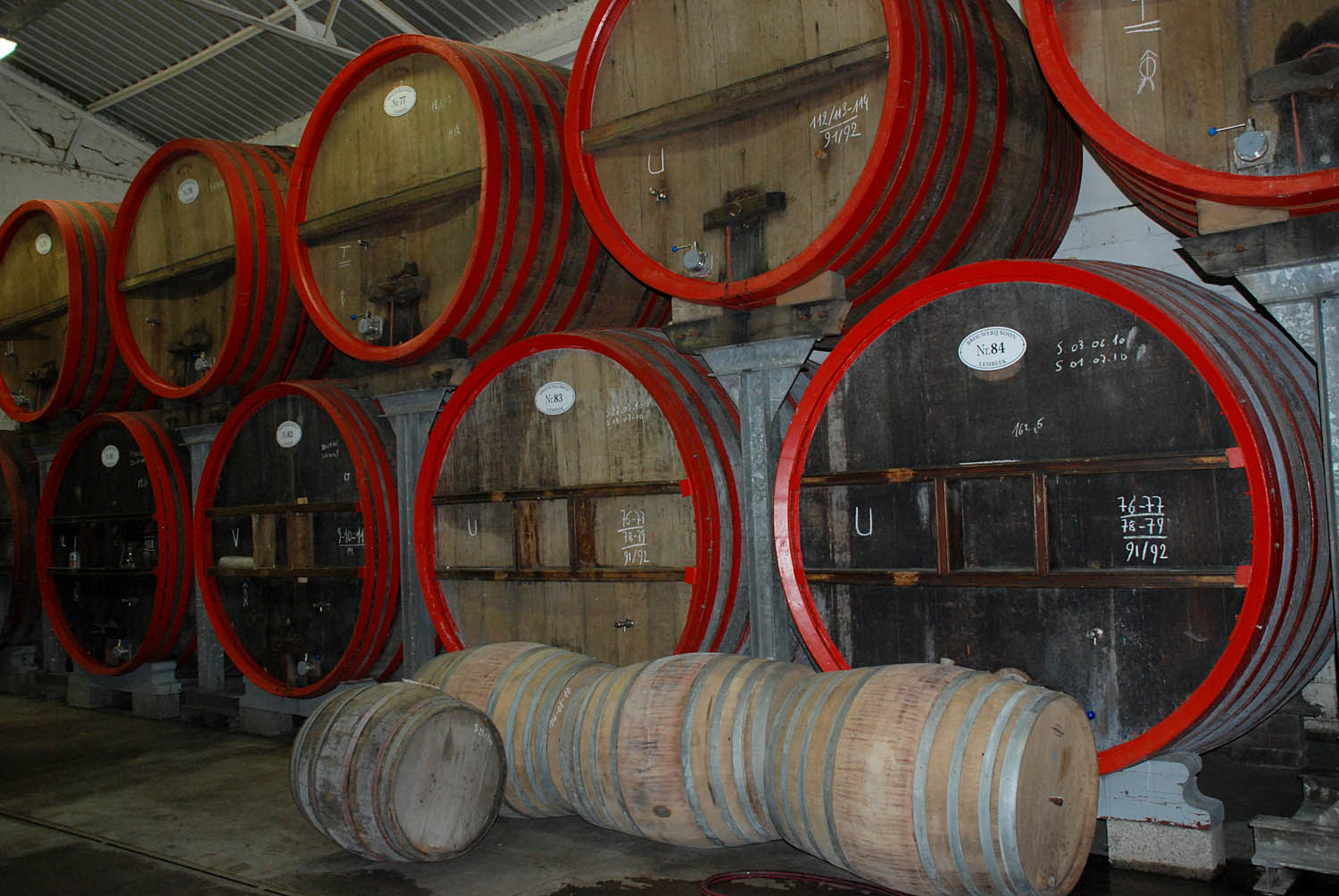
Boon
Lembeek

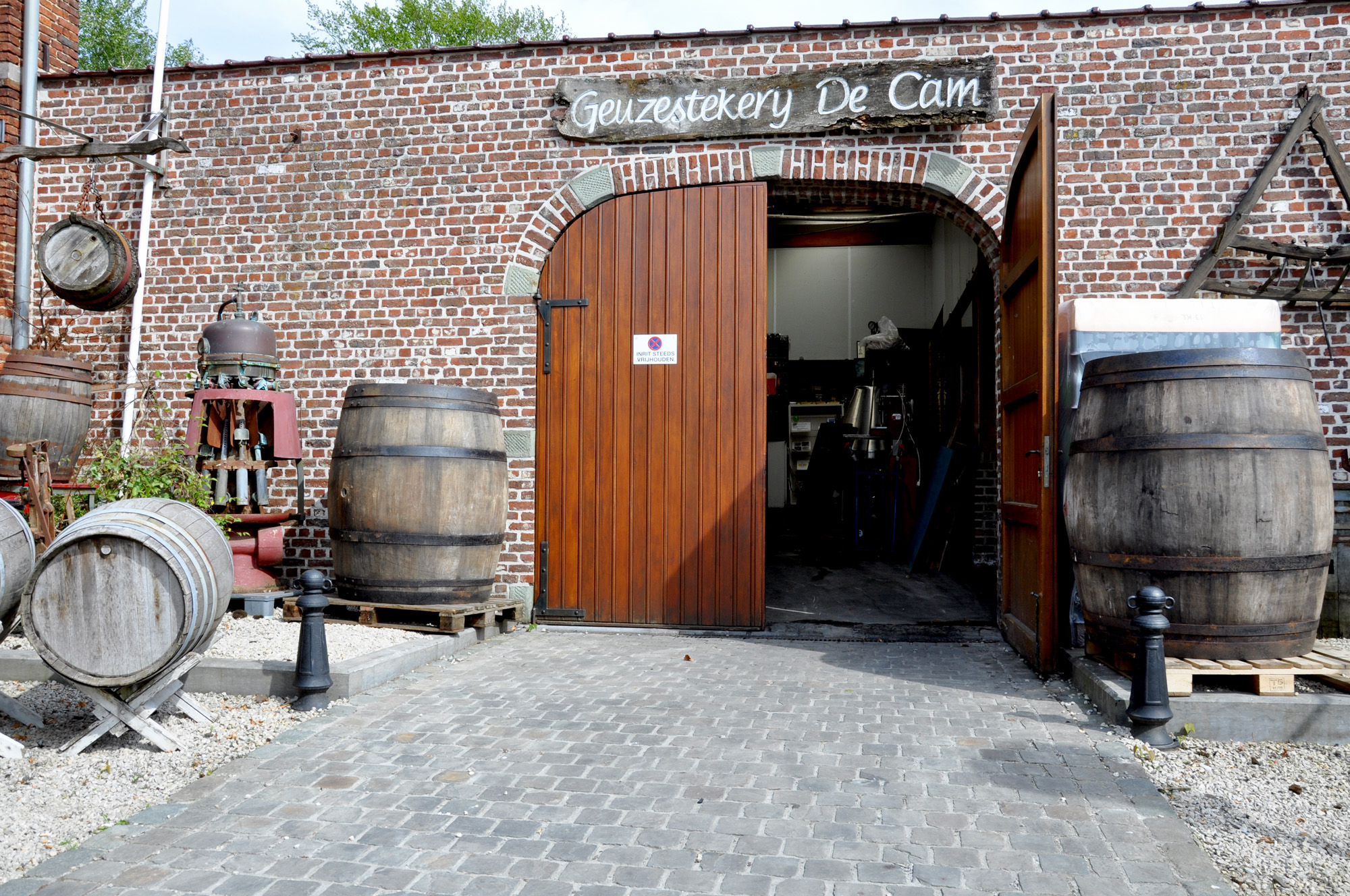
Geuzestekerij De Cam
Gooik

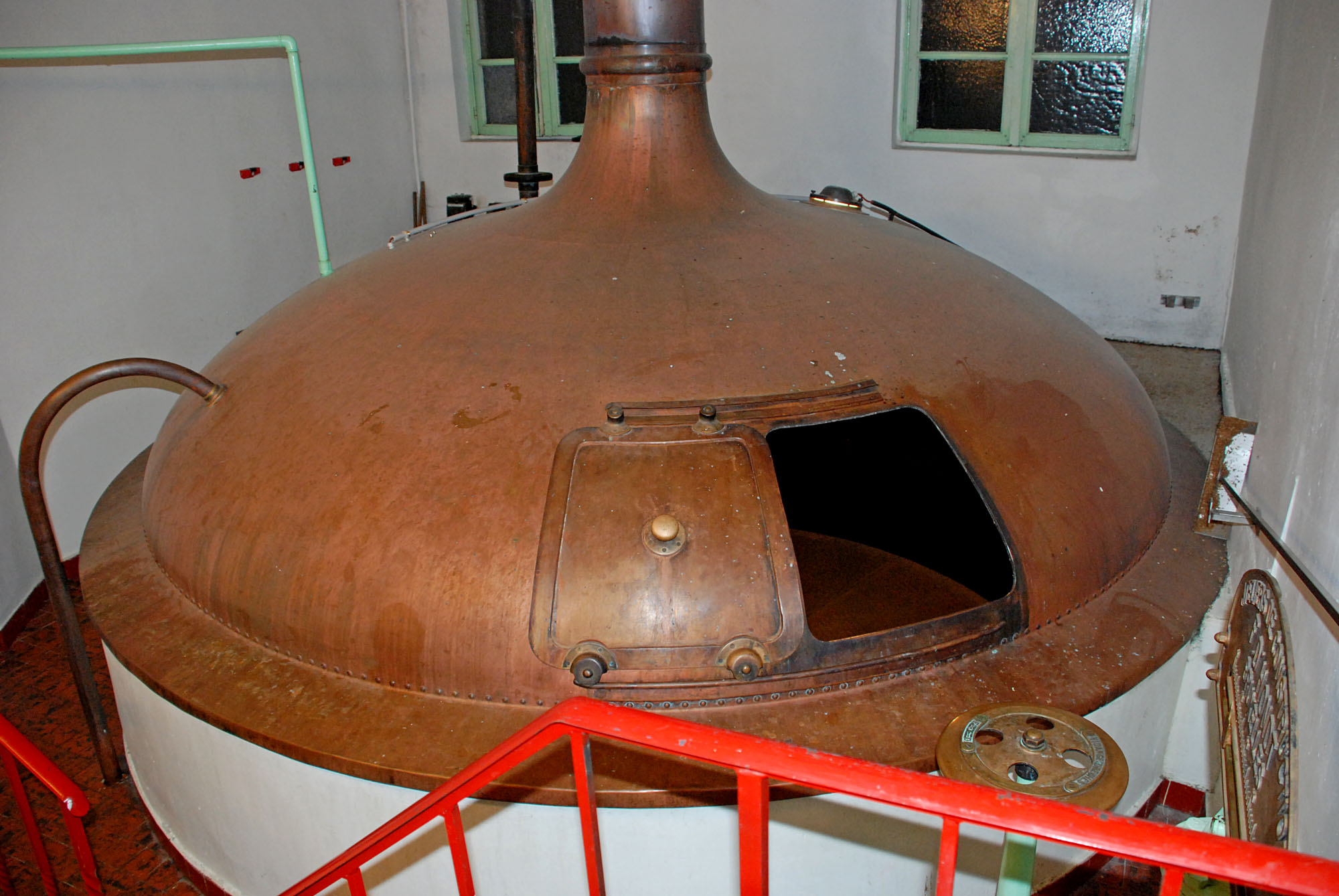
Timmermans
Itterbeek

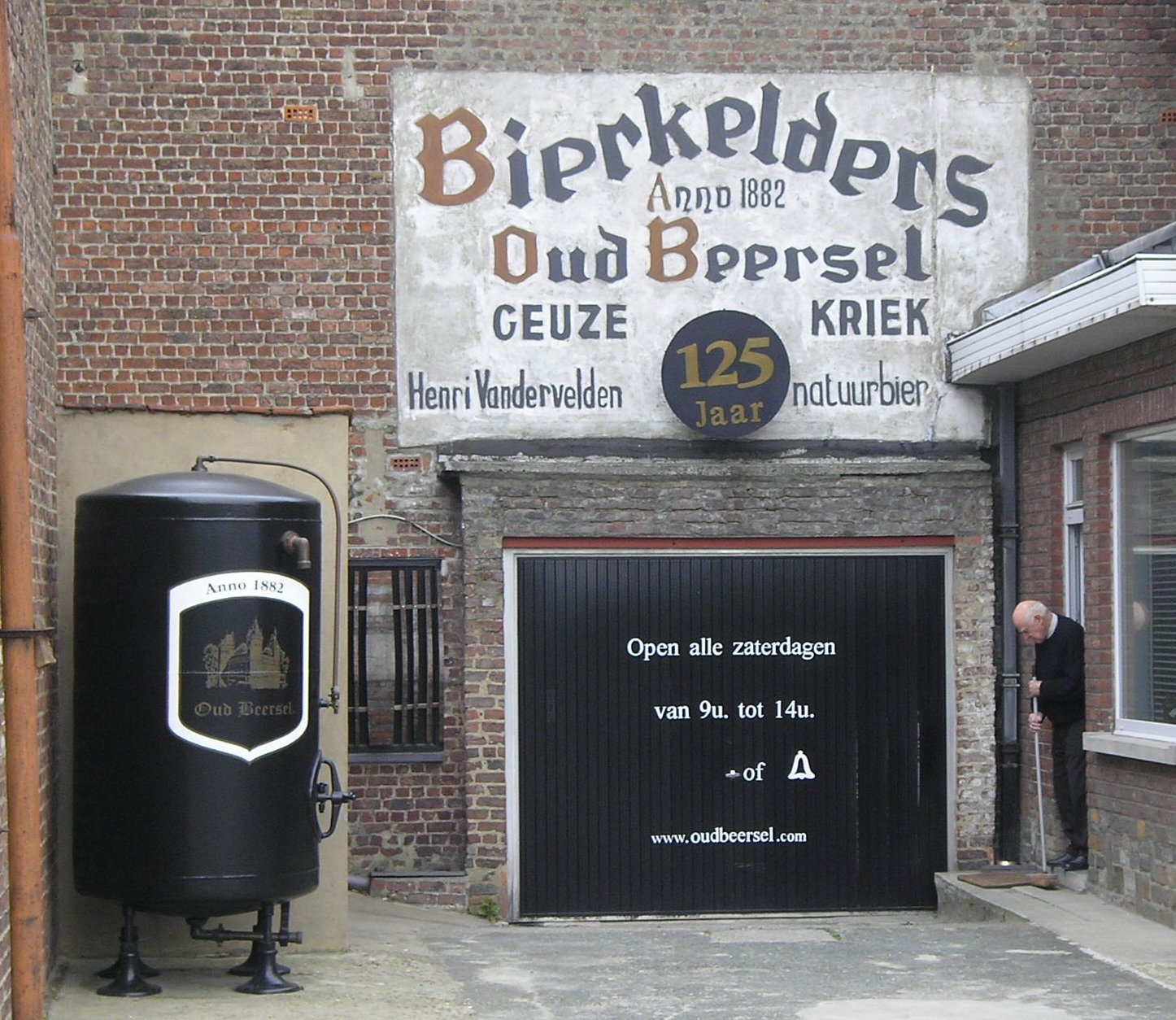
Oud Beersel
Beersel

== See also ==
- HORAL
- Sour beer
- Barrel-aged beer

== Bibliography ==
- Jackson, Michael (1998). Michael Jackson's great beers of Belgium (3rd ed.). Philadelphia: Running Press. p. 343. ISBN 9780762404032.
- Protz, Roger (2005). 300 beers to try before you die!. St. Albans: Campaign for Real Ale. p. 304. ISBN 978-1852492137.
- Proz, Roger (2000). The taste of beer. London: Seven Dials. p. 256. ISBN 9781841880662.
