= Sour beer =

Beer with a tart or sour taste

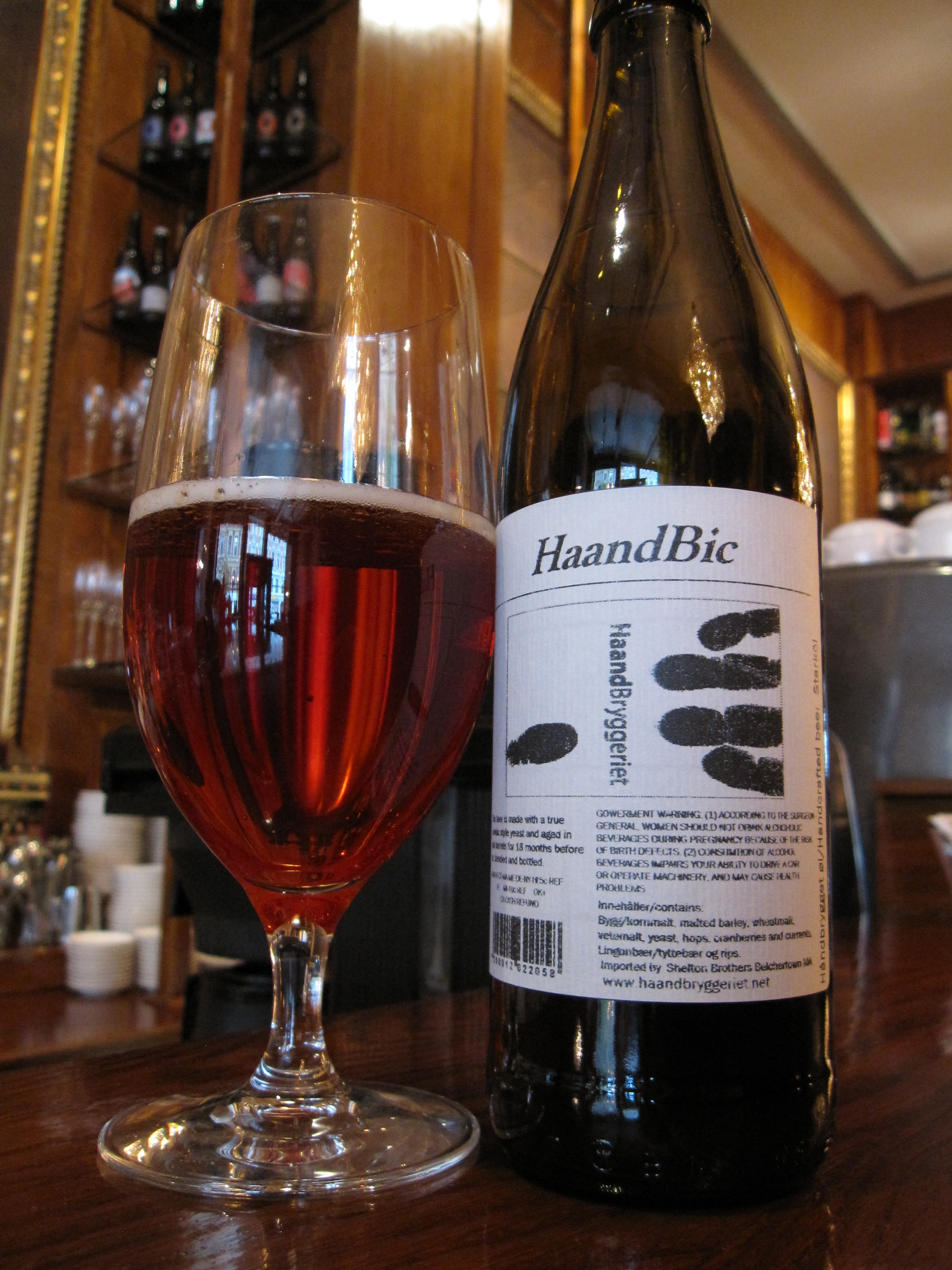
Norwegian sour beer aged for eighteen months in oak barrels with Lambic microbes

Sour beer is beer which has an intentionally acidic, tart, or sour taste. Sour beer styles include Belgian lambics, Flanders red ale, German Gose, and Berliner Weisse.

== Brewing ==
Unlike modern brewing, which is done in a sanitary environment to guard against the intrusion of wild yeast, historically the starter used from one batch to another usually contained some wild yeast and bacteria. Sours are made by intentionally allowing wild yeast strains or bacteria into the brew, traditionally through the barrels or during the cooling of the wort in a coolship open to the outside air.

The most common microbes used to intentionally sour beer are the bacteria Lactobacillus and Pediococcus, while the fungus Brettanomyces can also add some acidity. Another method for achieving a tart flavor is adding fruit, which directly contributes organic acids such as citric acid. Additionally, acid can be directly added to beer or added by the use of unusually large amounts of acidulated malt.

Depending on the process employed, the uncertainty involved in using wild yeast may cause the beer to take months to ferment and potentially years to mature. However, modern kettle souring methods allow sour beer to be created within a typical timeframe for ales, usually several days.

== Sour beer styles ==
While any type of beer may be soured, most follow traditional or standardized guidelines.

=== American wild ale ===
Beers brewed in the United States utilize yeast and bacteria strains instead of or in addition to standard brewers yeasts. These microflora may be cultured or acquired spontaneously, and the beer may be fermented in a number of different types of brewing vessels. American wild ales tend not to have specific parameters or guidelines stylistically, but instead simply refer to the use of unusual yeasts.

=== Berliner Weisse ===
At one time the most popular alcoholic beverage in Berlin, this is a somewhat weaker (usually around 3% abv) beer made sour by use of Lactobacillus bacteria. This type of beer is usually served with flavored syrups to balance the tart flavor.

=== Flanders red ale ===
Flanders red ales are fermented with organisms other than Saccharomyces cerevisiae (brewers yeast), especially Lactobacillus, then placed into oak barrels to age and mature. Usually, the mature beer is blended with younger beer to adjust the taste for consistency. This is also sometimes referred to as "flemish red".

=== Gose ===
Gose is a top-fermenting beer that originated in Goslar, Germany. This style is characterized by the use of coriander and salt and is made sour by inoculating the wort with lactic acid bacteria before primary fermentation.

=== Lambic ===
Lambic is a spontaneously fermented beer made in the Pajottenland region around Brussels, Belgium. Wort is left to cool overnight in the koelschip where it is exposed to the open air during the winter and spring, and placed into barrels to ferment and mature. Most lambics are blends of several seasons’ batches, such as gueuze, or are secondarily fermented with fruits, such as kriek and framboise. As such, pure unblended lambic is quite rare, and few bottled examples exist.

=== Oud bruin ===
Originating from the Flemish region of Belgium, oud bruins are differentiated from the Flanders red ale in that they are darker in color and not aged on wood. As such this style tends to use cultured yeasts to impart its sour notes.

== Gallery of European sour beer styles ==
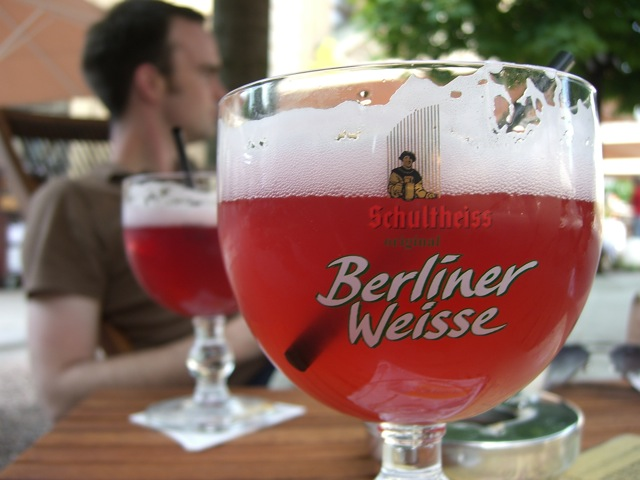
Berliner Weisse
Schultheiss
Berlin, Germany

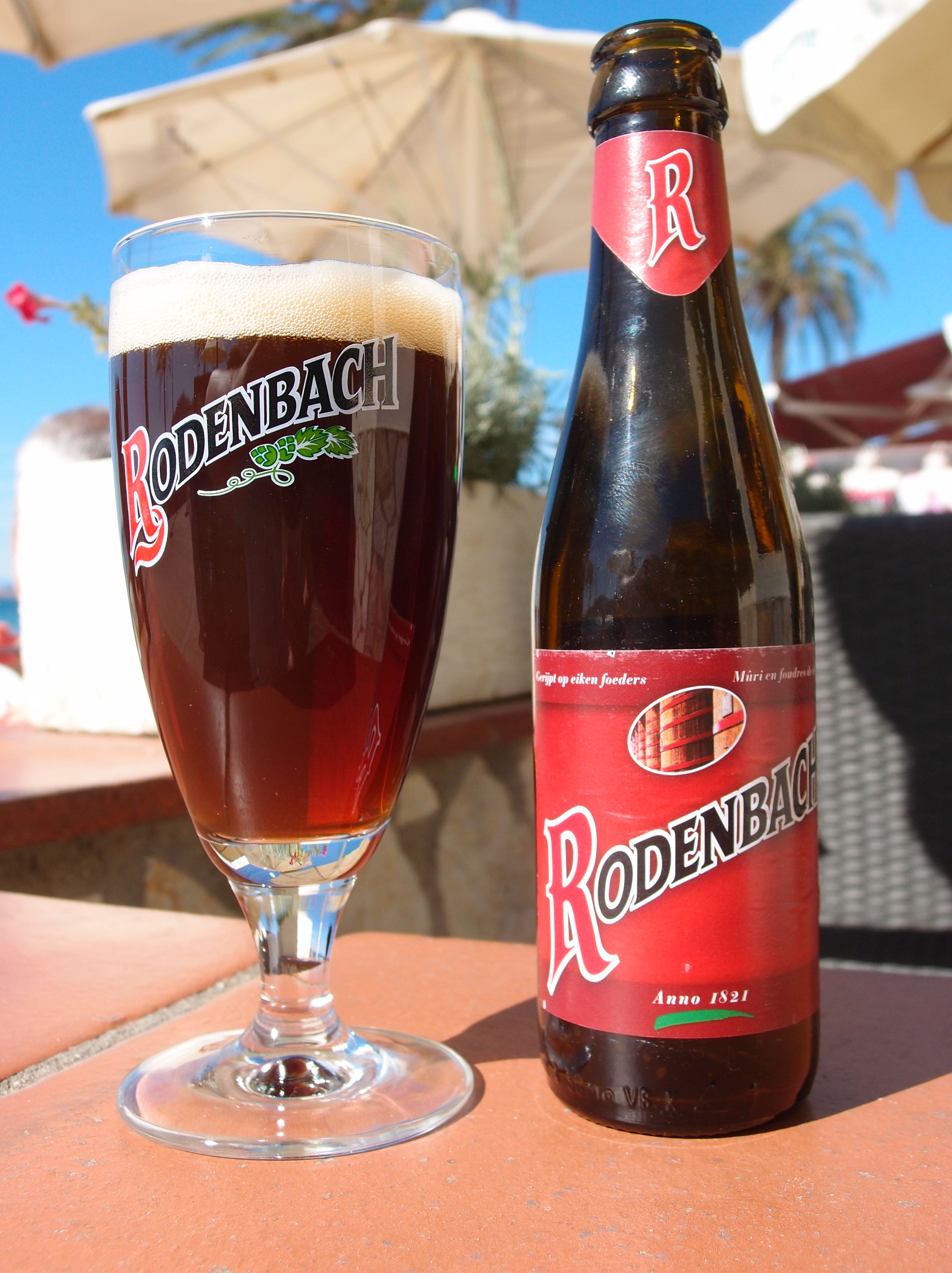
Flanders red ale
Rodenbach
Roeselare, Belgium

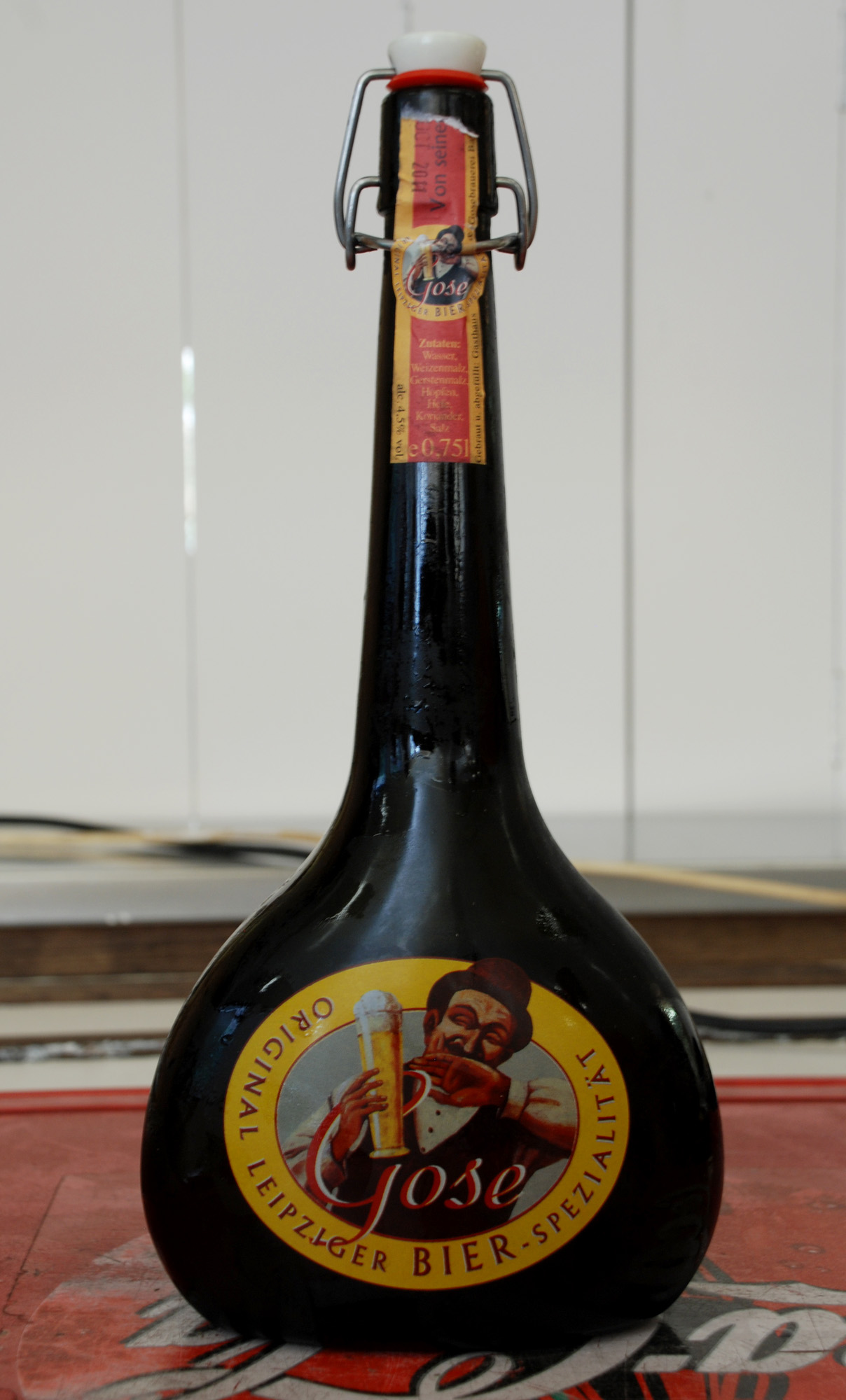
Gose
Bayerischer Bahnhof
Leipzig, Germany

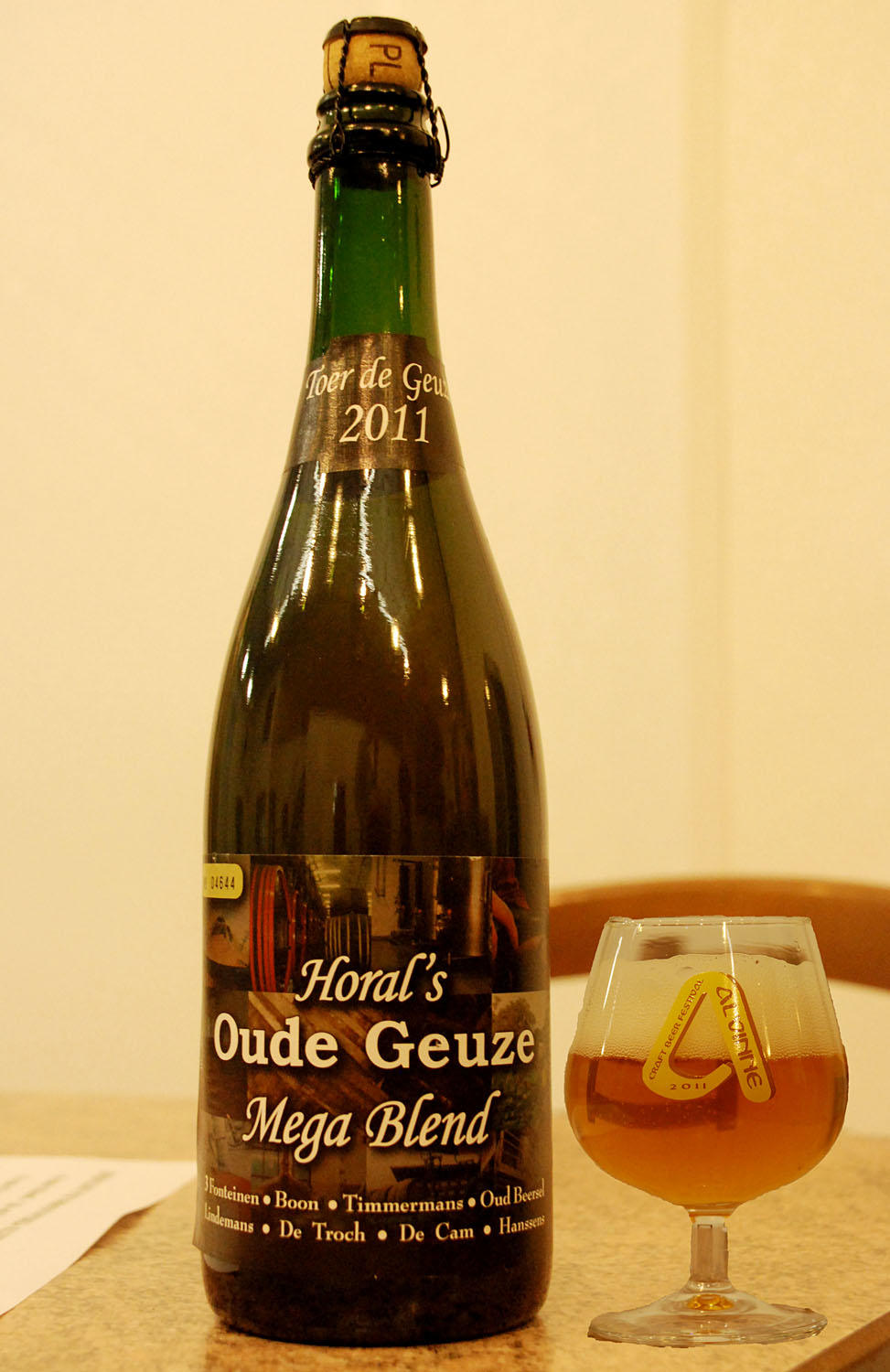
Oude Geuze
Horal's Mega Blend
Belgium

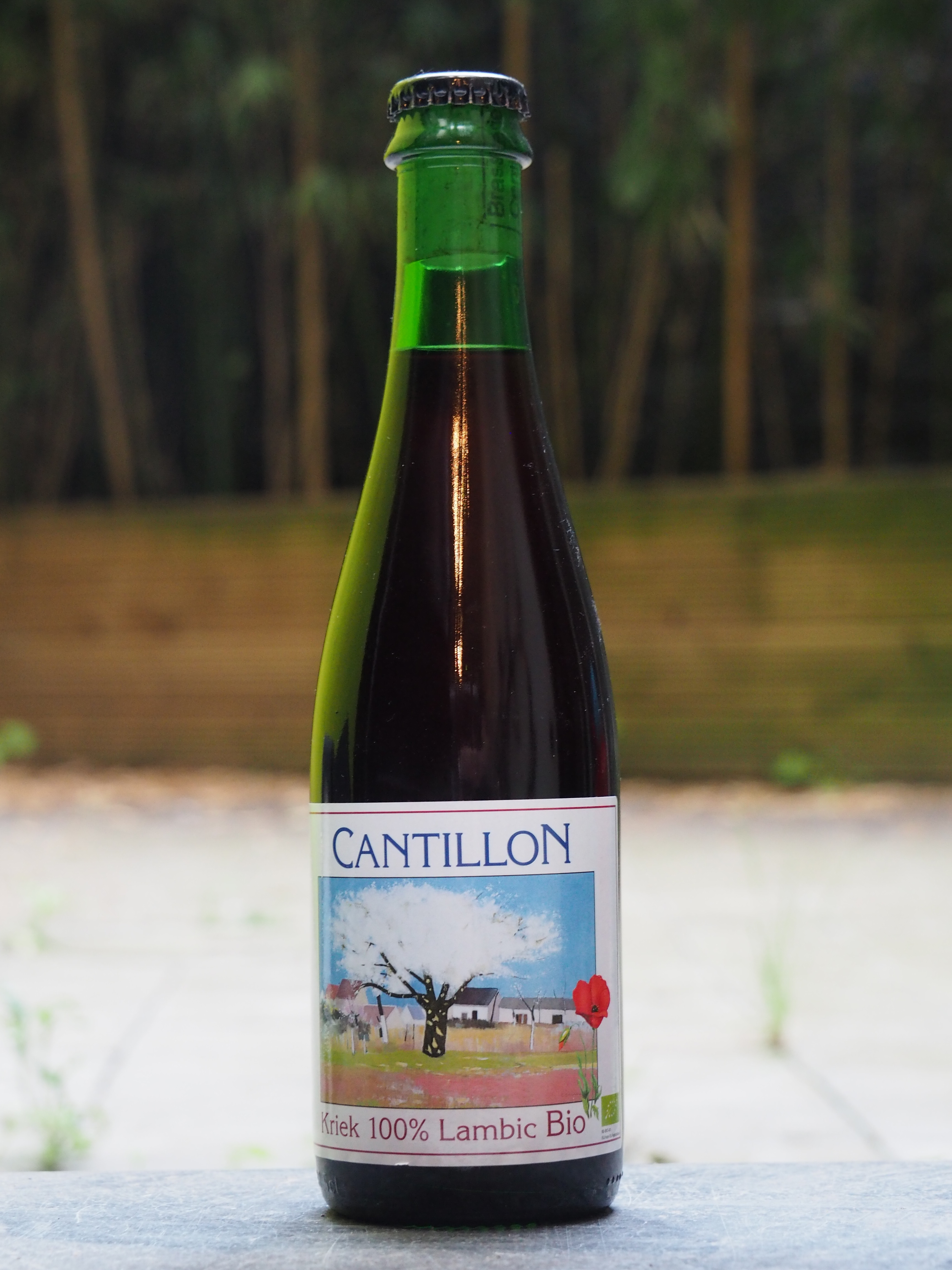
Kriek lambic
Cantillon
Anderlecht, Belgium

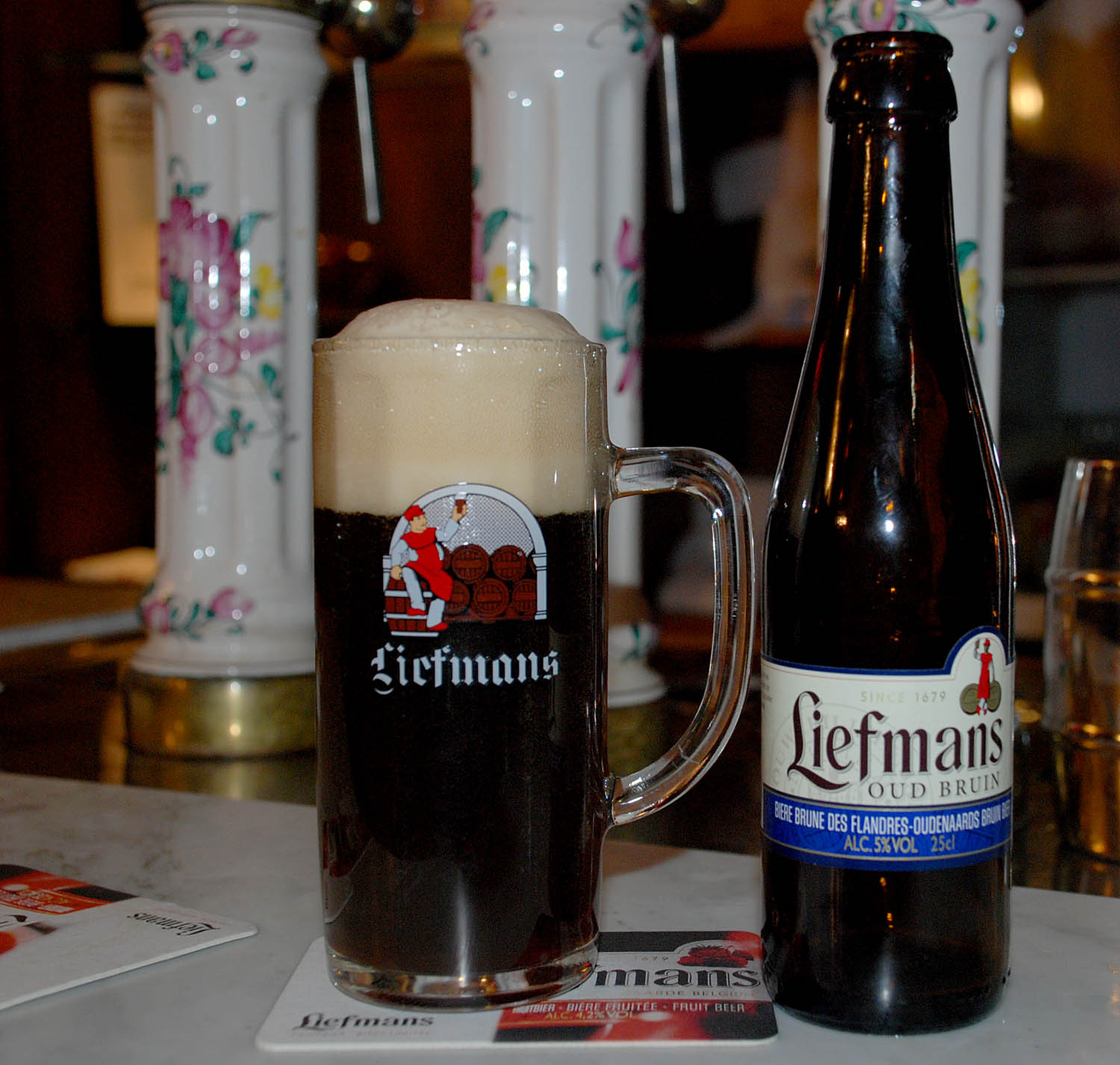
Oud bruin
Liefmans
Oudenaarde, Belgium

== See also ==
- Barrel-aged beer
