= 3 Fonteinen =

Belgian brewery

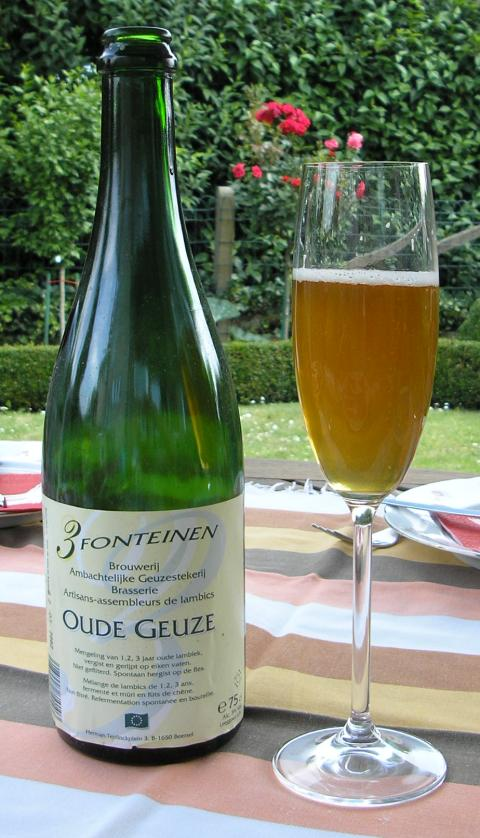
A bottle of 3 Fonteinen Oude Geuze.

3 Fonteinen is a Belgian brewery, specialized in geuze and kriek. The brewery is situated in Beersel, near Brussels and produces classic versions of both kriek and geuze.

== Geuzestekerij ==
3 Fonteinen was founded in 1887 as a café and geuzestekerij, a place where geuze is produced by blending old and new lambics, acquired from other breweries. The enterprise was bought by Gaston De Belder in 1953, who expanded it with a restaurant and left it to his sons Armand and Guido in 1982.

In 1998, a brewery installation was bought. Apart from using its own lambic, 3 Fonteinen uses lambic made by Boon, Girardin and Lindemans for its geuze. 3 Fonteinen is one of the few remaining geuzestekerijen.

The Mijol Club, a literary club, founded by Herman Teirlinck, used to convene in the café.

In May 2009, a faulty thermostat caused 3000 bottles to explode. The remaining overheated geuze was made into an eau de vie called "Armand's Spirit", the sales of which enough allowed the brewery to continue operations.

In March 2013, after four years of interruption, Brewery 3 Fonteinen inaugurated its new brewing installation and is brewing its own lambic again. During the four years without its own installation 3 Fonteinen managed to keep its head above water by blending lambic that they bought from nearby lambic breweries like Boon and Girardin.
