= Sint-Pieters-Leeuw =

Sint-Pieters-Leeuw: Leeuw-Saint-Pierre (French)
- Municipality
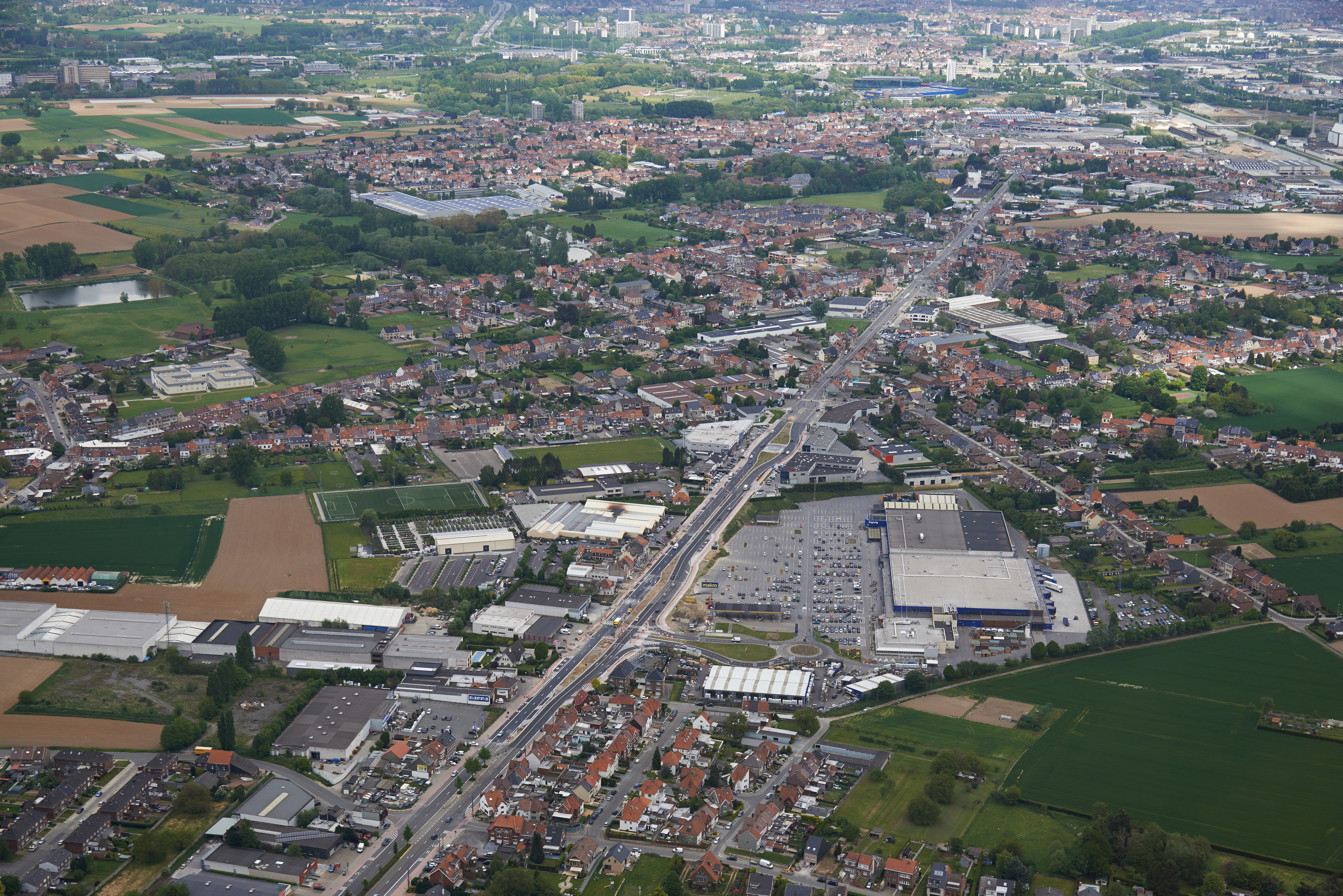

- Flag Coat of arms

- The municipality in the Halle-Vilvoorde arrondissement in the province of Flemish Brabant
- Interactive map of Sint-Pieters-Leeuw
- Location in Belgium
- Coordinates: 50°47′N 04°15′E
- Country: Belgium
- Community: Flemish Community
- Region: Flemish Region
- Province: Flemish Brabant
- Arrondissement: Halle-Vilvoorde

Government
  - Mayor: Jan Desmeth (N-VA)
  - Governing parties: N-VA, CD&V

Area
  - Total: 40.67 km^{2} (15.70 sq mi)

Population (2018-01-01)
  - Total: 34,038
  - Density: 836.9/km^{2} (2,168/sq mi)
- Postal codes: 1600-1602
- NIS code: 23077
- Area codes: 02
- Website: www.sint-pieters-leeuw.be

Sint-Pieters-Leeuw (Dutch pronunciation: [sɪnt ˌpitərs ˈleːu]; French: Leeuw-Saint-Pierre, pronounced [lø sɛ̃ pjɛʁ]) is a municipality in the province of Flemish Brabant, in the Flemish region of Belgium.

The municipality comprises the towns of Oudenaken, Ruisbroek, Sint-Laureins-Berchem, Sint-Pieters-Leeuw proper and Vlezenbeek. Sint-Pieters-Leeuw is located just outside the Brussels-Capital Region, in the Payottenland. The municipality is a blend of parks, castles, meadows and gardens with the Coloma park as its green heart.

On 1 January 2018, Sint-Pieters-Leeuw had a total population of 34,025. The total area is 40.38 km^{2} (15.59 sq mi), which gives a population density of 842/km^{2} (2,180/sq mi). It is a mostly a residential community with largely preserved rural areas and some industrial zones. The official language of Sint-Pieters-Leeuw is Dutch.

== History ==
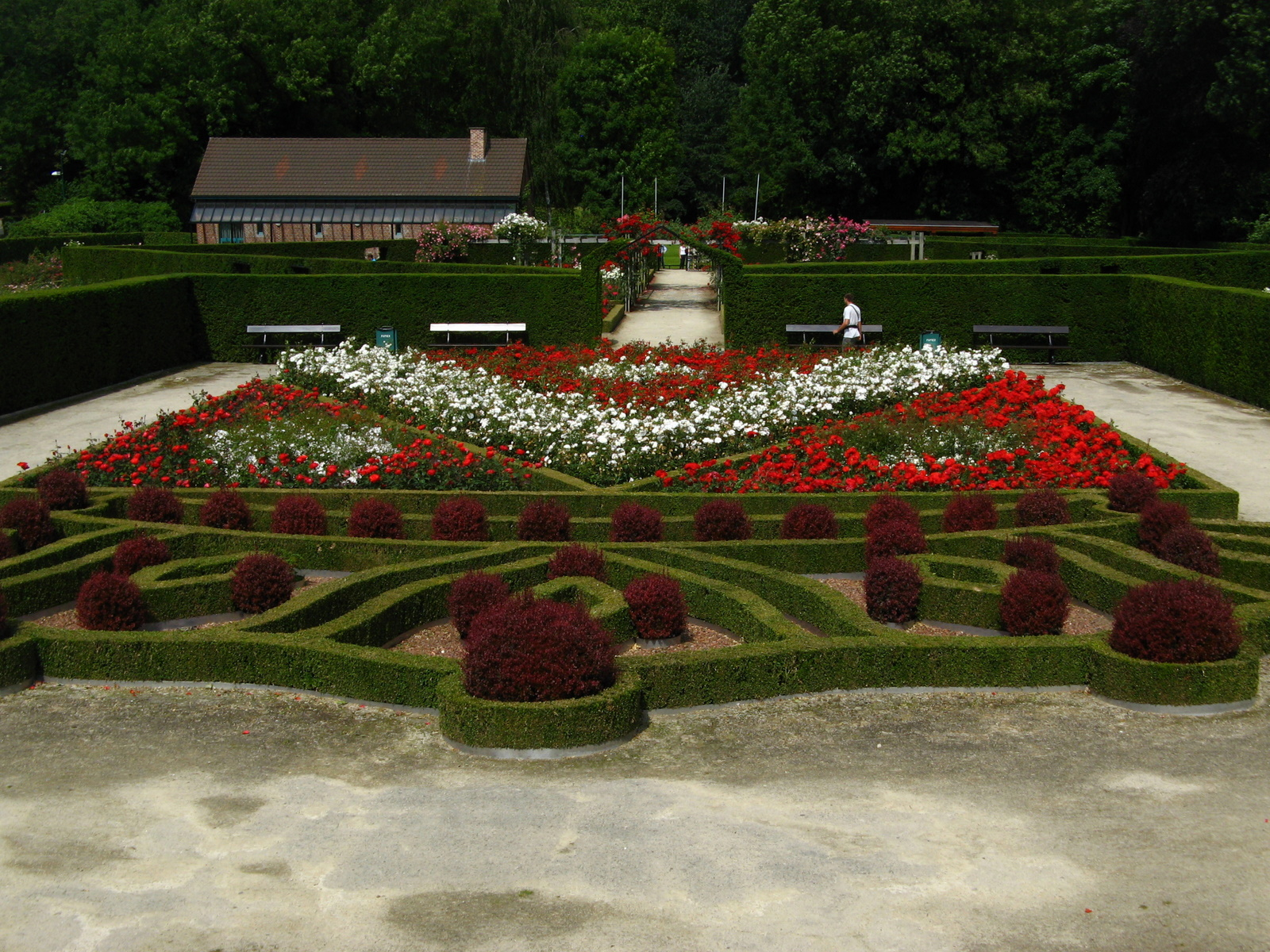
Coloma Rose Garden

The municipality is one of the largest municipalities in Flemish Brabant. The rural settlement grew into a major residential and professional community. Sint-Pieters-Leeuw has a lengthy history behind it.

The oldest document dates back to the 9th century and is a deed of donation by 'dame Angela', a noblewoman from Brabant, in which reference is made to a 'domain' of seven miles in length and one mile in width with a parent church and 9 subsidiary churches', donated to the chapter of Saint Peter in Deutz, Cologne.

From 1236 onwards the domain belonged to the Land of Gaasbeek. In 1284 Henry I, Duke of Brabant and lord of Gaasbeek, granted a copy of the local penal code to the populace, which led the municipality to long remain the principal seat of a 'meierij' (Dutch for a district over which a mayor has jurisdiction) and a college of Aldermen.

In 1687 the fiefdom of Gaasbeek was publicly sold in various parts. By marriage or inheritance both the water castle of Coloma, currently the Municipal Cultural Centre, and the rights of the fiefdom as well as all manner of provisions (among others mills) became the possession of important nobles and courtiers such as Jan Karel Roose, member of the Great Council of Mechelen and Vital-Alex de Coloma, chamberlain of empress Maria-Theresia.

Since 1 January 1977 the former municipalities of Sint-Pieters-Leeuw, Oudenaken, Ruisbroek, Sint-Laureins-Berchem and Vlezenbeek have been joined to form a new administrative residential community.

== Economy ==
Neuhaus, an international exporter of fine Belgian chocolate, is based in Sint-Pieters-Leeuw, as well as Lindemans Brewery, a brewery that produces lambics, a distinctly Belgian type of beer.

Other companies with a headquarters or main plant in Sint-Pieters-Leeuw include Belle-Vue Brewery, Mercedes-Benz Truck Center, Vanden Borre, Printer Systems (Avery Dennison), a Material Plant and Reinforcement Steel Plant of Besix and DATS 24 (a subsidiary of Colruyt).

== Sights ==
Attractions include:

- Coloma park with Coloma castle
- Rose garden and rose museum: besides the castle, the Coloma park has gained significant tourist attraction by the creation in 1995 of the Coloma Rose Garden. In the centre of Sint-Pieters-Leeuw bloom over 3,000 rose varieties from 25 different countries for a combined total of 300,000 flowers. Today it has become one of the most colourful natural areas in the Green Belt surrounding Brussels.
- The Sint-Pieters-Leeuw Tower, sometimes called the VRT-tower, is a 300-metre-tall (980 ft) transmitter tower. Built in 1996, it is the tallest free-standing structure in Belgium.
- Witse-tree, a tree known for being used in the popular crime drama, Witse.
- Castle of Klein-Bijgaarden, castle of the family Wittouck
- Domain Groenenberg - Gaasbeek, castle and park
- Zuunvallei, Natural landscape
- Zobbroekvallei, Natural landscape
- Hof ten Brukom
- Hof ten Zellik
- Castle of Rattendaal
- Church of Our Lady
- Rats Castle
- Saint Peter's Church
- Chapel of the Holy Cross
- Chapel of Saint Magdalen
- Chapel of Saint Roch
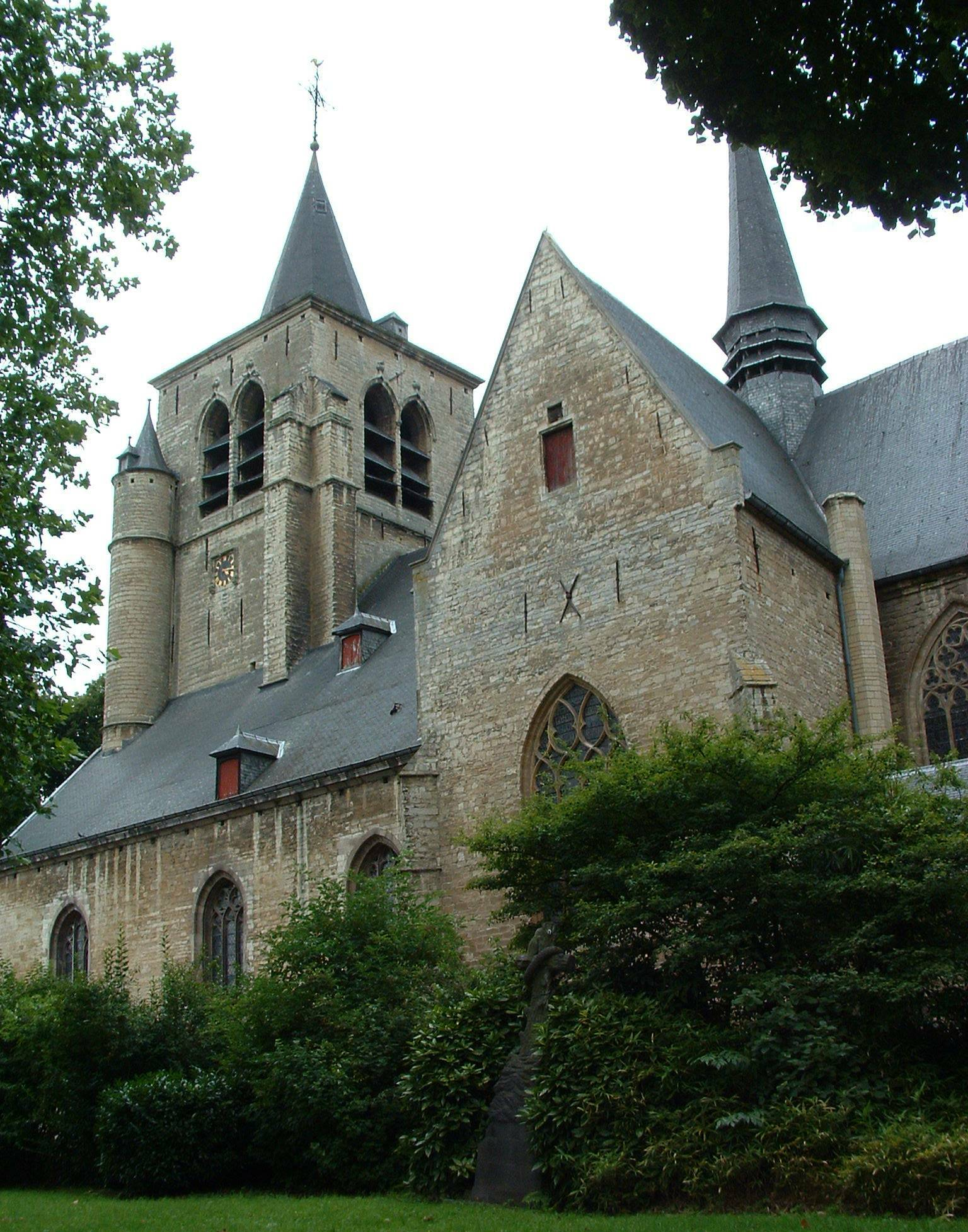
Saint Peter's Church (15th century)

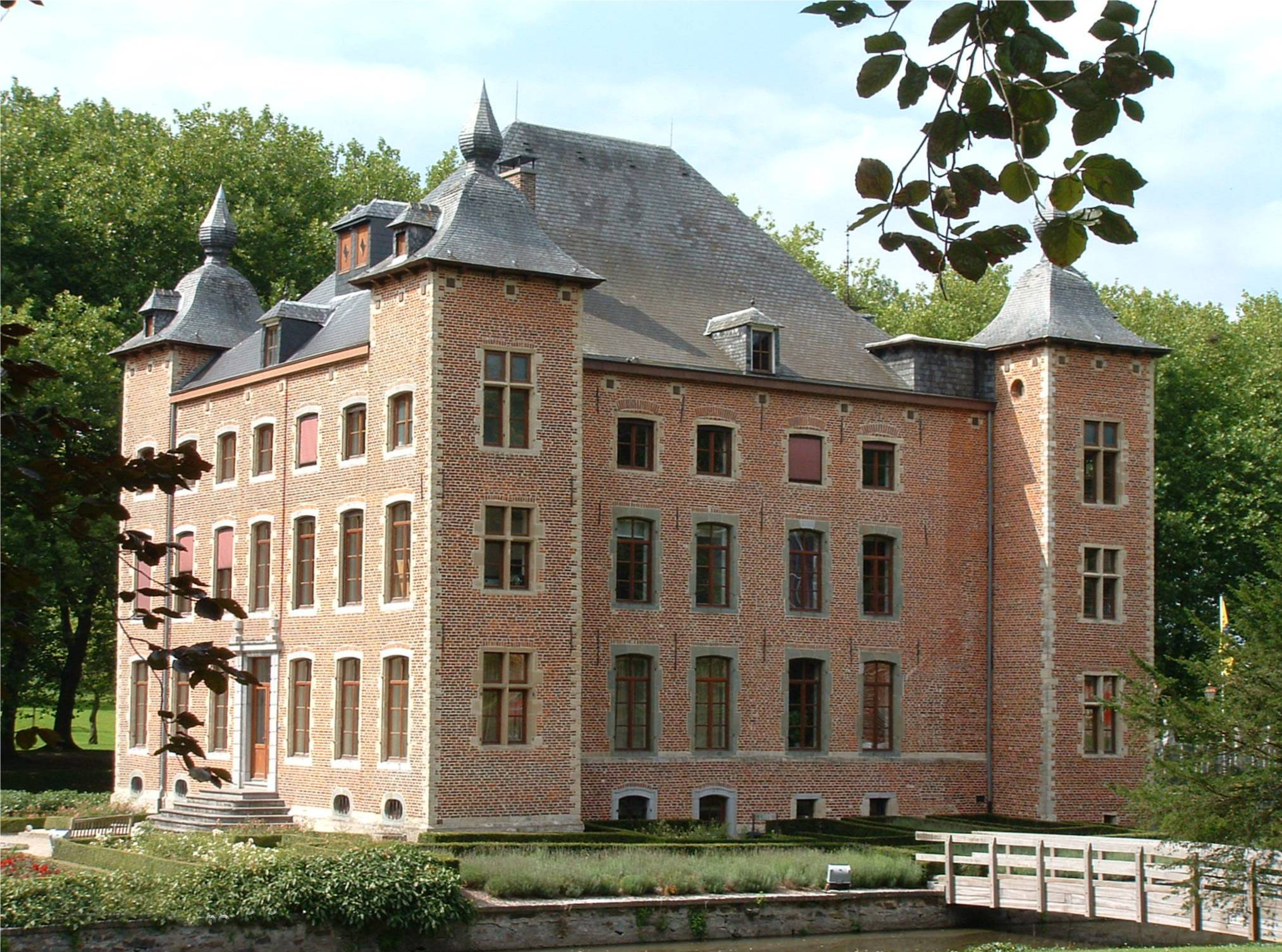
Castle of Coloma, currently the Municipal Cultural Centre

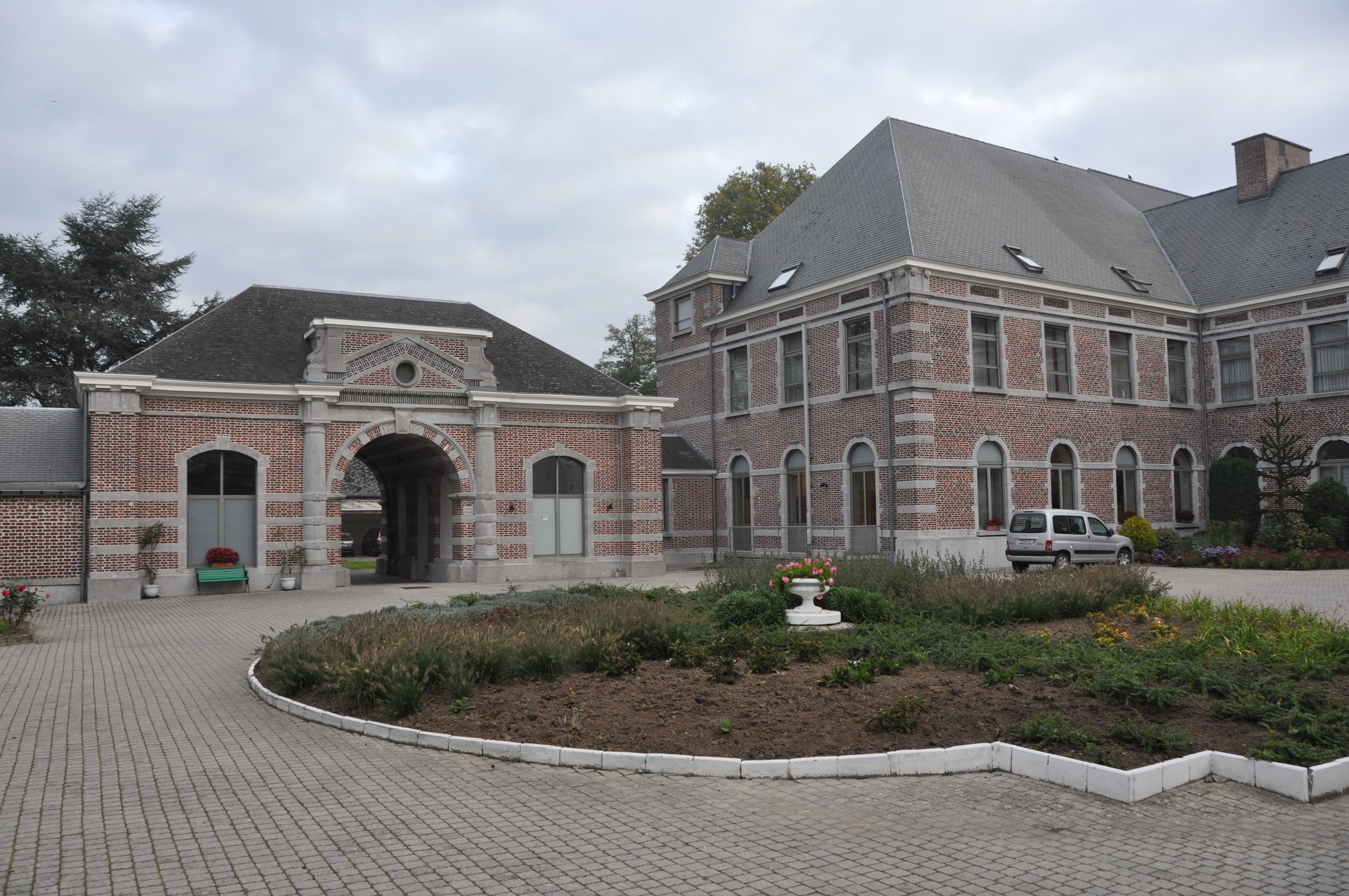
Castle of Wittouck

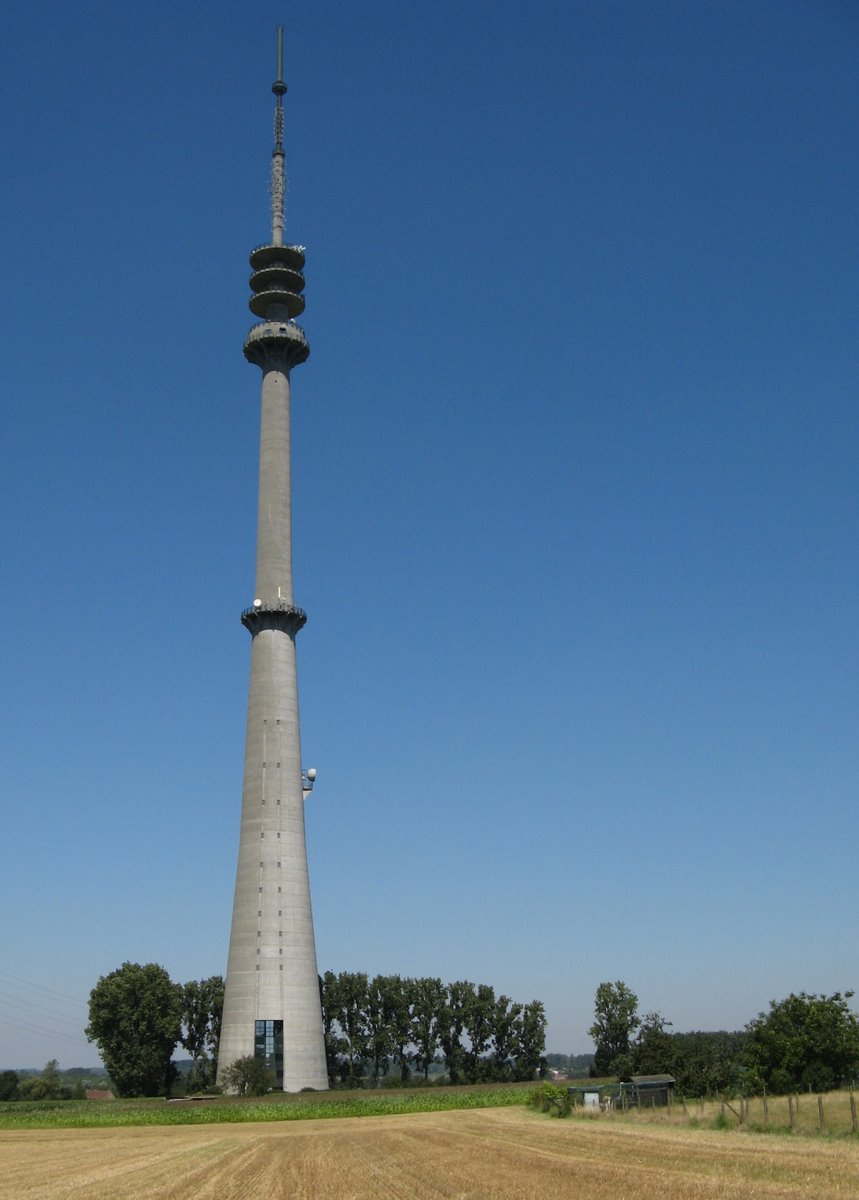
Sint-Pieters-Leeuw Tower

== Famous inhabitants ==
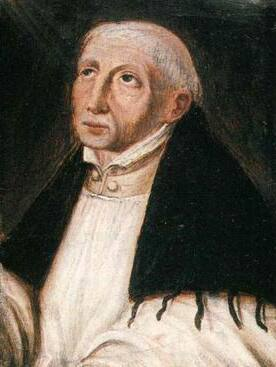
Jan Van Ruusbroec

- Johannes Malderus (1563–1633), bishop of Antwerp
- Jan van Ruusbroec (ca. 1293-1381), theologian and mystic
- Jef Jurion (born 1937), football player
- Prof. Baron Roger Van Overstraeten (1937-1999), professor
- Paul Van Himst (1943), Belgian footballer and coach
- Bart Anneessens (born 1993), international investor and artist
- Youri Tielemans (born 1997), football midfielder

== Twin Cities ==
- Germany: Altenahr
- Netherlands: Someren
