= Ruisbroek, Flemish Brabant =

Coordinates: 50°47′25″N 4°17′51″E

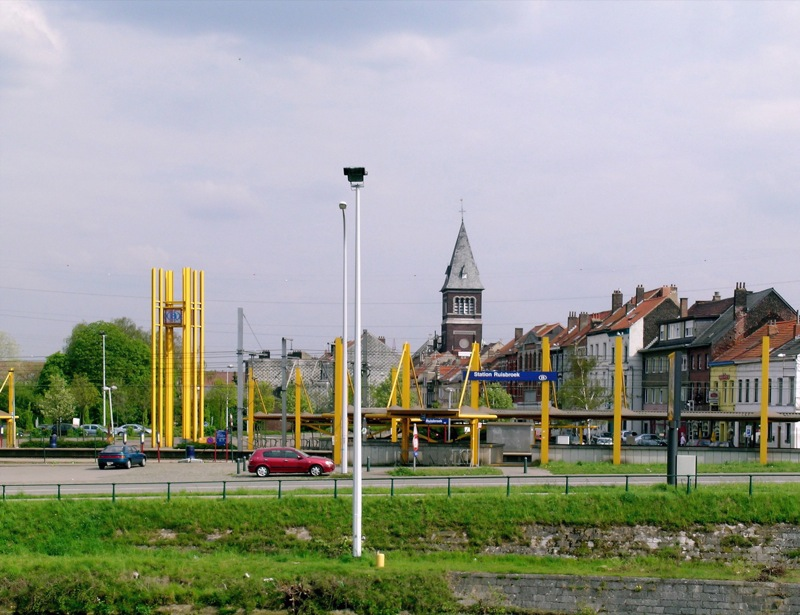
Ruisbroek Station

Ruisbroek is a village in the municipality of Sint-Pieters-Leeuw, in the Belgian province of Flemish Brabant. Previously a separate municipality, it became a deelgemeente of Sint-Pieters-Leeuw in 1977. Due to its proximity to the Brussels-Capital Region, the Brussels–Charleroi Canal, the Zenne river, the railway Brussels—Mons—Quévy and the Brussels outer ring (R0), the ward is heavily urbanised.

Ruisbroek has a railway station along the line Leuven—Braine-le-Comte. It is only 6 minutes to the Brussels south station. It is home to a large community of French-speakers. Ruisbroek has become popular with young families who wish to stay close to Brussels, but due to the house pricing have opted to move a little further from the city. The path along the canal offers a peaceful place for walking or cycling.
