= Pêcheresse =

Belgian lambic beer

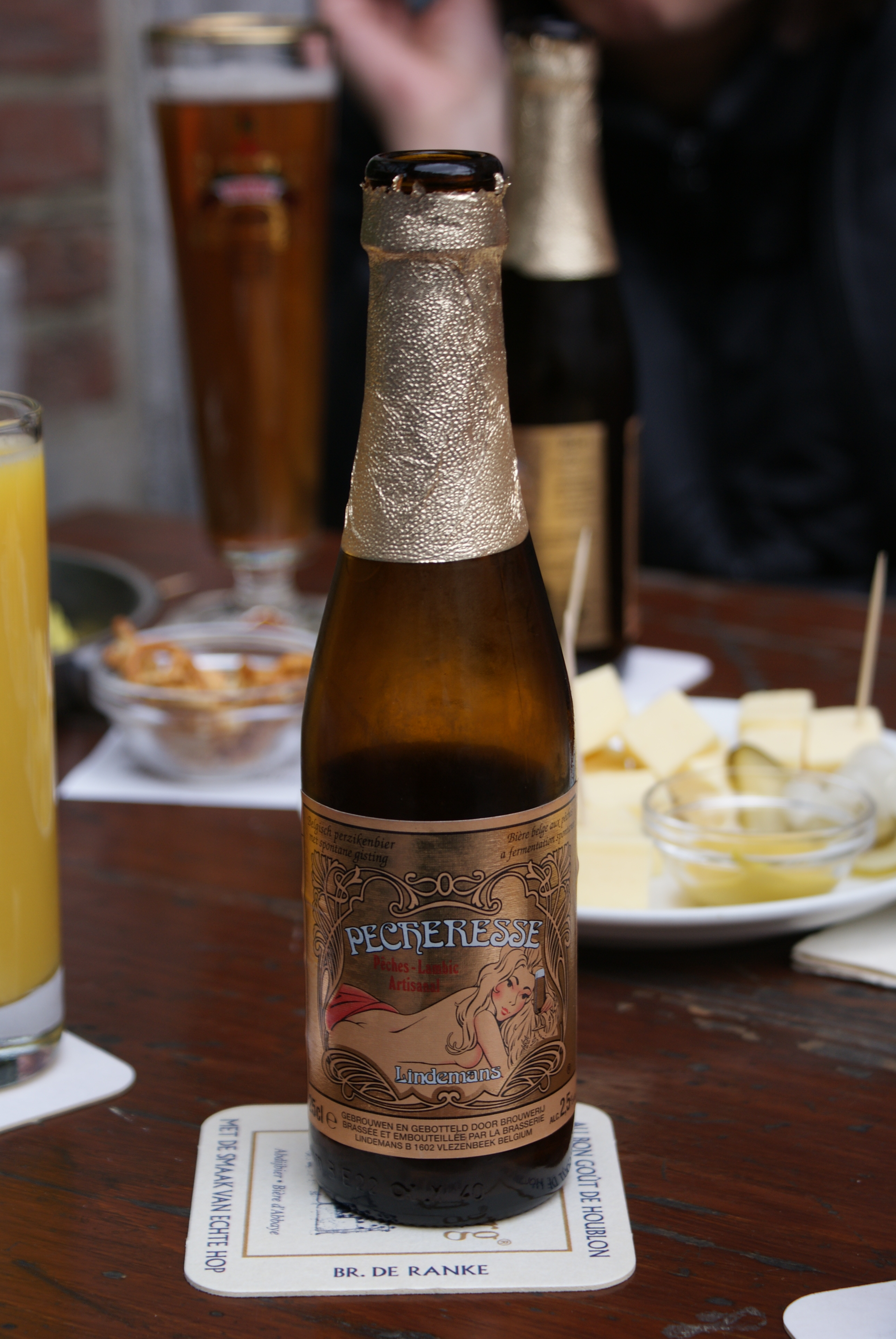

Pêcheresse (French pronunciation: [pɛʃʁɛs]) is a peach flavored lambic fruit Belgian beer produced by the Lindemans Brewery since 1987.

The name is a play on words between the French for peach (pêche) and the feminine French word for sinner or temptress (pécheresse). On the label of the bottle is a drawing of a young woman, drawn in Art Nouveau style, lying seductively on the sand, representing the sinner mentioned in the name of the beer. The flavor was called peche in the United States until 2025, when they changed it to pecheresse. This name had been used for decades in Europe.

As the name indicates, the beer is flavored with peach juice and the label says that each bottle contains 20% of peach concentrate.
