= Vlezenbeek =

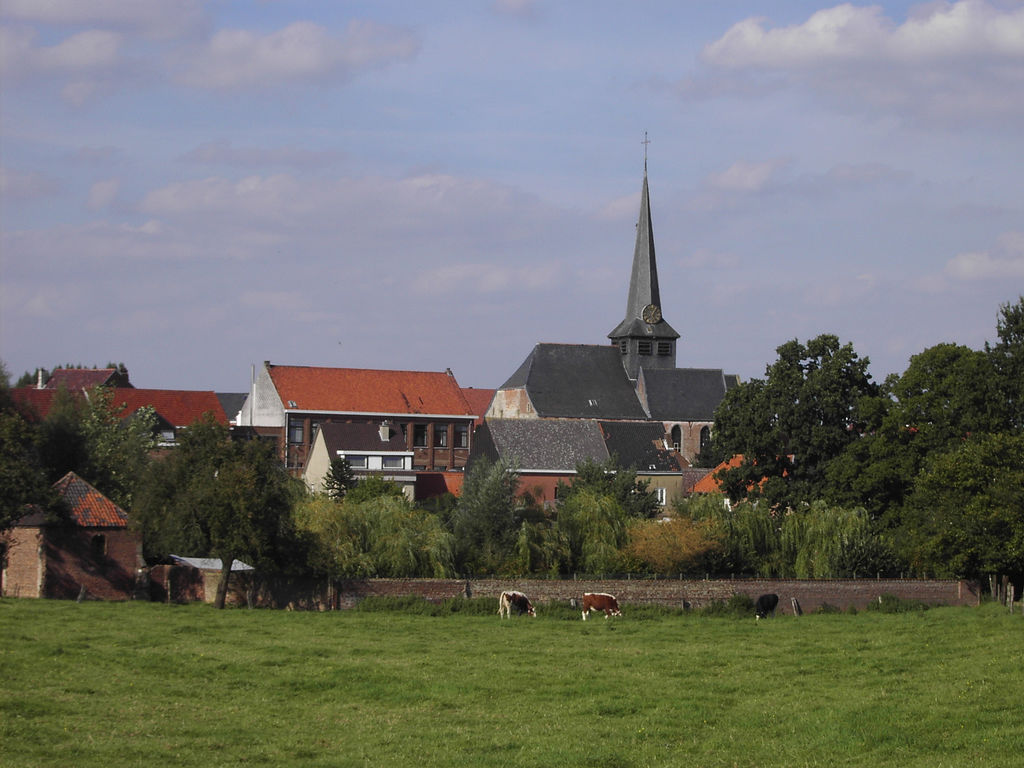

- Location in Belgium
- Coordinates: 50°48′N 4°13′E
- Country: Belgium
- Region: Flemish Region
- Community: Flemish Community
- Province: Flemish Brabant
- Arrondissement: Halle-Vilvoorde
- Municipality: Sint-Pieters-Leeuw

Vlezenbeek is a small town of 3,324 in the Flemish Brabant southwest of Brussels, Belgium. It is part of the municipality Sint-Pieters-Leeuw. It is the home of Neuhaus, an international exporter of fine Belgian chocolate, as well as Lindemans Brewery, a brewery that produces lambics, a distinctly Belgian type of beer.
