= Lindemans Brewery =

Belgian family brewery

Coordinates: 50.81579°N 4.21229°E

Brouwerij Lindemans
- Location: Vlezenbeek, Flemish Brabant, Belgium
- Opened: 1822
- Annual production volume: 75,000 hL

Active beers
Name	Type
Lindemans Apple	Lambic
Lindemans Cassis	Lambic
Lindemans Faro	Faro
Lindemans Framboise	Framboise
Lindemans Gueuze Cuvée René	Gueuze
Lindemans Kriek Cuvée René	Kriek
Lindemans Kriek	Kriek
Lindemans Pêcheresse	Lambic

Lindemans Brewery (Brouwerij Lindemans) is a Belgian family brewery based in Vlezenbeek, a small town in Flemish Brabant, southwestern Brussels. It produces lambics, a style of Belgian ale that uses raw wheat and wild yeast.

== History ==
The history of Lindemans Brewery began in 1822 when the brewery was founded on a small farm in Vlezenbeek. The brewery's patriarch was Frans Lindemans, the brother of the then-bailiff of Gaasbeek. In 1930, due to the growing success of the brewery, the agricultural activity was stopped definitively to focus on the brewing of Kriek and Gueuze. They produced their first Faro in 1978. Shortly after, in 1980 the brewery started its production of Framboise. Consequently, in 1986 and 1987, Lindemans added Cassis and Pêcheresse to its assortment. Finally, in 2005, Apple was the last beer to be introduced.

The brewery, to this day, is still a family company, run by brothers Nestor and Rene for a long time, before their sons, Dirk and Geert, took over the business, each having a 50% interest in the company.

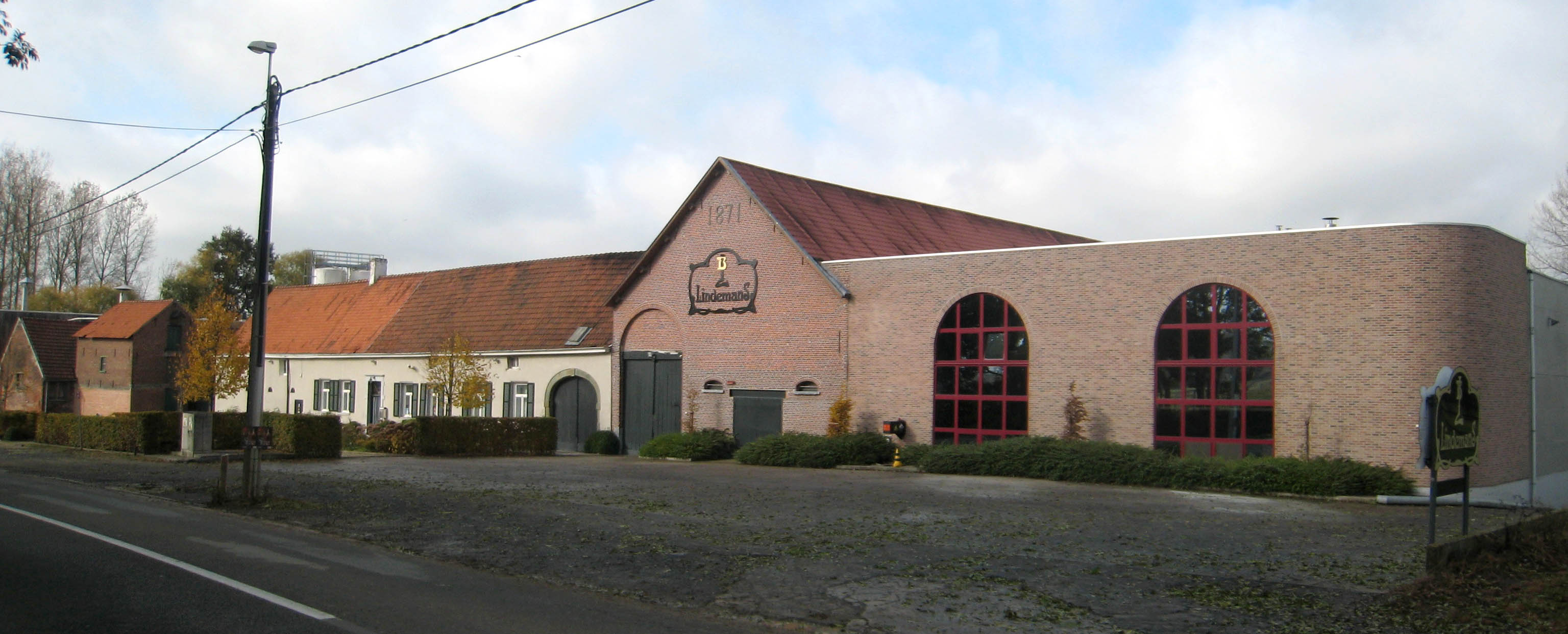
Lindemans Brewery in Vlezenbeek

== Production ==
Lindemans brews its lambic according to the method of spontaneous fermentation. This lambic is then used as the base for all of the fruit beers. In 25 years, the production grew from 5,000 to 50,000 hL (130,000 to 1,320,000 US gal). Over that span, the brewery expanded multiple times. In 1991 a new brewhouse was built next to the old one to increase capacity. In 2013 works for a new expansion, with a new bottling plant, started. Today, the brewery brews 85,000 hL (2,200,000 US gal) per year. 85,000 hL (2,200,000 US gal) of this amount is lambic, the base to which fruit juices are added. Each year 6,000 hL (160,000 US gal) of Lindemans Faro are produced, representing 7,5% of the entire production.

== Beers ==
=== Faro ===
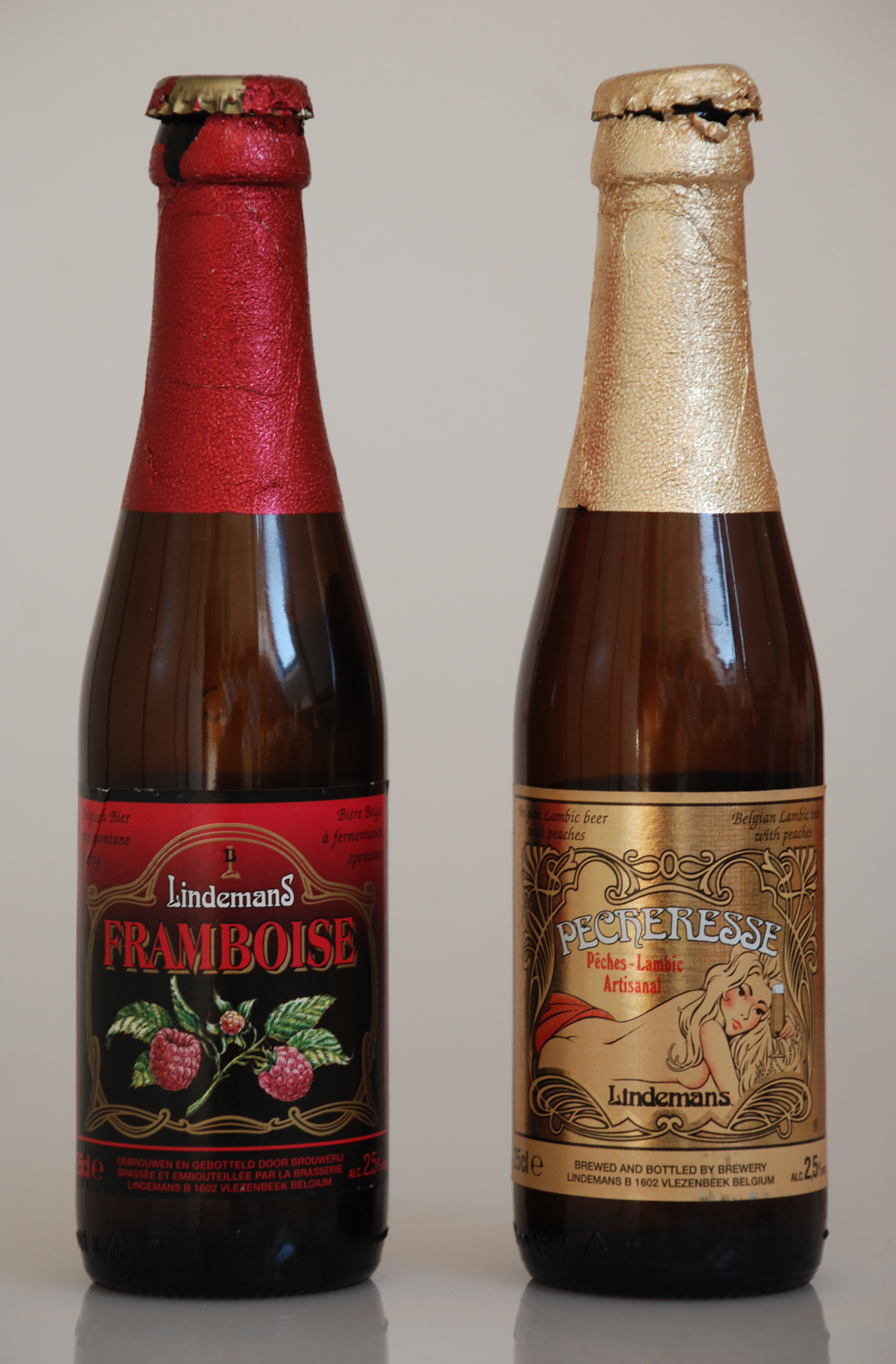
Framboise and Pêcheresse bottles

Lindemans Faro is a lambic beer. The first Lindemans Faro was brewed in 1978, when the beverage was becoming popular again. At 4% ABV, it is considered a light beer. It is available in 250 mL (8 1/2 US fl oz), 375 mL (12 3/4 US fl oz) and 750 mL (25 US fl oz) bottles.

=== Fruit beers ===
Lindemans varieties include Lambic Framboise (raspberry), Kriek (sour cherry), Pêcheresse (peach), Cassis (blackcurrant), Pomme (apple), and Strawberry.

Because of the limited availability of sour cherries from Schaerbeek, the traditional ingredient for Kriek, Lindemans Kriek is made using unsweetened cherry juice which is added to a mixture of lambics of different ages. The resulting beer is described as less sour and more fruity. It contains 2.5% ABV.

== Awards ==
- Asia Beer Awards
  - 2010, Silver in the category Fruit Lambique: Pecheresse
- Australian International Beer Awards
  - 2014, Gold Award: Cassis
  - 2014, Silver Award: Kriek
  - 2014, Silver Award: Oude Gueuze Cuvée René
  - 2014, Bronze Award: Pecheresse
  - 2014, Bronze Award: Apple
- Beer International Recognition Awards
  - 2011, Best Fruitbeer: Kriek
  - 2011, Belgian Grand Award: Kriek
- Brussels Beer Challenge
  - 2013, Gold Medal in the category Lambique and Gueuze: Oude Gueuze Cuvée René
  - 2013, Gold Medal in the category Fruit Lambique
- Great International Beer Festival
  - 2011, Gold Award: Faro
- International Beer Awards
  - 2010, Winner in the category Fruitbeers: Framboise
- US Open Beer Competition
  - 2011, Golden Award in the category Fruit and Spice: Pecheresse
  - 2014, Golden Award in the category Fruit and Spice: Pecheresse
- World Beer Awards
  - 2013, World's Best Sour Beer
  - 2013, World's Best Kriek
  - 2013, World's Best Gueuze: Oude Gueuze Cuvée René
  - 2013, Europe's Best Lambique: Apple
  - 2013, Europe's Best Label: Oude Gueuze Cuvée René
- World Beer Championships
  - 1994, Platinum Medal: Kriek
  - 1994, Gold Medal: Pecheresse
- World Brewing Congress
  - 1994, Platinum Award: Kriek
  - 1994, Gold Award: Pecheresse
  - 2001, World Champion: Kriek
- 1985: Michael Jackson named Kriek Lindemans as one of the 5 best beers in the world.
- Californian Beer Festival
  - 1995, Gold Medal: Framboise
  - 1995, Gold Medal: Gueuze
- World Beer Cup
  - 1996 & 1997, Lindemans named one of the 10 best breweries in the world.
  - 2000, Gold Medal: Oude Gueuze Cuvée René
  - 2001, Beer-World Champion: Kriek
  - 2002, Bronze Medal: Oude Gueuze Cuvée
- Hong Kong International Beer Awards
  - 2009, Winner Fruitbeers: Framboise
  - 2010, Winner Fruitbeers: Framboise
