= Cantillon (brewery) =

Brewery in Brussels, Belgium

Coordinates: 50.8418°N 4.3353°E

Cantillon Brewery
- Industry: Alcoholic beverage
- Founded: 1900; 126 years ago
- Founder: Paul Cantillon; Marie Troch
- Headquarters: Anderlecht, Brussels, Belgium
- Products: Beer
- Owner: Jean-Pierre van Roy
- Website: www.cantillon.be

Brasserie-Brouwerij Cantillon ("Brewery Cantillon") is a small Belgian traditional family brewery based in Anderlecht, Brussels. Cantillon was founded in 1900 and exclusively brews lambic beers.

== Overview ==
The brewery was founded in 1900 by Paul Cantillon, whose father was also a brewer, and his wife, Marie Troch. As of 2011, the owner is Jean-Pierre van Roy, the fourth-generation brewer at Cantillon. Since launch, the only major change has been a shift to organic ingredients in 1999. Cantillon was one of more than one hundred operating breweries in Brussels when founded, and was the only one to remain operational through the 2000s. In 2014, van Roy announced that the brewery would be acquiring more maturation space, effectively doubling production by 2016–17.

Cantillon produces 400,000 bottles of beer a year.

== Beers ==
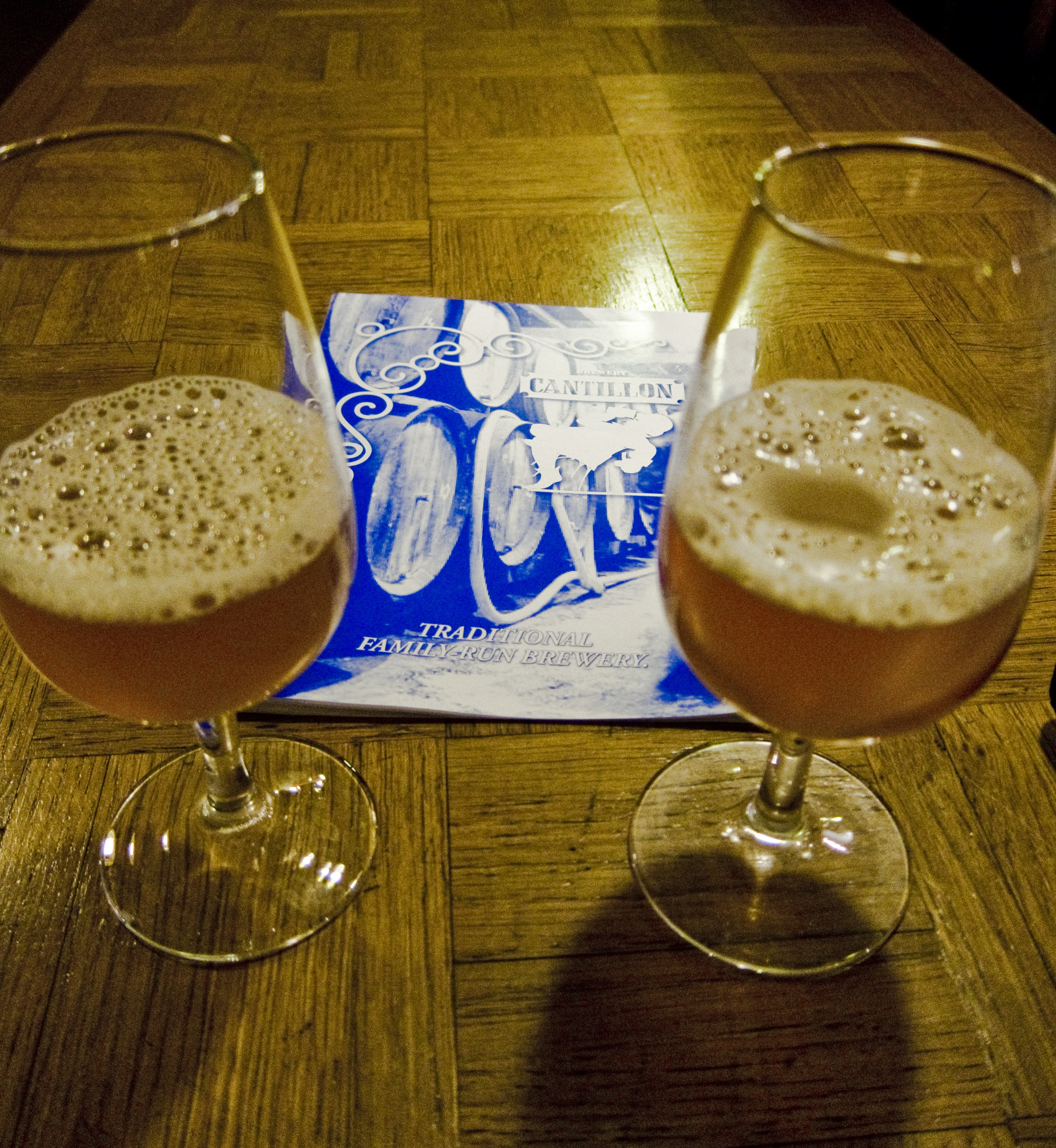
Gueuze beer

In the traditional lambic style, beers, with a mash bill of 2/3 malted barley and 1/3 unmalted wheat, are spontaneously fermented in open topped attic mounted vats called coolships, aged in oak or chestnut, blended (from different batches and ages), bottled, and then bottle conditioned for a year. Half of the brewery's production is gueuze; once a year a batch of kriek is made. For fruit-flavored beers, empty casks are filled with various fruits and macerated for three months to dissolve the fruits; young lambic is added to supply sugar for fermentation.

- Blåbær - bilberry (made every year for a bottle shop in Denmark)
- Cuvée Saint Gilloise - This is not a traditional gueuze, in that it is made from only two-year-old lambic, not from a blend of old and young beers. It is also dry-hopped in the cask for three weeks with fresh Styrian Golding hops. Re-fermentation in the bottle is achieved with the addition of a small amount of candy sugar.
- Fou' Foune - apricot
- Grand Cru Bruocsella - unblended lambic aged for three years, and refermented with liqueur d'expedition
- Gueuze
- Iris - 100% pale barley malt beer with half fresh hops aged for two years and then dry-hopped with Hallertau hops
- Kriek - lambic made with cherries
- Lou Pepe Gueuze - blended from beers of the same age, thus not a strictly authentic gueuze
- Lou Pepe Kriek - with more fruit (cherries)
- Lou Pepe Framboise - with more fruit (raspberries)
- Magic Lambic - 80% Lou Pepe Framboise and 20% blueberry lambic with vanilla
- Mamouche - elderflower
- Nath - brewed with rhubarb
- Rosé de Gambrinus - framboise
- Saint Lamvinus - Merlot and Cabernet Franc grapes
- Soleil de Minuit - cloudberry (made in 1999 and in 2013)
- Vigneronne - Muscat grapes

== Gueuze Museum ==
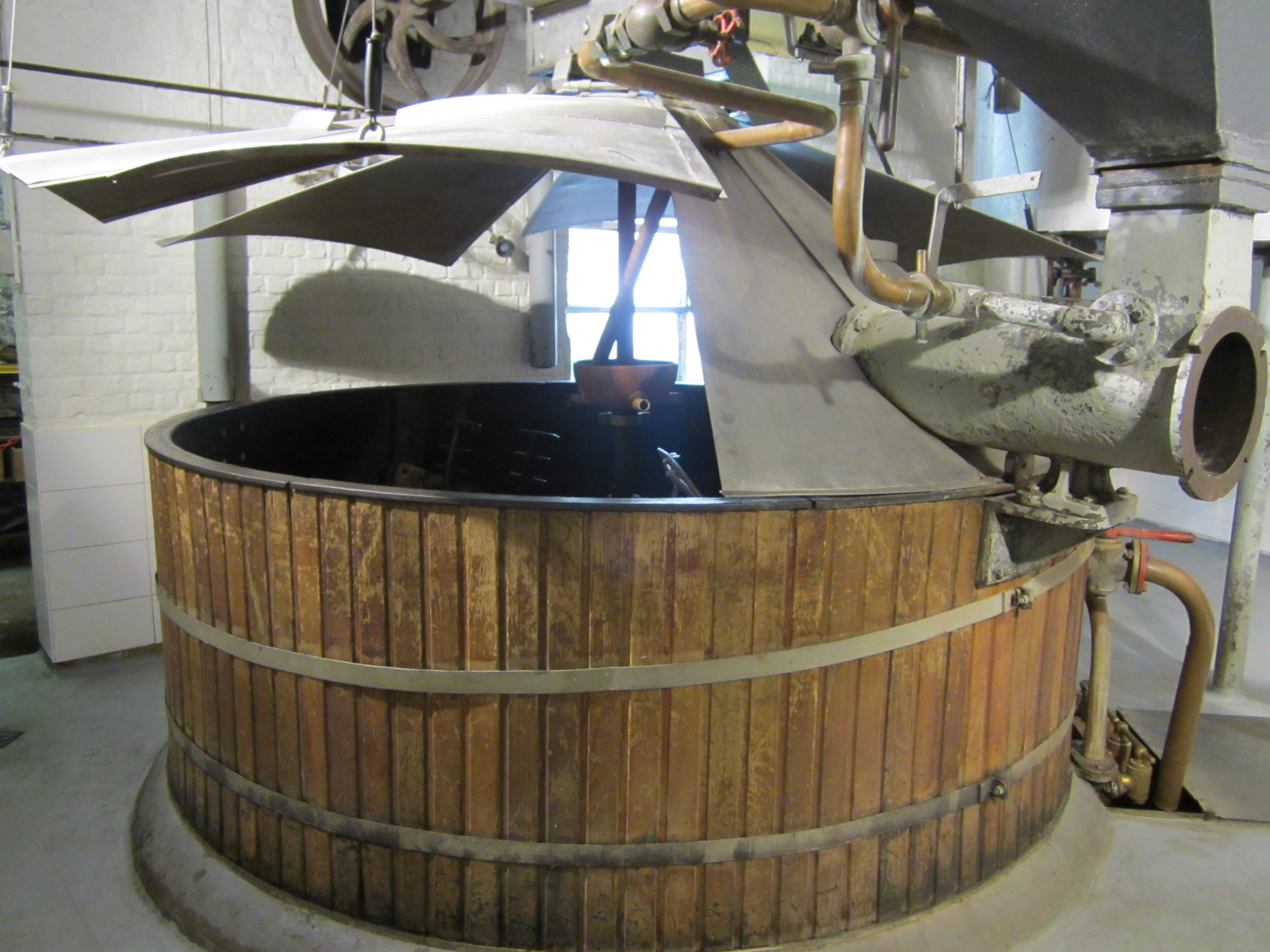
Cantillon Brewery mash tun, part of the gueuze museum

The brewery also houses the Gueuze Museum. Patricia Schultz listed the brewery and its museum in 1,000 Places to See Before You Die.
