= Gaasbeek =

Coordinates: 50°47′N 4°11′E

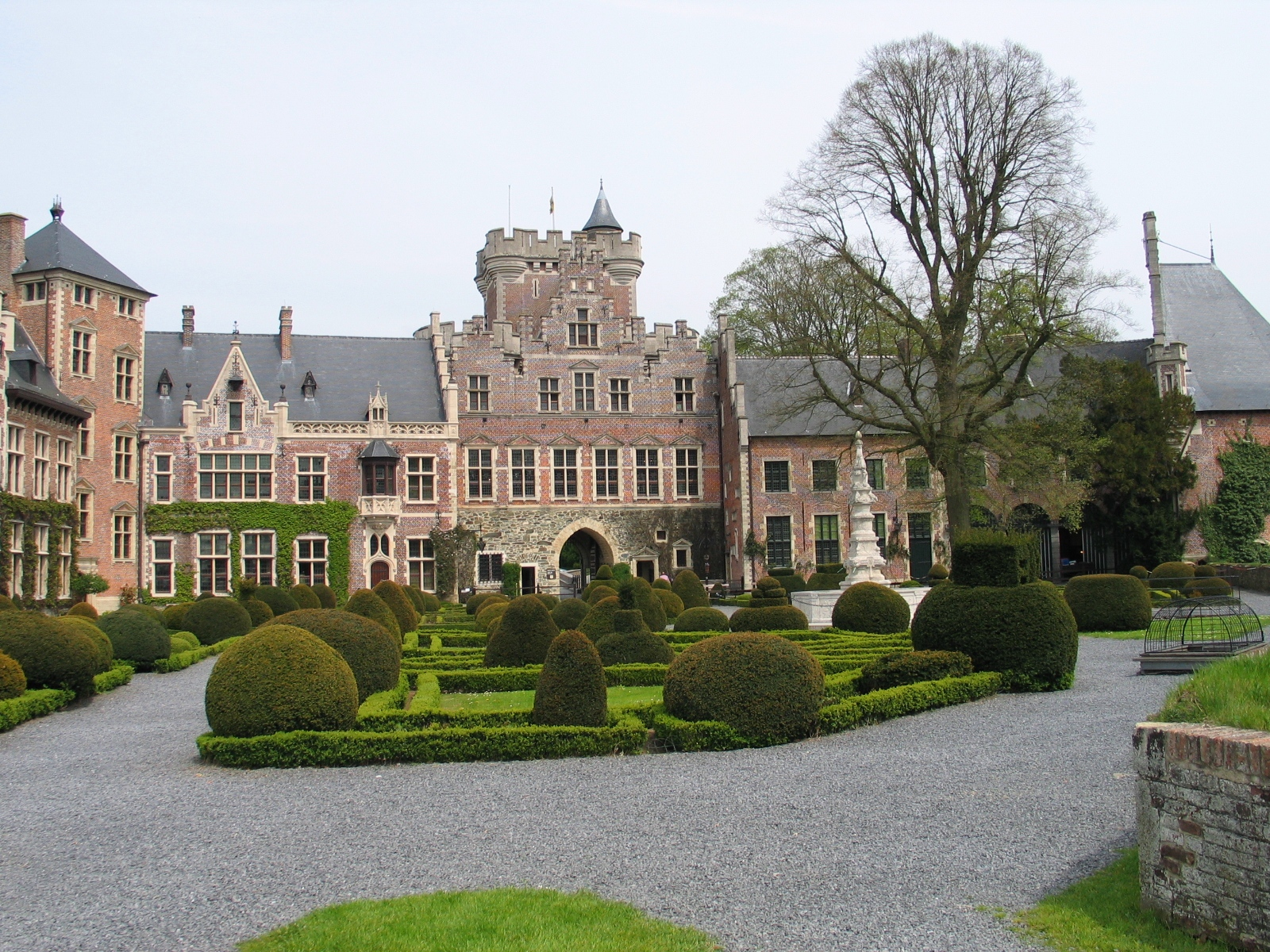
Gaasbeek Castle

Gaasbeek is a village in the Belgian municipality of Lennik in Flemish Brabant. It is most known for Gaasbeek Castle, which is now a national museum.

In 2007 it was chosen as one of the 15 most beautiful villages in Flanders.

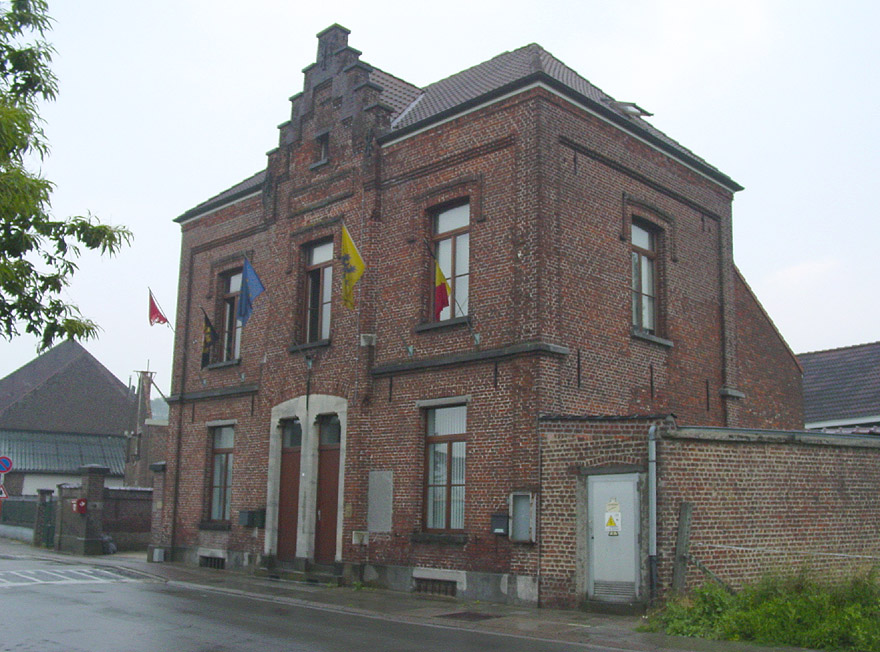
Old school building in Gaasbeek
