= Anne-Françoise Pypaert =

Anne-Françoise Pypaert is the first woman to hold the title of brewmaster at a Trappist brewery. She was appointed in 2013 as the brewmaster at Brasserie d’ Orval, at l'Abbaye Notre Dame d'Orval. She is also in charge of the dairy, which produces 260 tonnes of semi-hard cheese. Pypaert started at the Brasserie d’Orval in 1992 after graduating from the Institut Meurice in Brussels and was the only woman who worked at Orval at that time. She was the Director of Quality Control at Brasserie d'Orval from 1995 until 2014 before becoming the head brewmaster, the first woman in the world to hold this title at a Trappist brewery.
