= Zundert Trappist =

Dutch Trappist beer

Zundert
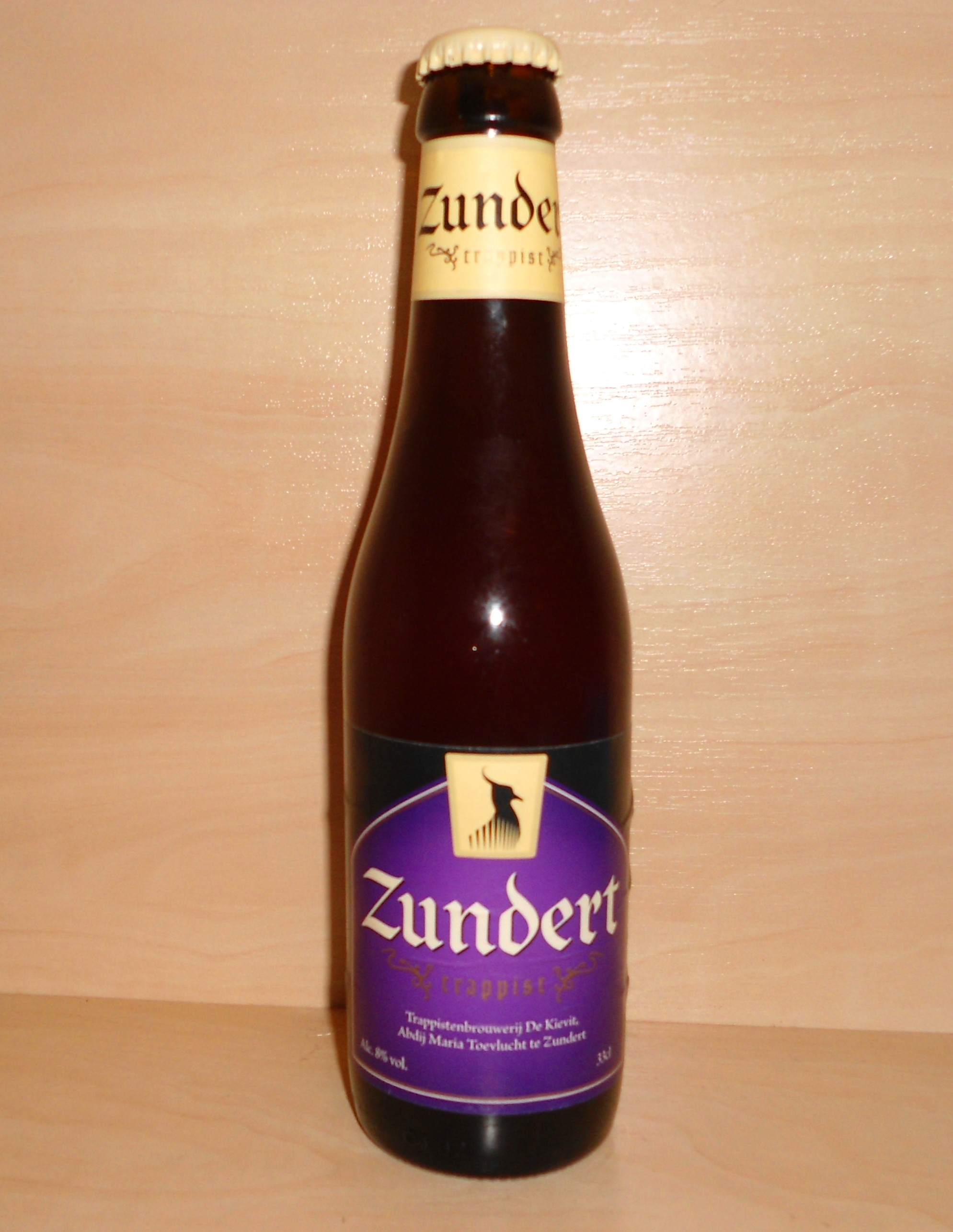
- Bottle of Zundert
- Type: Beer
- Origin: Netherlands
- Introduced: 2013
- Alcohol by volume: 8%
- Style: Trappist beer
- Website: www.zunderttrappist.nl

Zundert Trappist (Dutch pronunciation: [ˈzʏndərt]) is a Trappist beer produced by De Kievit Trappist Brewery, part of the Trappist abbey Maria Toevlucht, from the town of Zundert in the Netherlands.

Since 2018 De Kievit Trappist Brewery produces another Trappist beer. This new beer is called Zundert 10 after the 10% alcohol it contains and the original Zundert has been renamed Zundert 8.

Zundert Trappist' and La Trappe were recently the only Trappist beers brewed in the Netherlands.. However, it was announced on 13 May 2025 that the abbey was closing due to the lack of brothers, and that the beer would therefore lose its Trappist label.. It is actually not produced anymore.
