= La Trappe =

La Trappe may refer to:

- La Trappe Abbey, a Trappist monastery in Soligny-la-Trappe, France
- a brand of Trappist beers brewed by De Koningshoeven Brewery
