= Rochefort Abbey =

Cistercian abbey in Rochefort, Belgium

Coordinates: 50.17803°N 5.22036°E

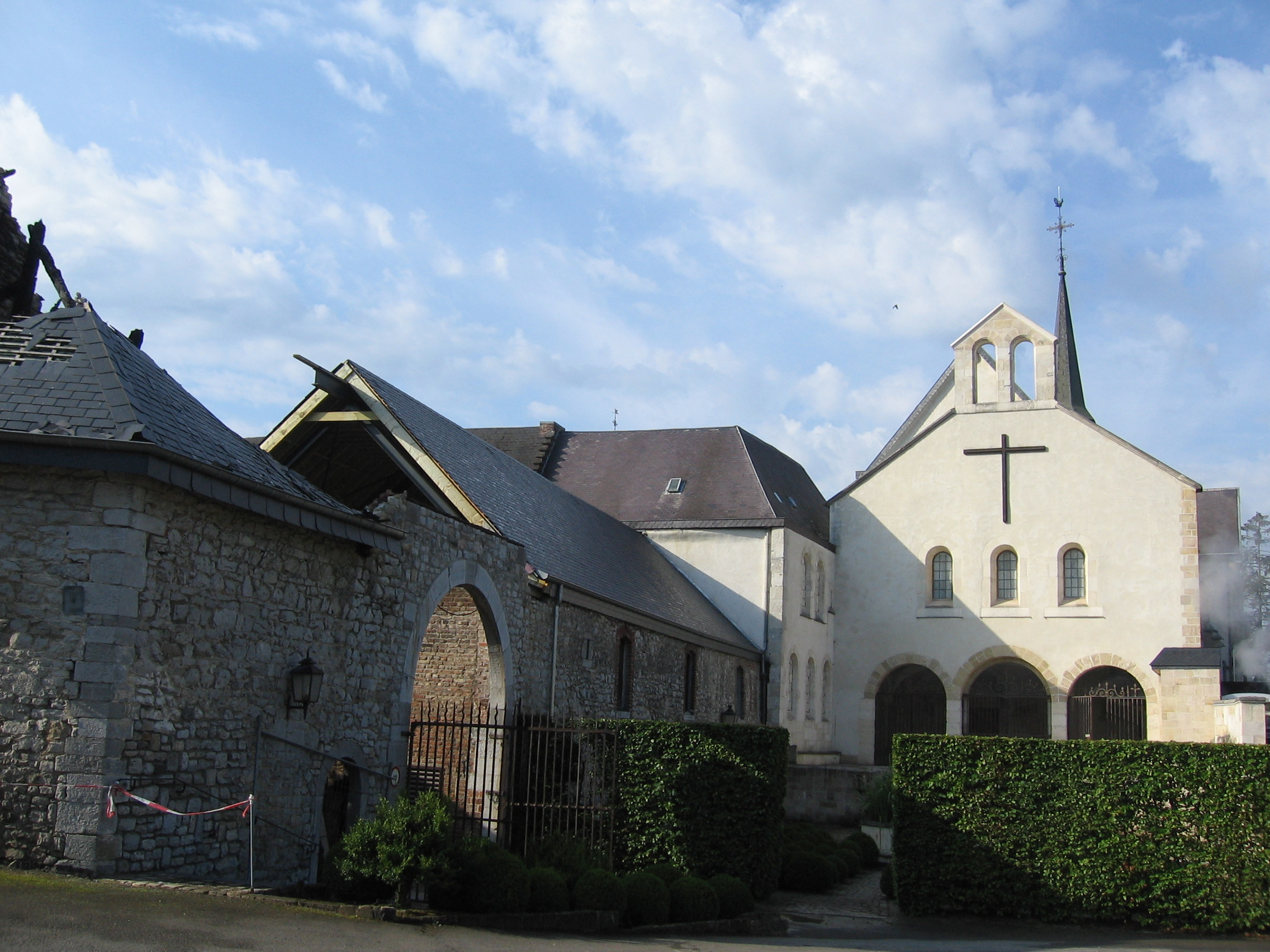
Entrance to the church

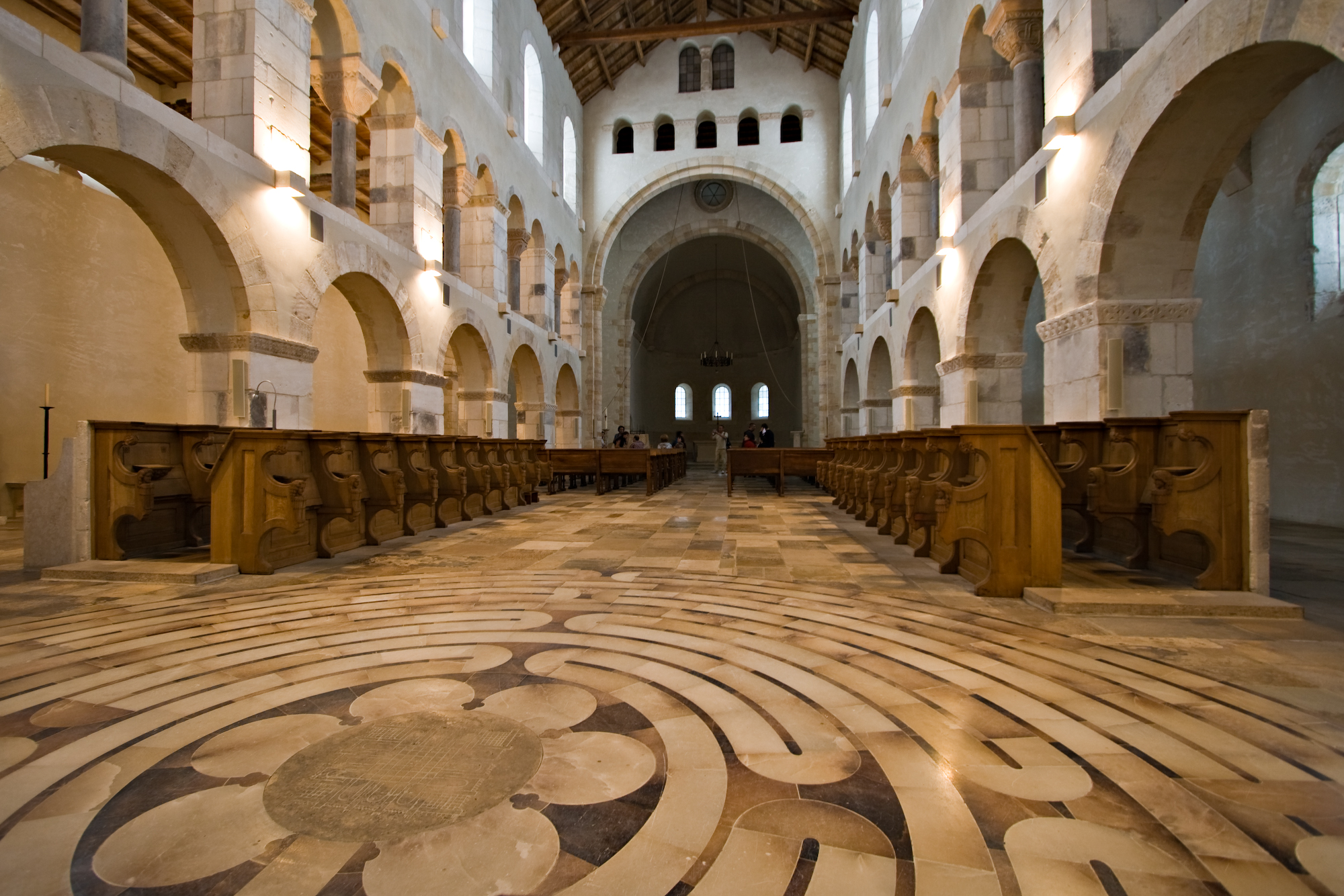
Interior of the church

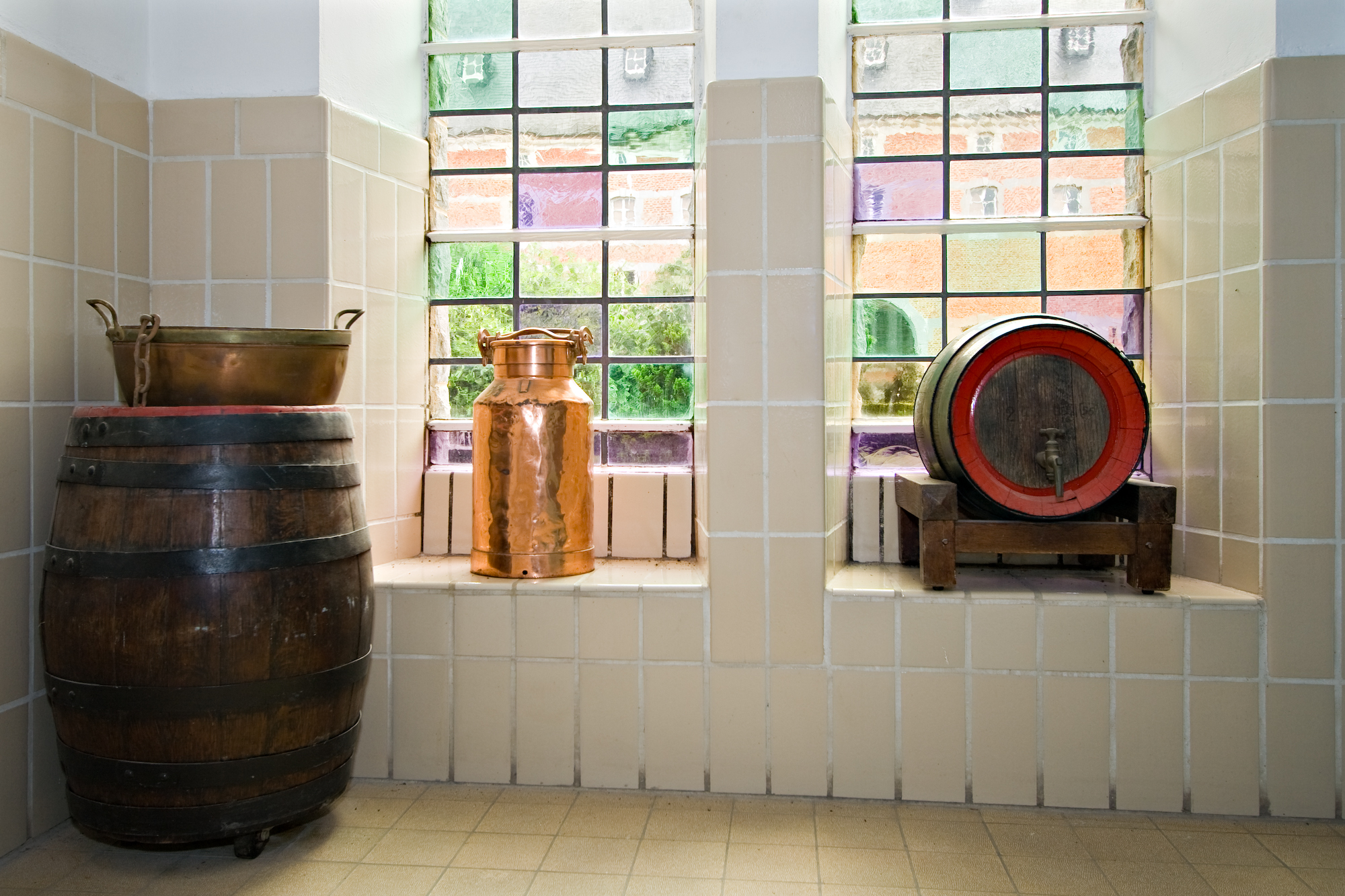
Brewery in Abbaye Notre-Dame de Saint-Remy Rochefort

The Trappist Abbey of Rochefort or Abbey of Notre-Dame de Saint-Rémy, which belongs to the Cistercians of Strict Observance, is located in Rochefort in the province of Namur (Wallonia, Belgium). The abbey is famous for its spiritual life and its brewery, which is one of few Trappist beer breweries in the world. Life in the abbey is characterised by prayer, reading and manual work, the three basic elements of Trappist life. The motto of the abbey is Curvata Resurgo.

== History ==
=== Early history ===
Around 1230, Gilles de Walcourt, count of Rochefort founded a monastery for Cistercian nuns called Secours de Notre-Dame. In 1464 Louis de la Marck ordered the nuns to leave the monastery which had decayed and they were replaced by monks. The monastery was the latest Daughter-house of the abbey of Abbey of Cîteaux. During the Eighty Years War the abbey was ravaged by the Protestant armies of the Seventeen Provinces (1568) and the Austrian armies of John of Austria (1577). Around 1595, the first brewery was founded within the abbey.

In the 17th century the abbey suffered from war, famine and the plague. On 30 April 1650, an army from Lorraine, led by baron Châtelet, invaded the abbey. The monks had to flee to Marche, as well as in 1652 and 1653.

In 1789 the French revolutionary army invaded the Austrian Netherlands, and in 1797 the abbey was closed and sold to Lucien-Joseph Poncelet. Poncelet demolished the abbey around 1805 and converted it to a farm. Material of the abbey was used for buildings in Rochefort.

=== Modern history ===
On 11 October 1887, father Anselmus Judong from the Trappist Abbey of Achel came to the old abbey and on 21 December 1887 the buildings were bought by the monks of Achel. The abbey was restored and new buildings were raised. A new brewery was founded, but it would take until 1952 for the brewery to produce enough beer to be sold.

Brewing is the main source of income for the monastery since the 16th century. The brewery was renovated in 1952 and produces high fermentation beer. The Cistercian Order of the Strict Observance is known for their seclusion and the brewery is not accessible to the public.

On 29 December 2010 a large fire destroyed a large part of the abbey. Though the blaze has destroyed much of the building's timber structure, the monks escaped unharmed and the flames did not damage the beer producing facilities.

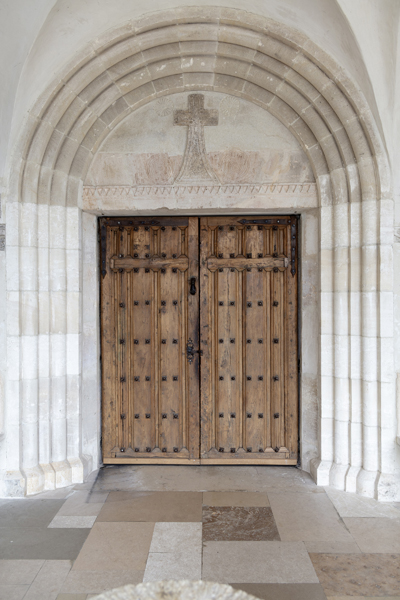
Entrance

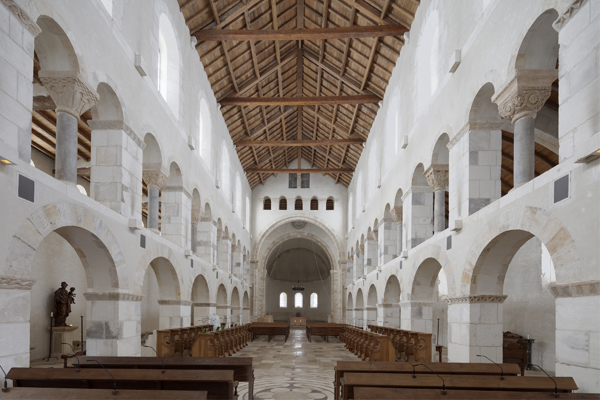
Interior

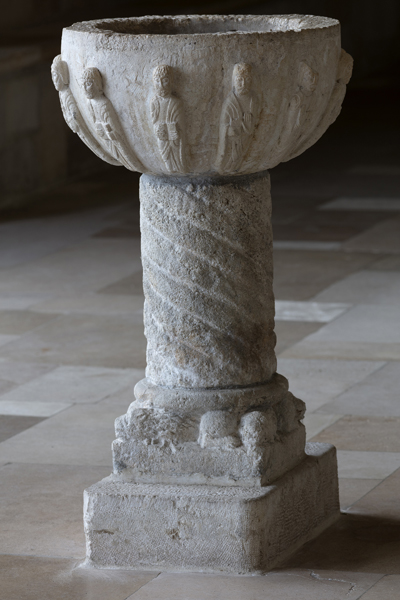
Baptismal font

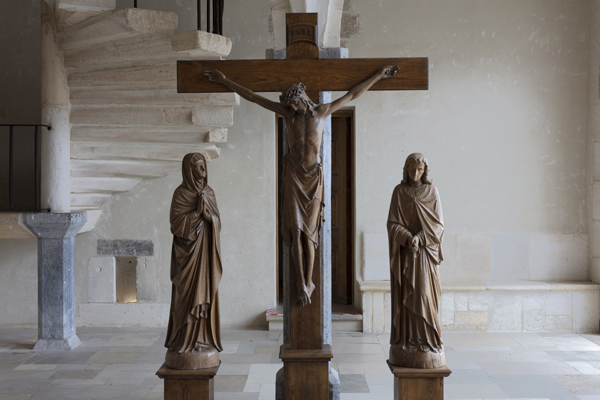
Crucifixion

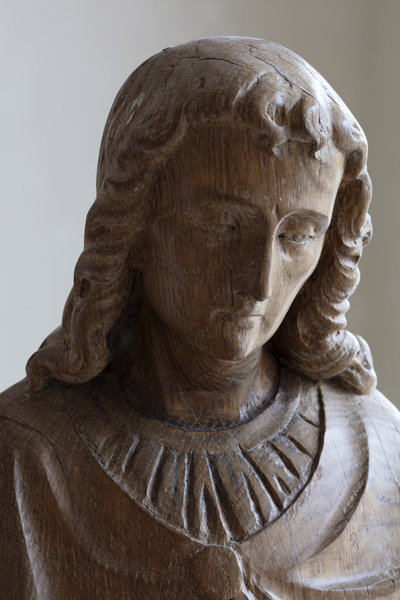
Detail

== Sources ==
- A. Fourneau, L’abbaye Notre-Dame de Saint-Remy à Rochefort: Histoire d’une communauté cistercienne en terre de Famenne, 239 p., Rochefort, 2002
- J. Van Remoortere, Ippa's Abdijengids voor Belgie, Lannoo, 1990
