= Engelszell Abbey =

Monastery in Engelhartszell, Austria

Coordinates: 48.499°N 13.734°E

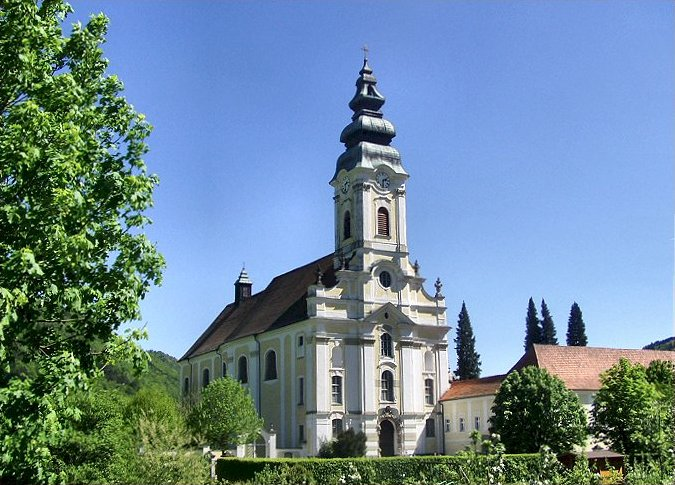
Engelszell Abbey Church

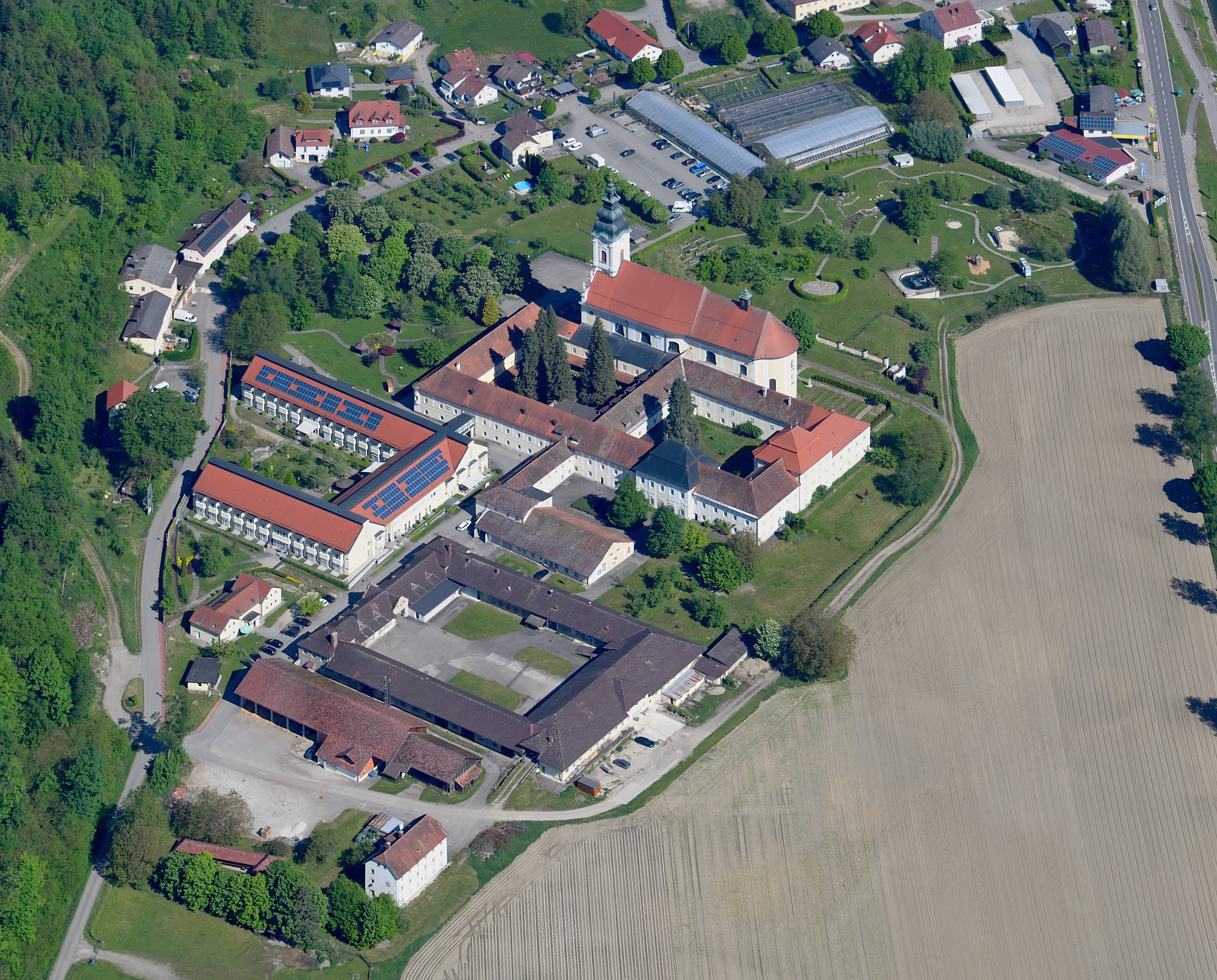
Aerial view of the abbey

Engelszell Abbey (German: Stift Engelszell) was the last Trappist monastery in Austria. It is located near Engelhartszell in the Innviertel in Upper Austria.

In May 2023, the community of Engelszell was suppressed (ordered to be closed) by the Order of Cistercians of the Strict Observance. With only four monks left, it was determined that it was no longer able to maintain a Trappist life within the monastery.

== History ==
=== Cistercians ===
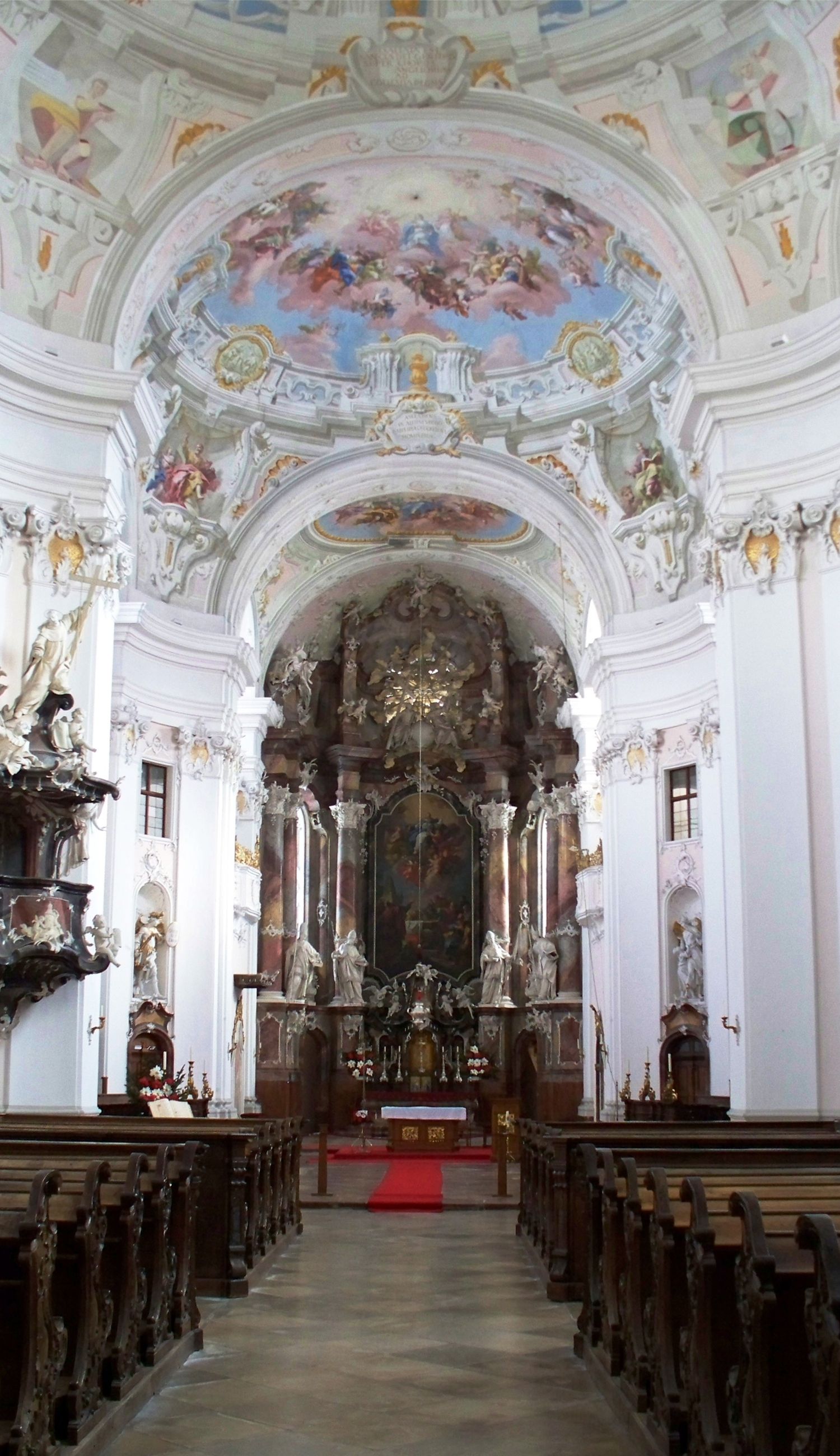
Abbey church interior

The abbey was founded in 1293 by Bernhard of Prambach, Bishop of Passau, as a Cistercian monastery. It was settled in 1295 by monks from Wilhering Abbey, its mother house, and was of the filiation of Morimond Abbey. It suffered a considerable decline, both spiritual and financial, in the period of the Protestant Reformation, and for a time passed into private ownership. From 1618 onwards the intervention and support of Wilhering Abbey gradually restored it.

On Easter Sunday 1699, a disastrous fire plunged the abbey once again into financial difficulties and from 1720 its management was in the hands of administrators. In 1746, Leopold Reichl, the last and greatest of Engelszell's abbots of the Common Observance, was appointed, and soon rebuilt its finances. Between 1754 and 1764, Leopold rebuilt the present-day abbey church.

In 1786, Engelszell was dissolved by Emperor Joseph II and the buildings were subsequently put to several secular uses, including as a factory and as a residence.

=== Trappists ===
In 1925, Engelszell was occupied and re-founded as a Trappist monastery by refugee German monks expelled after World War I from Oelenberg Abbey in Alsace. These monks had found temporary shelter in Banz Abbey but were looking for a permanent home. Initially established as a priory, in 1931 it was elevated to the rank of an abbey, and the former prior, Gregorius Eisvogel, appointed abbot, in which office he was dedicated by Johannes Maria Gföllner, Bishop of Linz, at a ceremony in Wilhering Abbey.

On 2 December 1939, the abbey was confiscated by the Gestapo and the community, numbering 73, evicted. Four monks were sent to Dachau Concentration Camp, while others were imprisoned elsewhere or drafted into the Wehrmacht. At the end of the war in 1945, only about a third of the previous community returned. They were augmented, however, by the refugee German Trappists expelled from Mariastern Abbey, Banja Luka, Bosnia, under their abbot Bonaventura Diamant.

Since 1995, the abbot has been Marianus Hauseder. As at 2012, the number of monks in the community was 7.

The resident community of four monks announced that it is "no longer able to maintain a Trappist life within the monastery. The decision to dissolve was taken in consultation with the Trappist order." On 15 May 2023, the community of Engelszell was suppressed (ordered to be closed) by the Order of Cistercians of the Strict Observance.

== Buildings ==
Engelszell Abbey church, built between 1754 and 1764, is an impressive church in the Rococo style, with a tower 76 metres high. The interior contains notable works of art works by Bartolomeo Altomonte, Joseph Deutschmann and the stuccoist Johann Georg Üblhör. After structural damage in about 1957 the ceiling of the nave was repainted with a contemporary work by Fritz Fröhlich.

== Gallery ==
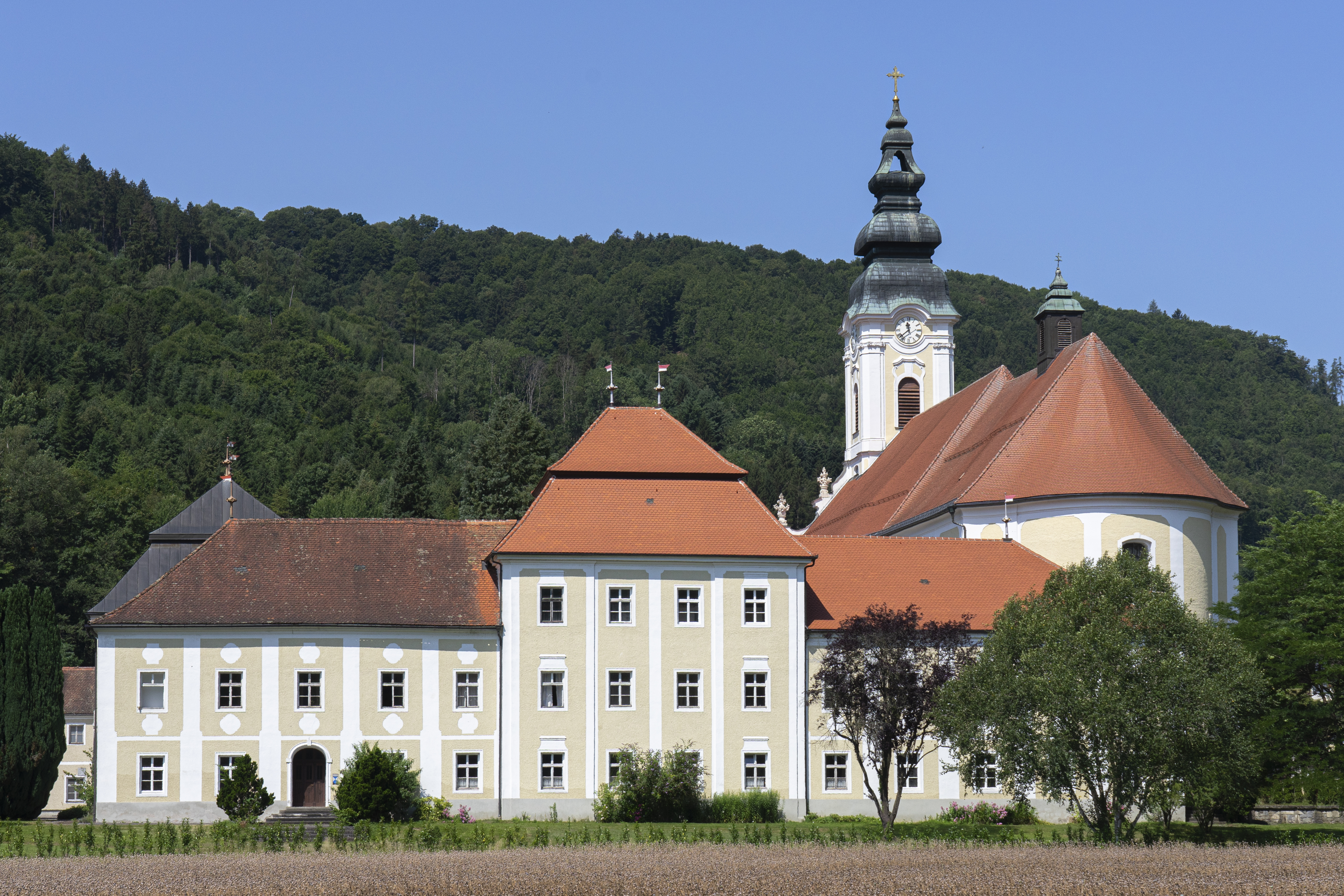
Trappistenkloster Engelszell

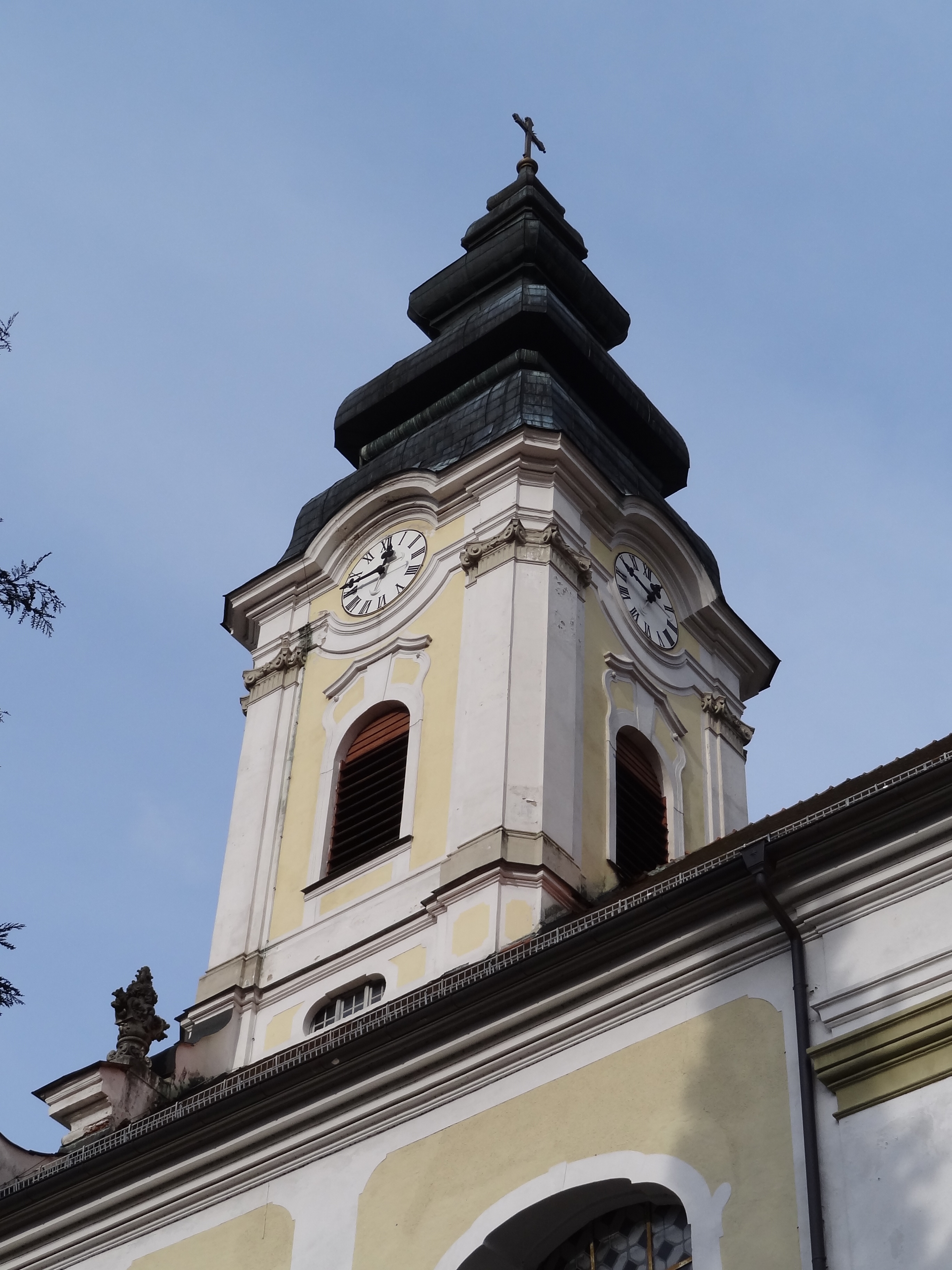
Abbey Church steeple

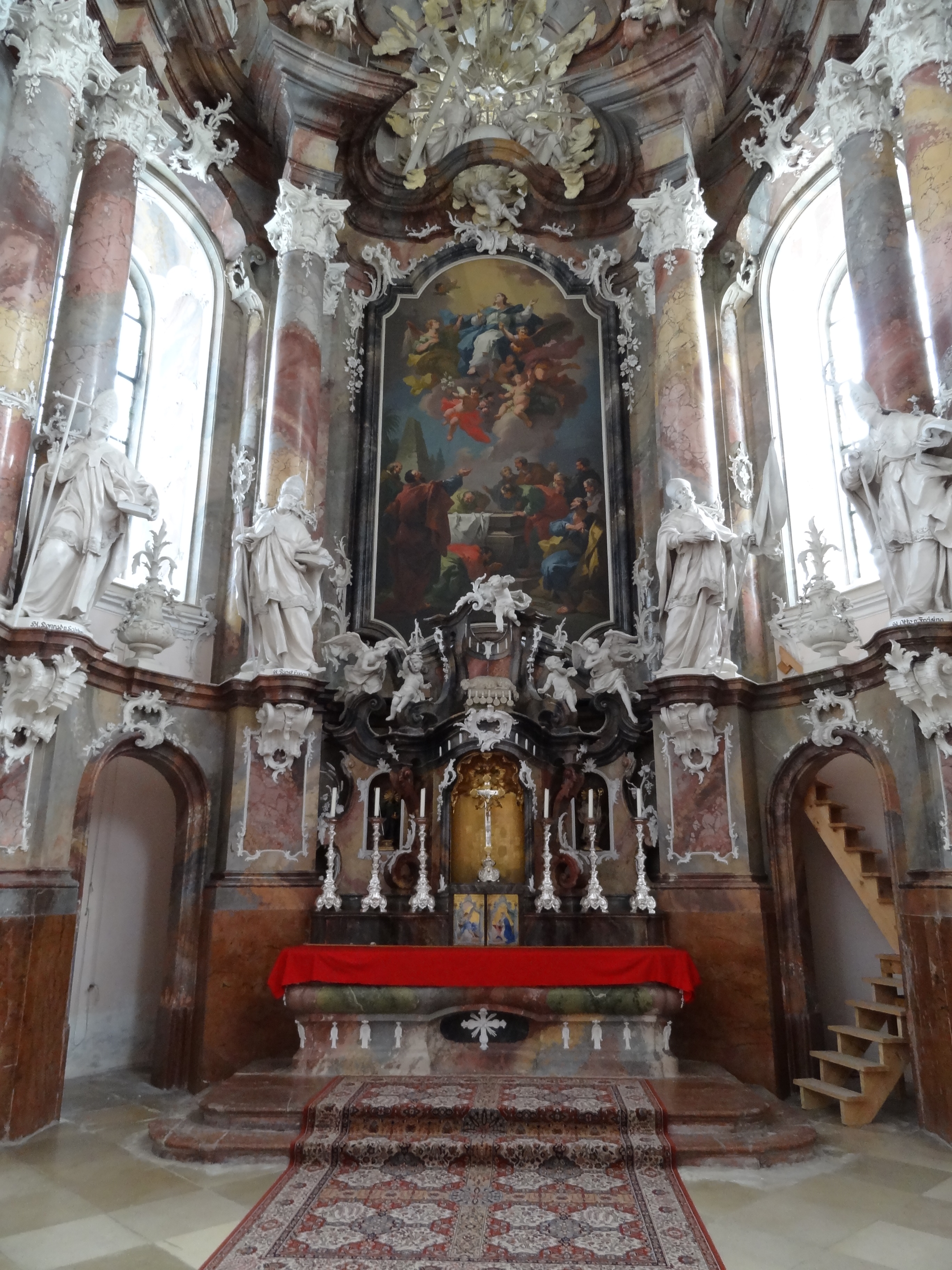
Abbey Church high altar

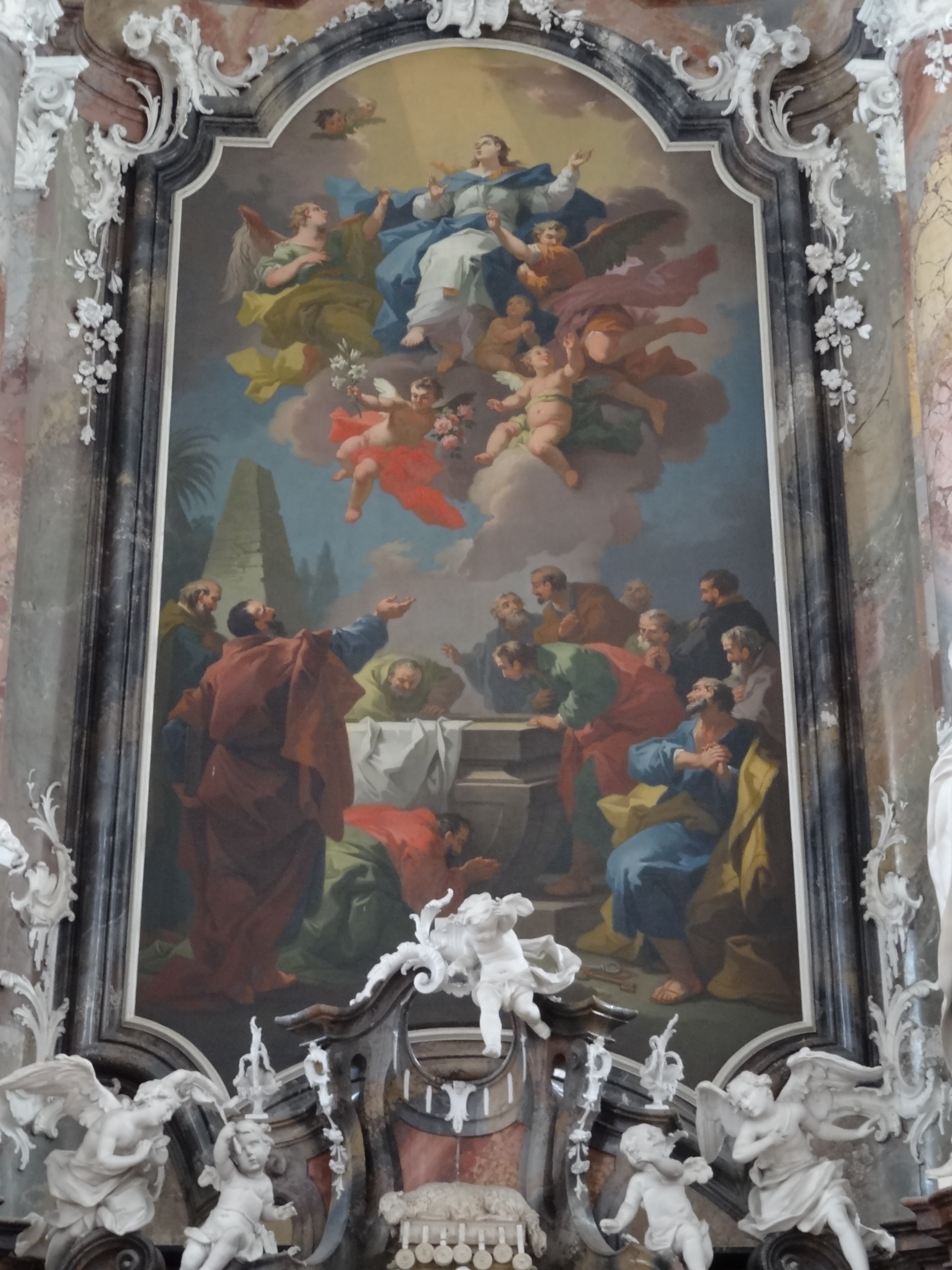
Abbey Church high altarpiece

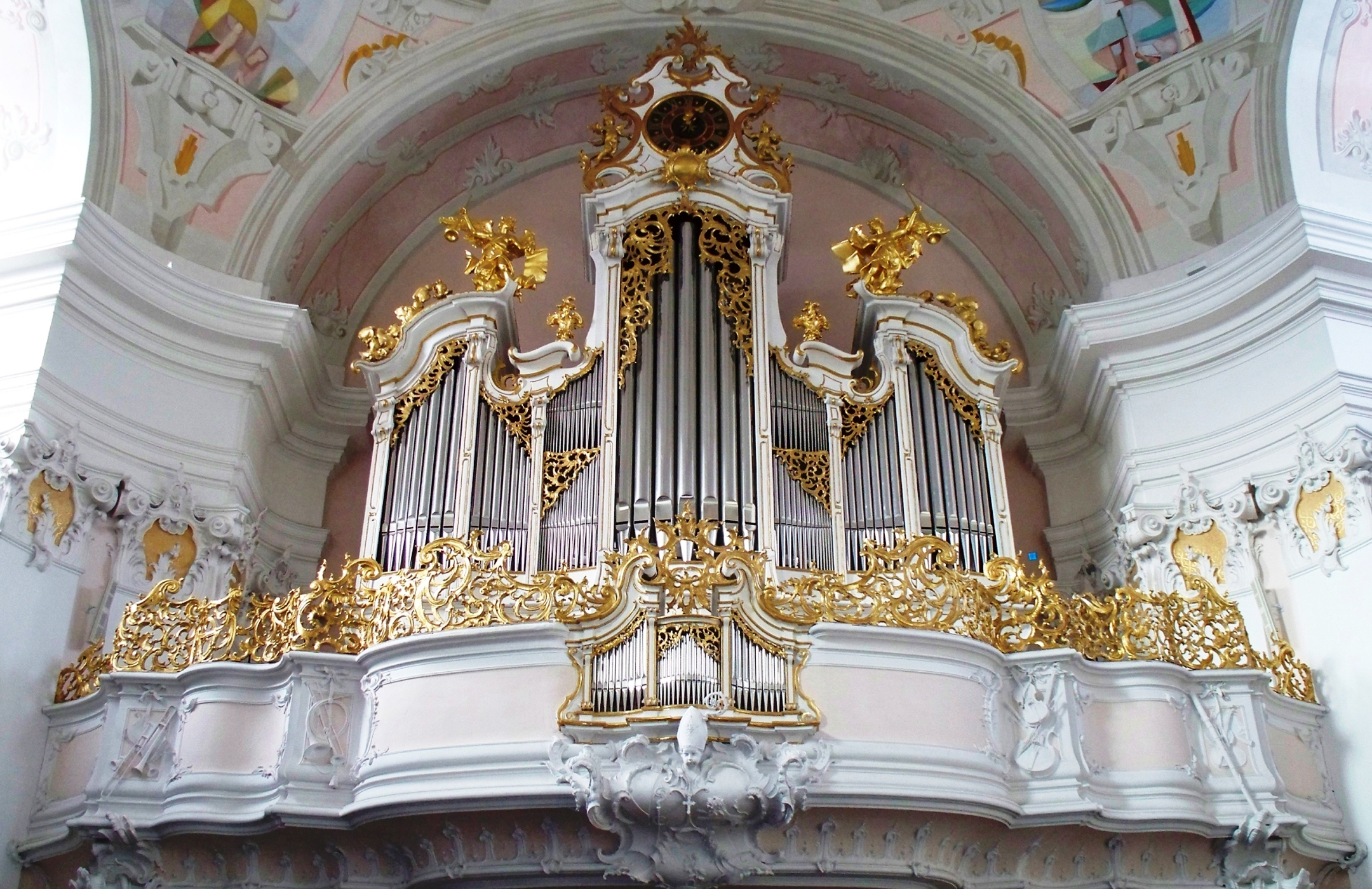
Organ loft

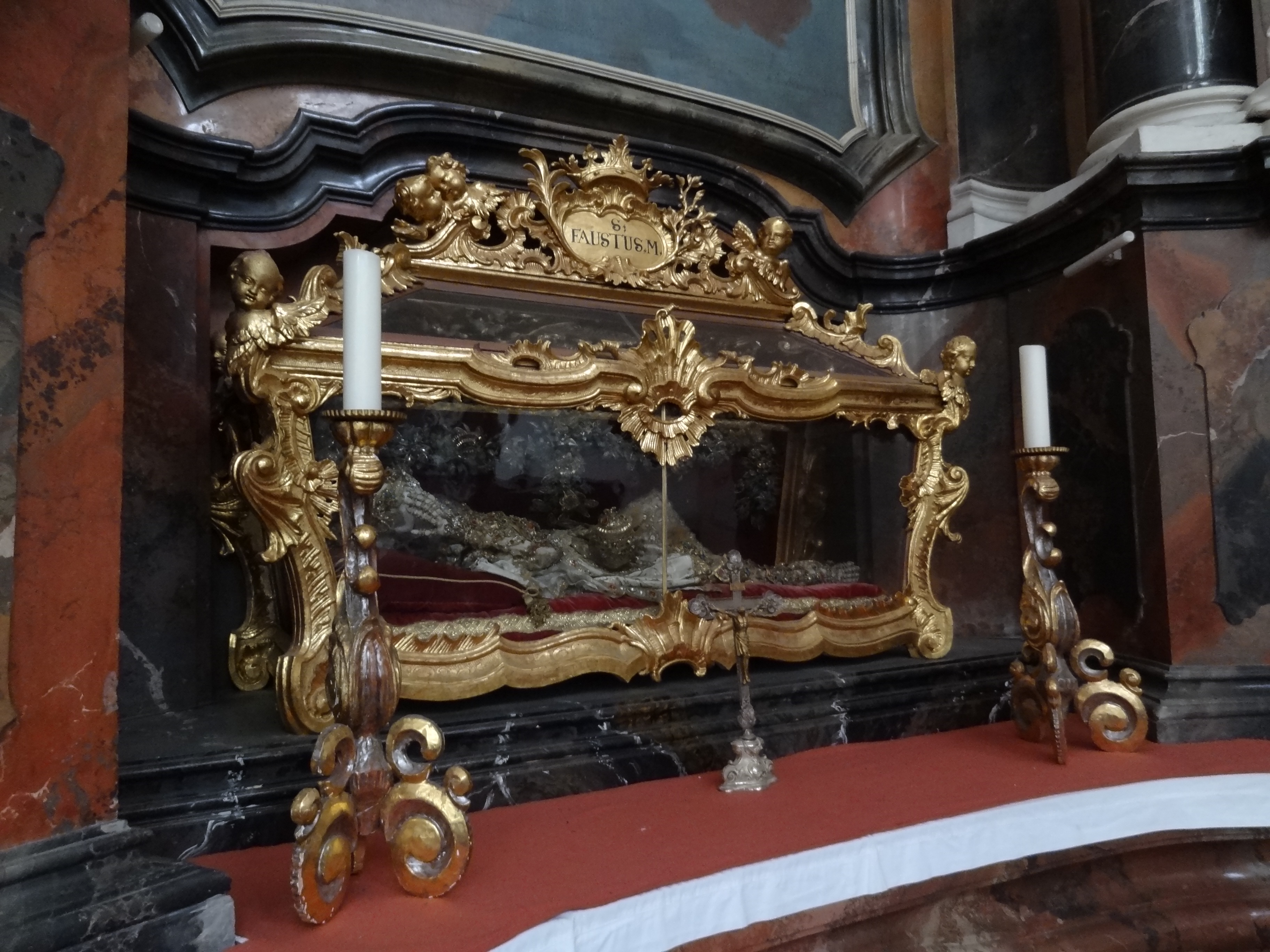
Saint Faustus reliquary

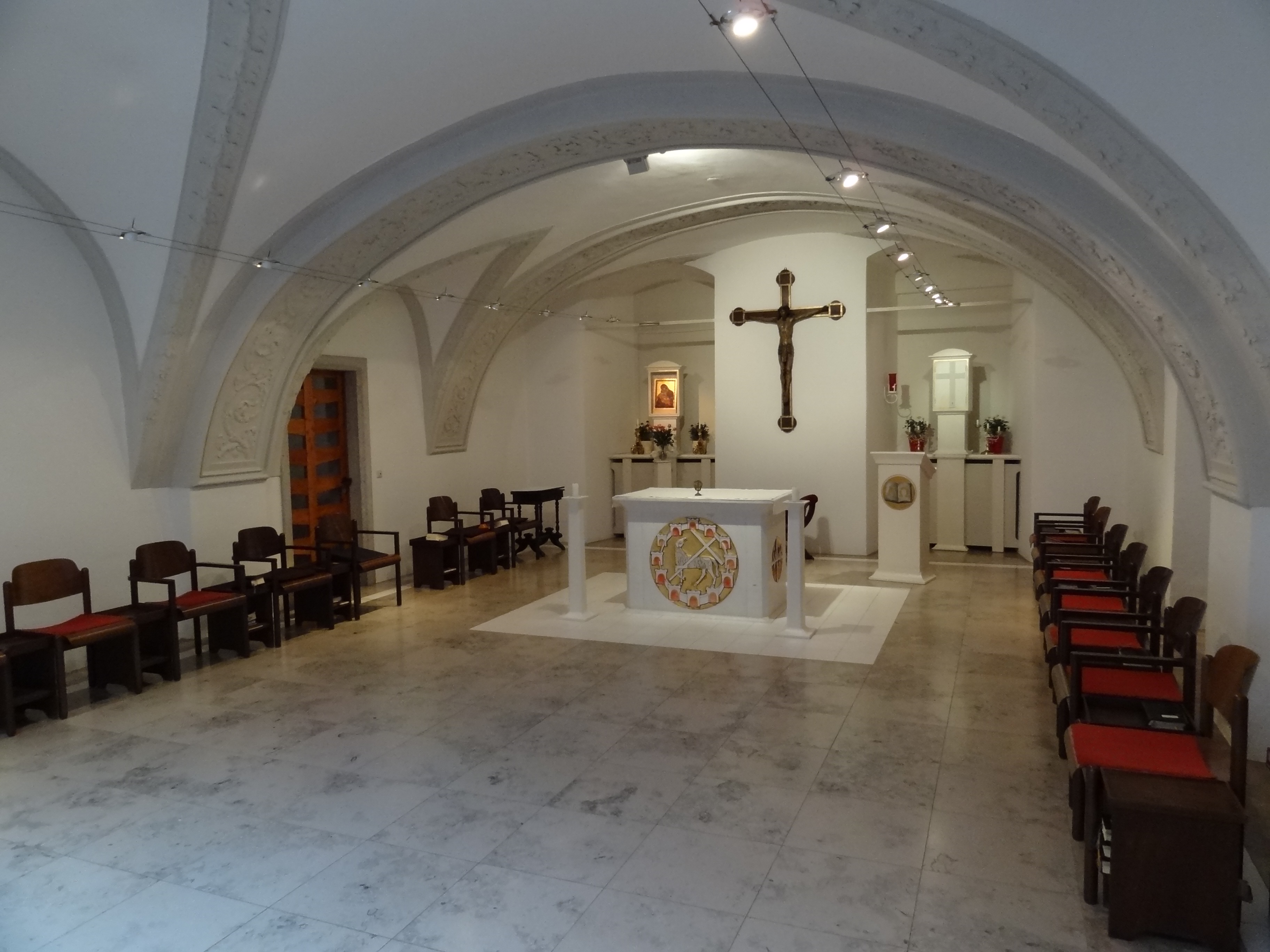
Monastery chapel

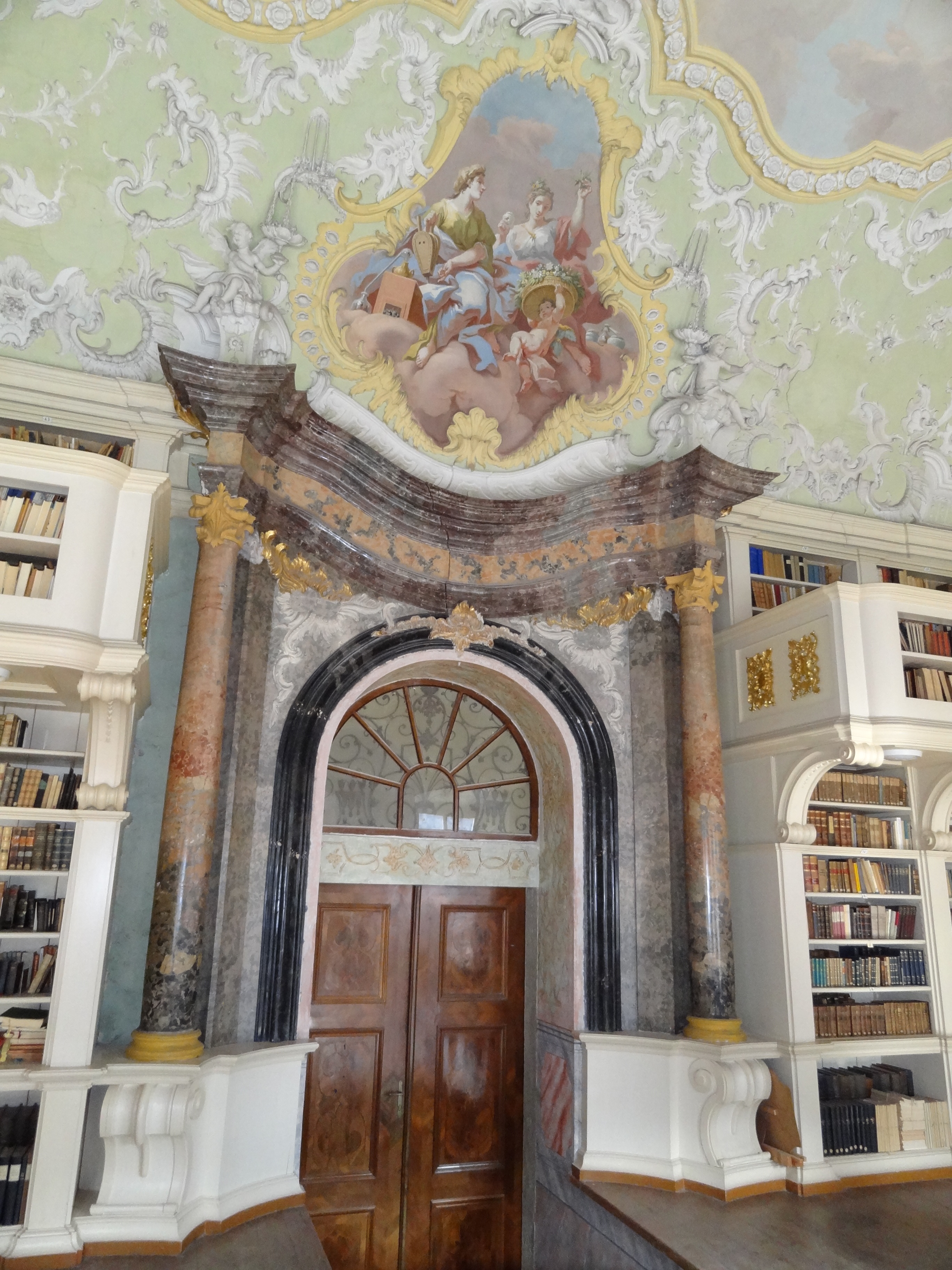
Library

== Economy ==
The monastery lives mostly from its agricultural produce. It has become known both for its liqueurs and for its beer. It currently produces 3 beers on its modern 15HL brewhouse. Nivard, a Belgian Pale Ale; Benno, a dopplebock and Gregorius, a Tripelbock made with local honey.

While it was once also known for its cheese, Engelszeller Trappistenkäse, this is no longer produced.

In May 2012, the International Trappist Association approved Engelszell to be the 9th producer of Trappist beer, and, at the time, only the second outside Belgium.

== List of superiors ==
- Gregorius Eisvogel, 1925–31, prior; 1931–50, abbot
- Basile Sartorio, 1950–51, interim superior
- Bonaventura Diamant, 1951–52, superior ad nutum
- Benno Stumpf, 1952–53, superior ad nutum; 1953–66, abbot
- Willibald Knoll, 1966–83, abbot
- Klaus Jansen, 1982–83, apostolic administrator; 1983–89, abbot
- Nivard Volkmer, 1989–91, superior ad nutum
- Marianus Hauseder, 1991–95, superior ad nutum; from 1995, abbot
