= Tynt Meadow =

Trappist beer from England

Tynt Meadow Trappist Ale
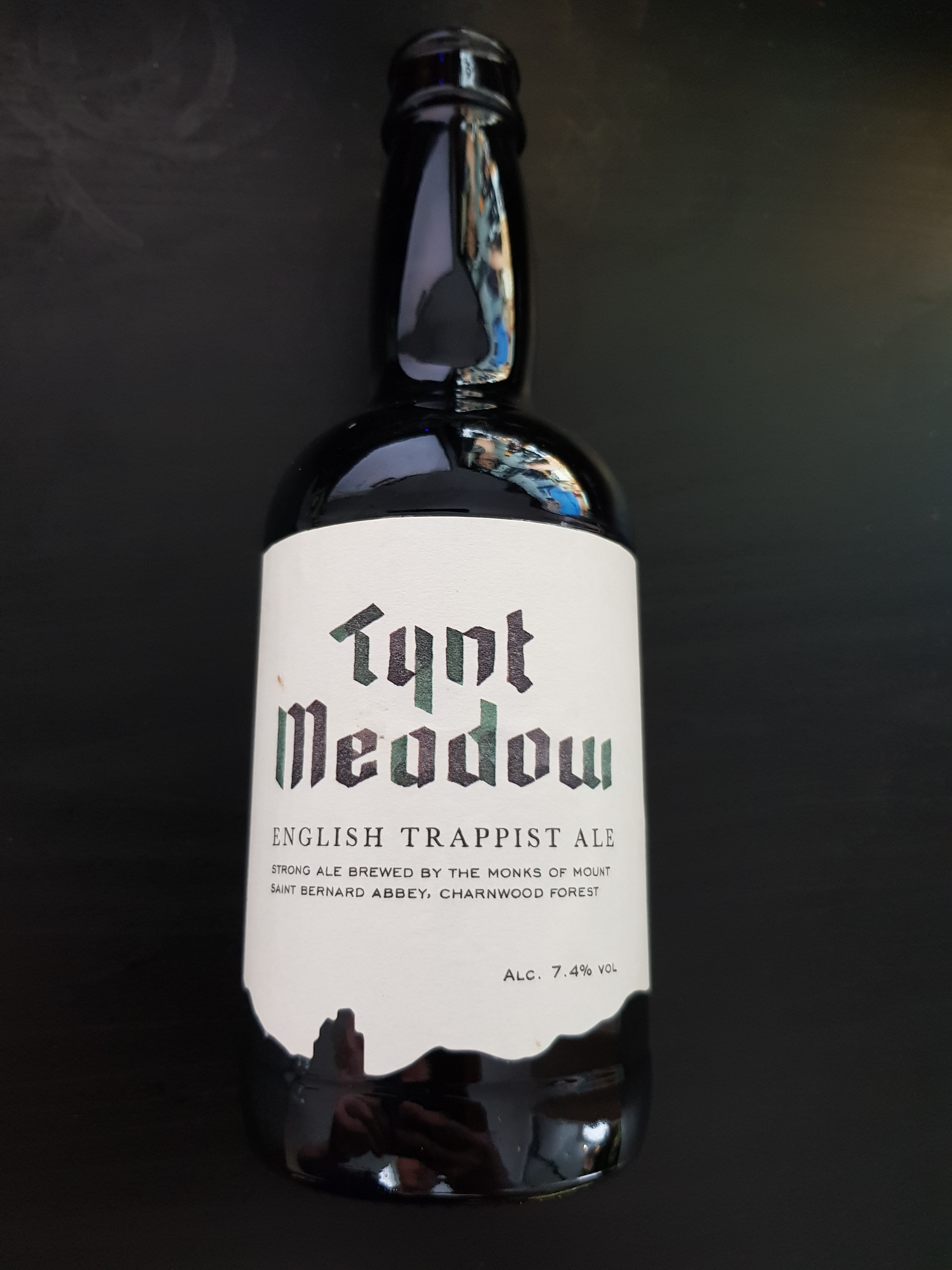
- A bottle of Tynt Meadow
- Type: Strong ale
- Manufacturer: Mount St Bernard Abbey
- Origin: Coalville, Leicestershire, England
- Introduced: 2018
- Alcohol by volume: 7.4%
- Colour: Brown
- Website: www.mountsaintbernard.org

Tynt Meadow is an English Trappist beer with an alcohol content of 7.4%. It is brewed at Mount St Bernard Abbey in Leicestershire.

== Background ==
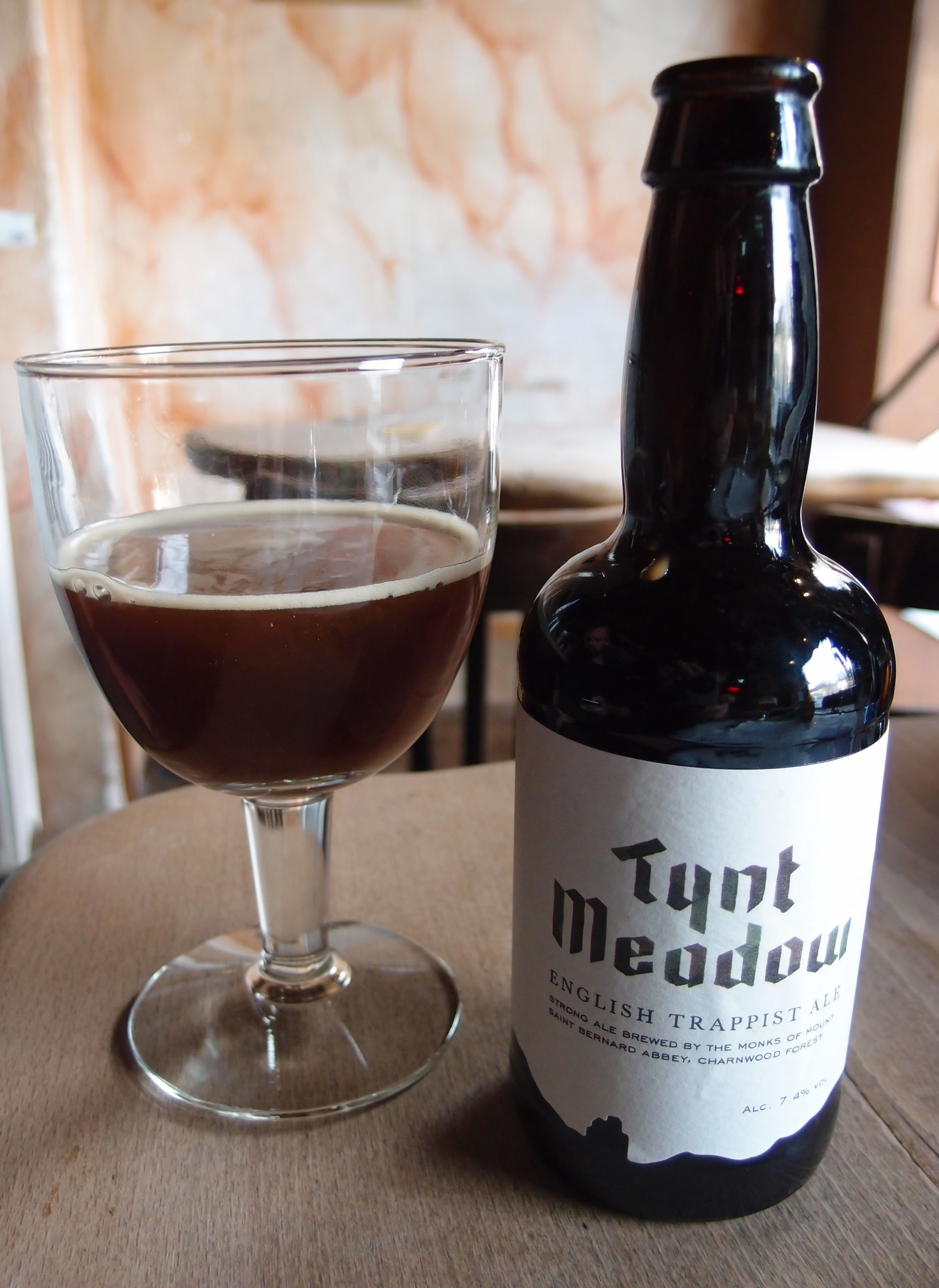
A bottle of Tynt Meadow half poured into a glass

In 2017, the Trappist Mount St Bernard Abbey near Coalville joined the International Trappist Association. A brewery was built in the abbey and in 2018 Tynt Meadow Trappist Ale was released to the market. It received the Authentic Trappist Products label and became the twelfth official Trappist beer.

The beer is named after Tynt Meadow where the history of the abbey began in 1835. St Bernard could not be used as the name of the product due to the rights already being assigned to the Belgian St. Bernardus Brewery.

By 2019, the abbey had produced approximately 30,000 bottles of Tynt Meadow and was struggling to satisfy demand. The beer was said to have become particularly popular in Belgium and the Netherlands. However, as the brewery must remain secondary in importance to the monastery's work and way of life, it was unlikely that demand would be satisfied.
