= Rochefort Brewery =

Belgian brewery

Coordinates: 50°10′41″N 5°13′12″E

Brasserie de Rochefort
- Industry: Trappist brewery
- Founded: 1899
- Headquarters: Rochefort, Belgium
- Products: Beer
- Production output: 18000 hl

Rochefort Brewery (Brasserie de Rochefort) is a Belgian brewery which produces four beers designated as Trappist beers. The brewery is associated with the Rochefort Abbey, a Trappist monastery which originated in the 13th century. The current brewery dates from 1899.

== Brewery ==
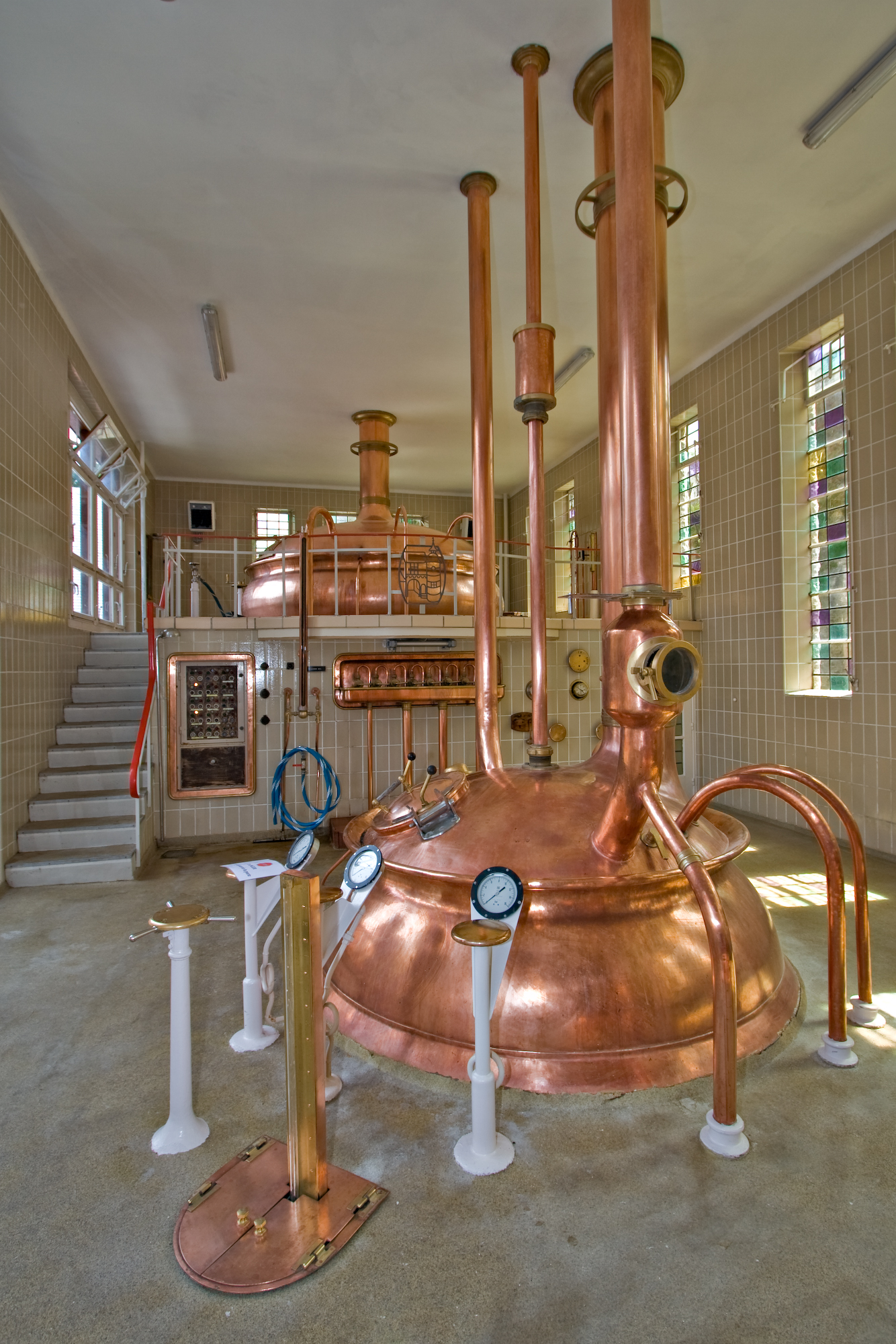
Rochefort Brewery in Rochefort, Belgium

The earliest mention of a brewery at the Trappist monastery of Rochefort Abbey dates from 1595. The abbey and its brewery were closed in 1794. The abbey was re-established in 1887 and the brewery was re-established in 1899. Around fifteen monks currently live at Rochefort Abbey.

The water for the beer is drawn from a well inside the monastery walls. Rochefort uses Pilsener and Munich-type malts, and Hallertau and Golding hops.

== Beers ==
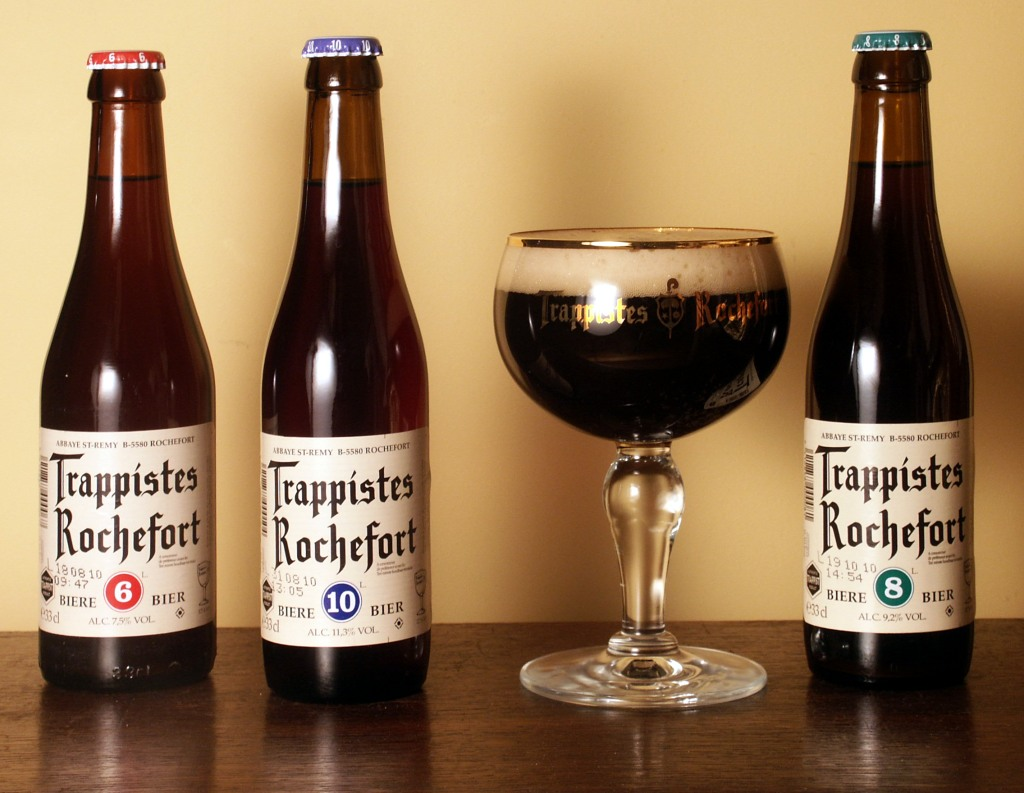
The beers of Rochefort

- Rochefort 6 (red cap, brown beer, 7.5% ABV). Reddish colour, brewed only about once per year, representing approximately 1% of total beer production. This beer begins with a density of 16.5º Plato is 7.5% ABV. "Rochefort 6" is the oldest Rochefort Trappist beer and was brewed empirically until the end of the Second World War. Until 1958, this was the only Rochefort beer that was bottled in both 33 cc bottles and 75 cc bottles. It has a strong malt taste and is slightly bitter.
- Rochefort Triple Extra (purple cap, triple, 8.11% ABV). Golden Blonde colour, launched in October 2020, first in The Netherlands and later in Belgium. According to the monks, they are still finetuning the recipe before releasing it worldwide.
- Rochefort 8 (green cap, brown beer, 9.2% ABV). Yellowish-brown colour, with more fruits and a slight amount of Demi-sec. This variety constitutes the largest proportion of production. Dates from 1955. Originally this beer was only brewed for New Year’s Eve celebrations. "Rochefort 8" begins with a density of 20.8º Plato and reaches a final 9.2% ABV. Due to the overwhelming success of this beer, the monks decided around 1960 to brew it on a regular basis. Sometimes this beer is also referred to as the "Special".
- Rochefort 10 (blue cap, dark beer, 11.3% ABV). Reddish-brown colour, begins with a density of 24.5º Plato and ultimately reaches 11.3% ABV. This is a Belgian Quad with a rich, sweetish taste. Some consider this to be one of the great beers of the world.

The beers are named Rochefort 6, 8, and 10, referring to their gravities in the obsolete (but quite practical) system of Belgian degrees, in which 6 corresponds to an original gravity of 1.060 (15 degrees P), 8 corresponds to 1.080 (20 degrees P), and 10 corresponds to 1.100 (25 degrees P).
