= De Koningshoeven Brewery =

Dutch Trappist brewery

Coordinates: 51°32′36.78″N 5°7′35.82″E

Brouwerij de Koningshoeven
- Industry: Alcoholic beverage
- Founded: 1884
- Headquarters: Berkel-Enschot, Netherlands
- Products: Beer
- Production output: 145,000 hL

De Koningshoeven Brewery (Dutch: Brouwerij de Koningshoeven) is a Dutch Trappist brewery founded in 1884 within the walls of Koningshoeven Abbey in Berkel-Enschot (near Tilburg).

== History ==
In 1884, the abbey opened a brewery inside the monastery in order to finance the monastery and contribute to charitable causes. Despite this goal, the brewery was run as a commercial enterprise. The abbey owned several bars in the area and produced lager under its own "Trappist" brand as well as contract brewing for several private labels. In 1969, the abbey licensed the brewing operations to the Artois Brewery (now InBev). In 1980 the deal with Artois ended, and the monks went back to brewing themselves, this time a top fermented beer which had only been made in limited quantities since the 1950s. Over time the brewery introduced more varieties, first with Dubbel and Tripel in 1987, then in 1992 they introduced Blond. Between 1993 and 2000, the brewery also marketed a beer called Enkel. The brewery also produces the world's only Trappist witbier. The brewery also used to produce the Jopen beer.

The brewery started exporting in 1985, and in 1989 the brewery was modernised.

From 1980 until 1999, the brewery was largely run by the monks. Due to the difficulty of the ageing monks continuing to operate the brewery, a limited liability company was set up as a subsidiary of the large commercial brewer, Bavaria. In 1999 the new company began to take over day-to-day operations, renting the buildings and equipment from the abbey.

As a result of this agreement, a dispute arose with the International Trappist Association, the body that governs the labelling of goods as Trappist. They claimed that this new method of operation was against the regulations that permitted the beer to display the Authentic Trappist Product logo. Whilst the beer continued to be brewed within the abbey walls, the arrangement with Bavaria was felt to be too commercialised. As a result, the brewery withdrew their use of the logo on 1 December 1999. However, the brewery continued to label the beer as Trappistenbier.

After a lengthy study by all parties, and a review of the agreement between the abbey and brewery, the beers were granted the right to display the logo again as of September 9, 2005. As part of this settlement, the monks have taken a more active control of the brewery day-to-day operations, working several hours each day.

== The brewery ==
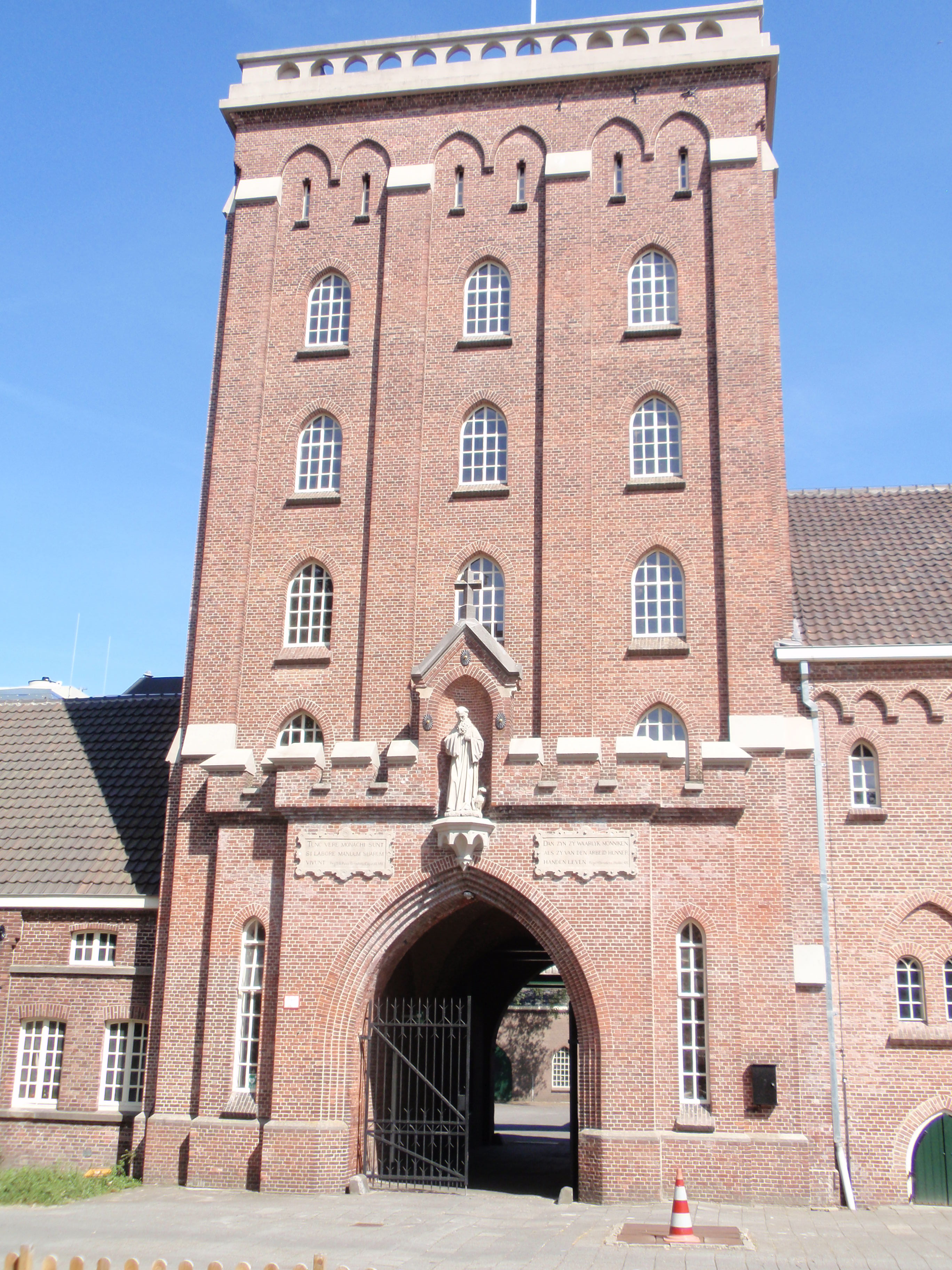
Entrance to the brewery site within the abbey

Of the twelve trappist breweries, this brewery is currently operated by De Koningshoeven NV, a subsidiary of the Bavaria Brewery, but the buildings and equipment are owned by the abbey. The monks of the abbey are the ultimate authority on the brewing process. However, the secular company runs the business operations. The abbey also houses a bar and shop/museum, the latter of which is staffed by a monk.

At times, the brewery has allowed its spare capacity to be used for brewing of other beers. Wieckse Witte and Chimay have at one stage been brewed in the abbey.

As with all other Trappist breweries, the brewery exists in order to finance the monastery, not for profit or any other commercial reason.

Originally the brewery was called De Schaapskooi, and this name is still used casually especially around the region.

== Beers ==
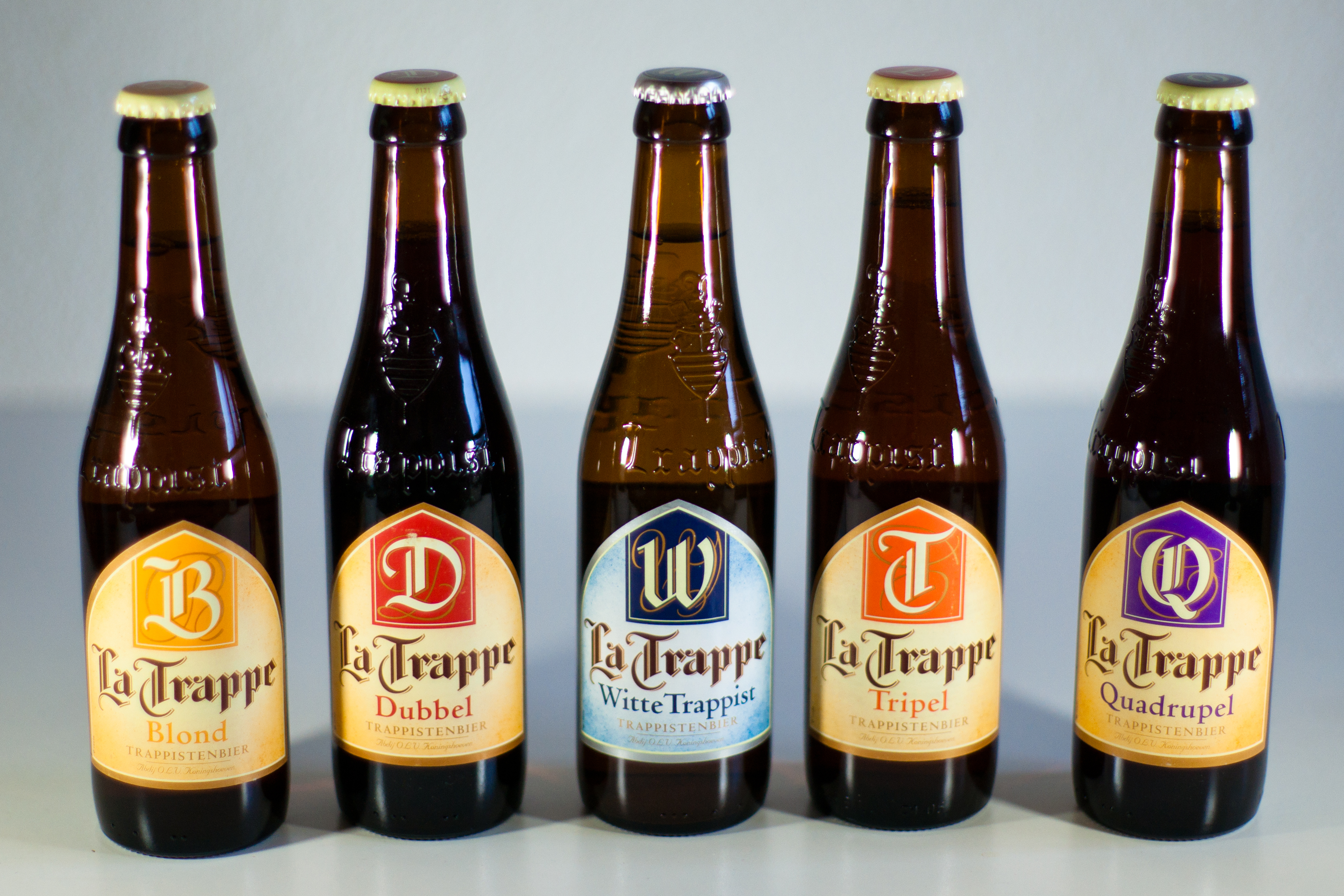
Five of the La Trappe beers: Blond, Dubbel, Witte Trapist, Tripel, Quadrupel

The beers and the brewery are usually marketed under the name La Trappe. However, in some markets, such as the United States, the Koningshoeven name was used until 2010. It is one of five producers of Trappist beer outside Belgium:

- La Trappe Blond (6.5% ABV)
- La Trappe Dubbel (7% ABV)
- La Trappe Isid'or (7.5% ABV)
- La Trappe Tripel (8% ABV)
- La Trappe Quadrupel (10% ABV)
- La Trappe Quadrupel Oak Aged (10% ABV)
- La Trappe Witte Trappist (5.5% ABV)
- La Trappe Bockbier (7% ABV) (Seasonal beer)
- La Trappe PUUR (4.7% ABV) (organic)
- La Trappe Nilis (0.0% ABV) (alcohol free dark)
- La Trappe Epos (0.0% ABV) (alcohol free hazy pale)

Apart from the La Trappe brand, the brewery produces Tilburg's Dutch Brown Ale mainly for export.

The water for the beer is drawn from five 200-metre deep wells on the abbey grounds, and all beers except the Blond are bottle conditioned. The spent grain remaining after the wort is filtered from the mash is used to feed the abbey's own herd of cows.

Originally there was an Enkel which was the monk's table beer, but it was replaced by Blond in the range.
