= Chimay Brewery =

Belgian Trappist brewery

Coordinates: 49°58′55″N 4°20′15″E

Chimay
- Industry: Trappist brewery
- Founded: September 19, 1862; 163 years ago
- Headquarters: Chimay, Belgium
- Products: Beer
- Production output: 123000 hL
- Website: chimay.com

Chimay Brewery (Brasserie de Chimay) is a brewery at Scourmont Abbey, a Trappist monastery in Chimay, Hainaut, Belgium, one of the thirteen breweries worldwide that produce Trappist beer. They make four ales: Chimay Rouge, Chimay Bleue, Chimay Blanche, and Chimay 150; and one patersbier for the monks. The monastery also makes four varieties of cheese.

== Brewery ==
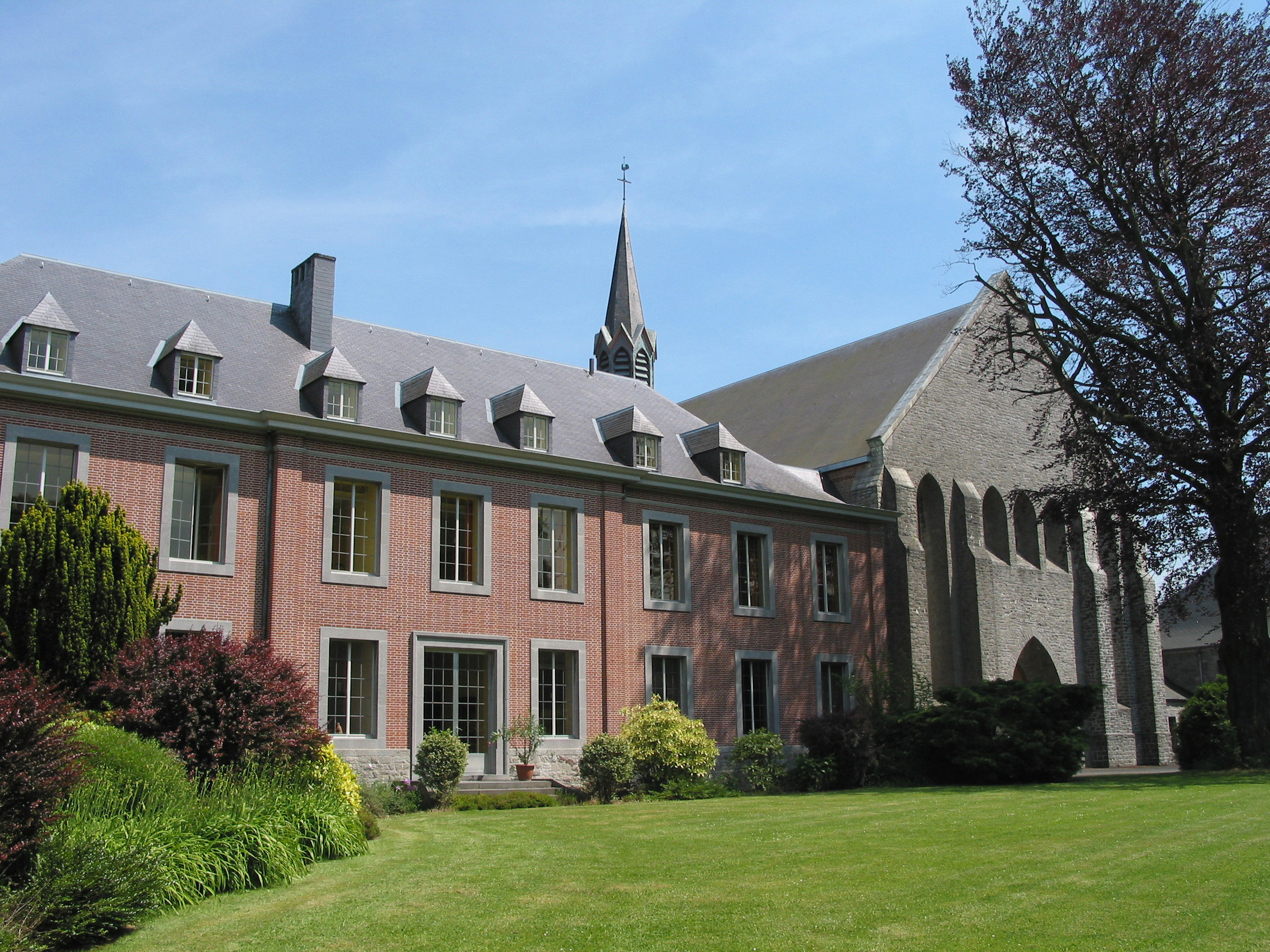
Scourmont Abbey in Chimay, Belgium

The brewery was founded inside Scourmont Abbey, in the Belgian municipality of Forges near Chimay in 1862.

The brewery produces four ales as well as a patersbier for the monks themselves which is occasionally sold as Chimay Gold; they are known as Trappist beers because they are made in a Trappist monastery. It was the first brewery to use the Trappist Ale designation on its labels.

As with all other Trappist breweries, the beer is sold only for financial support of the monastery and good causes. The brewery business pays rent for use of the property within the abbey, which is used to support the monastic community. The majority of the profit from the sale of the beer is distributed to charities and for community development around the region. As of 2007, sales figures for Chimay products exceeded $50 million per year.

The water for the beers is drawn from a well located inside the monastery walls. The filtered solids from the beer mash are recycled into livestock feed which is given to the same cows that produce the milk for Chimay cheeses.

The beer is transported from the monastery to the bottling plant 12 km away, which can fill 40,000 bottles per hour, of which many are returns. The beer is then refermented in the bottle for three weeks before being shipped around the world. 50% of Chimay beer production is sold on the export markets.

The brewing plant was updated in 1988, and as of 2005 produced 12 megalitres annually.

== Beers ==
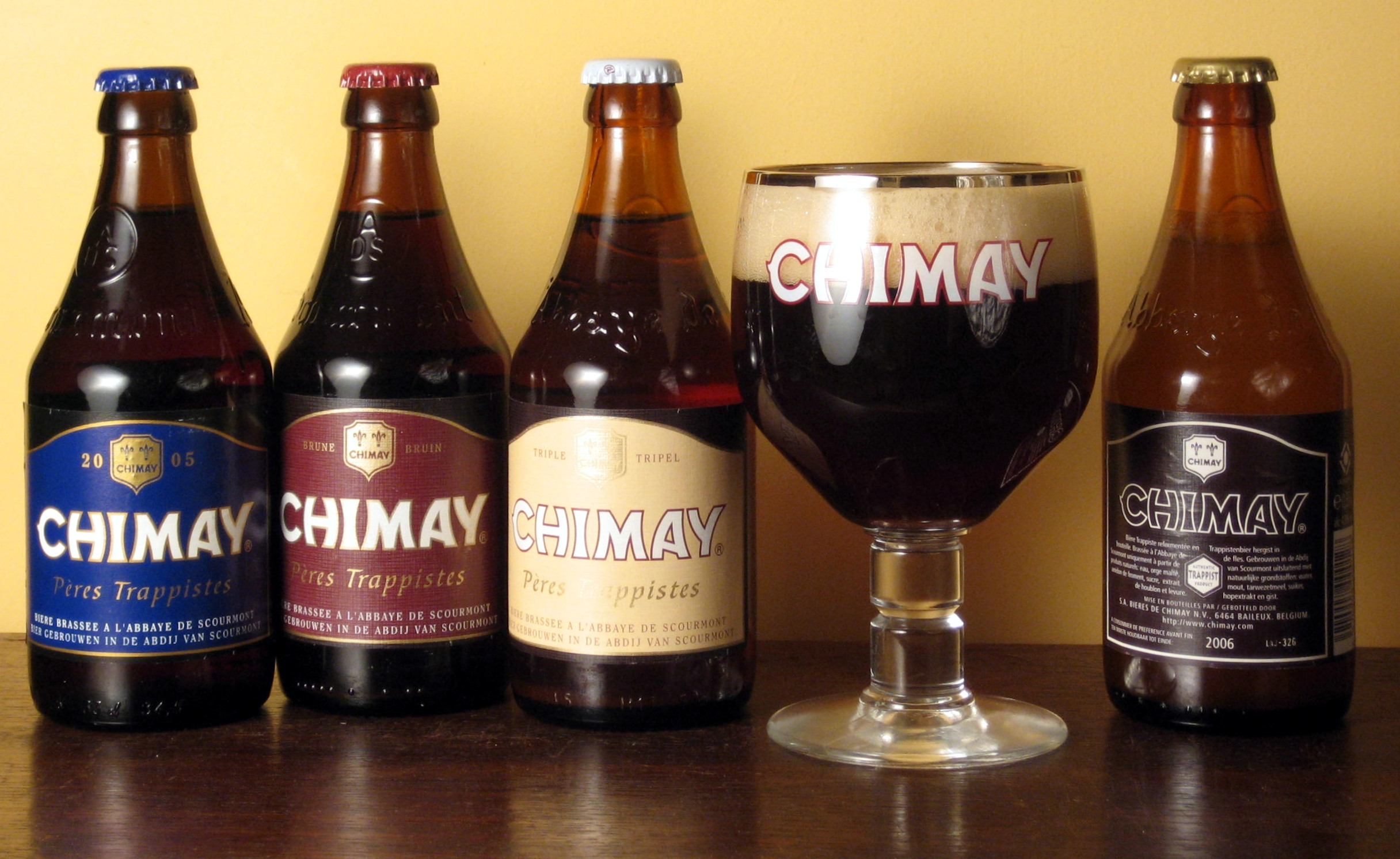
Four varieties of Chimay, with Chimay Blue in the glass.

The ingredients are: water, malted barley, wheat starch, sugar, hop extract and yeast; malt extract is used in Rouge and Bleue for colouring.

- Chimay Red, 7% ABV. In the 75 cl bottle, it is known as Première. It is a dark brown colour dubbel and has a sweet, fruity aroma.
- Chimay Blue, 9% ABV darker ale. In the 75 cl bottle, it is known as Grande Réserve. This copper-brown beer has a light creamy head and a slightly bitter taste. Considered to be the "classic" Chimay ale, it exhibits a considerable depth of fruity, peppery character.
- Chimay Triple (white label) 8% ABV golden tripel. In the 75 cl bottle, it is known as Cinq Cents. This crisp beer bears a light orange colour, and is the most hopped and driest of the three.
- Chimay 150, 10% ABV blonde ale. Originally brewed as a special, 150th anniversary ale, now in regular production. Noted for its spicy, smoky character.
- Chimay Dorée (Golden), 4.8% ABV ale, brewed from very similar ingredients as the Red, but more pale and spiced differently. It is a patersbier, intended only to be drunk at the Abbey. Since 2007 it was available at the nearby inn Auberge de Poteaupré, which is associated with the abbey. The monks themselves drink this variety rather than the stronger three. Prior to 2015, it was unusual for bottles of the Chimay Dorée to be available outside the Abbey or local inn. However, from 2013, a limited quantity of this beer was sold on draught in the United Kingdom, at 19 Fuller's pubs and in Italy, where only 50 pubs sell this variety of beer, as well as in 330 ml bottles in some export markets. In the Christmas season of 2016, Chimay made available a gift set with all four varieties and two chalices, and since has been available in limited quantities in the USA.

== Cheeses ==
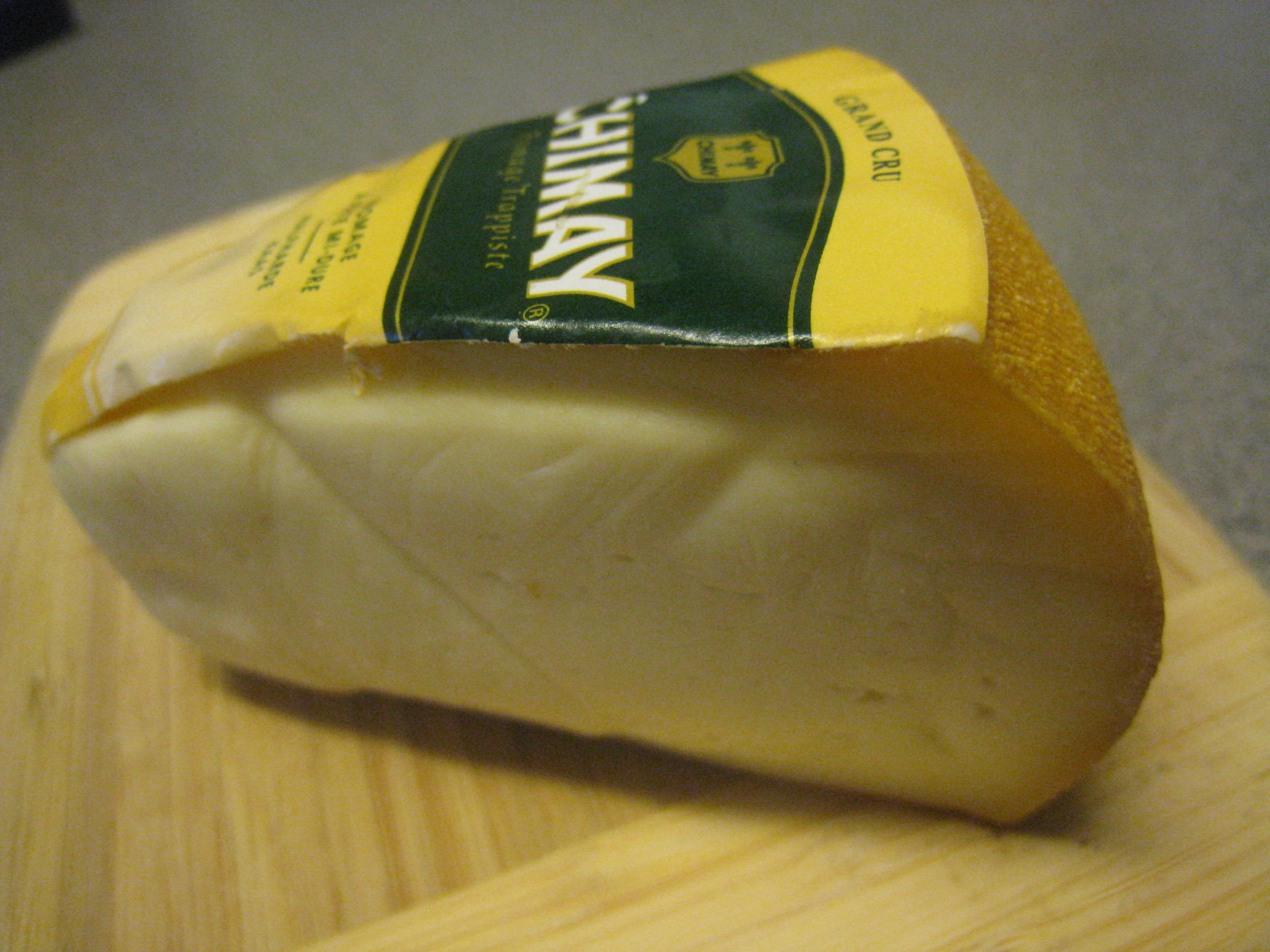
Chimay's Grand Cru cheese

Since 1876 the monastery has also made cheese, and as of 2010 offers four cheeses.

They are:

- Chimay with Beer, whose rind is soaked in Chimay beer.
- Chimay Grand Classic, a semi-hard pressed cheese.
- Chimay Grand Cru, made from pasteurised milk and matured for six weeks.
- Old Chimay, a hard cheese matured for at least six months.
