= Orval Brewery =

Belgian Trappist brewery

Coordinates: 49°38′22″N 5°20′55″E

Brasserie d'Orval
- Industry: Trappist brewery Trappist cheesefarm
- Founded: 1931
- Founder: Notre-Dame d'Orval Abbey
- Headquarters: Orval Abbey, Wallonia, Belgium
- Number of locations: 1
- Products: Beer
- Production output: 77,000 hL
- Website: http://www.orval.be

Orval Brewery (French: Brasserie d'Orval) is a Trappist brewery within the walls of the Abbaye Notre-Dame d'Orval in the Gaume region of Belgium.

The brewery produces two Trappist beers, Orval, which is sold commercially, and Orval Vert, which is only available at the abbey.

== History ==
Evidence of brewing goes back to the earliest days of the monastery. A document written by the abbot in 1628 directly refers to the consumption of beer and wine by the monks. The last of the brewers to be a monk was Brother Pierre, up until the 1793 fire.

In 1931 the present day brewery became in use, employing lay people and intended to provide a source of funds for the monastery reconstruction. The new abbey was designed by Henry Vaes, who also designed the distinctive Orval beer glass, together with his daughter. The first beer was shipped from the brewery on 7 May 1932, and was sold in barrels rather than the bottles of today. Orval was the first Trappist beer to be sold nationally around Belgium.

As with other Trappist breweries, the beer is sold in order to financially support the monastery and some other good causes. All of the profits from the sale of the beer are distributed to charities and for community development around the region.

== Beers ==
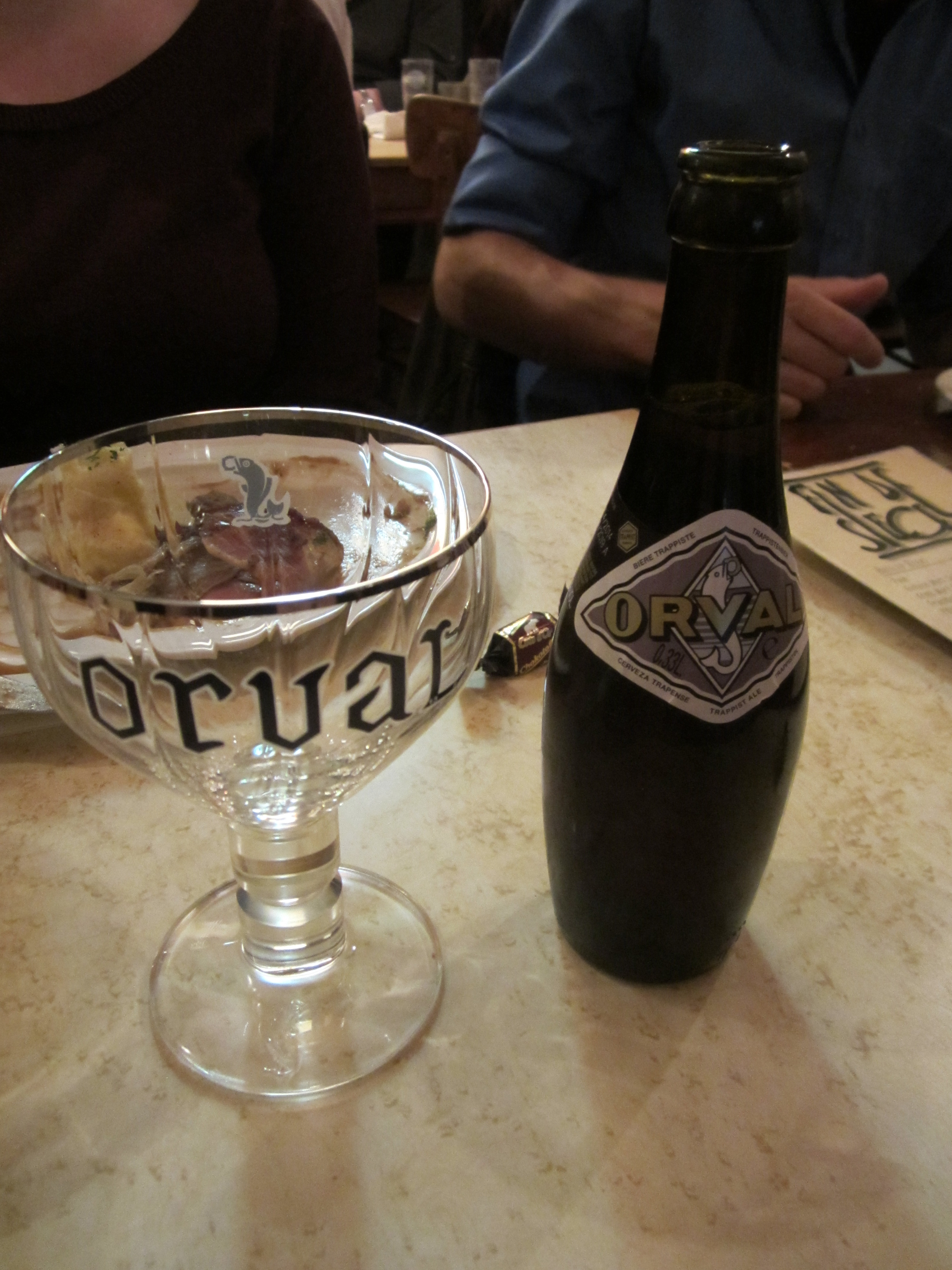
Orval Trappist Ale bottle with traditional glass

Orval is the main brand. Depending on age, its alcohol by volume varies from 5.9% to 7.2%. Bottles are normally labelled with the average 6.2%, but to meet North American legal requirements they must there be labelled with the maximum 6.9%. It was first made in 1931, and has a complex and unusual flavour and aroma produced by a specific strain of yeast: Brettanomyces bruxellensis. The beer is light in colour, slightly cloudy, and has a large, foamy head. There is a complex aroma of leather, spice, and many other earthy components.

Beer critic Michael Jackson considered Orval to be "a wonderful aperitif", and a "world classic". Its very distinctive taste is largely attributed to two parts of the brewing process. One of these is the use of dry hopping, in which large meshed bags of hops infuse the beer during the three-week maturation period. The other is the use of Brettanomyces yeast during this same maturation, which is a local wild yeast. Hallertau, Styrian Goldings and French Strisselspalt hops are used.

Orval beer is bottled exclusively in a distinctive skittle shaped 33 cl bottle. The bottling plant has a capacity of 24,000 bottles per hour. The beer is then matured at 15 °C for a minimum of four weeks on site before being distributed. Beer that will be sold at the Abbey or local cafe is matured for six months. As the beer is bottle conditioned, its flavour can evolve over the years with aging.

Orval Vert, also known as Petit Orval, is a 4.5% abv, available only on tap in the café near the monastery.

== Brewery ==
The brewery is normally closed to the public, but opens its doors for two days each year. There are presently 32 secular workers.
