= Trappist beer =

Beer brewed by Trappist monks

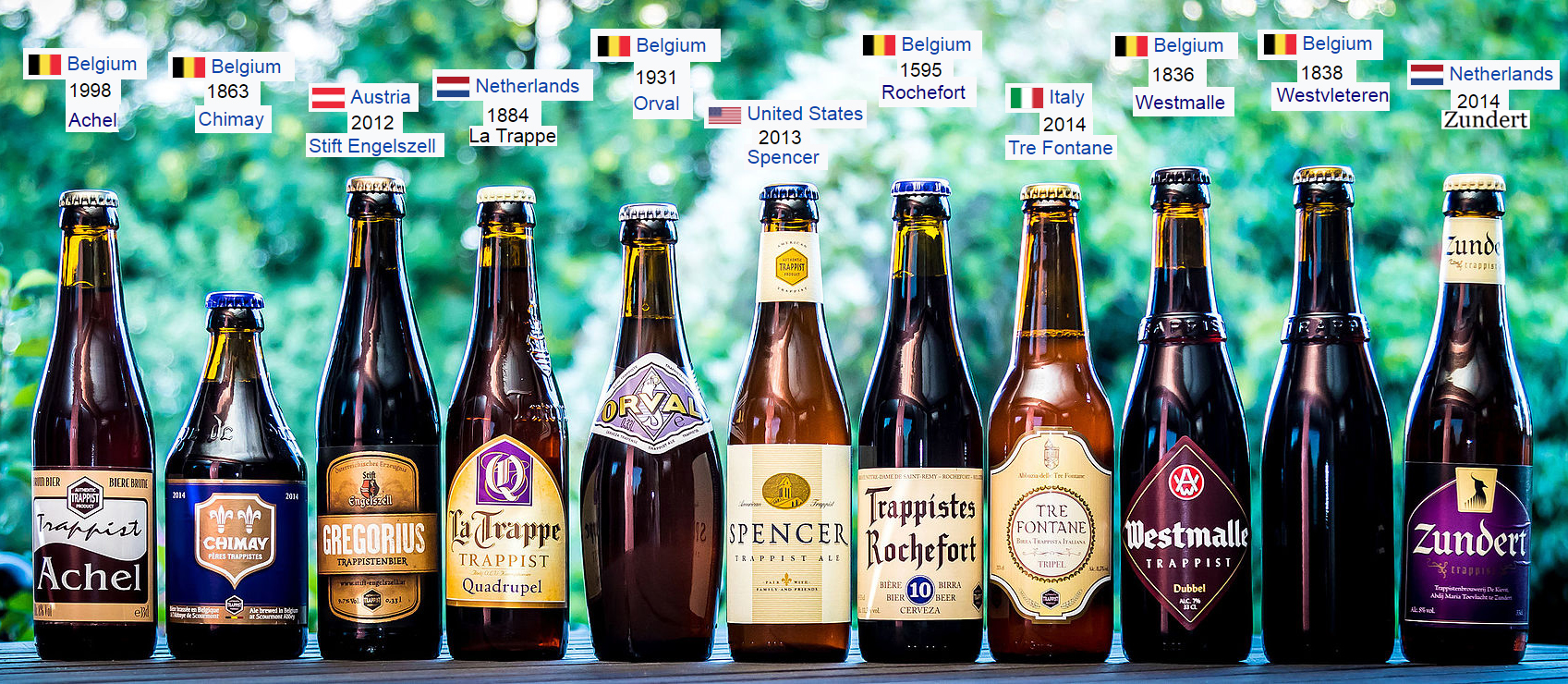
Beers with Authentic Trappist Product label from Trappist breweries in 2015: Achel, Chimay, Engelszell, La Trappe, Orval, Spencer, Rochefort, Tre Fontane, Westmalle, Westvleteren, and Zundert (not pictured: Mount St Bernard Abbey)

Trappist beer is brewed by Trappist monks. Thirteen Trappist monasteries—six in Belgium, two in the Netherlands, and one each in Italy, England, France, and Spain— produce beer, but the Authentic Trappist Product label is assigned by the International Trappist Association (ITA) to just ten breweries that meet their strict criteria. As of 2021, Achel is no longer recognized as a Trappist brewery because it does not have any monks.

== History ==
The Catholic Trappist order originated in the Cistercian monastery of La Trappe, France. Various Cistercian congregations existed for many years, and by 1664 the abbot of La Trappe felt that the Cistercians were becoming too liberal. He introduced strict new rules in the abbey and the Strict Observance was born. Since this time, many of the rules have been relaxed. However, a fundamental tenet that monasteries should be self-supporting is still maintained by these groups.

Monastery brewhouses, from different religious orders, have existed across Europe since the Middle Ages. From the very beginning, beer was brewed in French Cistercian monasteries following the Strict Observance. For example, the monastery of La Trappe in Soligny already had its own brewery in 1685. Breweries were later introduced in monasteries of other countries as the Trappist order spread from France into the rest of Europe. The Trappists, like many other religious orders, originally brewed beer to feed the community, in a show of self-sufficiency. Nowadays, Trappist breweries also brew beer to fund their works and charitable causes. Many of the Trappist monasteries and breweries were destroyed during the French Revolution and the World Wars.

In 1997, eight Trappist abbeys – six from Belgium (Orval, Chimay, Westvleteren, Rochefort, Westmalle and Achel), one from the Netherlands (Koningshoeven) and one from Germany (Mariawald) – founded the International Trappist Association (ITA) to prevent non-Trappist commercial companies from abusing the Trappist name. This private association created a logo that is assigned to goods (cheese, beer, wine, etc.) that respect precise production criteria. For the beers, these criteria were the following:

- The beer must be brewed within the walls of a Trappist monastery, either by the monks themselves or under their supervision.
- The brewery must be of secondary importance within the monastery and it should witness to the business practices proper to a monastic way of life.
- The brewery is not intended to be a profit-making venture. The income covers the living expenses of the monks and the maintenance of the buildings and grounds. Whatever remains is donated to charity for social work and to help persons in need.

As of January 2021, Belgium has only five Trappist beers (ATP) left since Achel lost its ATP designation due to the last monk leaving the Order. However, its beer production is still ongoing and has been taken over by Westmalle. In 2012, Bpost honored the Trappist breweries in the country with a commemorative collection of stamps. In January 2023, Achel lost its designation as a Trappist beer due to selling the abbey to a private person.

In the 20th century, the growing popularity of Trappist beers led some brewers with no connection to the order to label their beers "Trappist". After unsuccessful negotiations, monks sued one such brewer in 1962 in Ghent, Belgium.

The Dutch brewery De Koningshoeven produces Trappist beers – branded La Trappe – that are able to carry the "Authentic Trappist Product" logo. Their use of the International Trappist Association logo was withdrawn in 1999, but was restored in October 2005 (see Brouwerij de Koningshoeven for details). A second Dutch Trappist beer, branded Zundert and produced by Abdij Maria Toevlucht, made its debut in December 2013, and has also been granted permission to use the International Trappist Association logo.

An expansion of ITA-recognized breweries took place for the first time in 2012 when the trappist brewery of the abbey of Trappistenbrauerei Engelszell in Engelhartszell, Austria, started brewing beer at the monastery (the former production had stopped in 1929) and in the same year obtained the Authentic Trappist Product logo for their beer.

In December 2013, Maria Toevlucht's Abbey (Zundert, the Netherlands) and St. Joseph's Abbey (Spencer, Massachusetts, United States) were both granted the ATP recognition for their Trappist beers, followed in 2015 by Tre Fontane Abbey brewery in Rome.

In June 2018, the monks of Mount Saint Bernard Abbey in Leicestershire became the first in the UK to brew a Trappist ale. Called "Tynt Meadow" (7.4% ABV), after the location of the abbey, it is available to visitors and sold through public outlets.

On May 13, 2025, a press release announced that Zundert abbey and brewery would close permanently after the summer of 2025. The monks would move to other abbeys.

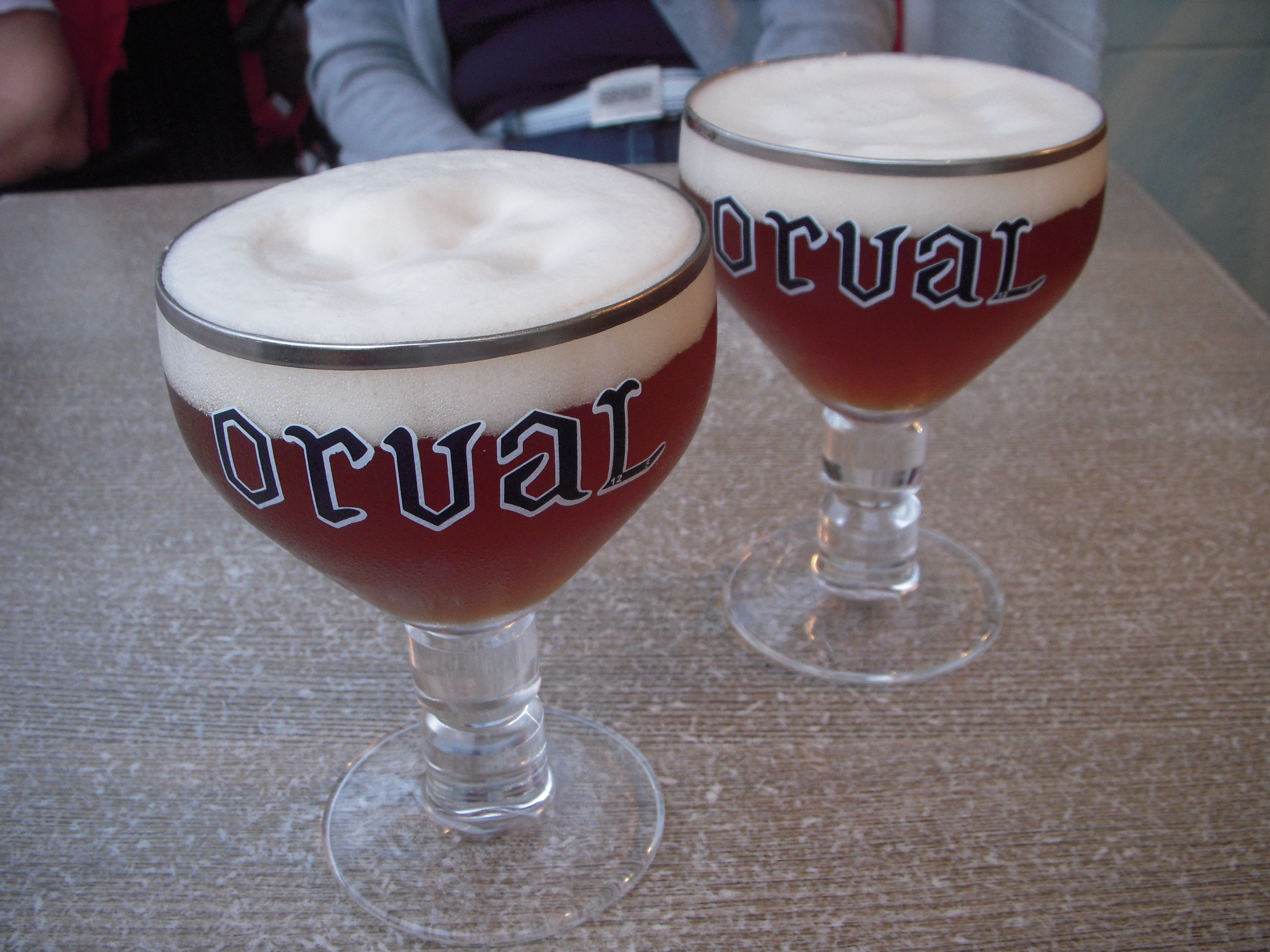
Orval trappist beer

== International Trappist Association recognised breweries ==
=== Authentic Trappist Product label ===
In addition to being a Trappist brewery, the monastic communities that are members of the ITA can apply for the Authentic Trappist Product (ATP) label. The following criteria are used for ATP label:

- All products must be made within the immediate surroundings of the abbey;
- Production must be carried out under the supervision of the monks or nuns;
- Profits should be intended for the needs of the monastic community, for purposes of solidarity within the Trappist Order, or for development projects and charitable works.

=== List of Trappist breweries ===
There are currently thirteen breweries producing Trappist beer. Ten of them (with the exception of Achel, Mont des Cats, whose beer is not brewed at their monastery but at Chimay, and Cardeña from the Abbey of San Pedro de Cardeña, whose beer is currently produced off-site) are allowed to display the Authentic Trappist Product logo on their beer products. In January 2021, "Achel" of the St. Benedict's Abbey in Hamont-Achel lost the Authentic Trappist Product label, as the brewing process was no longer supervised by monks on site, but the beer remains a Trappist beer, as the Saint Benedict Abbey falls under the Westmalle Abbey and the abbot of Westmalle Abbey visits the Achelse Kluis every week and supervises the brewing and other activities in the Achelse Kluis. In January 2023, the abbey was sold to a private person. From that day on, "Achel" lost the recognition as a Trappist beer. In May 2022, St. Joseph's Abbey ceased beer production. In May 2023, Stift Engelszell published an article about dissolution of the monastery and move all monks to other monasteries.

International Trappist Association recognized breweries
Brewery	Location	Opened	Annual production (2004)
Brouwerij der Trappisten van Westmalle	Belgium	1836	120,000 hL (100,000 US bbl)
Brouwerij Westvleteren (St Sixtus)	Belgium	1838	4,750 hL (4,050 US bbl)
Bières de Chimay	Belgium	1863	123,000 hL (105,000 US bbl)
Brouwerij de Koningshoeven (La Trappe)	Netherlands	1884	145,000 hL (124,000 US bbl)
Brasserie de Rochefort	Belgium	1899	18,000 hL (15,000 US bbl)
Brasserie d'Orval	Belgium	1931	71,000 hL (61,000 US bbl)
Stift Engelszell	Austria	2012 (closed 2023)	2,000 hL (1,700 US bbl)
St. Joseph's Abbey in Spencer, Massachusetts Closed in 2022	United States	2013 (closed 2022)	4,694 hL (4,000 US bbl)
Brouwerij Abdij Maria Toevlucht (Zundert)	Netherlands	2013 (closed 2025)	5,000 hL (4,300 US bbl)
Tre Fontane Abbey	Italy	2015	2,000 hL (1,700 US bbl)
Mount St Bernard Abbey (Tynt Meadow)	England	2018	2,000 hL (1,700 US bbl)
Mont des Cats (not ATP)	France	1826	N/A (not ATP)
Cerveza Cardeña Trappist (not ATP)	Spain	2016	N/A (not ATP)
Achel Abbey Recognition as Trappist beer lost in 2023 (abbey sold to a private individual)	Belgium	1850	N/A (not ATP)

International Trappist Association recognised breweries in the world
International Trappist Association recognised breweries in the Low Countries

== Abbey beer ==
The designation "abbey beers" (Bières d'Abbaye or Abdijbier) was originally devised by Belgian breweries for any monastic or monastic-style beer not produced in an actual monastery. After the introduction of an official Trappist beer designation by the International Trappist Association in 1997, it came to mean products similar in style or presentation to monastic beers. In other words, an Abbey beer may be:

- Produced by a non-Trappist monastery—e.g. non-Trappist Cistercian or Benedictine; or
- produced by a commercial brewery under an arrangement with an extant monastery; or
- branded with the name of a defunct or fictitious abbey by a commercial brewer; or
- given a vaguely monastic branding, without specifically mentioning monastery, by a commercial brewer.

== Types of beer ==
Trappist beers are mostly top-fermented, including La Trappe Bockbier, and mainly bottle conditioned. Trappist breweries use various systems of nomenclature for the different beers produced which relate to their relative strength.

The best known is the system where different beers are called Enkel/Single, Dubbel/Double, Tripel/Triple and Quadrupel/Quadruple. These terms roughly describe both the amount of malt and the original gravity. They may refer to the number of crosses or other marks chalked on the casks - two for a Dubbel and three for a Tripel.

Colours can be used to indicate the different types, dating back to the days when bottles were unlabelled and had to be identified by the capsule or bottle-top alone. Chimay beer labels are based on the colour system (in increasing order of strength red, white and blue). Westvleteren beers are still unlabelled.

There is also a number system (6, 8 and 10, as used by Rochefort), which gives an indication of strength, but is not necessarily an exact alcohol by volume (ABV). Achel combine a strength and a colour (of the beer itself—blond or brown) designation.

=== Enkel ===
Enkel, meaning "single", is a term used by the Trappist breweries to describe the basic recipe of their beers. The term is often used interchangeably with patersbier (meaning father's beer), as Enkels are a weak beer brewed originally to be consumed by the monks themselves. The name fell out of fashion with no breweries (Trappist or 'Abbey') using the term until the 2010s. Instead, "Blond(e)" (La Trappe, Westvleteren), "5" (Achel) or "6" (Rochefort) have been used to describe the brewery's lightest beer. Chimay introduced an Enkel (called Dorée or Gold) commercially in bottles in 2015, Westmalle made their Enkel (called Extra) available commercially through some outlets in 2010.

=== Dubbel ===
Dubbel is a Trappist breweries' naming convention. The origin of the dubbel was a beer brewed in the Trappist Abbey of Westmalle in 1856. Westmalle Dubbel was imitated by other breweries, Trappist and commercial, Belgian and worldwide, leading to the emergence of a style. Dubbels are understood to be a fairly strong (6–8% ABV) brown ale, with understated bitterness, fairly heavy body, and a pronounced fruitiness and cereal character. Examples are: Westmalle Dubbel, Chimay Red/Premiere, Koningshoeven/La Trappe Dubbel, Achel 8 Bruin, Rochefort 6, and Tynt Meadow.

=== Tripel ===
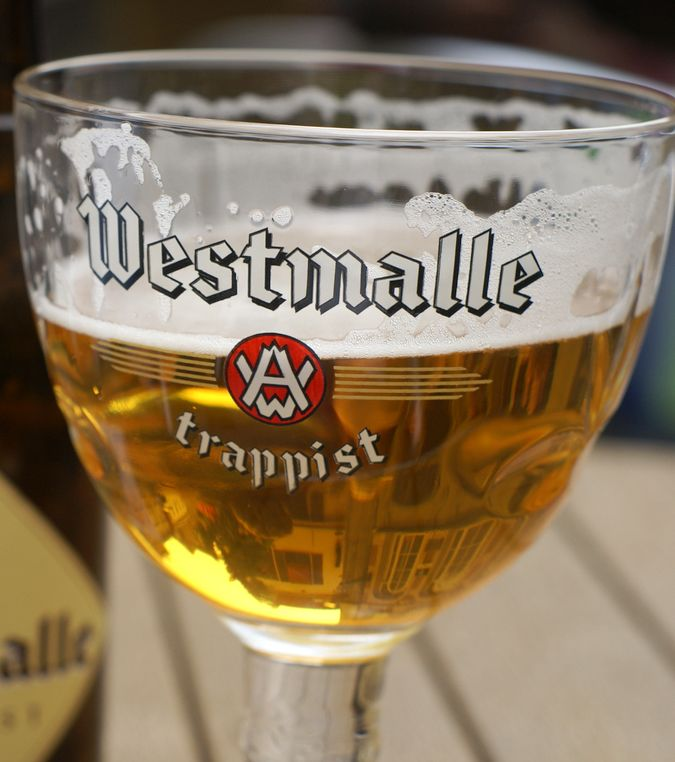
Westmalle Tripel

Tripel is a naming convention traditionally used by Belgian Trappist breweries to describe the strongest beer in their range. Westmalle Tripel is considered to be the foundation of this beer style, and was developed in the 1930s. Achel 8 Blond, Westmalle Tripel, La Trappe Tripel, and Chimay White/Cinq Cents are all examples of Trappist tripels. The style has proven popular among secular breweries like St. Feuillien, Bosteels and St. Bernardus. Tripels as a style are generally beers with an alcohol content ranging from 8% to 10% ABV.

=== Quadrupel ===
Quadrupel is the name Koningshoeven gave to a La Trappe ale they brew which is stronger and darker than their tripel. Rochefort 10, Westvleteren 12 and Zundert 10 are also examples of quadrupels.

== Glassware ==
Belgian breweries have a tradition of providing custom beer glasses: with Trappist breweries, these often take the form of "chalice" or "goblet" style glasses. The distinction between goblet and chalice is typically in the glass thickness. Goblets tend to be more delicate and thin, while the chalice is heavy and thick walled. Some chalices are etched on the bottom to nucleate a stream of bubbles for maintaining a nice head.

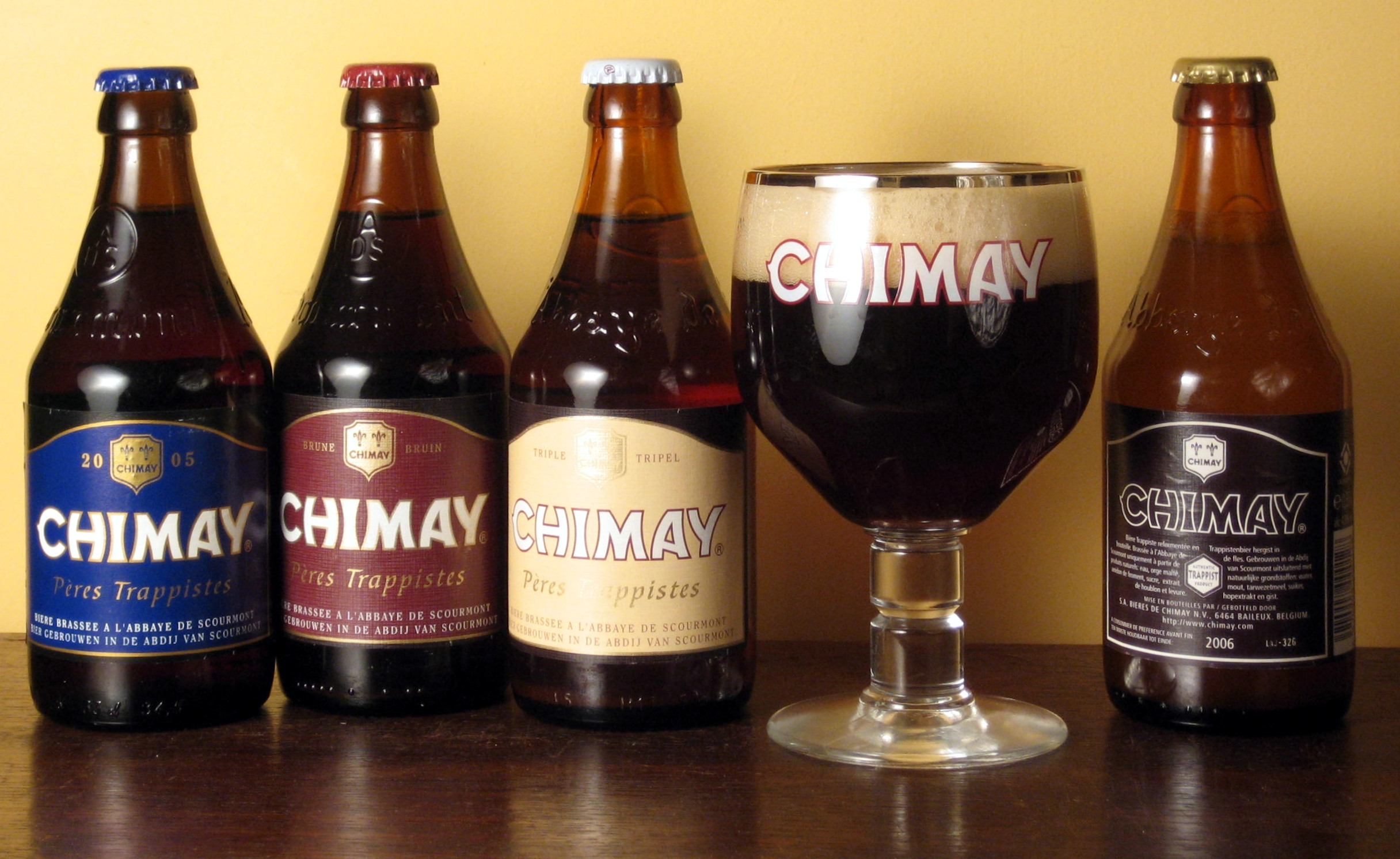
Chimay beers and glass

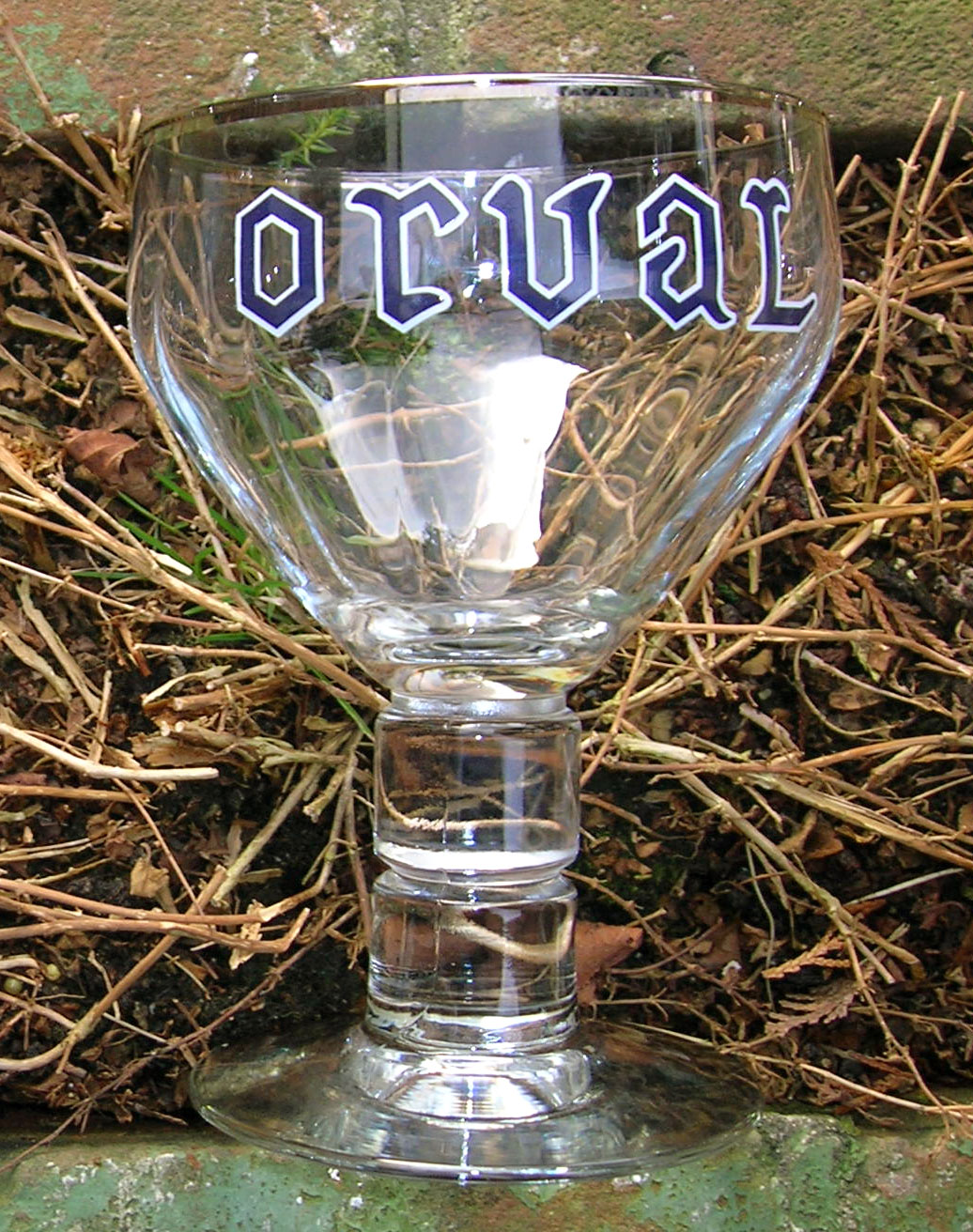
Orval beer's "chalice" glass

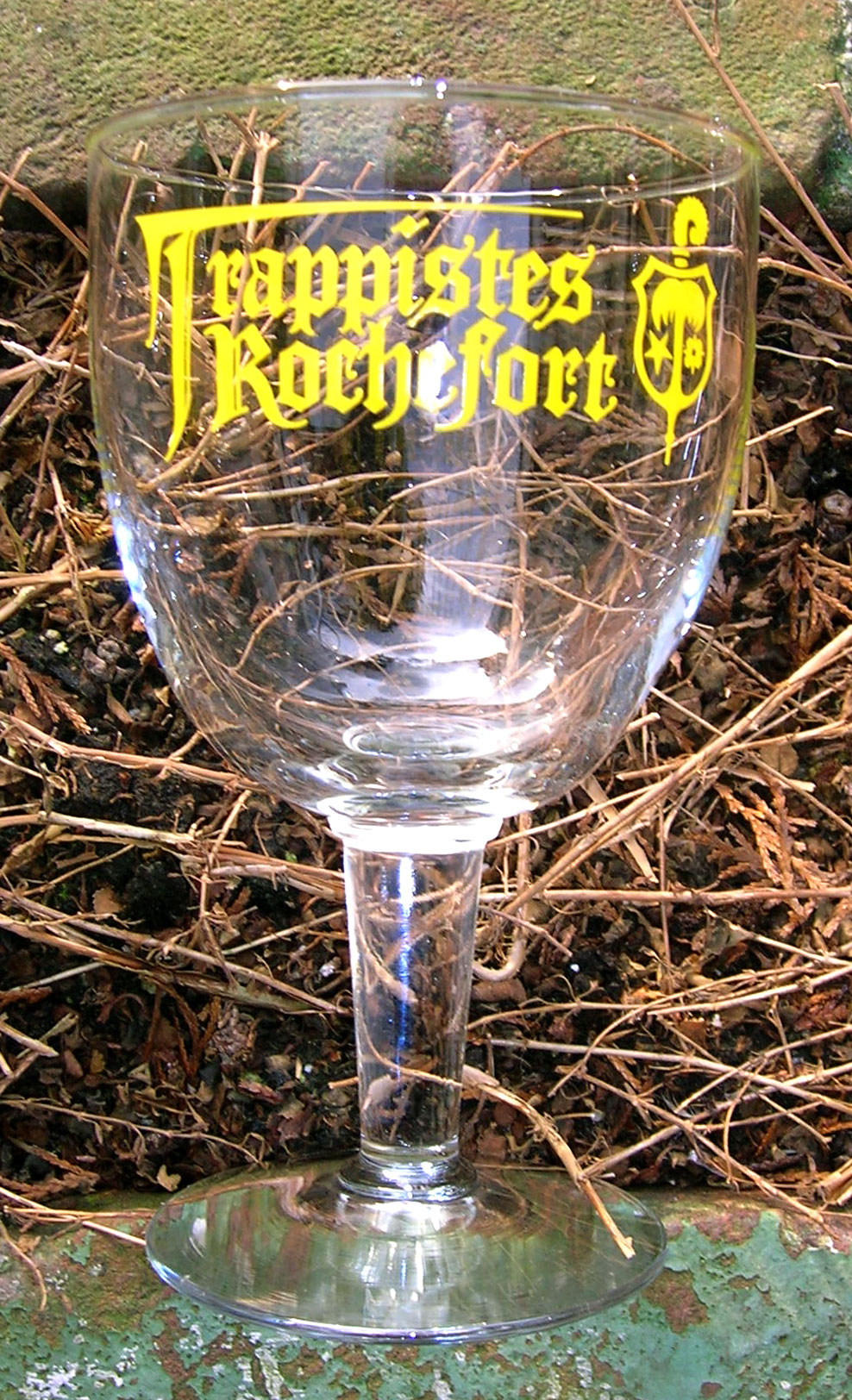
Rochefort beer's "goblet" glass

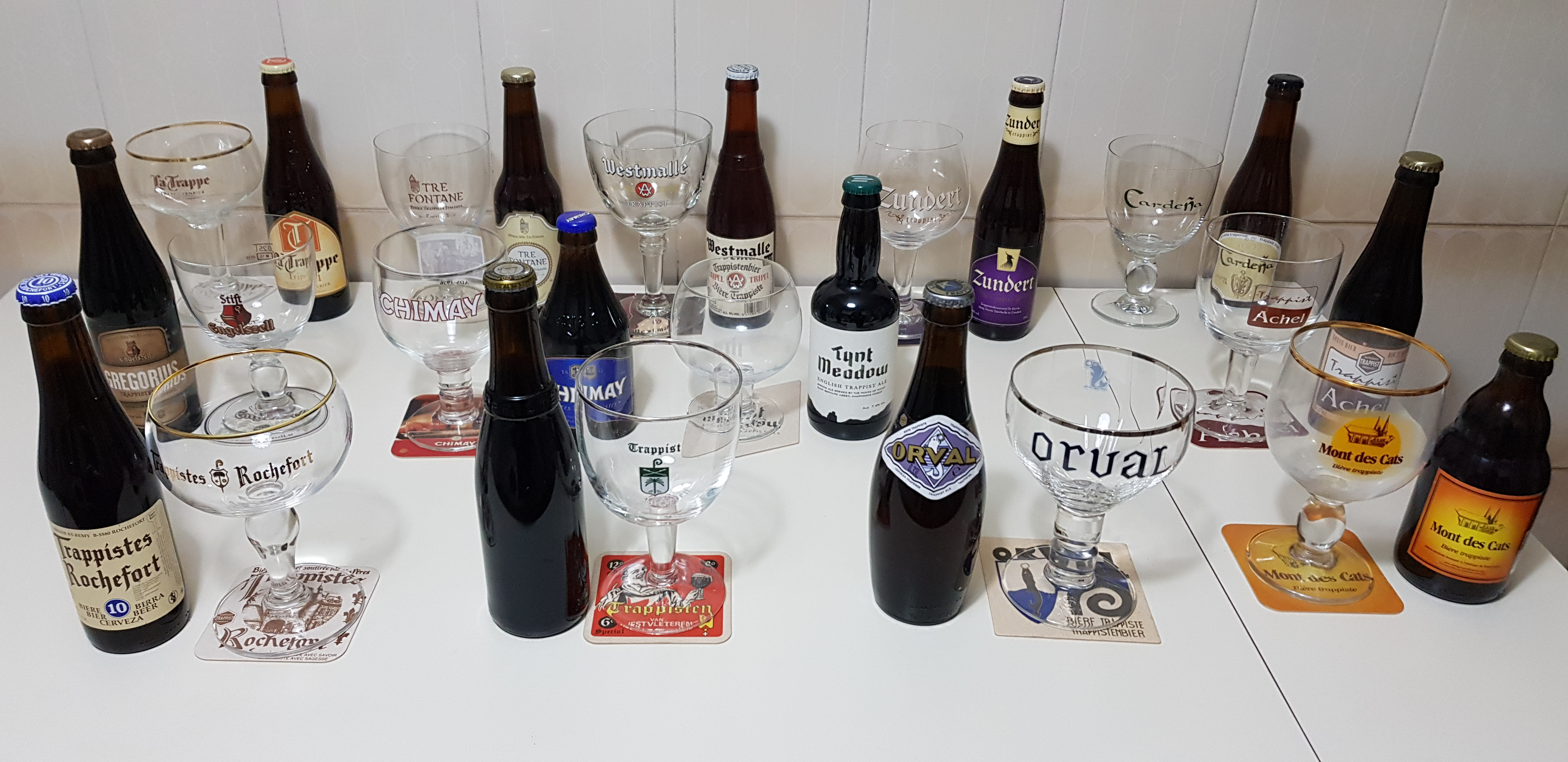
Thirteen Trappist beers and their glasses

== Tourism ==
The idea of visiting Trappist monasteries to sample their beers has become more popular from the late 1980s, booming in the 1990s, partly due to promotion by enthusiasts such as the 'beer hunter' Michael Jackson. Some brewing monasteries maintain a visitors' centre where their beers can be tasted and bought (sometimes with other monastic products such as bread and cheese). Visits to the monastery itself are usually not available to the general public, although visitors can overnight in some of the monasteries (like Achel) if their purpose is non-touristic. Currently, Koningshoeven (which brews La Trappe) in Netherlands offers regular tours around their bottling plant, old brewery and parts of their site, along with a beer tasting.

== See also ==
- Alcohol in Christianity
- Christian dietary laws
- Beer in Belgium
- Beer in the Netherlands
- Barrel-aged beer
