= Leende =

- Village
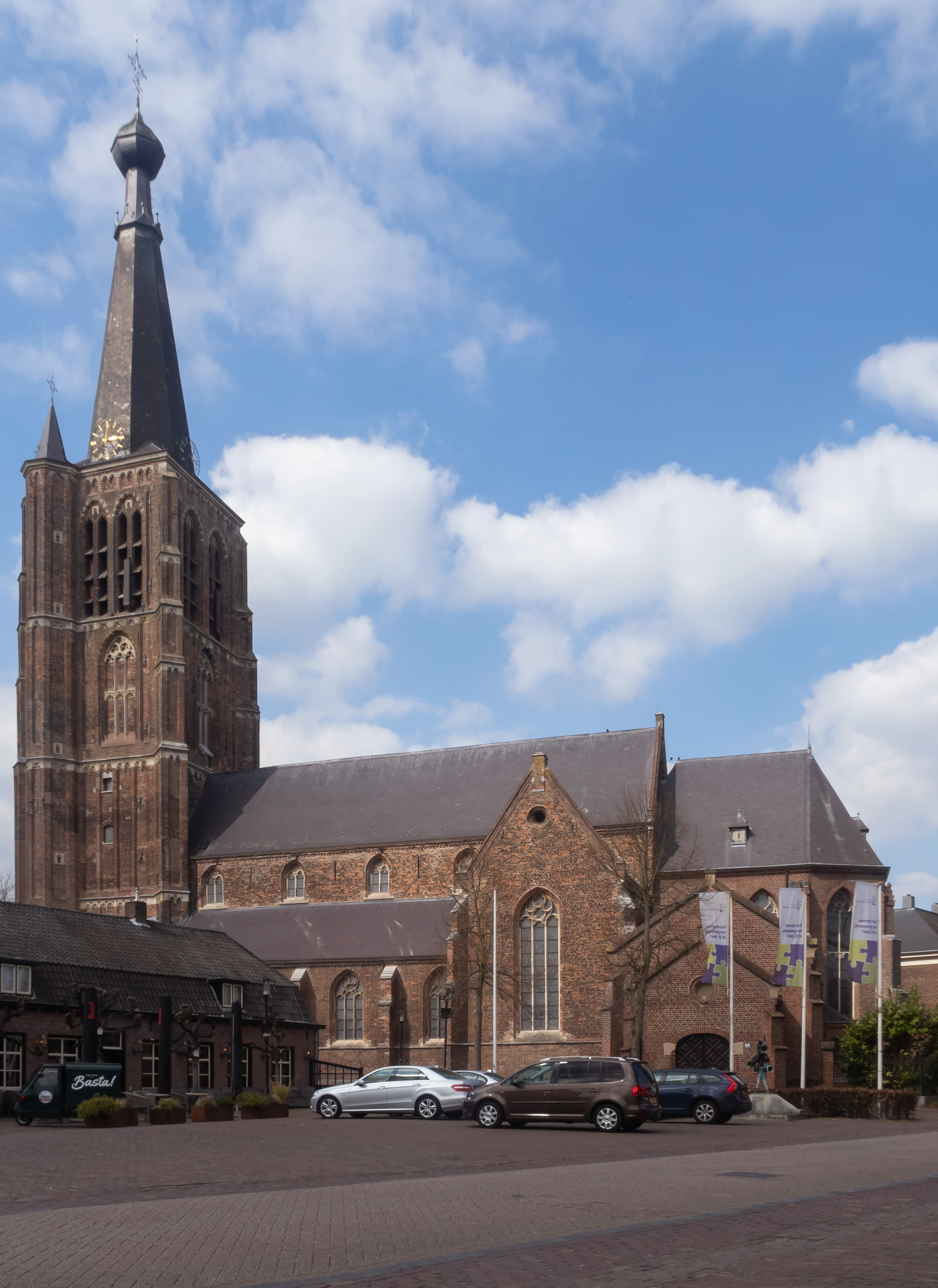
- St Petrus Banden Church

- Flag Coat of arms

- Location in the province of North Brabant in the Netherlands Leende (Netherlands)
- Coordinates: 51°20′59″N 5°33′9″E
- Country: Netherlands
- Province: North Brabant
- Municipality: Heeze-Leende

Area
  - Total: 35.30 km^{2} (13.63 sq mi)
- Elevation: 25 m (82 ft)

Population (2021)
  - Total: 4,015
  - Density: 113.7/km^{2} (294.6/sq mi)
- Time zone: UTC+1 (CET)
  - Summer (DST): UTC+2 (CEST)
- Postal code: 5595
- Dialing code: 040

Leende is a village in the Dutch province of North Brabant. It is located in the municipality of Heeze-Leende, approximately 12 km southeast of Eindhoven.

== History ==
The village was first mentioned in 1253 as Lieende. The etymology is unclear. Leende is a village which developed in the Early Middle Ages along the Groote Aa.

A church has been known to exist since 1285. The choir of St. Petrus' Banden Church dates from around 1400. The tower is from the late-15th century. The church was restored in stages during the early 20th century.

Leende was home to 1,607 people in 1840. Leende was a separate municipality until 1997, when it merged with Heeze.

== Local parts ==
Heeze, Leende, Leenderstrijp and Sterksel.

== Neighbouring communities ==
Geldrop-Mierlo, Someren, Cranendonck, Hamont-Achel, Valkenswaard, Waalre and Eindhoven.

== Gallery ==
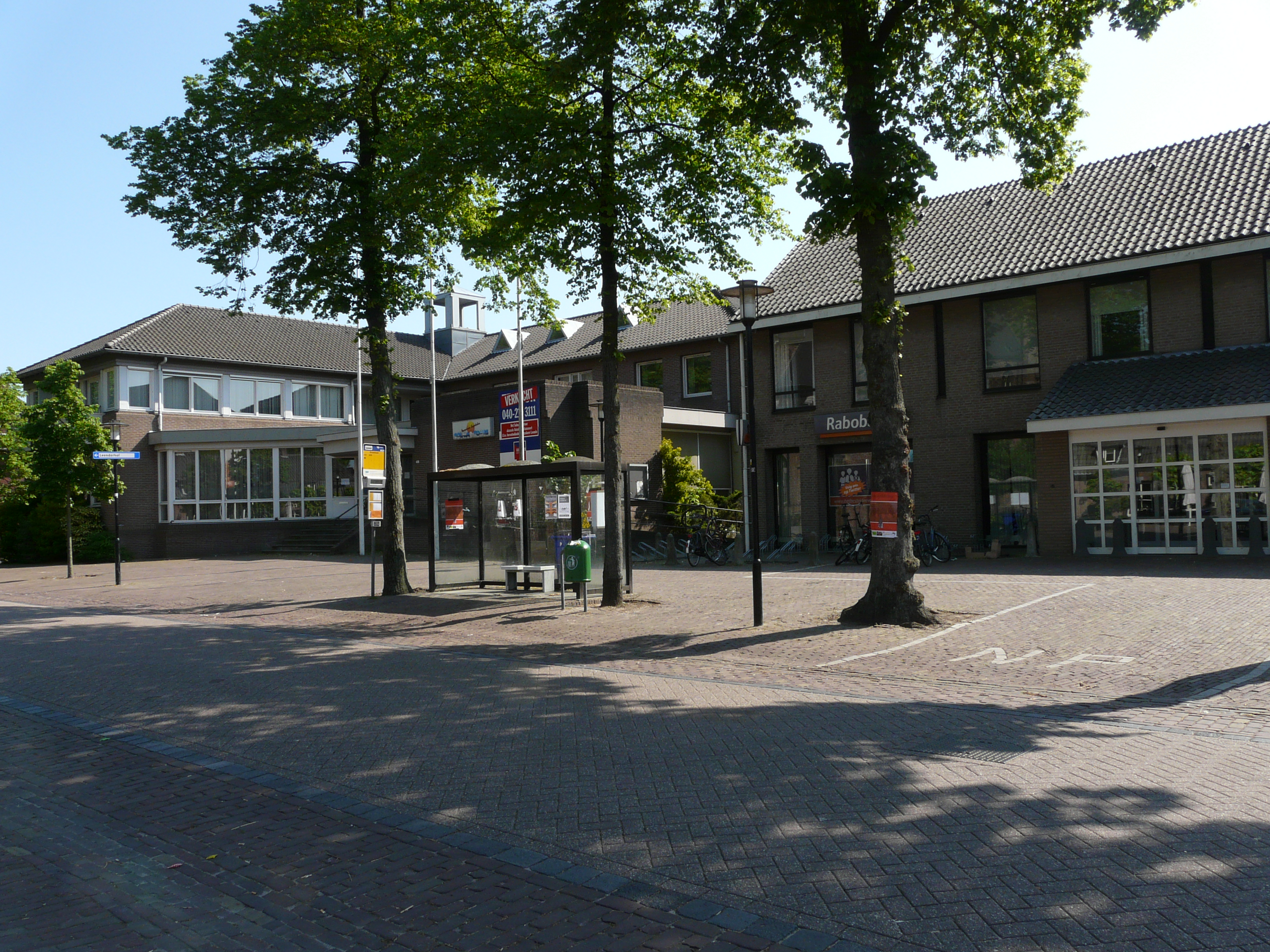
Central square

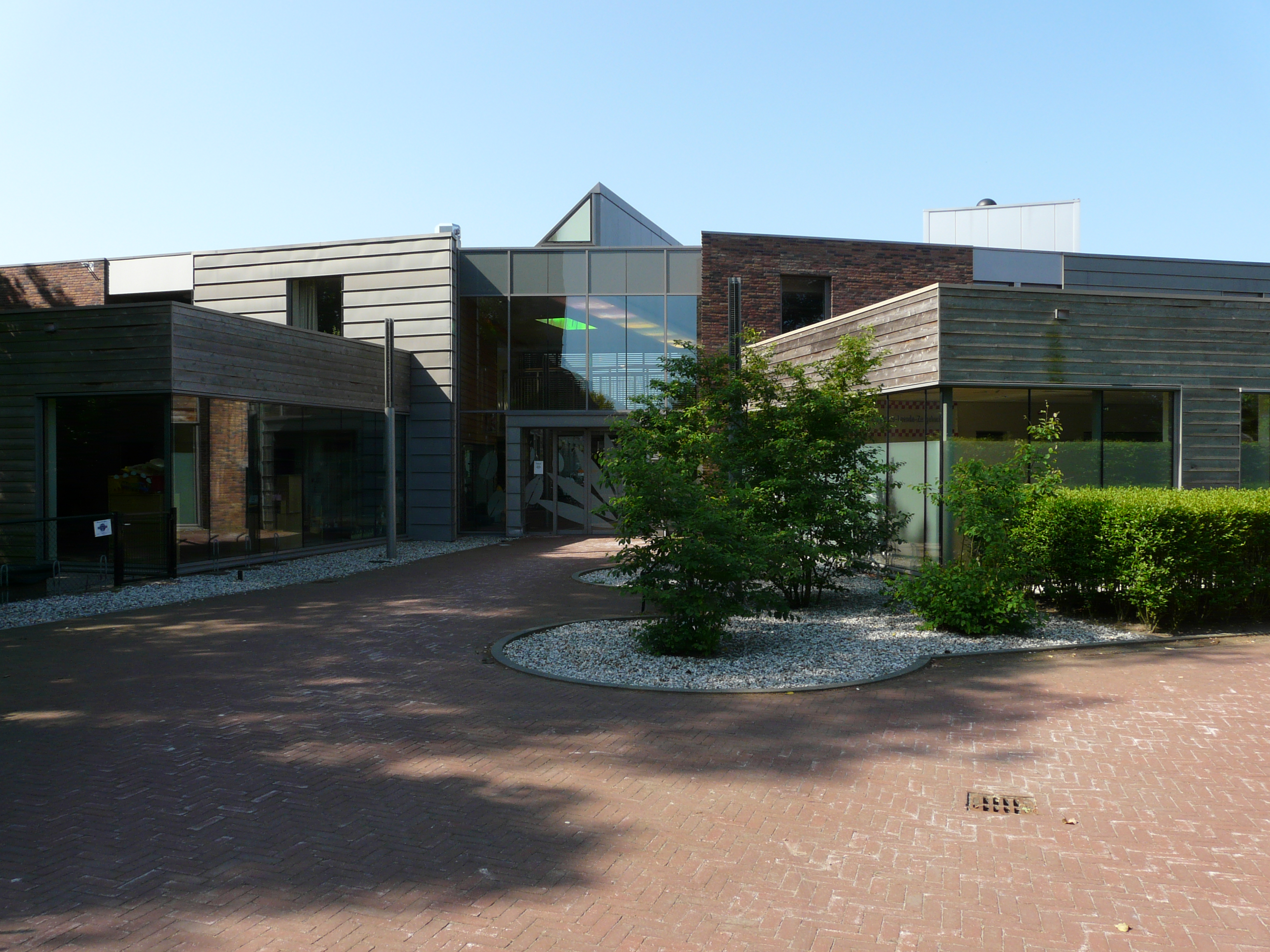
Leenderhof, retirement home

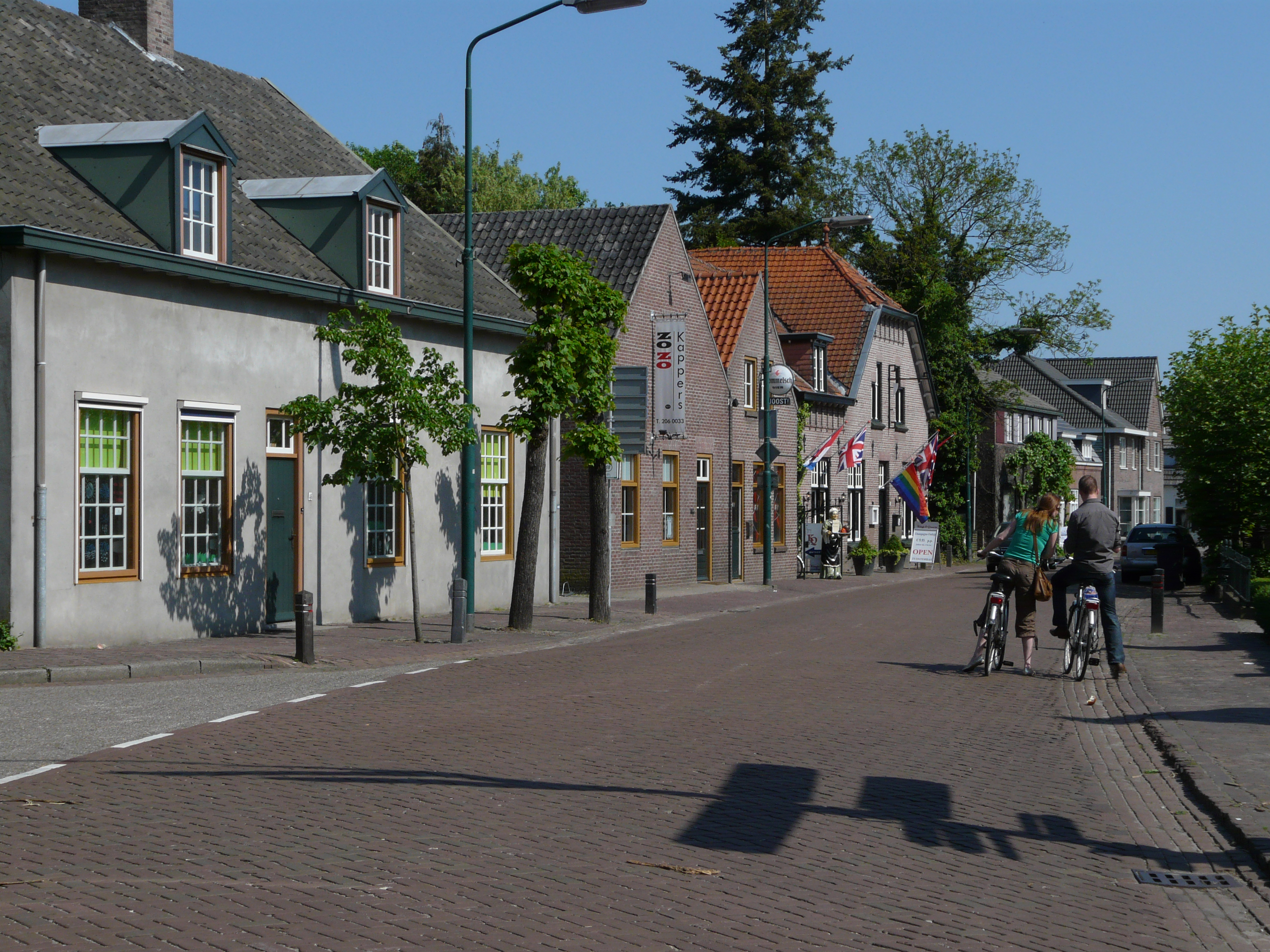
Dorpstraat

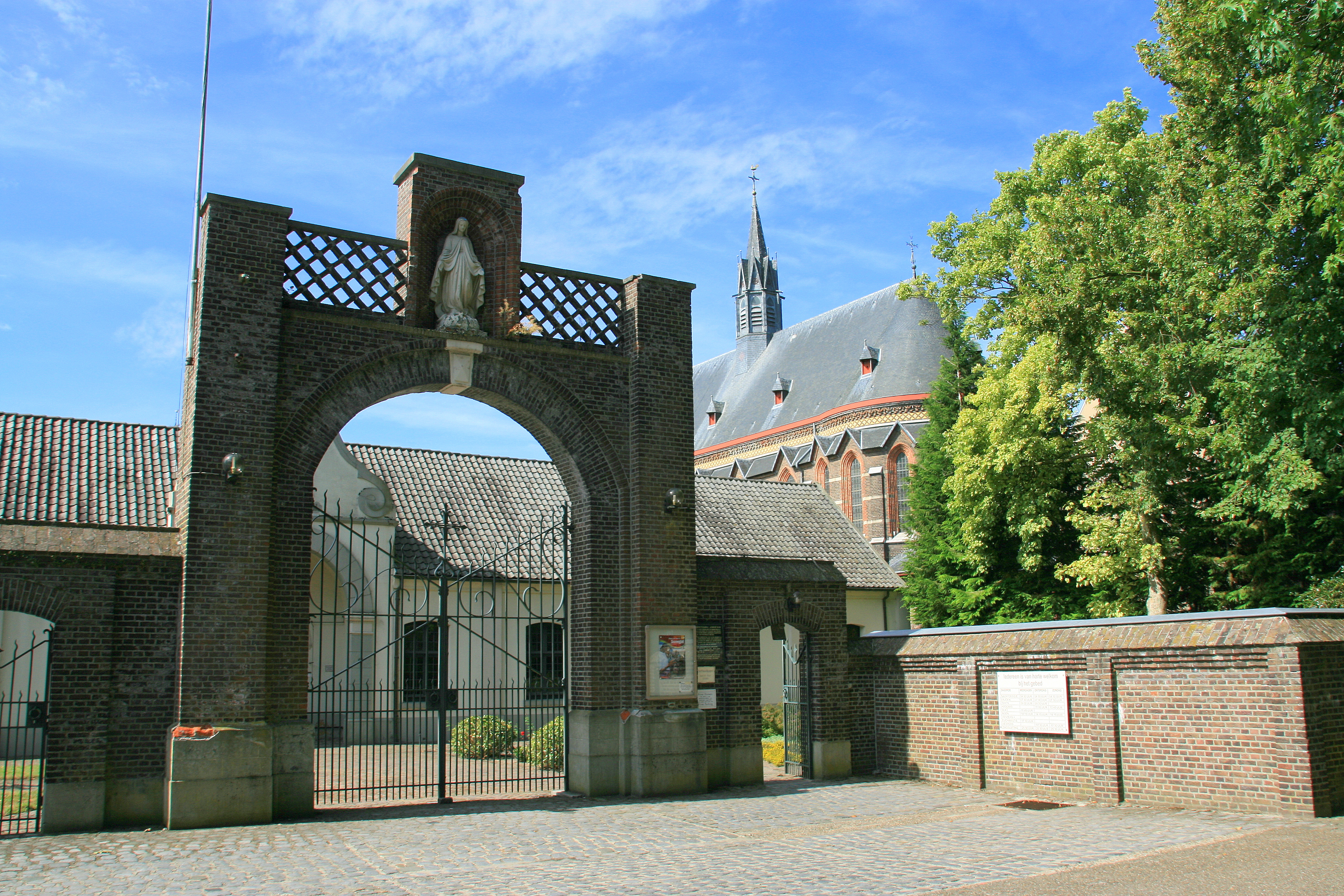
"Achelse Kluis", Monastery on the border with Belgium

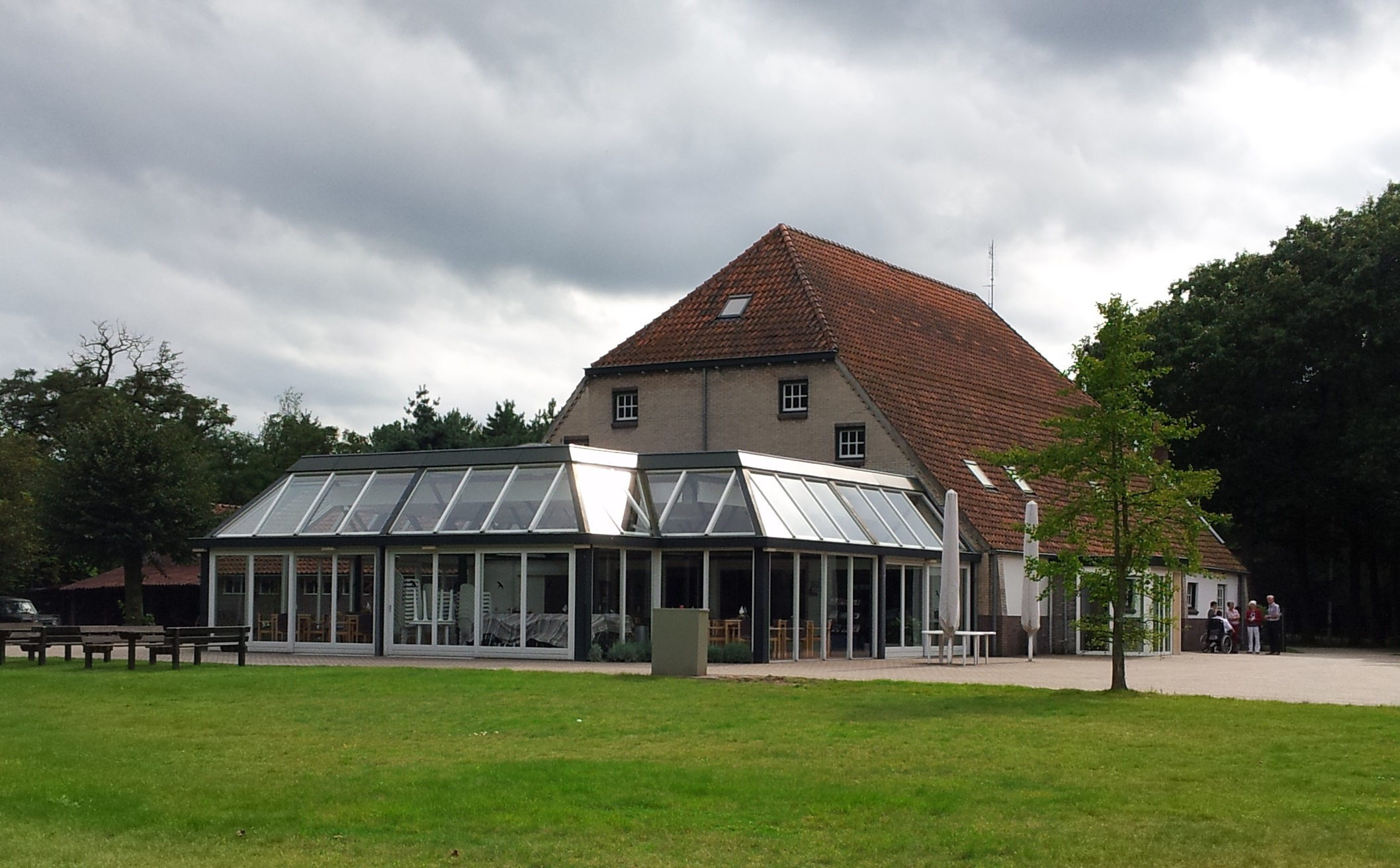
Restaurant Mariahoeve
