= Achel Abbey =

Coordinates: 51.298778°N 5.488572°E

Trappist Abbey of Achel
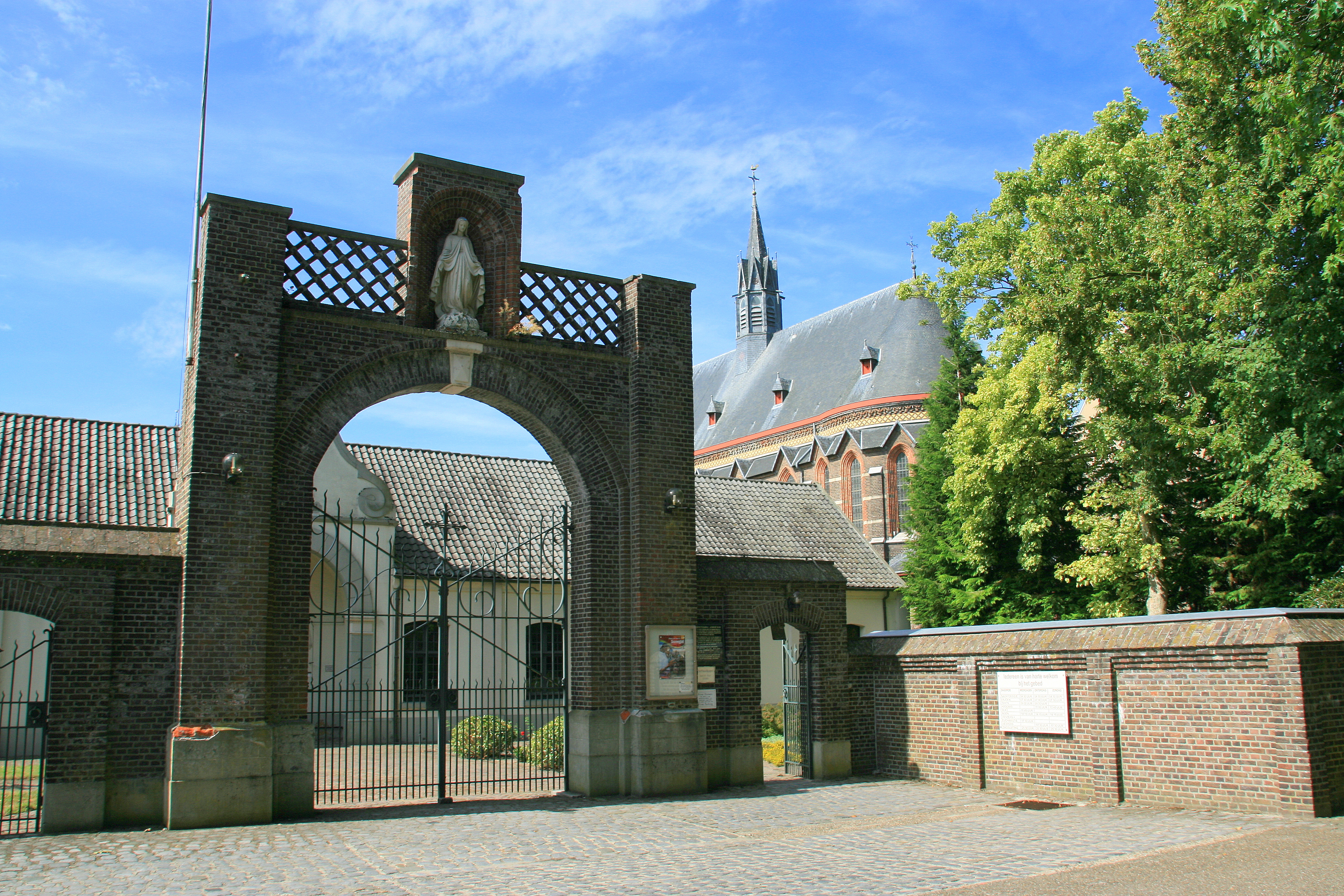
- Entrance of the Saint Benedictus-Abbey

Monastery information
- Order: Trappist
- Established: 1871
- Disestablished: 2021
- Dedicated to: Saint Benedict

Site
- Location: (Belgium) Hamont-Achel (Netherlands) Heeze-Leende
- Public access: No
- Other information: Produces and markets Achel Beers.

The Trappist Abbey of Achel or Saint Benedictus-Abbey or Achelse Kluis (which means hermitage of Achel), which belongs to the Cistercians of Strict Observance, is located in Achel in the Campine region of the province of Limburg (Flanders, Belgium). The abbey was famous for its spiritual life and its brewery, which was one of only a few Trappist beer breweries in the world. Life in the abbey was characterised by prayer, reading and manual work, the three basic elements of Trappist life. The monastic community came to an end in January 2021, with the last two monks moving to Westmalle Abbey.

== History ==
=== 17th to 18th century ===
On 30 January 1648, at the end of the Eighty Years War, the Treaty of Münster was signed between Spain and the Netherlands. The result of the treaty was that the Catholic mass was not allowed in the Dutch Republic. Therefore, Catholics from Valkenswaard and Schaft built a chapel in Achel which was part of the Prince-Bishopric of Liège. The early roots of the Abbey date back to 1686, when Petrus van Eynatten, a son of the mayor of Eindhoven, founded a community of hermits of Saint Joseph. The community would flourish until 1789 when they were expelled from their convent after the French revolutionary army invaded the Austrian Netherlands. The abbey was sold to Jan Diederik van Tuyll van Serooskerken (Utrecht, 6 August 1773 – Heeze, 9 July 1843).

=== 19th century ===
On 21 March 1846 the Trappists from Westmalle Abbey founded a priory in Achel (first founded in Meersel-Dreef on 3 May 1838 in a former monastery of the Order of Friars Minor Capuchin). The abbey and its 95 hectares of land had been bought by the priest Gast from Heeze on 9 April 1845 with the support of several beneficiaries. The first beer to be brewed on the site was the "Patersvaatje" in 1852. In 1871, the priory was granted the status of abbey and beer brewing became a regular activity. By reclaiming wasteland, the agriculture and cattle-breeding of the abbey prospered. In addition several daughter-houses were founded in Echt (Lilbosch Abbey), Diepenveen, Rochefort (Rochefort Abbey) and the abbey of Notre Dame de l'Emmanuel in Kasanza in 1958 (Belgian Congo)

=== 20th century ===
At the beginning of World War I (1914) the monks left the abbey. The Germans dismantled the brewery in 1917 to salvage approximately 700 kg of copper. After World War II a new abbey was built between 1946 and 1952, but only two wings of the planned four were completed. In 1989 the abbey sold most of its land to the Dutch National Forest Administration and the Flemish Government. In 1998 with the support from the trappists from Westmalle and Rochefort brewing started again.

== Monks ==
- Dom Franciscus Janssens, Ocist. 76th General Abbot of the Common Observance.

== Sources ==
- J. Van Remoortere, Ippa's Abdijengids voor Belgie, Lanno, 1990
