= List of protected heritage sites in Hamont-Achel =

This table shows an overview of the immovable heritage sites in the Flemish dialect town Hamont-Achel. This list is part of Belgium's national heritage.

Object	Status^{?}	Year/architect	Town/section	Address	Coordinates	Number^{?}	Image
Wooden cross with cast iron figure of Christ ^{(nl)} ^{(fr)}			Hamont-Achel	Achelpoort	51.25108°N 5.54250°E	79993 Info	
House ^{(nl)}			Hamont-Achel	Kapelstraat 4	51.25220°N 5.54066°E	79994 Info	
House ^{(nl)}			Hamont-Achel	Achelpoort 12	51.25180°N 5.54230°E	79995 Info	
The Boerke (Bocholt) ^{(nl)} ^{(fr)}			Hamont-Achel	Kapelstraat 2	51.25229°N 5.54079°E	79996 Info	
elongated farm ^{(nl)} ^{(fr)}			Hamont-Achel	Achterhoek 9	51.24379°N 5.52634°E	79997 Info	
elongated farm ^{(nl)} ^{(fr)}			Hamont-Achel	Beverbeek 12	51.26516°N 5.52621°E	79998 Info	
Castle Beverbeek ^{(nl)} ^{(fr)}			Hamont-Achel	Beverbeek 19	51.27651°N 5.51544°E	79999 Info	
Chapel of the Black Sisters ^{(nl)} ^{(fr)}			Hamont-Achel	Bosstraat 7	51.24938°N 5.54057°E	80001 Info	
Single building ordinance: workhouse-house ^{(nl)} ^{(fr)}			Hamont-Achel	Bosstraat 48	51.24910°N 5.53657°E	80002 Info	
Detached house, double house ^{(nl)} ^{(fr)}			Hamont-Achel	Bosstraat 73	51.24760°N 5.53290°E	80004 Info	
Single elongated farm ^{(nl)} ^{(fr)}			Hamont-Achel	Bosstraat 105	51.24750°N 5.52870°E	80005 Info	
store ^{(nl)} ^{(fr)}			Hamont-Achel	Brouwersstraat 1	51.25155°N 5.54510°E	80006 Info	
store ^{(nl)} ^{(fr)}			Hamont-Achel	Brouwersstraat 3	51.25155°N 5.54510°E	80006 Info	
store ^{(nl)} ^{(fr)}			Hamont-Achel	Brouwersstraat 5	51.25155°N 5.54510°E	80006 Info	
store ^{(nl)} ^{(fr)}			Hamont-Achel	Brouwersstraat 7	51.25155°N 5.54510°E	80006 Info	
Wooden cross with witbeschilderde cast iron figure of Christ ^{(nl)} ^{(fr)}			Hamont-Achel	Budelpoort	51.25196°N 5.54734°E	80007 Info	
House, double house ^{(nl)} ^{(fr)}			Hamont-Achel	Budelpoort 34	51.25269°N 5.55013°E	80008 Info	
Tollhouse (former) ^{(nl)} ^{(fr)}			Hamont-Achel	Budelpoort 44	51.25281°N 5.55095°E	80009 Info	
Formerly "Bierkasteel", now "Erkenhof" ^{(nl)} ^{(fr)}			Hamont-Achel	Budelpoort 47	51.25390°N 5.55127°E	80010 Info	
Salvator's College (former), "Wico Campus Salvator" ^{(nl)} ^{(fr)}			Hamont-Achel	Collegestraat 25	51.23202°N 5.54118°E	80011 Info	
Two linked houses ^{(nl)} ^{(fr)}			Hamont-Achel	Groenstraat 47	51.24722°N 5.54901°E	80012 Info	
Two linked houses ^{(nl)} ^{(fr)}			Hamont-Achel	Groenstraat 49	51.24722°N 5.54901°E	80012 Info	
Single elongated farm ^{(nl)} ^{(fr)}			Hamont-Achel	Grote Haart 22	51.25432°N 5.52153°E	80013 Info	
Boskapel Our Lady of Perpetual-Assistance- ^{(nl)} ^{(fr)}			Hamont-Achel	Hees	51.24149°N 5.51525°E	80014 Info	
Double House ^{(nl)}			Hamont-Achel	Hoogstraat 7	51.25131°N 5.54357°E	80016 Info	
Double House ^{(nl)}			Hamont-Achel	Hoogstraat 9	51.25131°N 5.54357°E	80016 Info	
Former kapelanie, now a private residence ^{(nl)} ^{(fr)}			Hamont-Achel	Hoogstraat 33	51.25224°N 5.54482°E	80017 Info	
elongated farm ^{(nl)} ^{(fr)}			Hamont-Achel	Kapelstraat 88	51.25344°N 5.52890°E	80018 Info	
presbytery St. Lawrence Church ^{(nl)} ^{(fr)}	Yes		Hamont-Achel	Kerkstraat 1	51.25173°N 5.54636°E	80019 Info	
Town Pump ^{(nl)} ^{(fr)}			Hamont-Achel	Kerkstraat	51.25175°N 5.54713°E	80020 Info	
Former border cafe "The Running Tap" ^{(nl)} ^{(fr)}			Hamont-Achel	Keunenlaan 4	51.25348°N 5.55172°E	80021 Info	
Detached farmhouse with separate components ^{(nl)} ^{(fr)}			Hamont-Achel	Kleine Haart 30	51.25724°N 5.51977°E	80022 Info	
Remnants of the Ursuline Convent "Stalleken van Bethlehem" ^{(nl)} ^{(fr)}	Yes		Hamont-Achel	Kloosterstraat 2	51.25073°N 5.54771°E	80023 Info	
Chapel of the Ursulines convent ^{(nl)} ^{(fr)}	Yes		Hamont-Achel	Kloosterstraat	51.25108°N 5.54841°E	80024 Info	
Subsidized Free Primary School, since 1993, "De Buitinge" ^{(nl)} ^{(fr)}			Hamont-Achel	Kloosterstraat 2	51.25071°N 5.54767°E	80025 Info	
Nursery school ^{(nl)} ^{(fr)}			Hamont-Achel	Kloosterstraat	51.25073°N 5.54698°E	80026 Info	
School for girls ^{(nl)} ^{(fr)}			Hamont-Achel	Kloosterstraat	51.25025°N 5.54653°E	80027 Info	
Single elongated farm ^{(nl)}			Hamont-Achel	Krekelhoeve 3	51.24883°N 5.51899°E	80028 Info	
Single elongated farm ^{(nl)} ^{(fr)}			Hamont-Achel	Krekelhoeve 7	51.24946°N 5.51997°E	80029 Info	
Salvator Mundi Parish ^{(nl)} ^{(fr)}			Hamont-Achel	't Lo	51.23347°N 5.53946°E	80030 Info	
Subsidized Free Primary Hamont-Lo ^{(nl)} ^{(fr)}			Hamont-Achel	't Lo 13	51.23417°N 5.54159°E	80031 Info	
Single double house ^{(nl)} ^{(fr)}			Hamont-Achel	't Lo 46	51.23226°N 5.53900°E	80032 Info	
elongated farm ^{(nl)} ^{(fr)}			Hamont-Achel	Lozenweg 10	51.24176°N 5.54824°E	80033 Info	
The Castle of Lo de l'Escaille ^{(nl)} ^{(fr)}	Yes		Hamont-Achel	Lozenweg 100	51.22561°N 5.54640°E	80034 Info	
The Castle of Lo de l'Escaille ^{(nl)} ^{(fr)}	Yes		Hamont-Achel	Lozenweg 102	51.22561°N 5.54640°E	80034 Info	
The Castle of Lo or "de l'Escaille" ^{(nl)} ^{(fr)}	Yes		Hamont-Achel	Lozenweg 104	51.22561°N 5.54640°E	80034 Info	
Napoleon's Mill ^{(nl)} ^{(fr)}	Yes		Hamont-Achel	Dr. Mathijsenstraat 3	51.25087°N 5.53973°E	80035 Info	
elongated farm ^{(nl)} ^{(fr)}			Hamont-Achel	Mulk 63	51.26358°N 5.55075°E	80036 Info	
elongated farm ^{(nl)} ^{(fr)}			Hamont-Achel	Mulk 116	51.26336°N 5.54022°E	80037 Info	
elongated farm ^{(nl)} ^{(fr)}			Hamont-Achel	Mulk 120	51.26321°N 5.53827°E	80038 Info	
Pump platform of stone ^{(nl)} ^{(fr)}			Hamont-Achel	Stad	51.25123°N 5.54544°E	80039 Info	
House Geusens ^{(nl)}	Yes		Hamont-Achel	Stad 4	51.25048°N 5.54337°E	80040 Info	
House Spaas ^{(nl)}	Yes		Hamont-Achel	Stad 21	51.25141°N 5.54446°E	80042 Info	
House Gijbels ^{(nl)}	Yes		Hamont-Achel	Stad 27	51.25148°N 5.54472°E	80043 Info	
Hegge House ^{(nl)}			Hamont-Achel	Stad 32	51.25076°N 5.54483°E	80044 Info	
De Pool House or "Rijcken" ^{(nl)}	Yes		Hamont-Achel	Stad 37	51.25157°N 5.54565°E	80045 Info	
House Cuppens ^{(nl)}	Yes		Hamont-Achel	Stad 39	51.25155°N 5.54583°E	80046 Info	
"Huis Van Engelen" ^{(nl)}	Yes		Hamont-Achel	Stad 44	51.25092°N 5.54622°E	80047 Info	
House"De Gulden Poort" ^{(nl)}	Yes		Hamont-Achel	Stadswaag 8	51.25042°N 5.54241°E	80048 Info	
House ^{(nl)}			Hamont-Achel	Stadswaag 20	51.24990°N 5.54291°E	80049 Info	
former hotel and restaurant "Neuf" ^{(nl)}			Hamont-Achel	Stationsplein 4	51.24679°N 5.54479°E	80051 Info	
House ^{(nl)}			Hamont-Achel	Stationsstraat 12	51.24835°N 5.54376°E	80052 Info	
House, double house ^{(nl)} ^{(fr)}			Hamont-Achel	Stationsstraat 18	51.24809°N 5.54375°E	80053 Info	
"Teutenwoning Henri Rijcken" ^{(nl)}			Hamont-Achel	Stationsstraat 28	51.24757°N 5.54398°E	80054 Info	
Saint Therese Chapel Mulk ^{(nl)} ^{(fr)}			Hamont-Achel	Toomstraat	51.26479°N 5.54948°E	80055 Info	
Cast iron boundary ^{(nl)} ^{(fr)}			Hamont-Achel	Toomstraat	51.26683°N 5.55541°E	80056 Info	
Column-shaped water tower of 1957 ^{(nl)} ^{(fr)}			Hamont-Achel	Watertorenstraat	51.24568°N 5.52710°E	80058 Info	
Sacred Heart Chapel of the district Achterhoek ^{(nl)} ^{(fr)}			Hamont-Achel	Windmolenstraat	51.24218°N 5.53503°E	80059 Info	
Single, elongated farm ^{(nl)} ^{(fr)}			Hamont-Achel	Winter 9	51.23509°N 5.52381°E	80060 Info	
Detached village house ^{(nl)} ^{(fr)}			Hamont-Achel	Achel Statie 7	51.26795°N 5.47447°E	80061 Info	
Former customs house "De Acht Zaligheden" ^{(nl)} ^{(fr)}			Hamont-Achel	Achel Statie 11	51.26837°N 5.47393°E	80062 Info	
Former customs house "De Acht Zaligheden" ^{(nl)} ^{(fr)}			Hamont-Achel	Achel Statie 13	51.26837°N 5.47393°E	80062 Info	
Former customs house "De Acht Zaligheden" ^{(nl)} ^{(fr)}			Hamont-Achel	Achel Statie 15	51.26837°N 5.47393°E	80062 Info	
Former customs house "De Acht Zaligheden" ^{(nl)} ^{(fr)}			Hamont-Achel	Achel Statie 17	51.26837°N 5.47393°E	80062 Info	
Former customs house "De Acht Zaligheden" ^{(nl)} ^{(fr)}			Hamont-Achel	Achel Statie 19	51.26837°N 5.47393°E	80062 Info	
Former customs house "De Acht Zaligheden" ^{(nl)} ^{(fr)}			Hamont-Achel	Achel Statie 21	51.26837°N 5.47393°E	80062 Info	
Former customs house "De Acht Zaligheden" ^{(nl)} ^{(fr)}			Hamont-Achel	Achel Statie 23	51.26837°N 5.47393°E	80062 Info	
Former customs house "De Acht Zaligheden" ^{(nl)} ^{(fr)}			Hamont-Achel	Achel Statie 25	51.26837°N 5.47393°E	80062 Info	
Detached town house "Les Agnelets" ^{(nl)} ^{(fr)}			Hamont-Achel	Achel Statie 35	51.26916°N 5.47357°E	80063 Info	
Single residential house ^{(nl)} ^{(fr)}			Hamont-Achel	Achel Statie 50	51.27259°N 5.47048°E	80064 Info	
Single residential house ^{(nl)} ^{(fr)}			Hamont-Achel	Achel Statie 78	51.27445°N 5.46987°E	80065 Info	
Detached former farmhouse elongated ^{(nl)} ^{(fr)}			Hamont-Achel	Bergeind 2	51.24958°N 5.48113°E	80067 Info	
Wijkschool of Achel Station ^{(nl)} ^{(fr)}			Hamont-Achel	Berkenstraat 2	51.27265°N 5.47286°E	80068 Info	
"Beverbeekhoeve" or "Grote Hoeve" ^{(nl)}	Yes		Hamont-Achel	Beverbeek 21	51.27864°N 5.51299°E	80069 Info	
Former forester's house of the castle Genes Pants ^{(nl)} ^{(fr)}			Hamont-Achel	Catharinadal	51.25374°N 5.48493°E	80070 Info	
Former forester's house of the castle Genes Pants ^{(nl)} ^{(fr)}			Hamont-Achel	Catharinadal 1	51.25374°N 5.48493°E	80070 Info	
remnants of "Catharinadal" ^{(nl)}			Hamont-Achel	Catharinadal	51.25356°N 5.48541°E	80071 Info	
Castle Genes Pants ^{(nl)} ^{(fr)}			Hamont-Achel	Catharinadal 3	51.25294°N 5.48746°E	80072 Info	
Former Franciscan Monastery Catharinadal ^{(nl)} ^{(fr)}			Hamont-Achel	Catharinadal 5	51.25332°N 5.48489°E	80073 Info	
Open schob ^{(nl)} ^{(fr)}			Hamont-Achel	Catharinadal 9	51.25211°N 5.48491°E	80074 Info	
Achelse Safe ^{(nl)} ^{(fr)}	Yes		Hamont-Achel	De Kluis 1	51.29890°N 5.48782°E	80075 Info	
House Croymans ^{(nl)}			Hamont-Achel	Dorpsstraat 7	51.25286°N 5.47992°E	80076 Info	
House Croymans ^{(nl)}			Hamont-Achel	Dorpsstraat 9	51.25286°N 5.47992°E	80076 Info	
Single house ^{(nl)} ^{(fr)}			Hamont-Achel	Dorpsstraat 34	51.25329°N 5.47920°E	80077 Info	
former home of Pieter Jan Brouwer ^{(nl)} ^{(fr)}			Hamont-Achel	Dorpsstraat 46	51.25264°N 5.47871°E	80078 Info	
former home of Master Sak ^{(nl)} ^{(fr)}			Hamont-Achel	Dorpsstraat 62	51.25206°N 5.47888°E	80080 Info	
War Memorial of W.O. I. ^{(nl)} ^{(fr)}	Yes		Hamont-Achel	Generaal Dempseylaan	51.25562°N 5.47898°E	80082 Info	
Simonshuis ^{(nl)}	Yes		Hamont-Achel	Generaal Dempseylaan 1	51.25553°N 5.47784°E	80083 Info	
Eight artificially elevated mounds from the Iron Age ^{(nl)} ^{(fr)}			Hamont-Achel	Grote Haart	51.26507°N 5.52079°E	80084 Info	
Chapel of Our Lady of Peace ^{(nl)} ^{(fr)}			Hamont-Achel	Klein Bien	51.24442°N 5.46946°E	80086 Info	
De Tomp ^{(nl)}	Yes		Hamont-Achel	Koebroekerweg	51.26685°N 5.49722°E	80087 Info	
Parish and St. Monulphus Gondulph ^{(nl)} ^{(fr)}	Yes		Hamont-Achel	Michielsplein	51.25468°N 5.47914°E	80089 Info	
kiosk ^{(nl)} ^{(fr)}			Hamont-Achel	Michielsplein	51.25419°N 5.47903°E	80090 Info	
Cast iron village pump ^{(nl)} ^{(fr)}			Hamont-Achel	Michielsplein	51.25301°N 5.47982°E	80091 Info	
'T Mulke ^{(nl)}			Hamont-Achel	Molendijk 45	51.27259°N 5.49865°E	80092 Info	
Chapel of Our Lady in Distress ^{(nl)} ^{(fr)}			Hamont-Achel	Orchideeënlaan	51.25331°N 5.49545°E	80093 Info	
St. Joseph Chapel ^{(nl)} ^{(fr)}			Hamont-Achel	Orchideeënlaan	51.25395°N 5.48545°E	80094 Info	
Natural stone border marker ^{(nl)}			Hamont-Achel	Orchideeënlaan	51.25377°N 5.49699°E	80095 Info	
elongated farm "Melskens" ^{(nl)}			Hamont-Achel	Oude Baan 30	51.26130°N 5.47833°E	80097 Info	
Barn near a modern house ^{(nl)}			Hamont-Achel	Oude Pastorijstraat 32	51.25754°N 5.47229°E	80098 Info	
electrical energy cabin ^{(nl)} ^{(fr)}	Yes		Hamont-Achel	Pastoor Bungenerslaan	51.25619°N 5.47923°E	80099 Info	
erstwhile presbytery ^{(nl)} ^{(fr)}	Yes		Hamont-Achel	Pastoor Bungenerslaan 2	51.25517°N 5.47961°E	80100 Info	
Former girls' school and convent of the Sisters Jozefienen ^{(nl)} ^{(fr)}	Yes		Hamont-Achel	Pastoor Bungenerslaan 14	51.25625°N 5.47961°E	80101 Info	
elongated farm ^{(nl)} ^{(fr)}			Hamont-Achel	Rodenrijt	51.26933°N 5.46932°E	80102 Info	
"Huis Van Waesberghe" ^{(nl)}			Hamont-Achel	Schutterijstraat 3	51.25411°N 5.47810°E	80103 Info	
"Finding of Holy Cross" Parish ^{(nl)} ^{(fr)}			Hamont-Achel	Sint Odilialaan	51.27468°N 5.47465°E	80104 Info	
Painted iron boundary marker ^{(nl)} ^{(fr)}			Hamont-Achel	Sint Odilialaan	51.28818°N 5.47013°E	80105 Info	
Old house Ceelen ^{(nl)} ^{(fr)}			Hamont-Achel	Thomas Watsonlaan 4	51.25092°N 5.47931°E	80106 Info	
Old house Ceelen ^{(nl)} ^{(fr)}			Hamont-Achel	Thomas Watsonlaan 6	51.25092°N 5.47931°E	80106 Info	
Single residential house ^{(nl)} ^{(fr)}			Hamont-Achel	Thomas Watsonlaan 32	51.24927°N 5.47994°E	80107 Info	
Former weigh house ^{(nl)}			Hamont-Achel	Wagerdijk	51.26662°N 5.50615°E	80108 Info	
Single elongated farm ^{(nl)} ^{(fr)}			Hamont-Achel	Witteberg 14	51.25980°N 5.46659°E	80109 Info	
elongated farm ^{(nl)} ^{(fr)}			Hamont-Achel	Eind 68	51.26681°N 5.47653°E	80110 Info	
Single residential house ^{(nl)} ^{(fr)}	Yes		Hamont-Achel	Generaal Dempseylaan 10	51.25677°N 5.47889°E	80111 Info	

== See also ==
- List of onroerend erfgoed in Limburg (Belgium)
- Hamont-Achel
