= Heeze =

- Town
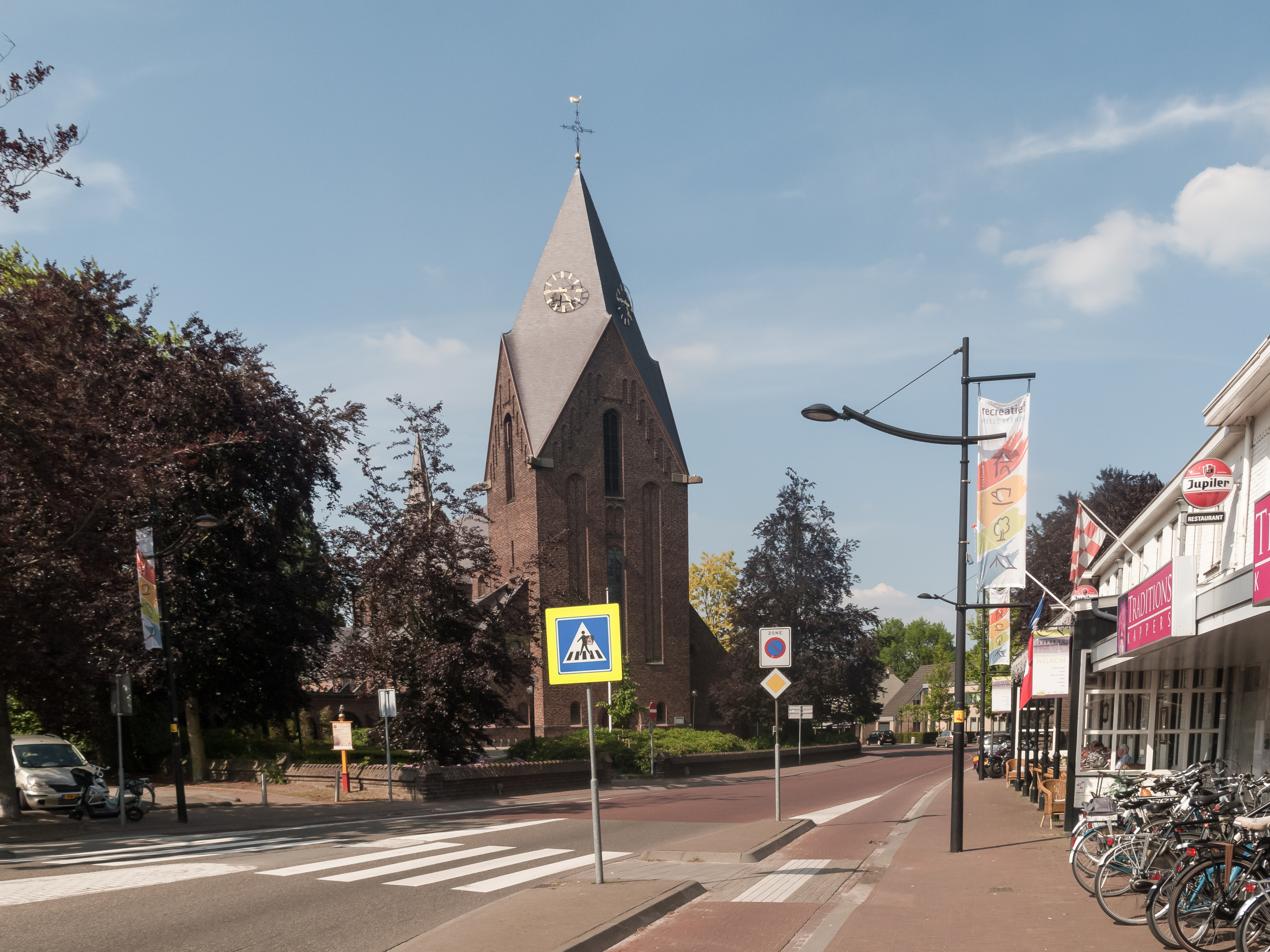
- The Saint Martinus Church

- Location in the province of North Brabant in the Netherlands Heeze (Netherlands)
- Coordinates: 51°22′57″N 5°34′6″E
- Country: Netherlands
- Province: North Brabant
- Municipality: Heeze-Leende

Area
  - Total: 45.96 km^{2} (17.75 sq mi)
- Elevation: 24 m (79 ft)

Population (2021)
  - Total: 9,945
  - Density: 216.4/km^{2} (560.4/sq mi)
- Time zone: UTC+1 (CET)
  - Summer (DST): UTC+2 (CEST)
- Postal code: 5591
- Dialing code: 040

Heeze is a town in the Dutch province of North Brabant. It is located in the municipality of Heeze-Leende, about 9 km southeast of Eindhoven.

The Heeze Castle is located east of the town. Further east and to the north lies the Strabrechtse Heide.

== History ==
The village was first mentioned in 1173 as Herebertus de Hese, and means shrubbery. Heeze is an agricultural community which developed along the Grootte Aa and Sterkselse Aa.

The heerlijkheid Heeze was first mentioned in 1172. A castle has been known since 1203. The current castle dates from the 15th century and enlarged and probably rebuilt in the 17th century. Between 1796 and 1798, a large English landscape garden was laid out around castle.

Heeze was home to 1,814 people in 1840. In 1913, a railway station was constructed on the Eindhoven to Weert railway line. It was closed in 1977, and a new railway station opened on a new location.

Heeze was a separate municipality until 1997, when it merged with Leende.

== Transportation ==
=== Road ===
Heeze is located close to the A2 and A67 motorways. Local roads connect Heeze to the neighbouring towns of Geldrop, Someren, Sterksel and Leende.

=== Rail ===
The Heeze railway station is serviced by regional NS trains in the directions of Weert, Eindhoven and Tilburg.

== Gallery ==
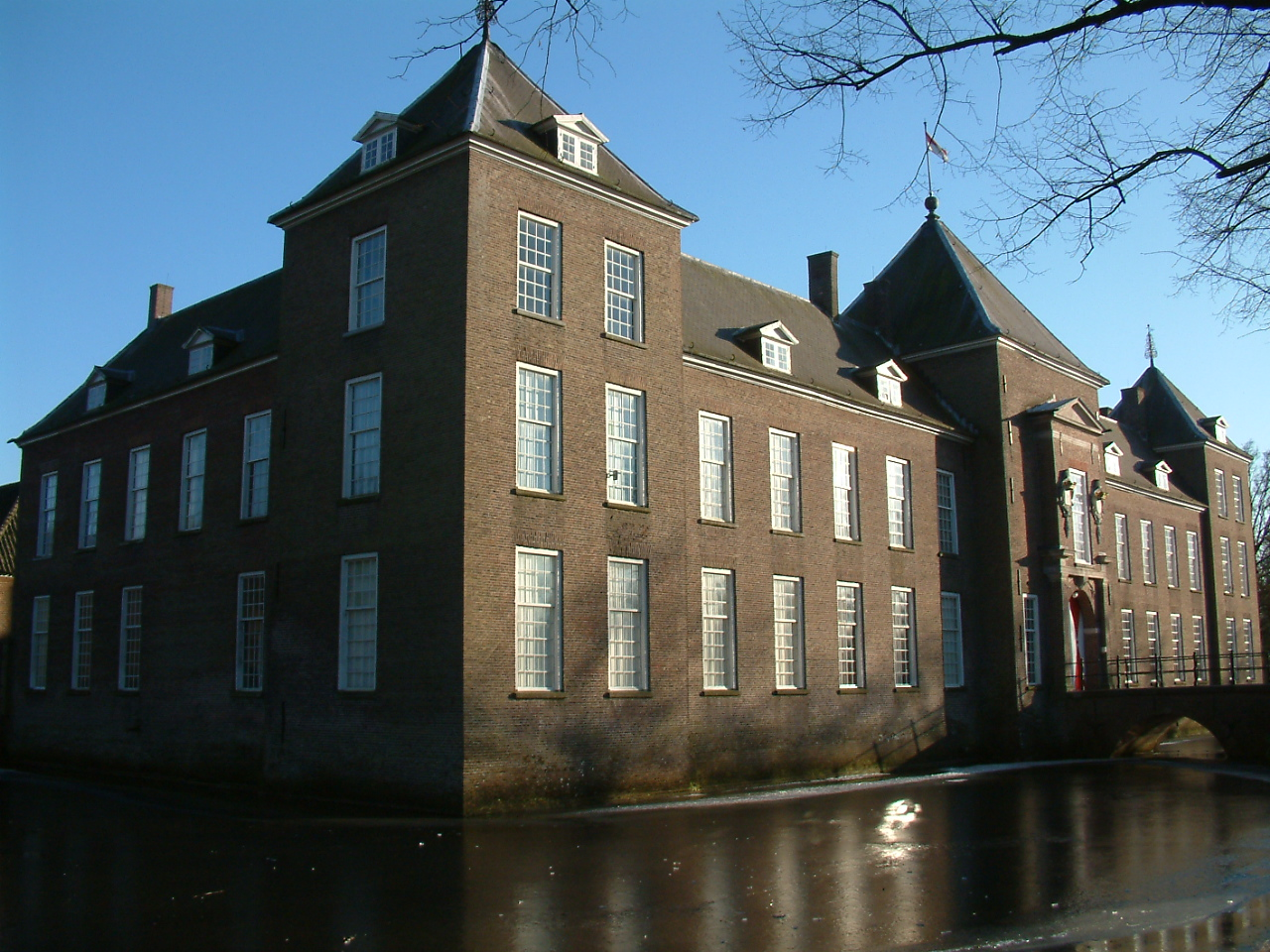
Heeze Castle

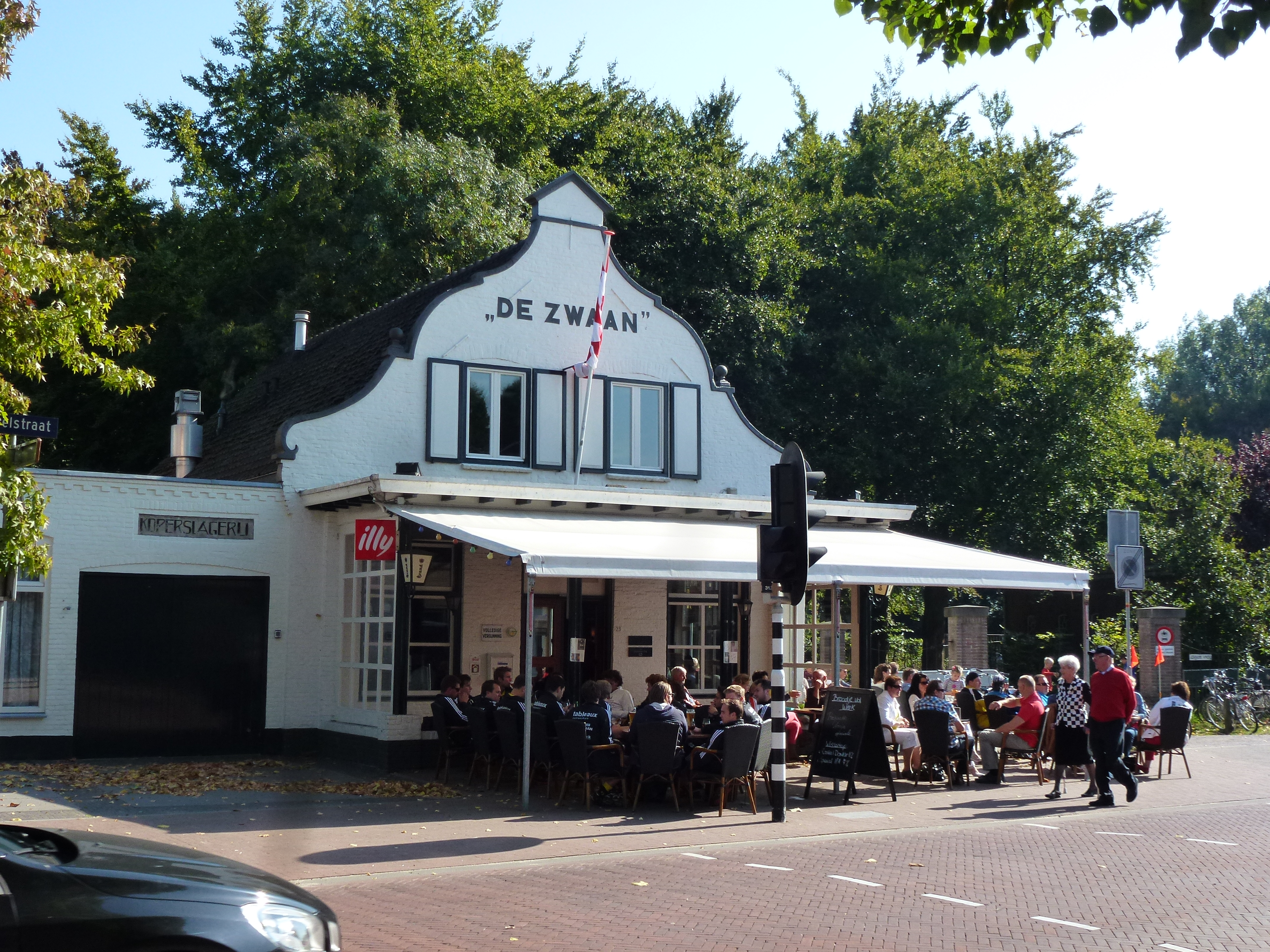
Pub in Heeze

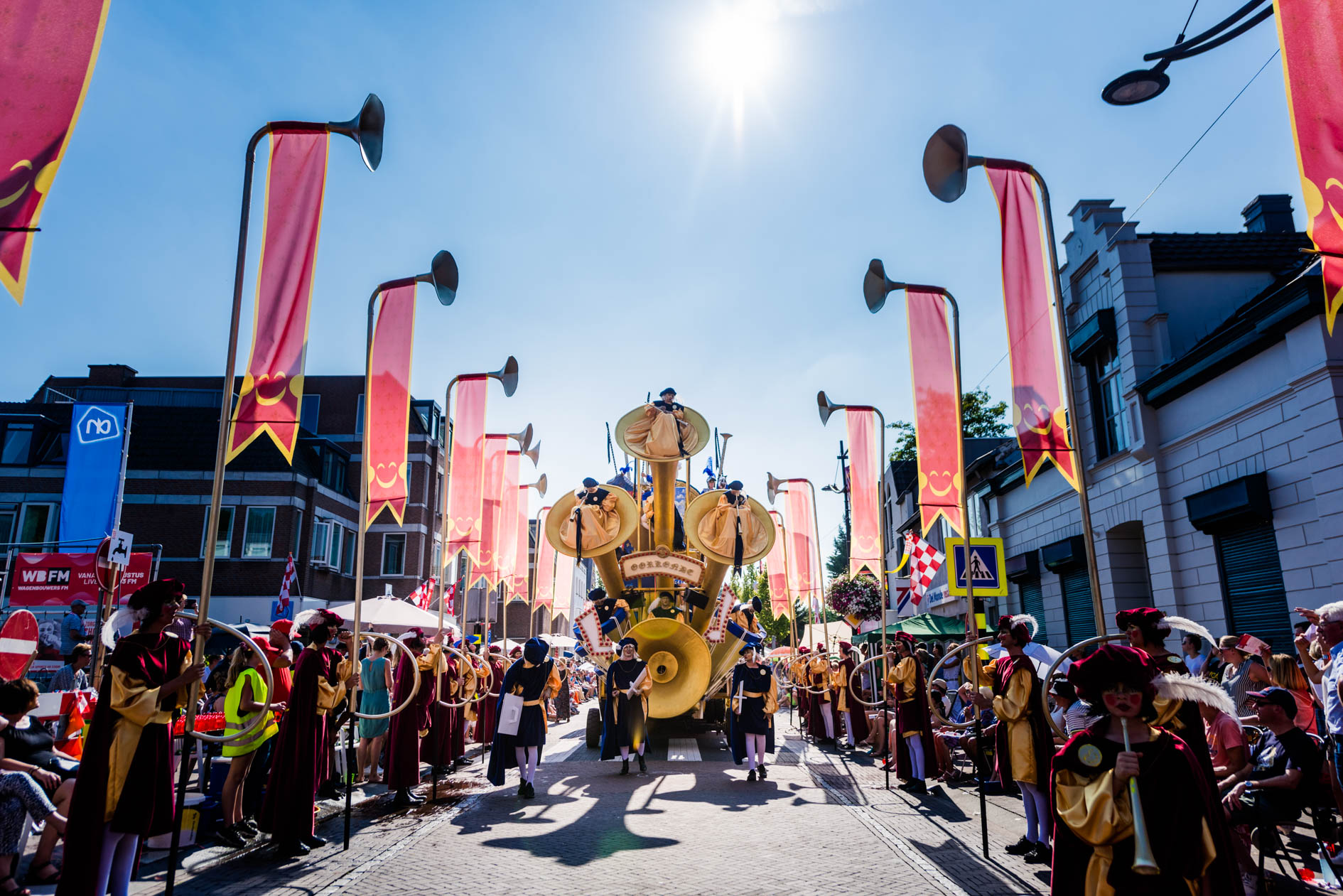
Brabantsedag 2019

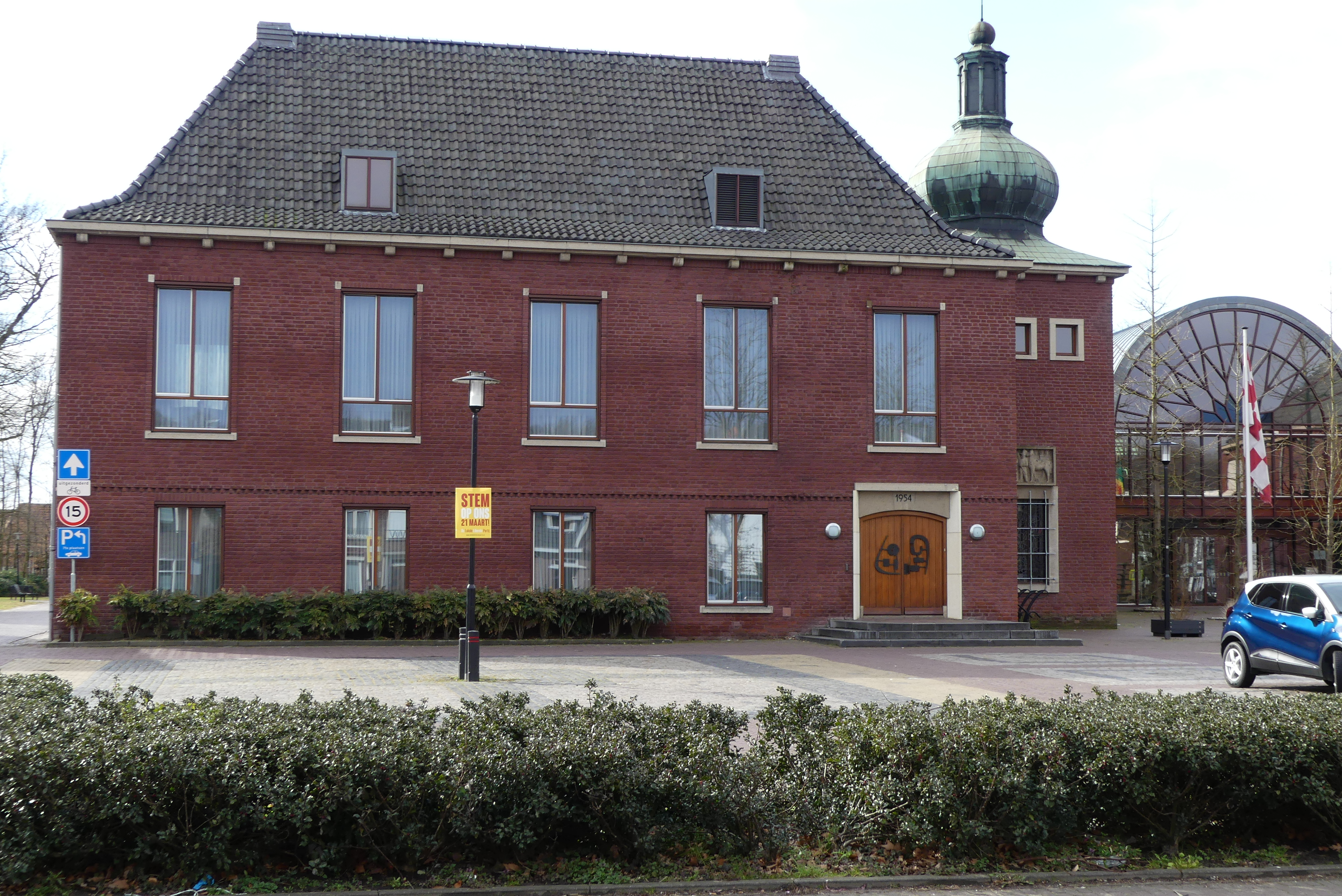
Town hall
