= Achel Brewery =

Belgian brewery

Coordinates: 51.298778°N 5.488572°E

Brouwerij de Achelse Kluis
- Industry: Alcoholic beverage
- Founded: 1998
- Headquarters: Achel, Belgium
- Products: Beer
- Production output: 4500hL
- Website: http://www.achelsekluis.org

Achel Brewery or Brouwerij der Sint-Benedictusabdij de Achelse Kluis was a Belgian Trappist brewery, (the smallest of the Belgian Trappist breweries) until January 2021. It continues to operate as a brewery but is no longer Trappist, as the brewing monks whose presence gave rise to that status have retired. It is located in the Abbey of Saint Benedict in the Belgian municipality of Hamont-Achel.

== History ==
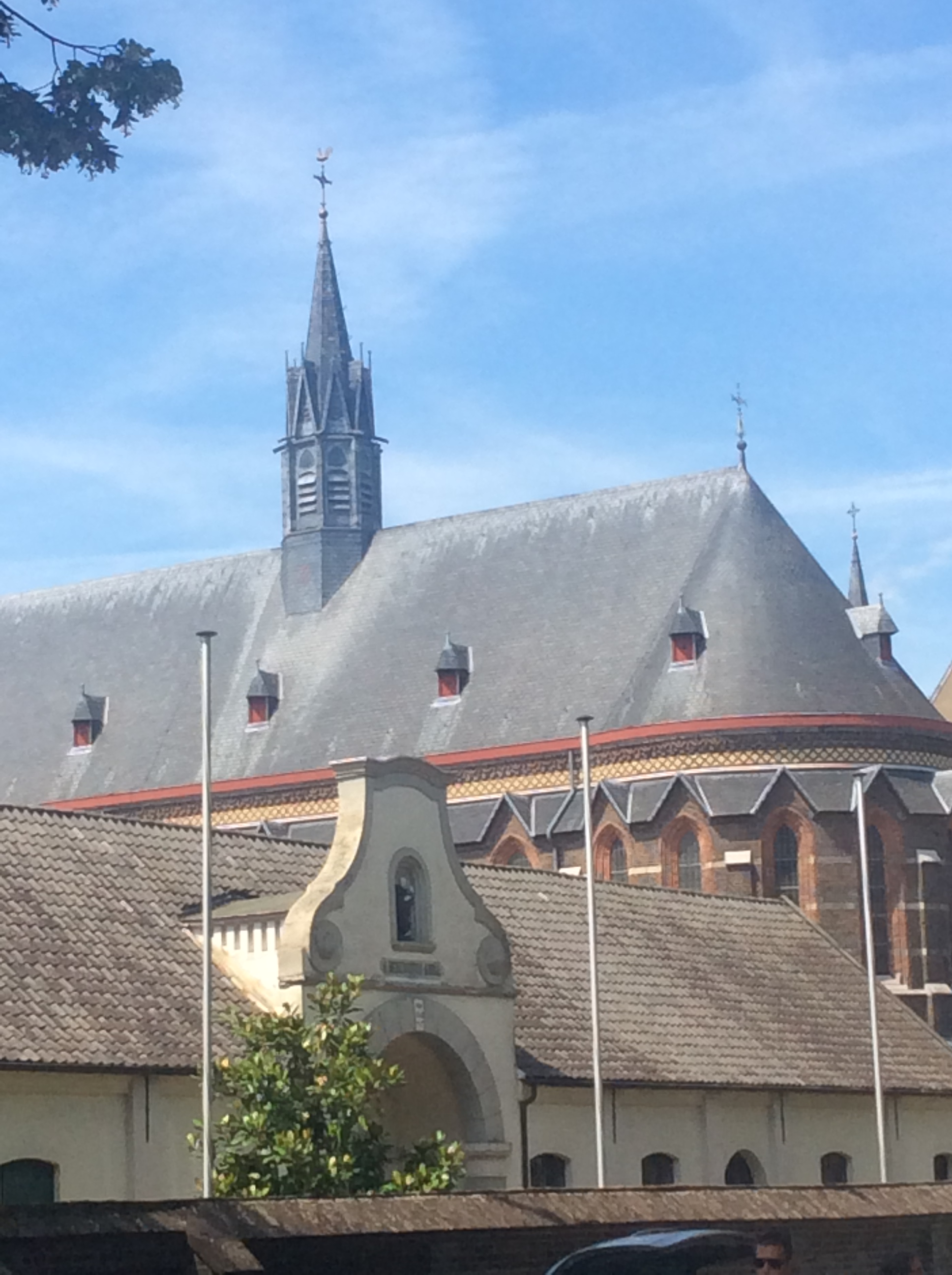
View of the entrance Achelse Kluis

The history of the brewery goes back to 1648, when Dutch monks built a chapel in Achel. The chapel became an abbey in 1686, but was destroyed during the period of the French Revolution. In 1844, the ruins were rebuilt by monks from Westmalle, and various farming activities began. The first beer to be brewed on the site was the Patersvaatje in 1852, and 19 years later in 1871, the site became a Trappist monastery, with beer brewing a regular activity.

In 1914 during World War I, the monks left the abbey due to German occupation. The Germans dismantled the brewery in 1917 to salvage the approximately 700 kg of copper. In 1998 the monks decided to begin brewing again. Monks from the Trappist Abbey of Westmalle and Rochefort Abbey assisted in the building of the new brewery. In 2001, the brewery released the Achel 8° beers.

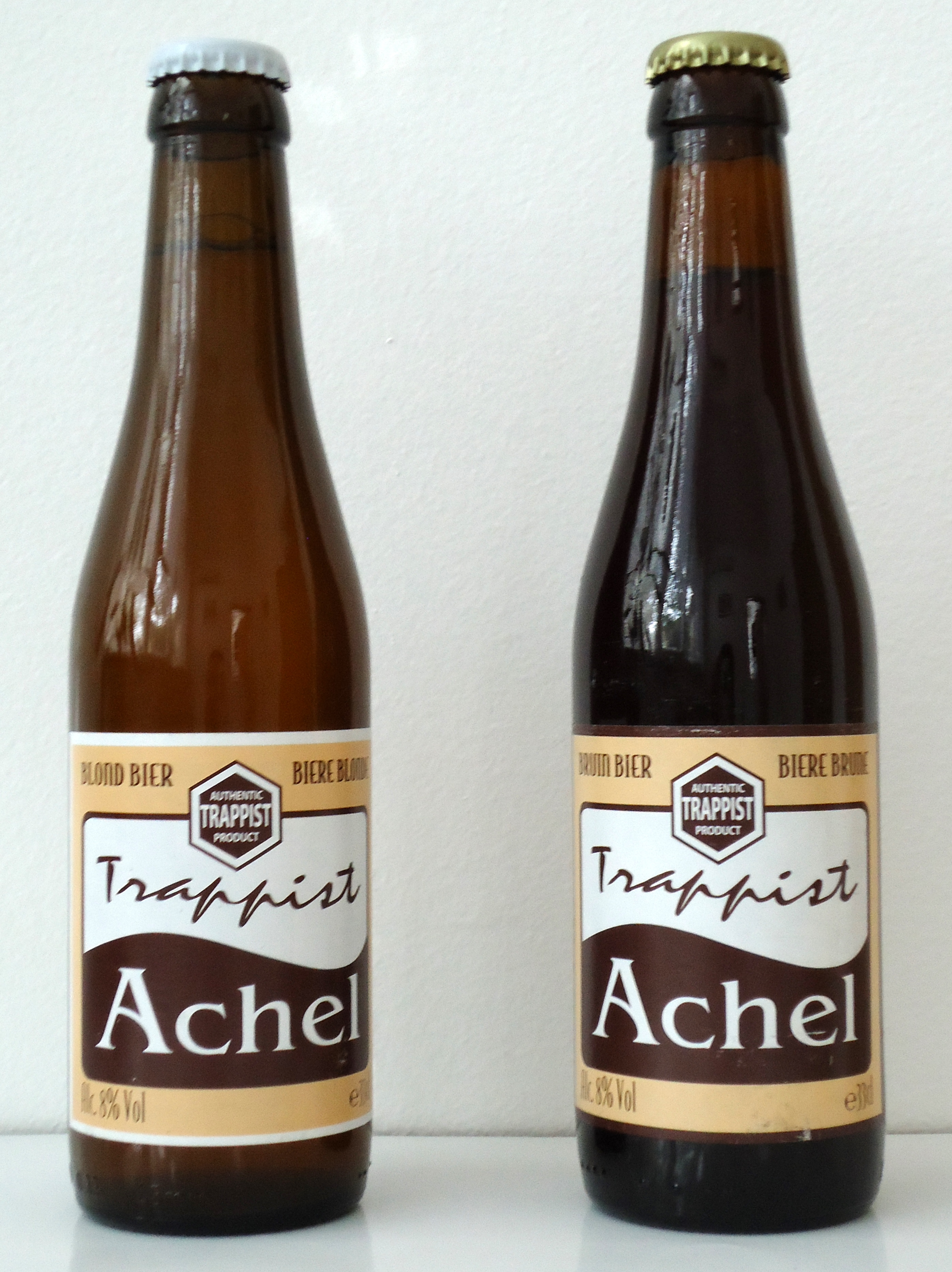
Achel Blond 8° and Bruin 8° beers

Like all other Trappist breweries, the beers were sold in order to support the monastery and charities. In 2021 the monastery closed, with the last two remaining monks moving to Westmalle Abbey. Following closure, the abbey buildings and brewery were bought by Belgian entrepreneur Jan Torman. Beer continues to be produced, but can no longer be sold as Trappist.

== Beers ==
The beers are labelled by their alcohol percentage and colour, with "Bruin" and "Blond" meaning "brown" and "blonde" in Dutch.

- Achel Blond 8°, 8% ABV
- Achel Bruin 8°, 8% ABV
- Achel Extra, 9.5% ABV Blond (75cl only)
- Achel Extra, 9.5% ABV Bruin (75cl only)

Before 2017, there were Achel Blond 5°, Achel Bruin 5°.
