= Open vowel =

Type of vowel sound

IPA: Vowels

	Front	Central	Back
Close	i y	ɨ ʉ	ɯ u
Near-close	ɪ ʏ		ʊ
Close-mid	e ø	ɘ ɵ	ɤ o
Mid	e̞ ø̞	ə	ɤ̞ o̞
Open-mid	ɛ œ	ɜ ɞ	ʌ ɔ
Near-open	æ	ɐ
Open	a ɶ	ä	ɑ ɒ

- IPA help
- audio
- full chart
- template

Legend: unrounded • rounded

An open vowel is a vowel sound in which the tongue is positioned approximately as far as possible from the roof of the mouth. Open vowels are sometimes also called low vowels (in U.S. terminology) in reference to the low position of the tongue.

In the context of the phonology of any particular language, a low vowel can be any vowel that is more open than a mid vowel. That is, open-mid vowels, near-open vowels, and open vowels can all be considered low vowels.

== Partial list ==
The open vowels with dedicated symbols in the International Phonetic Alphabet are:

- open front unrounded vowel [a]
- open front rounded vowel [ɶ]
- open back unrounded vowel [ɑ]
- open back rounded vowel [ɒ]

There also are central vowels that do not have dedicated symbols in the IPA:

- open central unrounded vowel [ä] or [ɐ̞] (commonly written [a] as if it were front)
- open central rounded vowel [ɒ̈]

There is no unambiguous way of transcribing the open central vowels (but see obsolete/nonstandard IPA ᴀ). The diaeresis indicates centralization, so ⟨ä⟩ could mean near-front and ⟨ɒ̈⟩ could mean near-back. However, in practice the diaeresis is assumed to mean central, while ⟨a̠⟩ and ⟨ɒ̟⟩ are used for the front and back articulations, respectively.

The extremely rare contrast between open front, central and back unrounded vowels has been reported to occur in the Hamont-Achel dialect of Limburgish, which features long versions of these sounds, as well as short versions of the open front and back vowels. The short versions do not contrast directly with the open central vowel, which can only be long.

== See also ==
- Close vowel

== Bibliography ==
- Verhoeven, Jo (2007), "The Belgian Limburg dialect of Hamont", Journal of the International Phonetic Association, 37 (2): 219–225, doi:10.1017/S0025100307002940

Place →	Labial					Coronal										Dorsal					Laryngeal			
Manner ↓	Bilabial		Labiodental		Linguolabial		Dental		Alveolar		Postalveolar		Retroflex		(Alveolo-)palatal		Velar		Uvular		Pharyngeal/epiglottal		Glottal	
Nasal	m̥	m	ɱ̊	ɱ		n̼	n̪̊	n̪	n̥	n	n̠̊	n̠	ɳ̊	ɳ	ɲ̊	ɲ	ŋ̊	ŋ	ɴ̥	ɴ				
Plosive	p	b	p̪	b̪	t̼	d̼	t̪	d̪	t	d			ʈ	ɖ	c	ɟ	k	ɡ	q	ɢ	ʡ		ʔ	
Sibilant affricate							t̪s̪	d̪z̪	ts	dz	t̠ʃ	d̠ʒ	tʂ	dʐ	tɕ	dʑ								
Non-sibilant affricate	pɸ	bβ	p̪f	b̪v			t̪θ	d̪ð	tɹ̝̊	dɹ̝	t̠ɹ̠̊˔	d̠ɹ̠˔			cç	ɟʝ	kx	ɡɣ	qχ	ɢʁ	ʡʜ	ʡʢ	ʔh	
Sibilant fricative							s̪	z̪	s	z	ʃ	ʒ	ʂ	ʐ	ɕ	ʑ								
Non-sibilant fricative	ɸ	β	f	v	θ̼	ð̼	θ	ð	θ̠	ð̠	ɹ̠̊˔	ɹ̠˔	ɻ̊˔	ɻ˔	ç	ʝ	x	ɣ	χ	ʁ	ħ	ʕ	h	ɦ
Approximant		β̞		ʋ				ð̞		ɹ		ɹ̠		ɻ		j		ɰ						˷
Tap/flap		ⱱ̟		ⱱ					ɾ̥	ɾ			ɽ̊	ɽ						ɢ̆		ʡ̆		
Trill	ʙ̥	ʙ							r̥	r		r̠	ɽ̊r̥	ɽr					ʀ̥	ʀ	ʜ	ʢ		
Lateral affricate									tɬ	dɮ			tꞎ	d𝼅	c𝼆	ɟʎ̝	k𝼄	ɡʟ̝						
Lateral fricative							ɬ̪		ɬ	ɮ			ꞎ	𝼅	𝼆	ʎ̝	𝼄	ʟ̝						
Lateral approximant								l̪	l̥	l		l̠	ɭ̊	ɭ	ʎ̥	ʎ	ʟ̥	ʟ		ʟ̠				
Lateral tap/flap									ɺ̥	ɺ			𝼈̊	𝼈		ʎ̆		ʟ̆						

		BL	LD	D	A	PA	RF	P	V	U
Implosive	Voiced	ɓ			ɗ		ᶑ	ʄ	ɠ	ʛ
Implosive	Voiceless	ɓ̥			ɗ̥		ᶑ̊	ʄ̊	ɠ̊	ʛ̥
Ejective	Stop	pʼ			tʼ		ʈʼ	cʼ	kʼ	qʼ
Ejective	Affricate		p̪fʼ	t̪θʼ	tsʼ	t̠ʃʼ	tʂʼ	tɕʼ	kxʼ	qχʼ
Ejective	Fricative	ɸʼ	fʼ	θʼ	sʼ	ʃʼ	ʂʼ	ɕʼ	xʼ	χʼ
Ejective	Lateral affricate				tɬʼ			c𝼆ʼ	k𝼄ʼ	q𝼄ʼ
Ejective	Lateral fricative				ɬʼ					
Click (top: velar; bottom: uvular)	Tenuis	kʘ qʘ		kǀ qǀ	kǃ qǃ		k𝼊 q𝼊	kǂ qǂ		
Click (top: velar; bottom: uvular)	Voiced	ɡʘ ɢʘ		ɡǀ ɢǀ	ɡǃ ɢǃ		ɡ𝼊 ɢ𝼊	ɡǂ ɢǂ		
Click (top: velar; bottom: uvular)	Nasal	ŋʘ ɴʘ		ŋǀ ɴǀ	ŋǃ ɴǃ		ŋ𝼊 ɴ𝼊	ŋǂ ɴǂ	ʞ	
Click (top: velar; bottom: uvular)	Tenuis lateral				kǁ qǁ					
Click (top: velar; bottom: uvular)	Voiced lateral				ɡǁ ɢǁ					
Click (top: velar; bottom: uvular)	Nasal lateral				ŋǁ ɴǁ					
