= Hamont-Achel dialect =

Dialect of Limburgish in Belgium

- Haëmets-Achels; Haëmets; Achels
- Pronunciation: [ˌɦæːməts ˈɑxəls] [ˈɦæːməts] [ˈɑxəls]
- Native to: Belgium
- Region: Hamont-Achel
- Language family: Indo-European: Germanic; West Germanic; Istvaeonic; Low Franconian; Meuse-Rhenish; Limburgish; West Limburgish; Dommellands; Hamont-Achel dialect

Language codes
- ISO 639-3: –
- Glottolog: None

Hamont-Achel dialect (Dutch: Hamonts-Achels, Limburgish: Haëmets-Achels) or Hamont-Achel Limburgish is the city dialect and variant of Limburgish spoken in the Belgian city of Hamont-Achel alongside the Dutch language (with which it is not mutually intelligible).

Native speakers of the dialect tend to call it either Haëmets or Achels, depending on where they are from (the former city of Hamont or the former village of Achel).

== Phonology ==
The following section describes the dialect as it is spoken in Hamont.

=== Consonants ===
Consonant phonemes
		Labial	Alveolar	Postalveolar	Dorsal	Glottal
Nasal		m ⟨m⟩	n ⟨n⟩		ŋ ⟨ng⟩	
Plosive	voiceless	p ⟨p⟩	t ⟨t⟩		k ⟨k⟩	
Plosive	voiced	b ⟨b⟩	d ⟨d⟩			
Fricative	voiceless	f ⟨f⟩	s ⟨s⟩	ʃ ⟨sj⟩	x ⟨ch⟩	
Fricative	voiced	v ⟨v⟩	z ⟨z⟩	ʒ ⟨zj⟩	ɣ ⟨g⟩	ɦ ⟨h⟩
Liquid			l ⟨l⟩		ʀ ⟨r⟩	
Approximant		w ⟨w⟩			j ⟨j⟩	

- /m, p, b/ are bilabial, whereas /f, v/ are labiodental. /w/ is a bilabial approximant [β̞]. In this article, it is transcribed with ⟨w⟩, following the recommendations of Carlos Gussenhoven regarding transcribing the corresponding Standard Dutch phone.
- The word-initial /sx/ cluster can be realized as [ɕx].
- /ʃ, ʒ/ do not occur as frequently as in many other dialects, and can be said to be marginal phonemes.
- /ʀ/ is a uvular trill. Word-finally it is devoiced to either a fricative [χ] or a fricative trill [ʀ̝̊].
- Other allophones include [ɱ, ɲ, tʃ, ɡ]. They appear in contexts similar to Belgian Standard Dutch.
- Voiceless consonants are regressively assimilated. An example of this is the past tense of regular verbs, where voiceless stops and fricatives are voiced before the past tense morpheme [də].
- Word-final voiceless consonants are voiced in intervocalic position.

=== Vowels ===
The Hamont-Achel dialect contains 22 monophthong and 13 diphthong phonemes. The amount of monophthongs is higher than that of consonants.

==== Monophthongs ====
Short monophthongs of the Hamont-Achel dialect on a vowel chart, from Verhoeven (2007:223)

Long monophthongs of the Hamont-Achel dialect on a vowel chart, from Verhoeven (2007:223)

Monophthong phonemes
	Front				Central		Back	
	unrounded		rounded		Central		Back	
	short	long	short	long	short	long	short	long
Close	i ⟨ie⟩	iː ⟨iê⟩	y ⟨uu⟩	yː ⟨uû⟩			u ⟨oe⟩	uː ⟨oê⟩
Close-mid	e ⟨i⟩	eː ⟨ee⟩	ø ⟨u⟩	øː ⟨eu⟩	ə ⟨e⟩			oː ⟨oo⟩
Open-mid	ɛ ⟨e⟩	ɛː ⟨èè⟩	œ ⟨ö⟩	œː ⟨äö⟩	ə ⟨e⟩		ɔ ⟨o⟩	ɔː ⟨ao⟩
Open	æ ⟨è⟩	æː ⟨ae⟩				aː ⟨aa⟩	ɑ ⟨a⟩	ɑː ⟨â⟩

On average, long vowels are 95 ms longer than short vowels. This is very similar to Belgian Standard Dutch, in which the difference is 105 ms.

The quality of the monophthongs is as follows:

- /i, iː, u, uː, eː, oː, ɛ, ɛː, ɔ, ɔː, ɑː/ are similar to the corresponding cardinal vowels [i, u, e, o, ɛ, ɔ, ɑ], but none of them are quite as peripheral.
- Among the front rounded vowels, /y/, /ø/ and /øː/ are phonetically central like /ə/ and /aː/: ([ʉ̞, ɵ, ɵː]), whereas /yː, œ/ and /œː/ are front [yː, œ, œː], similar to the corresponding cardinal vowels. /y/ is near-close and slightly advanced from the central position. The phonetic distance between it and the close-mid /ø/ is not very great; the same has been reported in the Ripuarian dialect of Kerkrade spoken on the Germany–Netherlands border. At the same time, /ø/ is phonetically similar to the unstressable /ə/ and the two differ mainly in rounding.
- /e/ is somewhat lower and more central [e̠] than /eː/.
- The short /æ/ and /ɑ/ are somewhat higher and more front ([æ̝, ɑ̝̈]) than their long counterparts.

==== Monophthong-glide combinations ====
Unlike in the neighboring dialect of Weert, all monophthong-glide combinations which are not phonemic diphthongs are restricted to the syllable coda. Those are mostly /j/ preceded by a vowel, and they are /uj, uːj, eːj, oːj, ɔj, ɔːj, æːj/ and the marginal /ɑj/. There also are two combinations of a vowel followed by /w/, which are /iw/ and /œw/.

==== Diphthongs ====
Dialect of Hamont-Achel contrasts long and short closing diphthongs. The long ones are on average 70 ms longer than their short equivalents. Centering diphthongs are all long.

Closing diphthongs of the Hamont-Achel dialect, from Verhoeven (2007:221)

Centering diphthongs of the Hamont-Achel dialect, from Verhoeven (2007:221)

Diphthong phonemes
Closing	short	ɛj ⟨ei/ij⟩ œj ⟨ui⟩ ɔw ⟨ou⟩ ɑw ⟨aw⟩
Closing	long	ɛːj ⟨êi/îj⟩ œːj ⟨ûi⟩ ɔːw ⟨ôu⟩ ɑːw ⟨âw⟩
Centering		iːə ⟨ieë⟩ yːə ⟨uuë⟩ uːə ⟨oeë⟩ oːə ⟨oa⟩ ɔːə ⟨aoë⟩

- The starting points of /ɛ(ː)j, œ(ː)j/ are close to the corresponding cardinal vowels [ɛ, œ].
- The starting point of /ɑ(ː)w/ is near-open central [ɐ].
- The ending points of /ɛ(ː)j, œ(ː)j, ɔ(ː)w/ are rather close, more like [i, y, u] than [e, ø, o].
- The ending point of /ɑ(ː)w/ is slightly more open ([ʊ]) than those of the other closing diphthongs.
- The starting points of /ɔ(ː)w/ and /oːə/ are more central than the corresponding cardinal vowels: [ɔ̟, o̟].
- The target of the centering diphthongs is a rather close schwa [ɘ].
- The starting points of /iːə, yːə/ are somewhat lower ([i̞, y˕]) than the corresponding cardinal vowels.
- The starting point of /uːə/ is somewhat lower and somewhat more central ([ü̞]) than the corresponding cardinal vowel.
- The starting point of /ɔːə/ is somewhat higher and somewhat more central ([ɔ̝̈]) than the corresponding cardinal vowel.

=== Prosody ===
Like most other Limburgish dialects, but unlike some other dialects in this area, the prosody of the Hamont-Achel dialect has a lexical tone distinction, which is traditionally referred to as stoottoon ('push tone') or Accent 1, which generally has a shortening effect on the syllable and sleeptoon ('dragging tone') or Accent 2. As in other articles, the latter is transcribed as a high tone, whereas the former is not marked. The difference between Accent 1 and Accent 2 can signal either lexical differences or grammatical distinctions, such as those between the singular and the plural forms of some nouns. It is phonemic only in stressed syllables, an example of a minimal pair is hoes /ˈɦus/ '(record) sleeve' vs. hoes /ˈɦus˦/ 'house'.

== Bibliography ==
- Bernaerts, J. (1991), Hamonts-Achels dialectwoordenboek. Etymologische verkenningen in het dialect van Hamont en Achel, Hamont-Achel
- Gussenhoven, Carlos (2007). "Wat is de beste transcriptie voor het Nederlands?" (PDF) (in Dutch). Nijmegen: Radboud University. Archived (PDF) from the original on 25 March 2017.
- Heijmans, Linda; Gussenhoven, Carlos (1998), "The Dutch dialect of Weert" (PDF), Journal of the International Phonetic Association, 28 (1–2): 107–112, doi:10.1017/S0025100300006307, S2CID 145635698, archived from the original (PDF) on 2016-03-04
- Schouten, Bert; Peeters, Wim (1996), "The Middle High German vowel shift, measured acoustically in Dutch and Belgian Limburg: diphthongization of short vowels.", Zeitschrift für Dialektologie und Linguistik, 63 (1): 30–48, JSTOR 40504077
- Stichting Kirchröadsjer Dieksiejoneer (1997) [1987], Kirchröadsjer Dieksiejoneer (in Dutch) (2nd ed.), Kerkrade: Stichting Kirchröadsjer Dieksiejoneer, ISBN 90-70246-34-1
- Verhoeven, Jo; Van Bael, Christophe (2002), "Akoestische kenmerken van de Nederlandse klinkers in drie Vlaamse regio's" (PDF), Taal en Tongval, 54: 1–23
- Verhoeven, Jo (2007), "The Belgian Limburg dialect of Hamont", Journal of the International Phonetic Association, 37 (2): 219–225, doi:10.1017/S0025100307002940
