= Heeze-Leende =

- Municipality
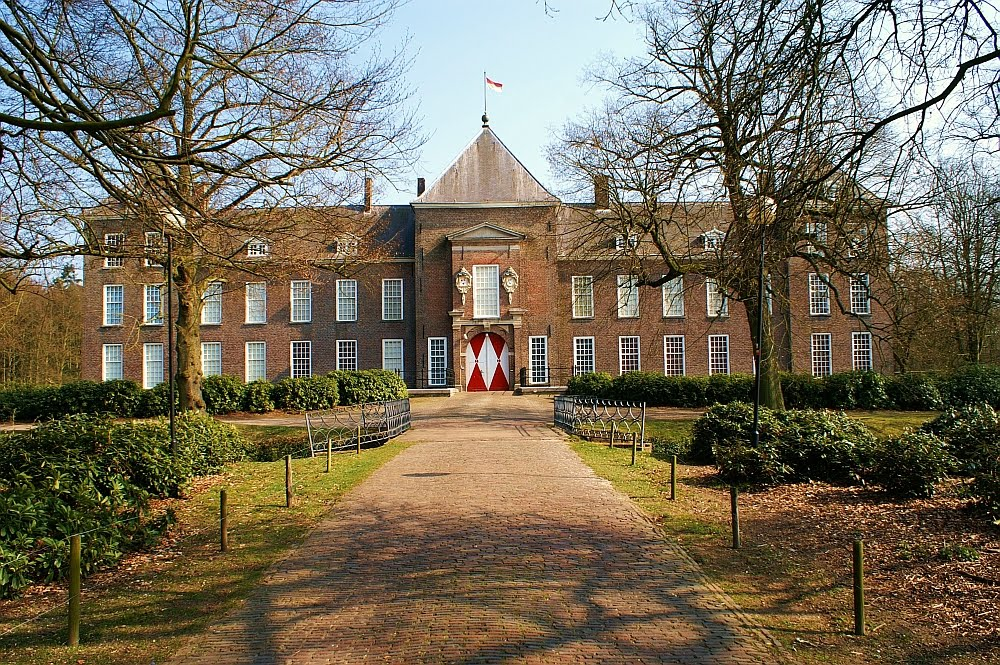
- Heeze Castle

- Flag Coat of arms

- Location in North Brabant
- Coordinates: 51°23′N 5°35′E
- Country: Netherlands
- Province: North Brabant
- Established: 1 January 1997

Government
  - Body: Municipal council
  - Mayor: Teun Heldens (VVD)

Area
  - Total: 105.04 km^{2} (40.56 sq mi)
  - Land: 104.02 km^{2} (40.16 sq mi)
  - Water: 1.02 km^{2} (0.39 sq mi)
- Elevation: 23 m (75 ft)

Population (January 2021)
  - Total: 16,243
  - Density: 156/km^{2} (400/sq mi)
- Time zone: UTC+1 (CET)
  - Summer (DST): UTC+2 (CEST)
- Postcode: 5590–5595, 6029
- Area code: 040
- Website: www.heeze-leende.nl

Heeze-Leende (Dutch pronunciation: [ˌɦeːzə ˈleːndə]) is a municipality in the southern Netherlands, near Eindhoven, North Brabant. It is known for Heeze Castle (Kasteel Heeze).

The spoken language is "Heeze-en-Leendes", a distinct dialect within the East Brabantian dialect group and is very similar to colloquial Dutch.

== Population centres ==
- Heeze
- Leende
- Sterksel

=== Topography ===
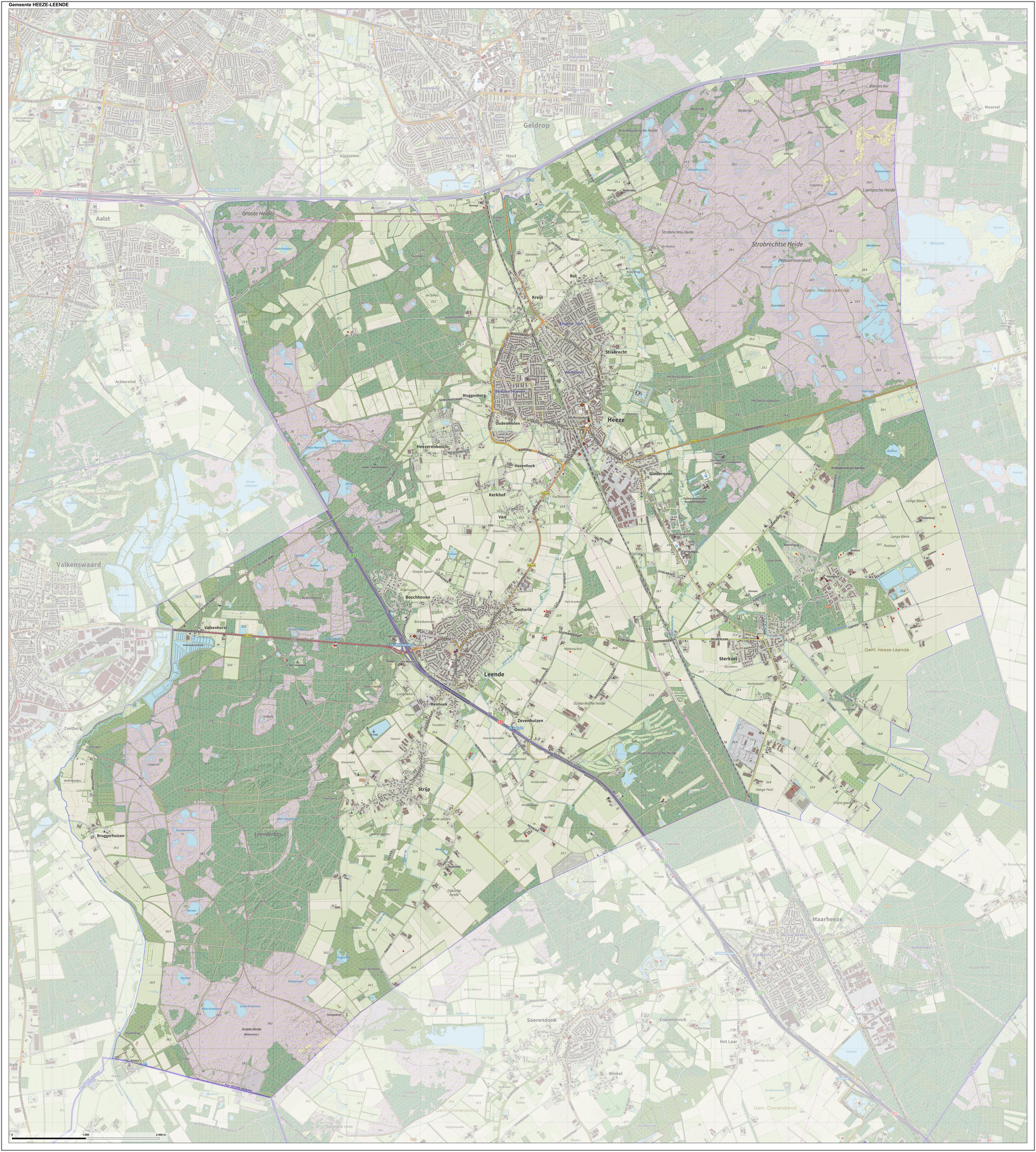

Dutch Topographic map of the municipality of Heeze-Leende, June 2015

== Notable people ==
- Jan Moninckx (ca.1656 in Leende - 1714) a Dutch botanical artist and painter
- Laurentius Nicolaas Deckers (1883 in Heeze – 1978) a Dutch politician, diplomat and agronomist.
- Thomas Horsten (born 1994 in Heeze) a Dutch professional footballer

== Gallery ==
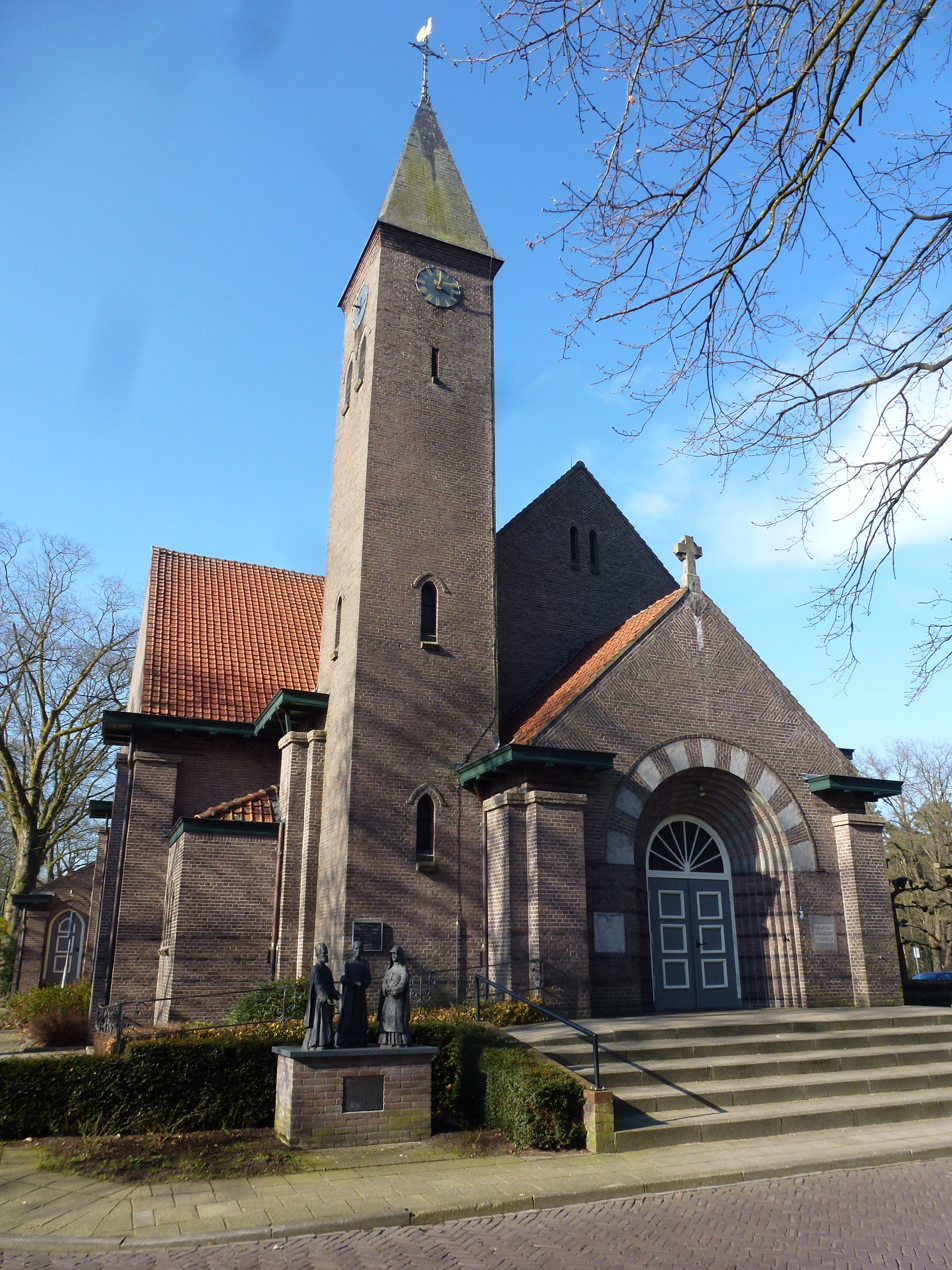
Catharinakerk, Beukenlaan, Sterksel

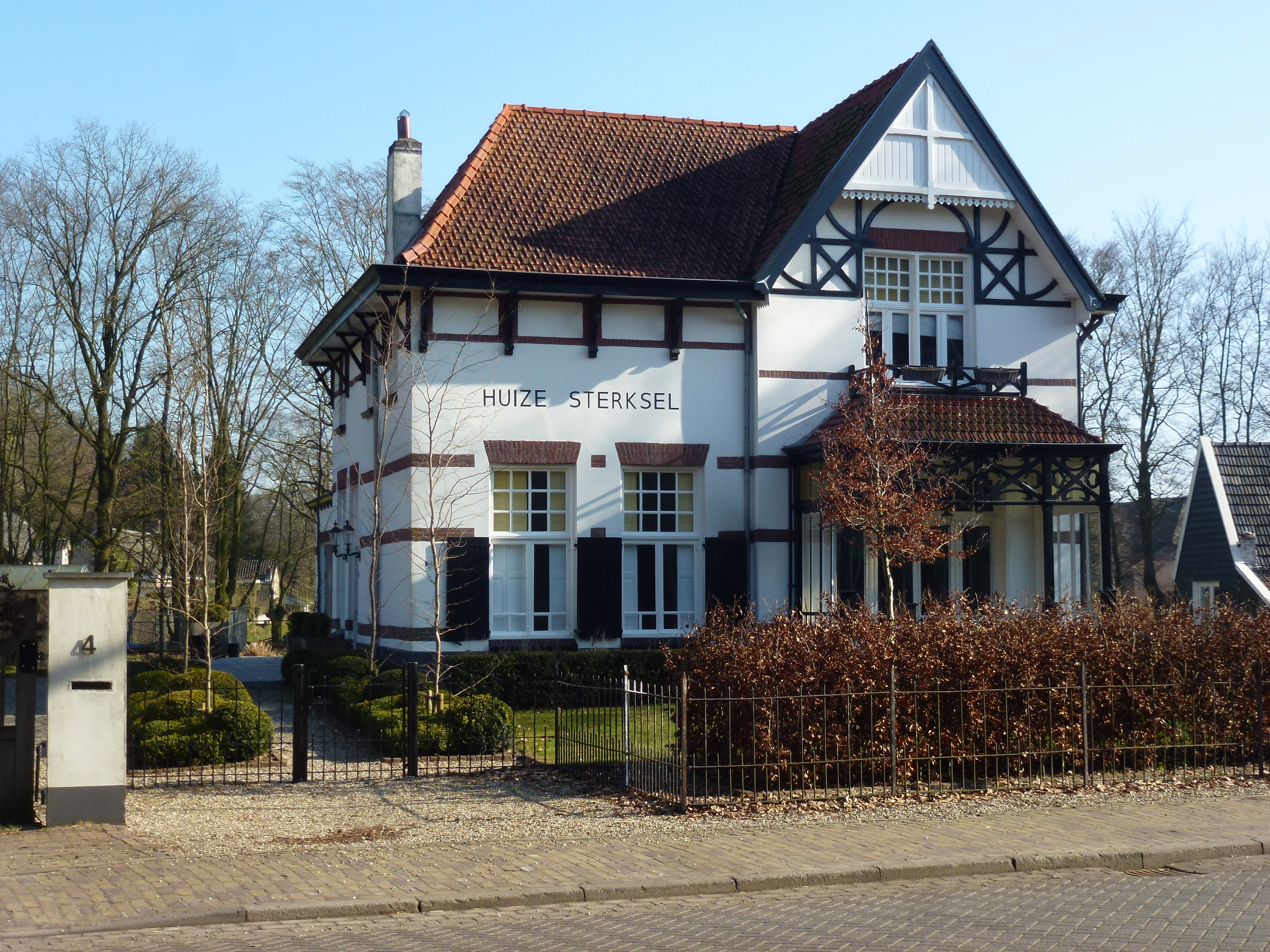
Pastoor Thijsenlaan, Sterksel

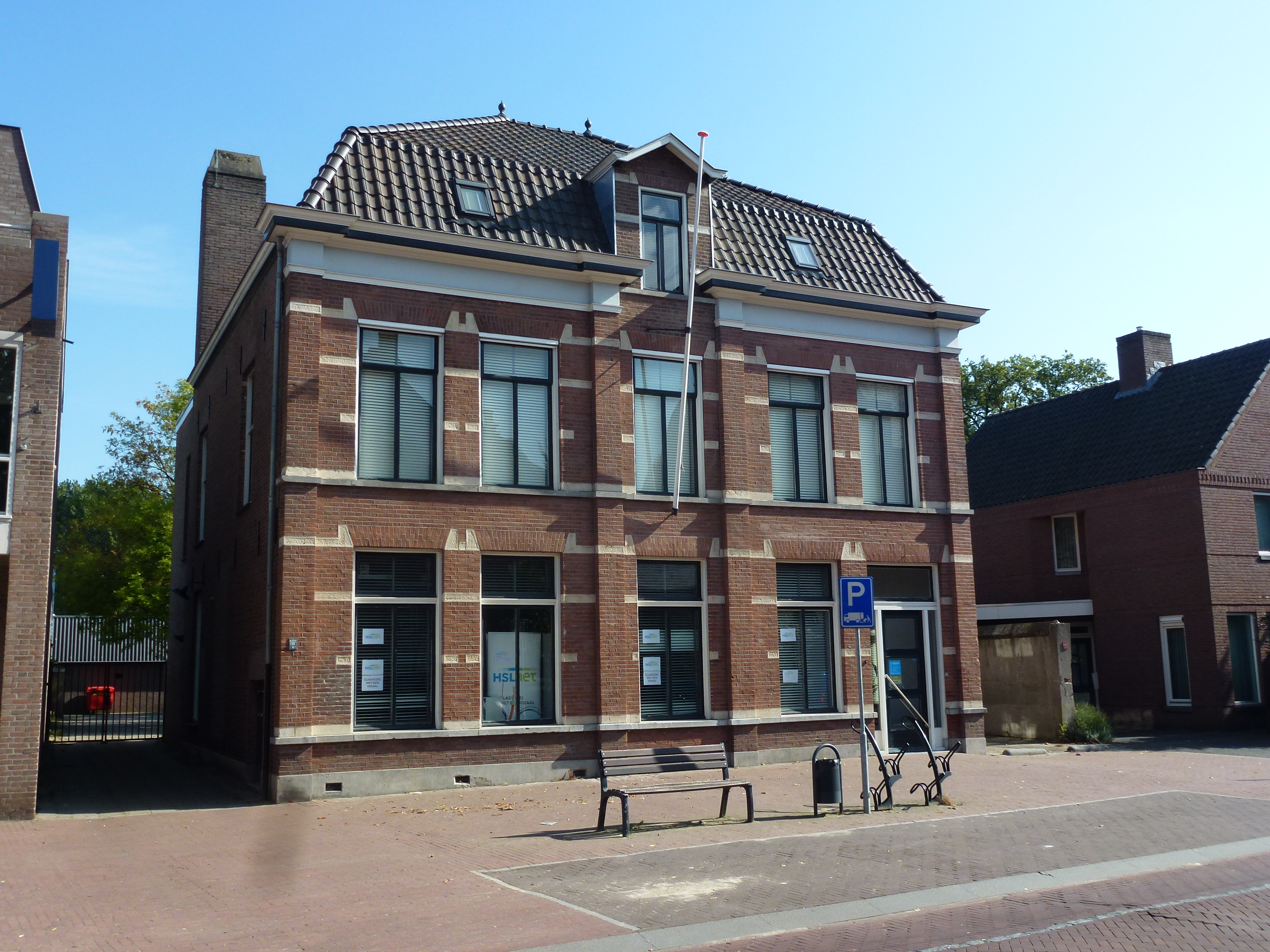
Jan Deckersstraat, Heeze

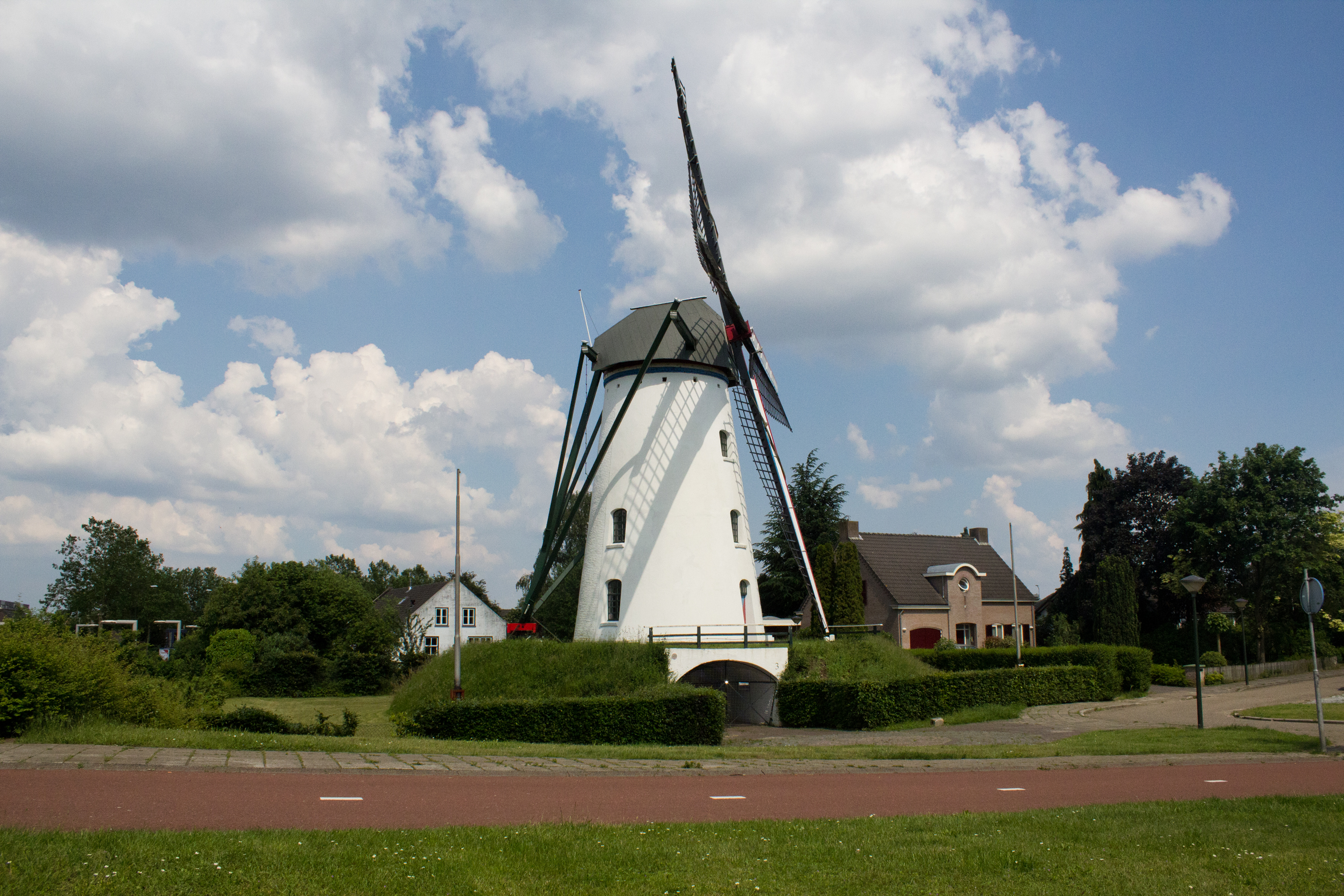
Molen, Sint Victor Geldrop
