= Sterksel =

- Village
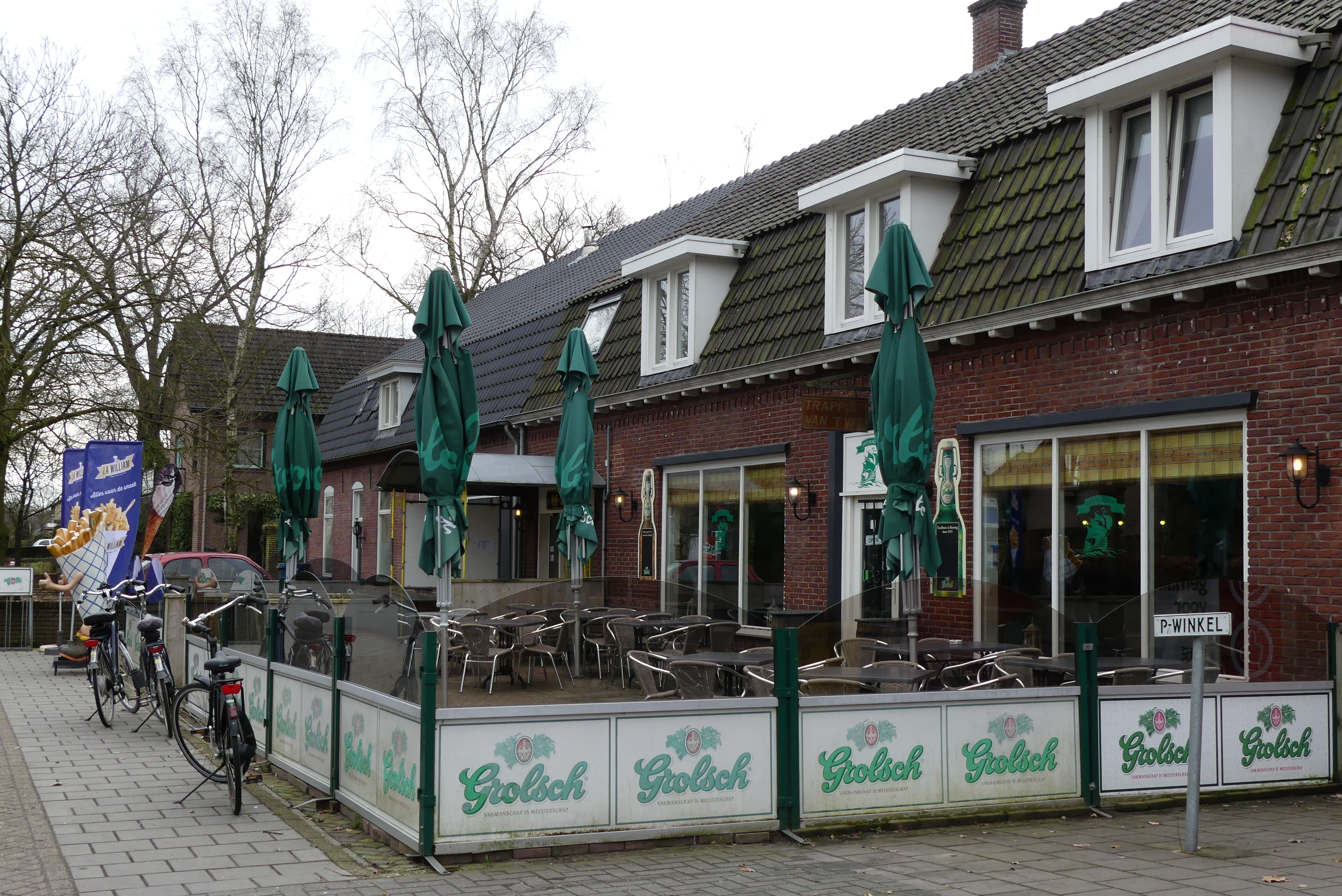
- Snackbar in Sterksel

- Location within North Brabant Location within Netherlands Location within Europe
- Coordinates: 51°21′2″N 5°36′43″E
- Country: Netherlands
- Province: North Brabant
- Municipality: Heeze-Leende

Area
  - Total: 17.62 km^{2} (6.80 sq mi)
- Elevation: 27 m (89 ft)

Population (2021)
  - Total: 1,785
  - Density: 101.3/km^{2} (262.4/sq mi)
- Time zone: UTC+1 (CET)
  - Summer (DST): UTC+2 (CEST)
- Postal code: 6029
- Dialing code: 040
- Website: https://www.sterksel.nu/

Sterksel is a village in the southern Netherlands, near Eindhoven. It lies within the municipality Heeze-Leende. It's the smallest village of three in the municipality. The spoken language is "Heeze-en-Leendes", a distinct dialect within the East Brabantian dialect group, quite similar to colloquial Dutch.

== History ==
The village was first mentioned between 1196 and 1198 as Sterkesele. The suffix means "single roomed house". The first part can either be sterk (strong) or sterke (young cow). Sterksel has been an agricultural community from the Middle Ages. Between 1798 until 1915, it was owned by the Pompen family.

Sterksel was home to 99 people in 1840. Broederhuis Providentia is a monastery established in 1915.

== Gallery ==
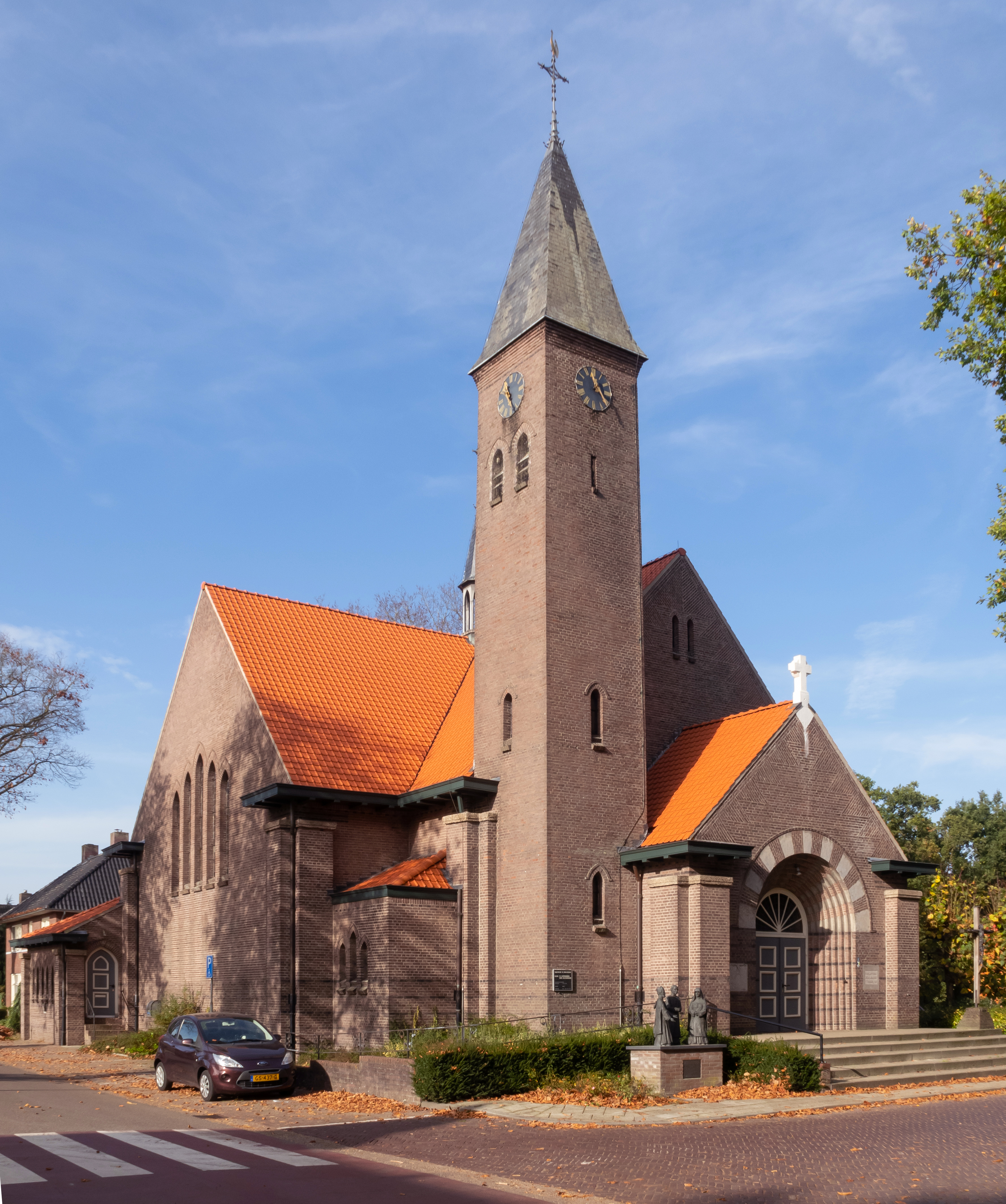
St Catharina Church

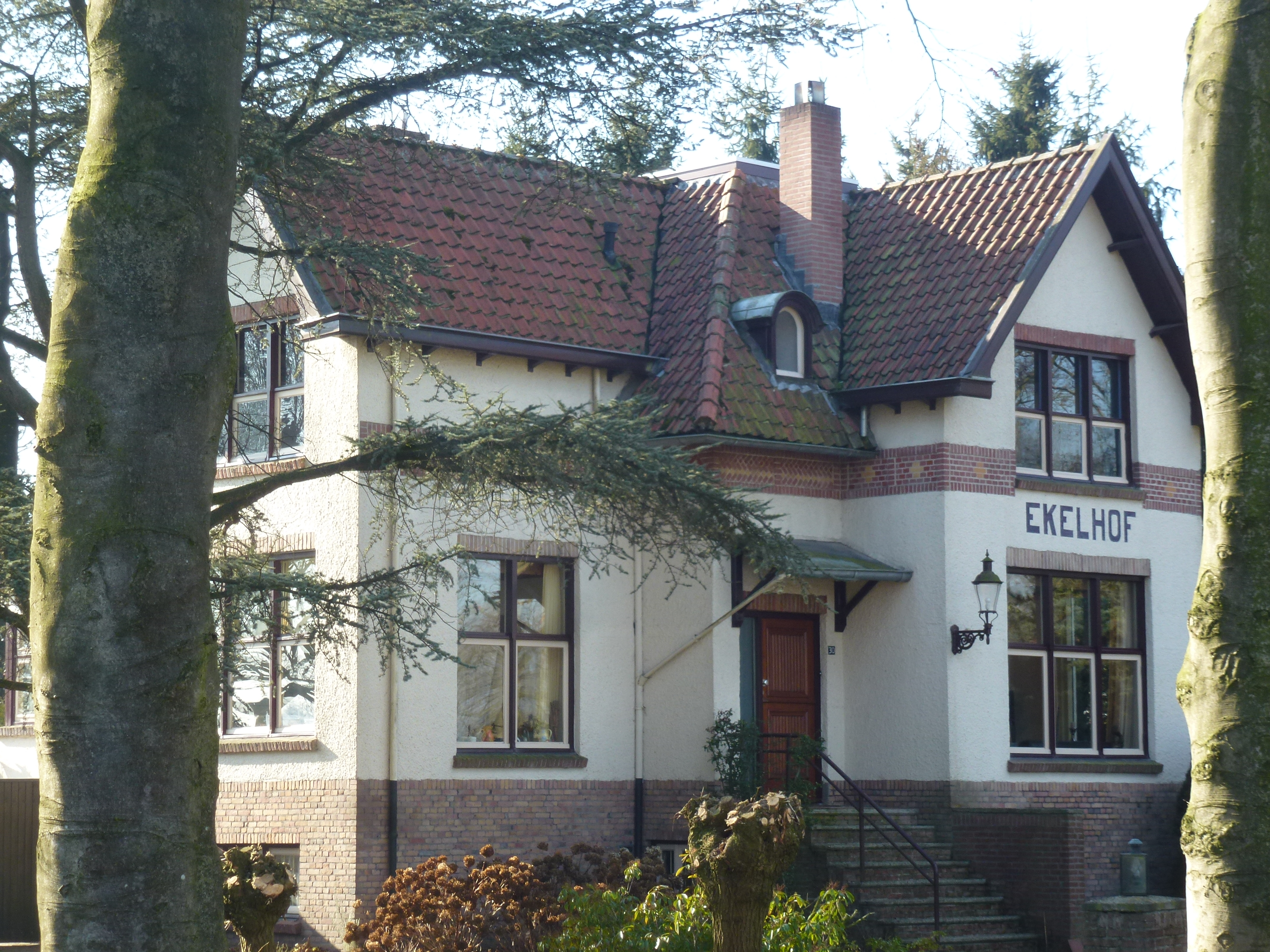
Villa Ekelhof

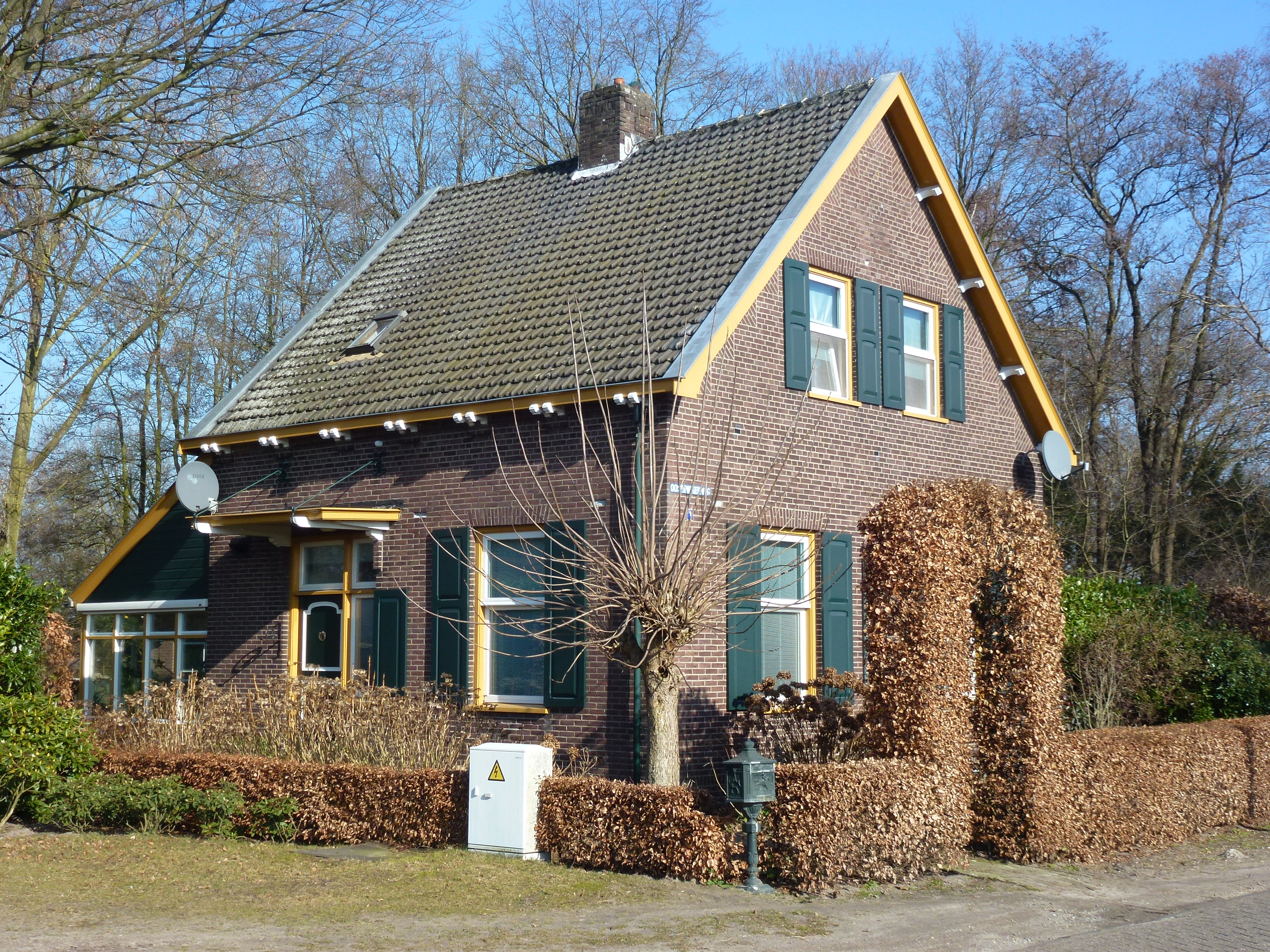
House in Sterksel

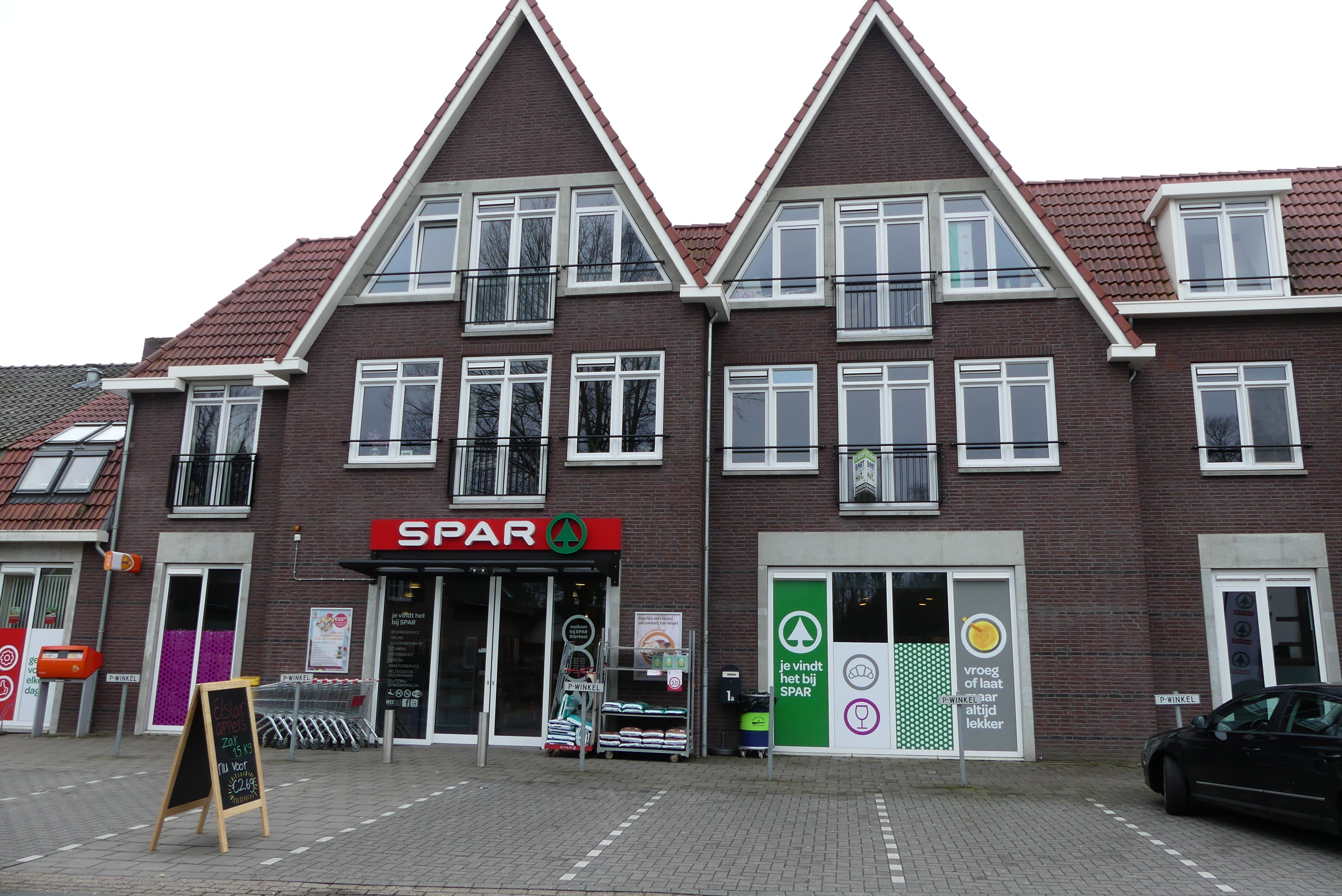
Supermarket
