= Hamont-Achel =

- City and municipality
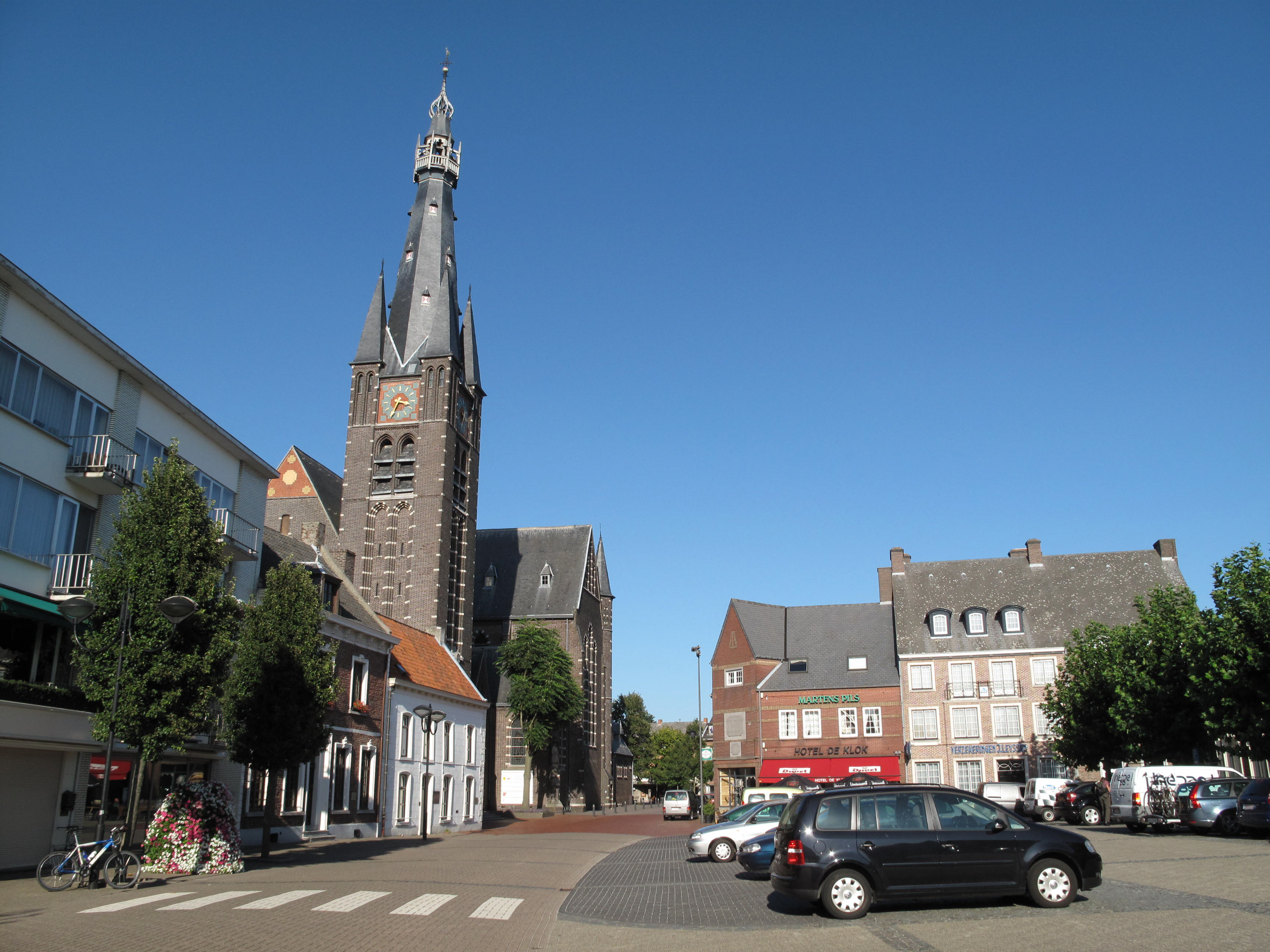

- Flag Coat of arms

- Location of Hamont-Achel in Limburg
- Interactive map of Hamont-Achel
- Location in Belgium
- Coordinates: 51°15′N 05°33′E
- Country: Belgium
- Community: Flemish Community
- Region: Flemish Region
- Province: Limburg
- Arrondissement: Maaseik

Government
  - Mayor: Theo Schuurmans (CD&V)
  - Governing parties: CD&V, Balans

Area
  - Total: 43.73 km^{2} (16.88 sq mi)

Population (2020-01-01)
  - Total: 14,299
  - Density: 327.0/km^{2} (846.9/sq mi)
- Postal codes: 3930
- NIS code: 72037
- Area codes: 011
- Website: www.hamont-achel.be

Hamont-Achel (Dutch pronunciation: [ˈɦaːmɔnt ˈɑxəl]; Limburgish: Haëmet-Achel) is a municipality and city located in the Belgian province of Limburg. It was founded in 1977 by a fusion of the city Hamont and the village Achel. On January 1, 2020, Hamont-Achel had a total population of 14.294. The total area is 43.66 km^{2} which gives a population density of 315 inhabitants per km^{2}. The municipality houses the Trappist Abbey of Achel, part of which is Brouwerij de Achelse Kluis, one of the 11 Trappist breweries.

The professional tennis player Elise Mertens lives in Hamont-Achel.

== Demographics ==
=== Languages ===
- Dutch in Hamont-Achel is often spoken with a distinctive Limburgish accent, which should not be confused with the Limburgish language.
- Limburgish (or Limburgian) is the overlapping term of the tonal dialects spoken in the Belgian and Dutch provinces of Limburg. The Hamont-Achel dialect is only one of many variants of Limburgish.

== Deadly explosion ==
On 18 November 1918, the municipality was the site of one of the worst train explosions in history, when two German munitions trains caught fire and exploded. Not only were the trains destroyed, but three German ambulance trains were also wiped out, along with most of the town. More than 1,000 individuals were killed.

== Tumulus on Haarterheide ==
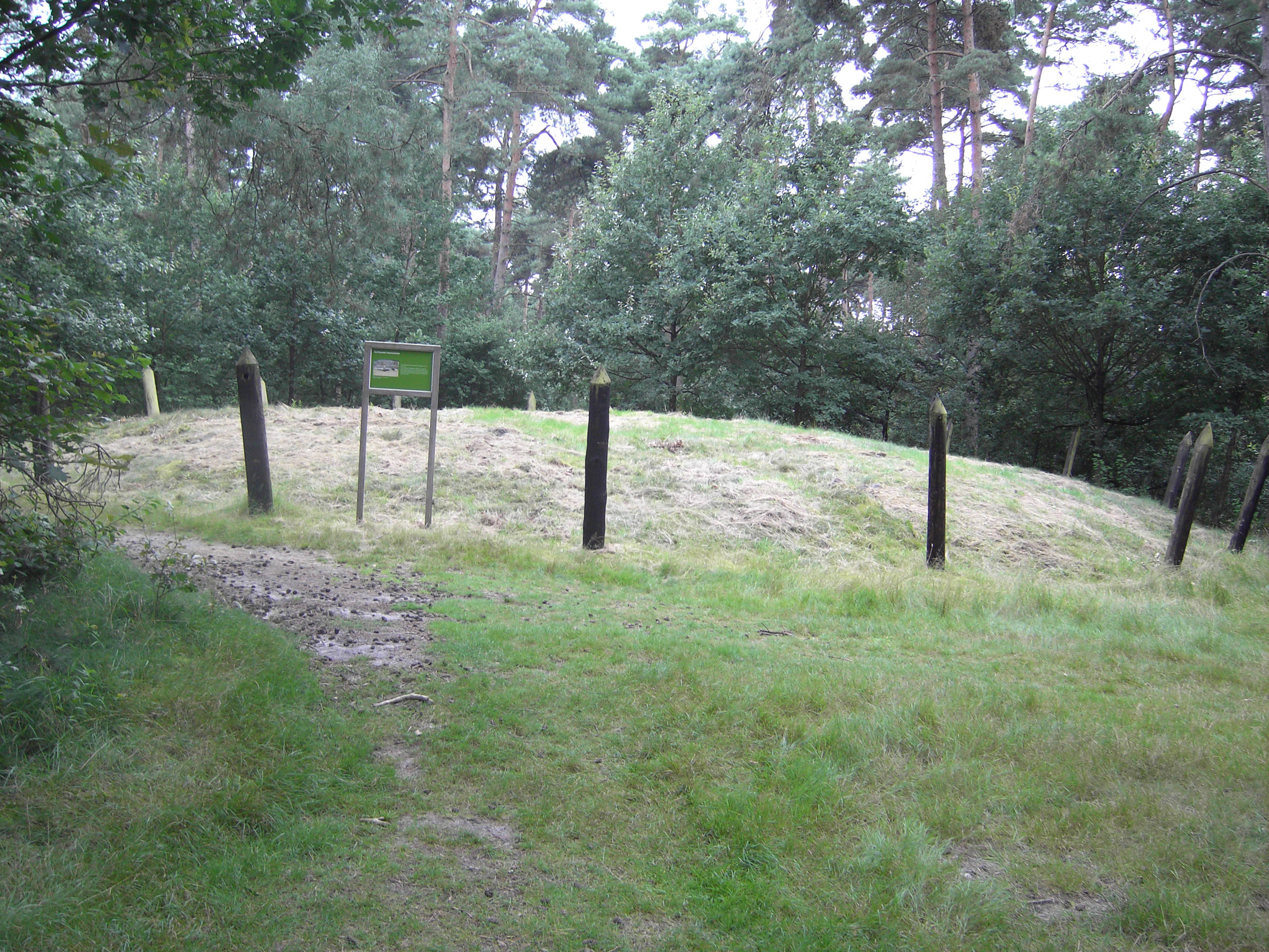
Tumulus (2000-1000 BC)

== Bibliography ==
- Verhoeven, Jo (2007), "The Belgian Limburg dialect of Hamont", Journal of the International Phonetic Association, 37 (2): 219–225, doi:10.1017/S0025100307002940
