= Neal Menzies =

Australian soil scientist

Neal W. Menzies
- Born: 7 December 1959 (age 66); Brisbane, Australia
- Education: University of Queensland
- Scientific career
- Fields: soil science
- Workplaces: Griffith University

Neal Menzies AM (born 7 December 1959) is an Australian professor of soil science at Griffith University. In his early adult years, he completed a bachelor of agricultural science (hons) in 1985, a master of agricultural studies in 1987, and a PhD in 1992. Menzies has worked for the International Institute of Tropical Agriculture (IITA) in Cameroon, the Newcastle University (Newcastle upon Tyne) in England, the University of Queensland, and Griffith University in Australia (where he is currently Pro Vice Chancellor (Sciences))

== Academic career ==
As of October 2022, Neal Menzies has published more than 300 articles in peer-reviewed scientific journals. and had a h-index of 53. In 2011, Menzies was appointed Dean of Agriculture and Head of the School of Agriculture and Food Sciences in the University of Queensland. In 2016 he was elected President of the Australian Council of Deans of Agriculture for a two-year term. Menzies has served as secretary, vice-president and president of the Queensland branch of the Australian Society of Soil Science Inc. (ASSSI), and vice-president and president of the federal ASSSI branch. In addition, from 2006 to 2010, Menzies was elected as vice-president of the International Union of Soil Sciences (a union representing approximately 55,000 soil scientists internationally). In September 2022 he was appointed Pro Vice Chancellor (Sciences) in Griffith University. Menzies is a member of the New South Wales Independent Planning Commission, where he chairs the Mining and Petrolium Gateway Panel.

Menzies has helped attract more than $100,000,000 of research funding since joining the University of Queensland in 1994. He was also a program leader in the Cooperative Research Centre for Contamination Assessment and Remediation of the Environment (CRC-CARE), Associate Editor of the Journal of Environmental Quality, and vice-chair of the organizing committee (and chair of the scientific committee) for the 19th World Congress of Soil Science (WCSS) held in Brisbane, Queensland, Australia in 2010.

His current research focuses largely on the phytotoxicity of trace metals in soil solutions, giving particular consideration to aluminium and other trace metals such as lead, copper, zinc, and nickel. Professor Menzies was one of the first soil scientists to examine the impact of amendments such as agricultural lime and gypsum on soil solution composition and soil chemical fertility. Since this time, much his research has focused on the development of novel plant nutrition technologies, with a focus on improving plant growth and food production in South Asia. His key research colleagues in the University of Queensland Soil Science group include Dr J Bernard Wehr, Dr Peng Wang and Dr Peter Kopittke.

== Selected bibliography ==
- Guppy C N, Menzies N W, Moody P W, Blamey F P C 2005 Competitive reactions between phosphorus and organic matter in soil: a review. Soil Research 43, 189–202.
- Kopittke P M, Asher C J, Blamey F P C, Auchterlonie G J, Guo Y N and Menzies N W 2008 Localization and chemical speciation of Pb in roots of signal grass (Brachiaria decumbens) and Rhodes grass (Chloris gayana). Environmental Science and Technology 42, 4595–4599.
- Kopittke P M, Dart P J and Menzies N W 2007 Toxic effects of low concentrations of Cu on nodulation of Cowpea (Vigna unguiculata). Environmental Pollution 145, 309–315.
- Menzies N W, Donn M J and Kopittke P M 2007 Evaluation of extractants for estimation of the phytoavailable trace metals in soils. Environmental Pollution 145, 121–130.
- Kopittke P M, Menzies N W and Blamey F P C 2004 Rhizotoxicity of aluminate and polycationic aluminium at high pH. Plant and Soil 266, 177–186.
- Menzies N W, Bell L C and Edwards D G 1994 Exchange and solution phase chemistry of acid, highly weathered soils. I. Characteristics of soils and the effects of lime and gypsum amendments. Australian Journal of Soil Research 32: 251–267.
- Menzies N W, Bell L C and Edwards D G 1994 Exchange and solution phase chemistry of acid, highly weathered soils. II. Investigation of mechanisms controlling Al release into solution. Australian Journal of Soil Research 32, 269–283.
- Menzies N W, Bell L C and Edwards D G 1991 Characteristics of membrane filters in relation to aluminium studies in soil solutions and natural waters. Journal of Soil Science 42 585–587.

== Awards ==
- Member of the Order of Australia, 2024
- Award for Excellence in Research, School of Land and Food Sciences, the University of Queensland, 2006
- Award for Outstanding Achievement in Collaborative R&D, Australian Business and Higher Education Roundtable, 2002
- Publication Medal, Australian Society of Soil Science Incorporated, 1989
- Edwin Munro Scholarship in Agricultural Science, the University of Queensland, 1986
- Bell Medal, Australian Institute of Agricultural Science, 1985

== See also ==
- International Union of Soil Sciences (IUSS)
- Australian Society of Soil Science Incorporated (ASSSI)
- World Congress of Soil Science (WCSS)
