= World Congress of Soil Science =

Scientific conference

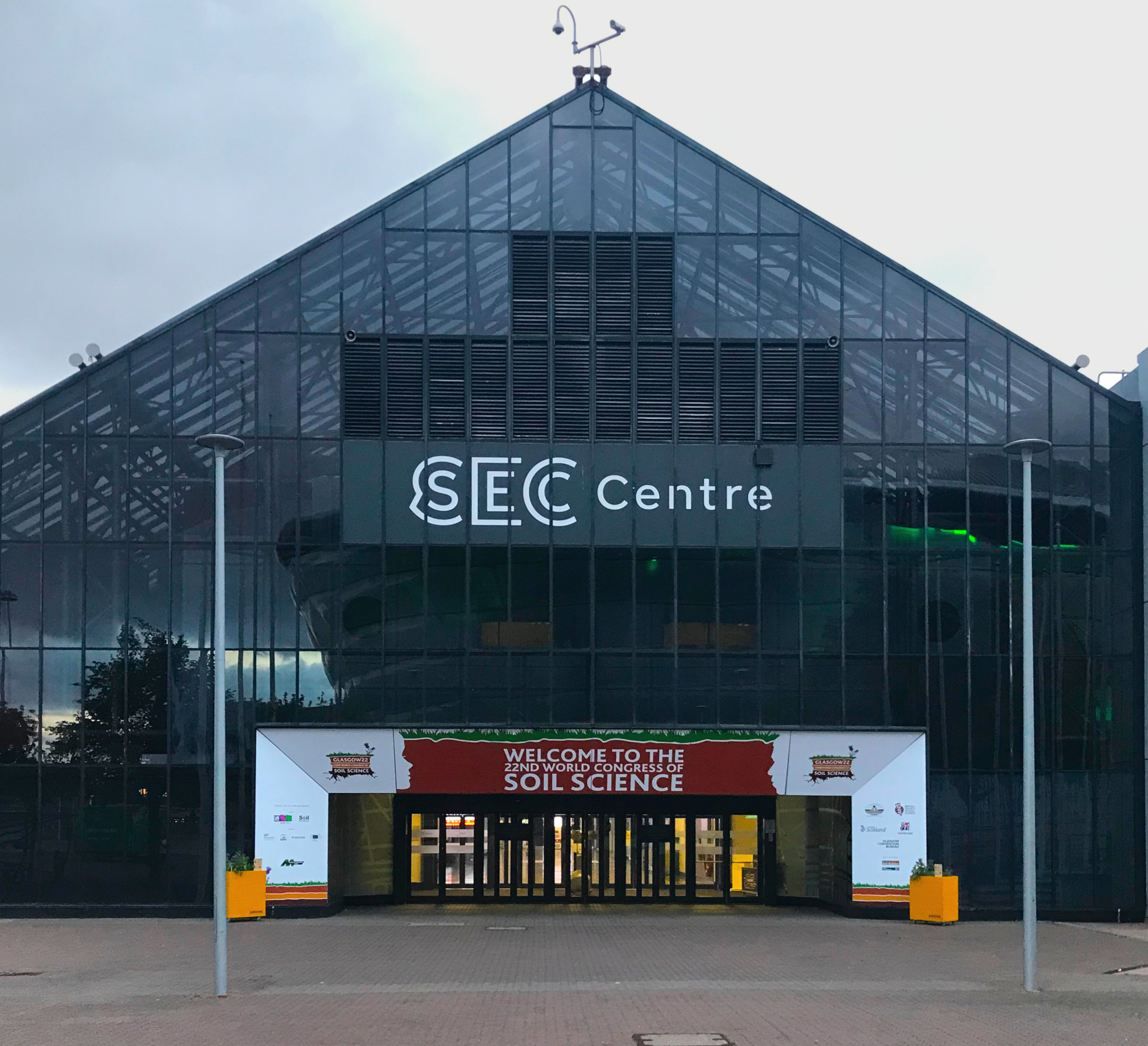
Main entrance of the 2022 edition of the World Congress of Soil Science in Glasgow, United Kingdom

World Congress of Soil Science held in Philadelphia, U.S., in 2006

The World Congress of Soil Science (WCSS) is a conference held every four years (although interrupted by World War II) under the guidance of the International Union of Soil Sciences (IUSS). The purpose of a congress is to: (i) ensure the advancement of soil science and its application, and (ii) to handle the business of the society. Of the 18 congresses, eight have been held in Europe, five in the Americas, three in Asia, one in Australia and one in Africa. The congresses are only open to society members. The number of members attending has steadily increased, with approximately 2000 members attending each congress since the 15th WCSS in Acapulco, Mexico.

The 19th WCSS was held in the week of 1 to 6 August 2010 in Brisbane, Queensland, Australia, at the Brisbane Convention & Exhibition Centre. The congress theme was "Soil solutions for a changing world". The conference was organised by the IUSS President (Roger Swift) and Vice-President (Neal Menzies). The 19th WCSS was the second congress held in Australia (the 9th WCSS was held in Adelaide, Australia, in 1968), and was held in conjunction with the Australian Society of Soil Science Incorporated. The 20th WCSS was held from 8 to 13 June 2014 on Jeju-do Island, South Korea. The 21st WCSS was held in Rio de Janeiro, Brazil, in August 2018, the 22nd in 2022 in Glasgow, Scotland, and the 23rd in 2026 in Nanjing, China. The next WCSS will be 2030 in Toronto, Canada. The 25th WCSS 2034 in Leipzig, Germany, will be jointly organized by the German, the Polish and the Czech Soil Science Society.

Past and future locations for the WCSS:

WCSS	Year	Location
25th	2034	Leipzig, Germany
24th	2030	Toronto, Canada
23rd	2026	Nanjing, China
22nd	2022	Glasgow, Scotland, United Kingdom
21st	2018	Rio de Janeiro, Brazil
20th	2014	Jeju-do Island, South Korea
19th	2010	Brisbane, Queensland, Australia
18th	2006	Philadelphia, Pennsylvania, United States
17th	2002	Bangkok, Thailand
16th	1998	Montpellier, France
15th	1994	Acapulco, Mexico
14th	1990	Kyoto, Japan
13th	1986	Hamburg, Germany
12th	1982	New Delhi, India
11th	1978	Edmonton, Alberta, Canada
10th	1974	Moscow, Soviet Union
9th	1968	Adelaide, Australia
8th	1964	Bucharest, Romania
7th	1960	Madison, Wisconsin, United States
6th	1956	Paris, France
5th	1954	Leopoldville, Democratic Republic of the Congo
4th	1950	Amsterdam, The Netherlands
3rd	1935	Oxford, England, United Kingdom
2nd	1930	Leningrad, Soviet Union
1st	1927	Washington, DC, United States
