= René Tavernier =

René Tavernier may refer to:

- René Tavernier (geologist) (1914–1992), Belgian geologist and stratigrapher
- René Tavernier (poet) (1915–1989), French writer and philosopher
