= Marc Dessauvage =

Belgian architect

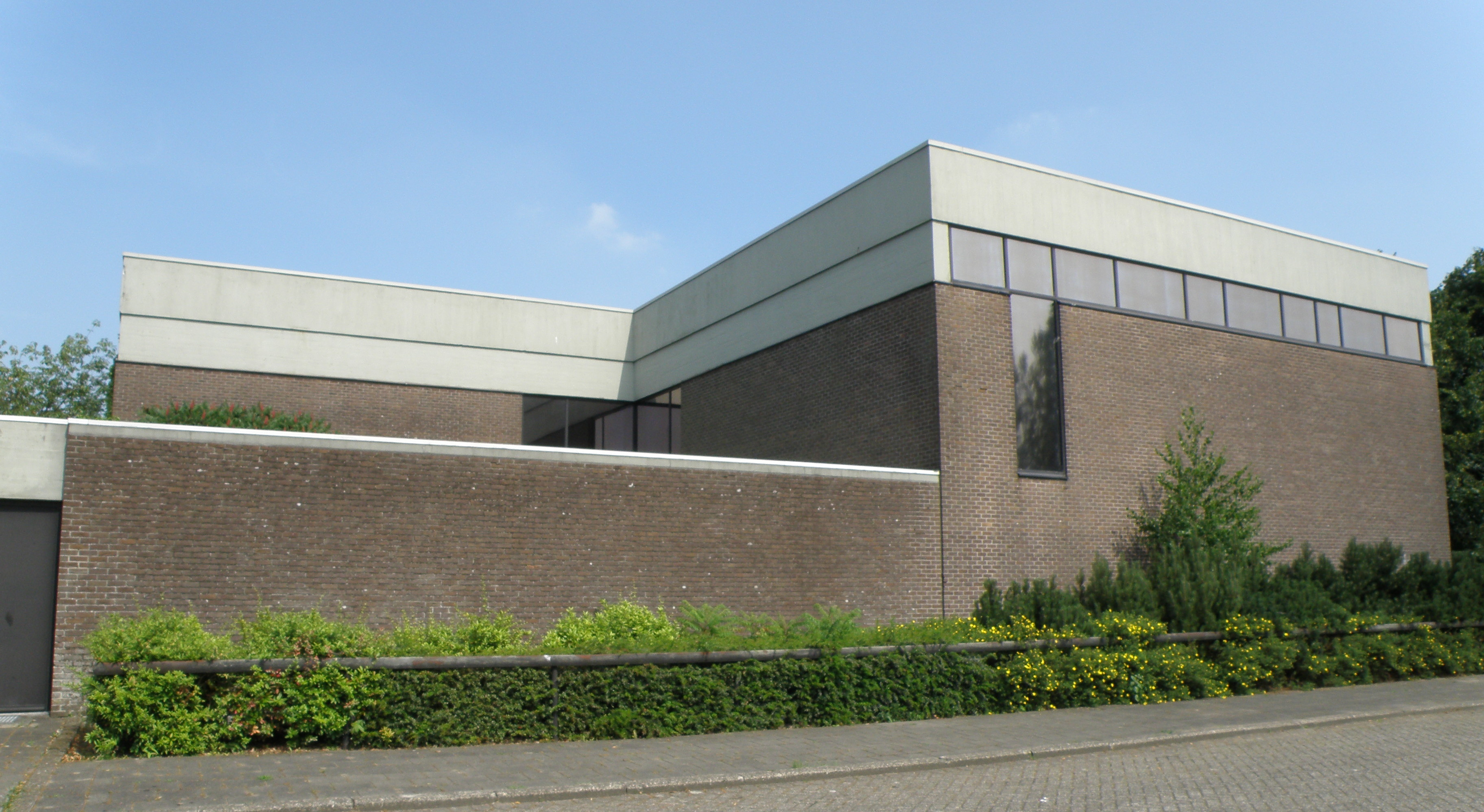
Church of St Joseph the Worker, Vosselaar, 1967

Marc Dessauvage (1931–1984) was a Belgian ecclesiastical architect, active primarily in the 1960s and 1970s. He broke with traditional church architecture to produce modernist buildings that were thought to give expression to the liturgical reforms of the time. In 1959 he won a Pro Arte Christiana design competition, drawing further praise from the Jesuit art theorist Geert Bekaert and the Benedictine liturgist Frédéric Debuyst, which launched him on a 20-year career. His growing deafness made communication with clients problematic. One of his most prestigious designs was for the Faculty of Arts of the Katholieke Universiteit Leuven (1971–72).

== Designs ==
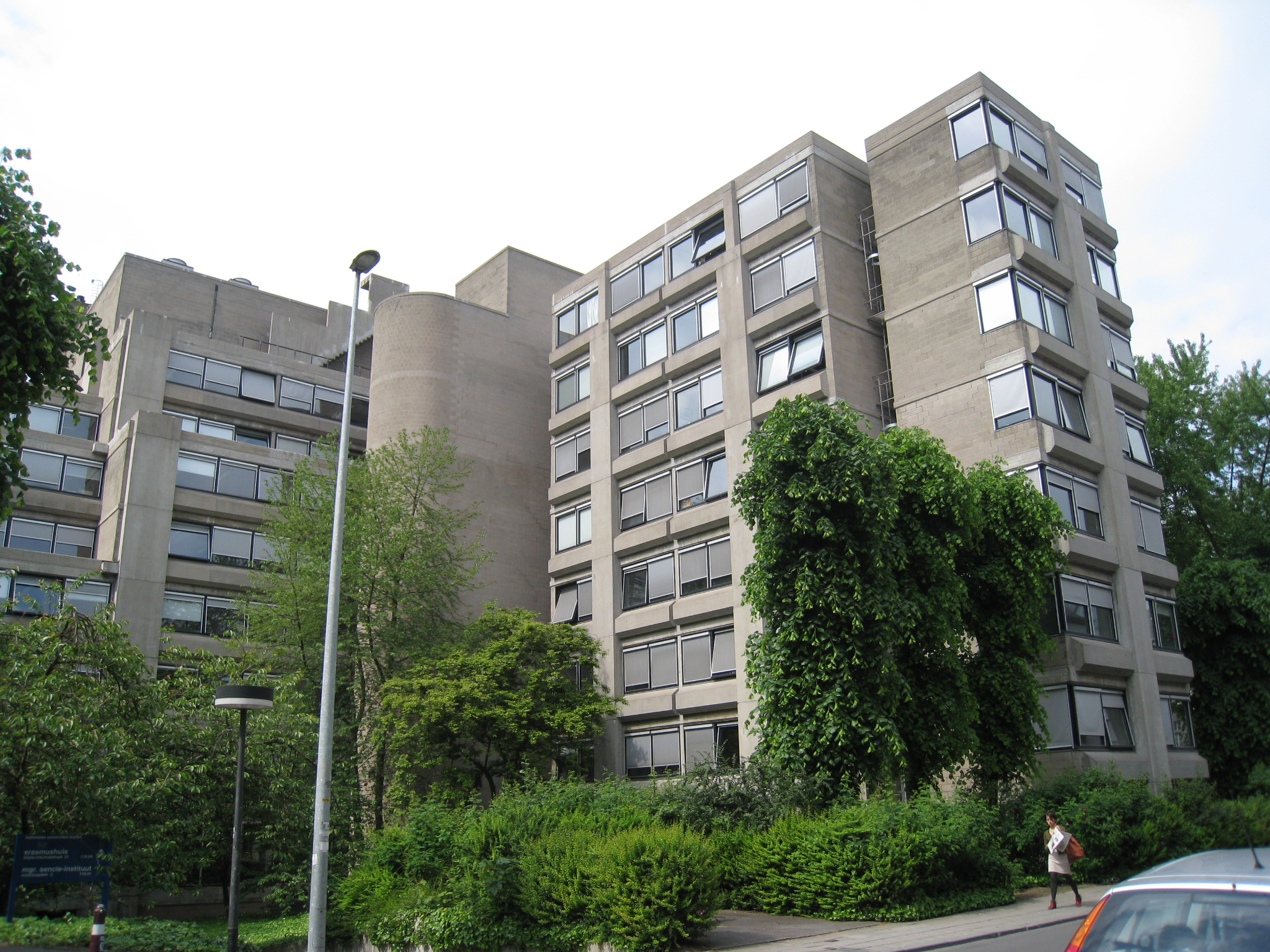
Faculty of Arts, Katholieke Universiteit Leuven, 1971–72

- Church of St Aldegonde, Ezemaal (1962–65)
- Chapel of Sint-Lievenscollege, Ghent (1964–65)
- Monasterium Magnificat, Westmalle (1966–70)
- Faculty of Arts, Katholieke Universiteit Leuven (1971–72)
