= Bertinchamps Brewery =

Brewery in Gembloux, Belgium

Bertinchamps brewery
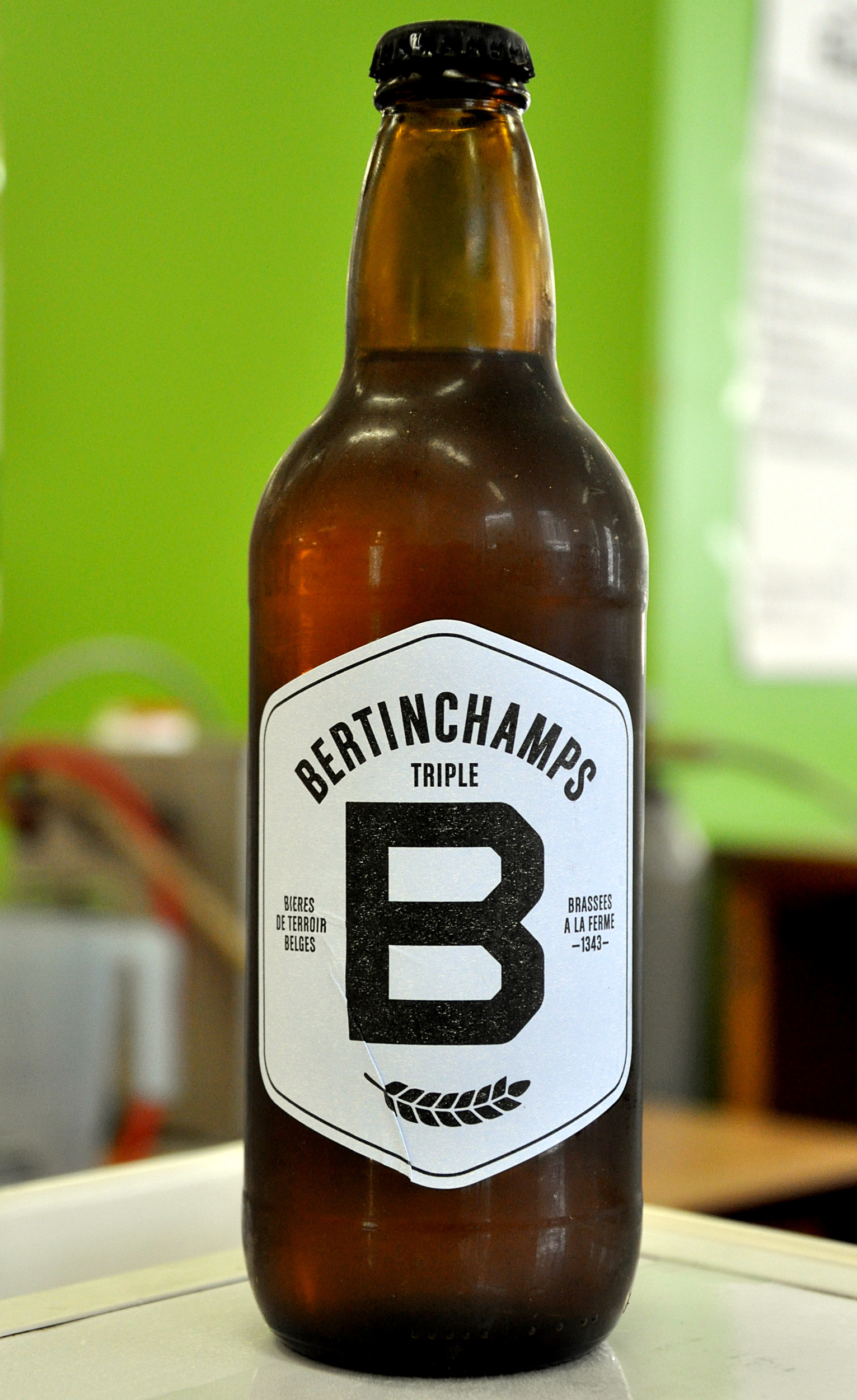
- Bertinchamps Triple
- Interactive map of Bertinchamps brewery
- Location: Gembloux, Belgium
- Coordinates: 50°33′27″N 4°38′30″E
- Opened: 2013
- Owner: Benoît Humblet
- Website: http://www.bertinchamps.be/

Active beers
Bertinchamps
Name	Type
Bertinchamps Blonde	blonde
Bertinchamps Triple	tripel
Bertinchamps Brune	brown

The Bertinchamps brewery, also known as brasserie de la Ferme de Bertinchamps, is a Belgian family-run microbrewery located in Gembloux, in the Belgian province of Namur. It brews three types of beer named Bertinchamps, which are a recognized part of Belgian beer culture. Its primary export markets are Russia, China, Japan, Ireland and France. In April 2017 it made the national news in Belgium for producing 3D-printed chocolate beer bottles.

== History ==
This family brewery started to brew beer in 2013. Two years before this, the Humblet family had bought the farm of Bertinchamps, a very old courtyard farm of the Namur part of the Hesbaye annexed to Gembloux in 1343. They wanted to renovate it and install the equipment necessary for an annual maximal beer production of 6,000 hl. The brewery has four fermentation tanks of a 60 hl to 120 hl capacity. Benoît Humblet, who used to work at the Val-Dieu brewery, is the master brewer. The label of the beer simply shows a big B (as in Bertinchamps, Belgium, Beer or even Benoît).

== Beers ==
The beers brewed in this brewery are protected by the label Belgian Beer of Wallonia. This protection is granted by the Agence wallonne pour la promotion d'une agriculture de qualité (APAQ-W) - the Wallonian agency for the promotion of quality agriculture. The brewery produces three beers sold in bottles that have the unusual capacity of 50 cl. Those are old-style farm beers, pure malt and hops, without spices or additives:

- the Bertinchamps Blonde, a 6.2% abv blonde beer.
- the Bertinchamps Triple, an 8% abv triple beer.
- the Bertinchamps Brune, a 7% abv brown beer.

The Bertinchamps brewery is also a contract brewery.

In 2017 the Bertinchamps brewery was in the news for having commissioned the 3D printing of a chocolate beer bottle.

== See also ==
- Beer in Belgium
- List of Belgian beers
