= René Tavernier (geologist) =

Belgian geologist and stratigrapher

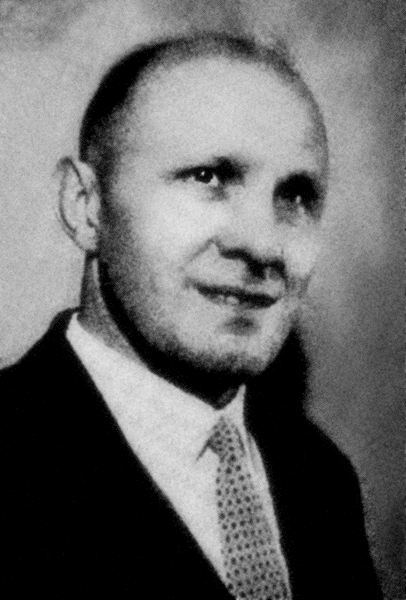
René Tavernier

René Tavernier (26 August 1914, Nevele – 19 November 1992, Ghent) was a Belgian geologist and stratigrapher. He was a professor at the State University of Ghent, a corresponding member of the Royal Flemish Academy of Belgium for Science and the Arts, and one of the founders of the Belgian Society for Soil Science.

He was involved in the preparation of a soil taxonomy and in the realisation of the soil maps of Belgium and of the European Community. He founded the Internationaal Bodemkundig Centrum (International Soil Center) at the State University of Ghent in order to help students from developing countries and managed to demonstrate the importance of geological knowledge for major agricultural development projects.

== Biography ==
René Tavernier was born on 26 August 1914 in Nevele, the son of a veterinary surgeon. After attending the Sint-Lievenscollege in Ghent, he completed courses in geology and mineralogy at the State University of Ghent. His academic career started in 1937 with his appointment as an assistant in the Laboratory of Geology at the State University of Ghent. After his PhD, he became a substitute teacher for the Physical Geography course. In 1943 he became a foreman and one year later professor at the Laboratory of Physical Geography, where he was appointed professor ordinarius in 1948. In the beginning of his career his teaching was limited to Physical Geography, but was expanded to Geology in 1952. From 1955 onwards he was charged with the teaching of purely geological subjects. From 1943 until 1950 he was responsible for the supply of drinking water for the allied troops and of cooling water for the heavy anti-aircraft defence at the Belgian Geological Service.

On 8 October 1955, Tavernier became a corresponding member of the Royal Flemish Academy of Belgium for Science and the Arts. He became an active member on 20 September 1958 and administrator in 1967. Aside from that, he was a member of the Royal Academy for Overseas Sciences and of the International Union of Soil Sciences (IUSS). He was president of the IUSS from 1950 to 1954 and in 1986 he was made an honorary member. Tavernier was one of the founders of the Belgian Society for Soil Science and served as Secretary-General from 1950 until 1958. He was also a member of the Royal Dutch Geographical Society, the American Society of Economic Paleontologists and Mineralogists, the Royal Swedish Academy of Agriculture and Forestry and corresponding member of the Académie d'Agriculture de France. Moreover, he received the honorary title of Commander in the Order of Merit of the Grand Duchy of Luxembourg.

== Work ==
In 1935 René Tavernier received the Mac Leod Prize, named after Julius Mac Leod, professor at the State University of Ghent, for his licentiate thesis. His doctoral research was awarded the Baron van Ertborn Prize in 1948. Both papers were studies on Neogene sediments in Belgium. The Neogene sands were studied according to the level of heavy minerals they contained. In this way, René Tavernier was able to distinguish between the marine and continental sands of Low Belgium and to determine the region of provenance of these sands.

His geological interest was related to the sedimentology of the Cenozoic formations of the North Sea Basin, the Quaternary in Belgium, the fossil periglacial structures, the evolution of the basin of the Scheldt during the Quaternary and of the coastal plain during the Holocene, the fluctuation of the sea level, etc. Under the impetus of Professor Victor Van Straelen the Comité voor de Opname van de Bodem- en Vegetatiekaart van België (Committee for the Recording of the Soil and Vegetation Map of Belgium) was founded in 1946. The project, which started in 1947, was funded by the Instituut tot Aanmoediging van het Wetenschappelijk Onderzoek in Nijverheid en Landbouw (IWONL) (Institute for the Promotion of Scientific Research into Industry and Agriculture). In order to realize the soil map, three different centers collaborated in the recording of data: Leuven, Gembloux and Ghent. Being the person responsible for the center in Ghent, René Tavernier saw the need for coordination from the start. He aspired to build one national center. From 1950 onwards, René Tavernier was the director of the Center of Soil Cartography – Centrum voor Bodemkartering (C.V.B.) with the main task of recording the soil maps, creating a national legend, and coordinating the activities at national level. This work was awarded the decennial prize for Geological Sciences in 1968. The C.V.B. remained active until its dissolution in 1976.

René Tavernier took part in the organization of the 4th Congress of the International Soil Science Society in Amsterdam in 1950, where he was elected President of ISSS. Following the 5th ISSS congress, which took place in 1954 in Léopoldville (Kinshasa), he worked on a classification system for tropical soils, in collaboration with the National Institute of Agricultural Studies in the Belgian Congo (INEAC-NILCO). From 1951 René Tavernier also worked with the USDA Soil Conservation Service in the preparation of a soil taxonomy, especially with its Director of Soil Survey Investigations, Guy D. Smith.

Between 1952 and 1958 he was a member of the Geological Council and was charged with the preparation of the stratigraphic scale of the Quaternary. In 1957, Jean de Heinzelin de Braucourt and René Tavernier gave the Holocene epoch the name of Flandrien, based on the transgression sediments in Flanders. The term Flandrien is now completely obsolete, even as a synonym.

In 1958, René Tavernier was a member of the executive committee of the National Institute of Agricultural Studies in the Belgian Congo (INEAC-NILCO). In 1960 he founded the International Soil Science Center at the State University of Ghent. This center, aiming to serve the third world, started in 1963 with postgraduate courses. He managed to show the importance of geological knowledge in major agricultural development projects. Within the European Community he was asked in 1980 to create a soil map at a scale of 1:1,000,000. This work was completed in 1985.

== Publications ==
A list of Tavernier's publications, books and articles, can be found in Liber memorialis Rijksuniversiteit te Gent, 1960, pp. 231–234. A non-exhaustive list of the publications which have been collected by the Ghent University Library can be consulted on the UGent Digital catalogue.

== Bibliography ==
- GABRIELS, Donald, "In memoriam René J. Tavernier", in: IUSS Bulletin, 1992–1993, 82–83, p. 91-92.
- (in Dutch) GROESSENS, Éric & GROESSENS-VAN DYCK, Marie-Claire "De Aardwetenschappen", in; HALLEUX, Robert & al. (red.), Histoire des sciences en Belgique, 1815–2000, vol 2, Bruxelles: Dexia/La Renaissance du Livre, 2001, p. 219-233.
- (in Dutch) GEUKENS, Fernand, "In Memoriam René Tavernier", in: Jaarboek 1993–1996, Bruxelles, KVAB, p. 99-100.
- (in Dutch) "Tavernier René", in: De Koninklijke Vlaamse Academie van België voor wetenschappen en kunsten en haar leden, Bruxelles: Koninklijke Vlaamse Academie van België voor wetenschappen en kunsten, 2010, p. 251-252.
- (in Dutch) LUYKX, Theo (red.), "René Tavernier", in: Liber memorialis Rijksuniversiteit te Gent, 1960, 229–234.
