= Konstantin Gedroits =

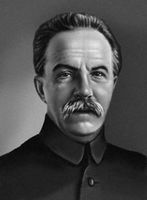
- Born: 25 March 1872; Bender, Moldova
- Died: 5 October 1932 (aged 60); Moscow, Soviet Union
- Education: Saint Petersburg Imperial University
- Awards: Lenin Prize (1927)

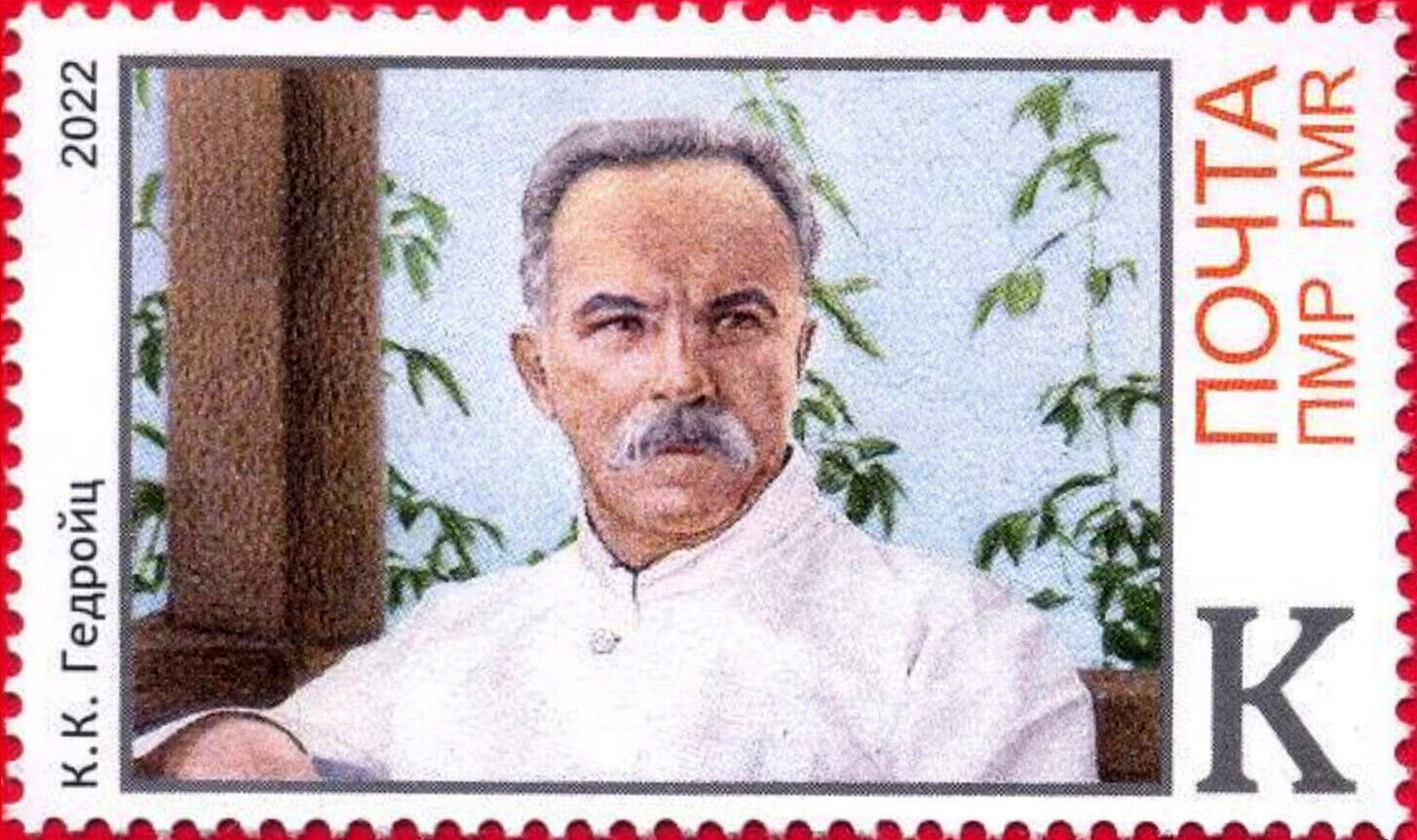
Gedroits on a 2022 stamp of Transnistria

Konstantin Kaetanovich Gedroits (Russian: Константин Каэтанович Гедройц; 25 March 1872 – 5 October 1932) was a Russian soil scientist of Lithuanian origins. He was a full member of the Academy of Sciences of the Soviet Union and a president of the International Union of Soil Sciences (1927–1930).

== Biography ==
Gedroits belonged to the Lithuanian aristocratic Giedroyć family. He was born in Bessarabia, which was then part of the Russian Empire. He studied in Saint Petersburg, where he graduated from the Forest Institute in 1897 and from the Saint Petersburg Imperial University in 1903. After that he led the chemistry laboratory of the Dokuchaev Soil Institute in Moscow (1915–17) and the Department of Soil Science of the Forest Institute in Saint Petersburg (1917–30). In 1929–30 he headed the Dokuchaev Soil Institute, and in 1927 was elected as president of the International Union of Soil Sciences. In 1929, he became a full member if the Academy of Sciences of the Soviet Union and in 1930, a full member of the National Academy of Sciences of Ukraine.

Gedroits was the founder of colloidal soil chemistry in Russia. He introduced the concept of "soil absorbing complex" and singled out several types of soil absorption capacity, including mechanical, physico-chemical and biological. He also developed a classification of soils based on the difference in the composition, which included soils unsaturated with cations, soils saturated with calcium and sodium ions, etc. He explained the evolution of saline soils from the chemical point of view, and developed a theoretical basics of liming and of the introduction of gypsum into the soil.

== Awards and legacy ==
For his achievement in soil science, Gedroits was awarded the Lenin Prize in 1927. In 2002, the Central Bank of Transnistria minted a silver coin honoring this native of today's Transnistria, as part of a series of memorable coins called The Outstanding People of Pridnestrovie.
