= Westmalle Brewery =

Belgian Trappist brewery

Coordinates: 51°17′08″N 4°39′28″E

- Industry: Trappist brewery
- Founded: 1836
- Headquarters: Westmalle, Belgium
- Products: Beer, cheese
- Production output: 120,000 hl (2004)
- Owner: Trappist Abbey of Westmalle
- Number of employees: 22 monks, 40 secular workers

Westmalle Brewery (Brouwerij der Trappisten van Westmalle) is a Trappist brewery in the Westmalle Abbey, Belgium. It produces three beers, designated as Trappist beer by the International Trappist Association. Westmalle Tripel is credited with being the first golden strong pale ale to use the term Tripel.

== History ==
The Trappist abbey in Westmalle (officially called Abdij Onze-Lieve-Vrouw van het Heilig Hart van Jezus) was founded 6 June 1794, but the community was not elevated to the rank of Trappist abbey until 22 April 1836. Martinus Dom, the first abbot, decided the abbey would brew its own beer, and the first beer was brewed on 1 August 1836 and first imbibed on 10 December 1836. The pioneer brewers were Father Bonaventura Hermans and Albericus Kemps. The first beer was described as light in alcohol and rather sweet. By 1856, the monks had added a second beer: the first strong brown beer. This brown beer is today considered the first dubbel (Dutch for 'double'). The current Dubbel is derived from a recipe first brewed in 1926. Local sales began in 1856 and the oldest registered sale was on 1 January 1861. The brewery was enlarged and rebuilt in 1865 based on the example set by the Trappists of Forges (nearby Chimay). Father Ignatius van Ham joined the brewer team. Further commercialisation and sales to traders commenced in 1921. In 1933 a complete new brewery was built and in 1934, the brewery brewed a strong pale ale of 9.5% abv giving it the name Tripel - the first modern use of the name. The brewery was remodeled in 1991. It currently has a bottling capacity of 45,000 bottles per hour, and yearly output of 120,000 hl (in 2004).

The majority of the workers in the brewery are no longer monks, but secular staff brought in from outside. There are 22 monks and 40 outside staff.

== Products ==
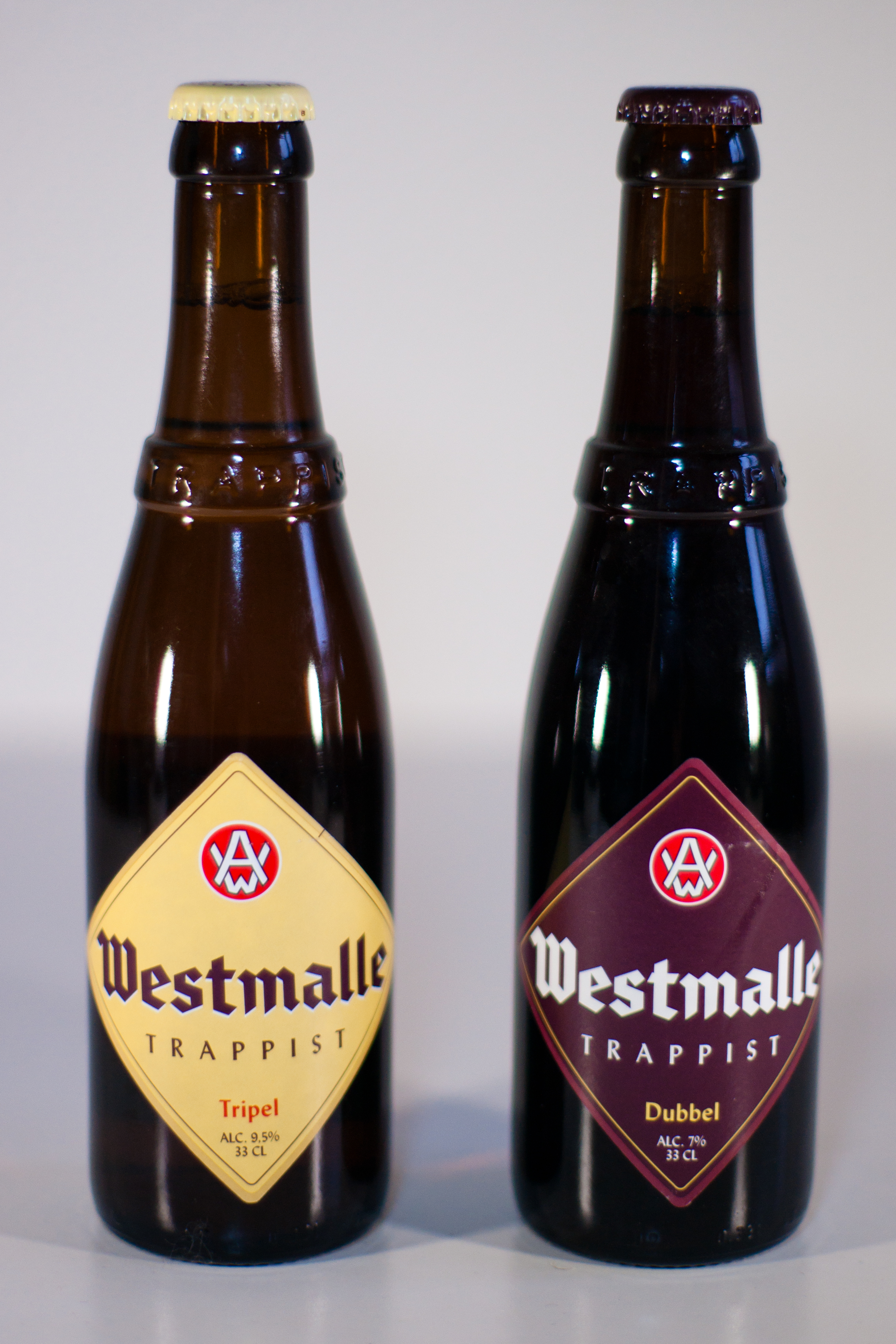
Westmalle - The 2 beers: Tripel and Dubbel

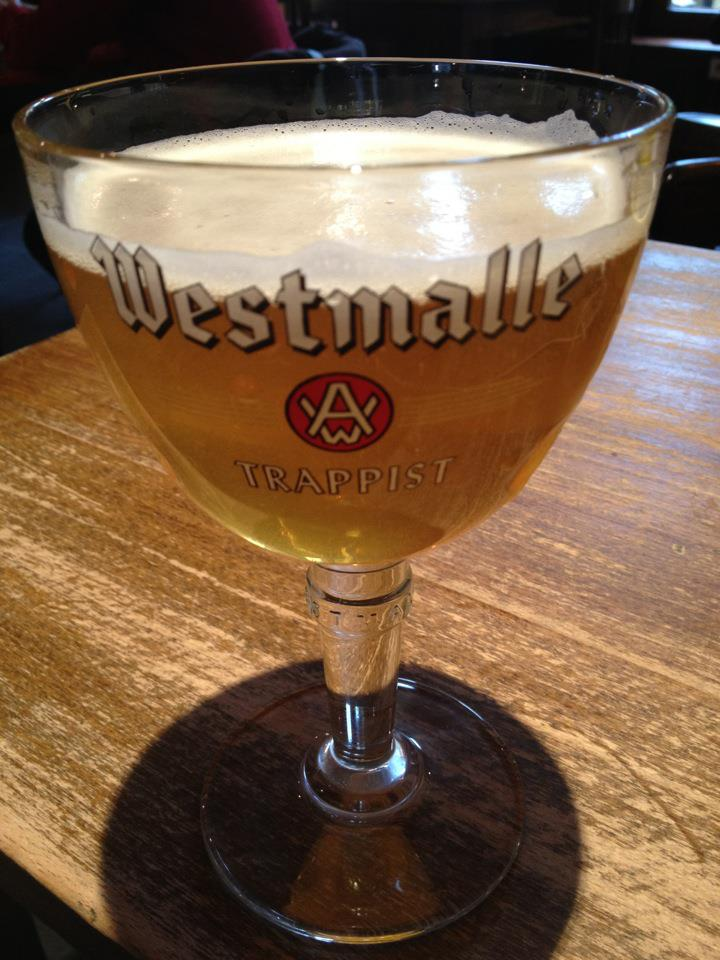
Westmalle Trappist Beer glass

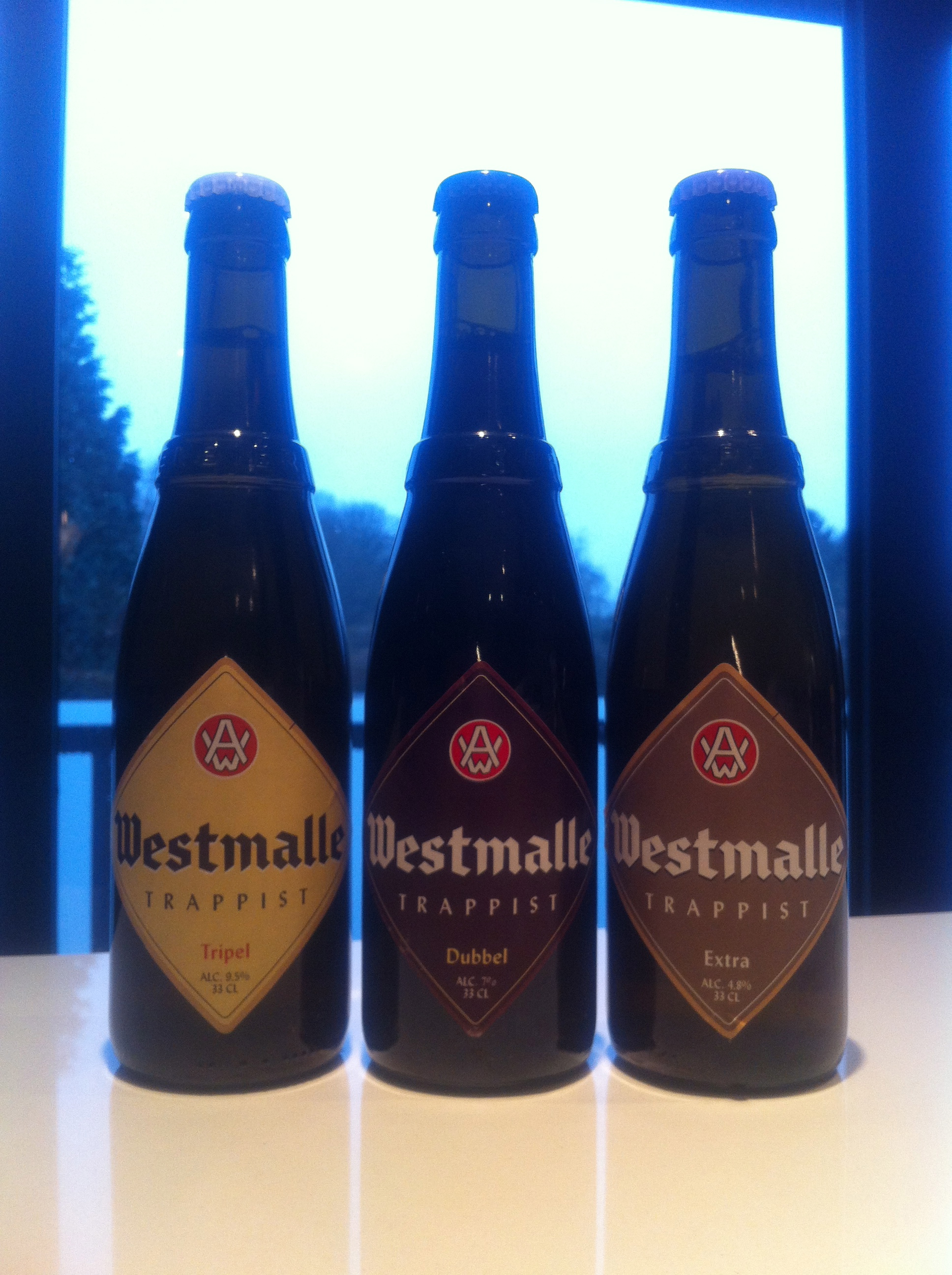
Westmalle Trappists

The brewery regularly produces three beers, and occasionally produces additional limited release beers.

Westmalle Dubbel has a purple label and is a 7% abv Dubbel.

Westmalle Tripel has a yellow label and is a 9.5% abv tripel, was first brewed in 1934 and the recipe has not changed since 1956. It is made with pale candy sugar and has a very pale colour produced from a mash of light pilsener malts. Styrian Goldings hops are used along with some German varieties and the classic Saaz pilsener hop. After a long secondary fermentation the Tripel is bottled with a dose of sugar and yeast.

Westmalle Extra has a blue label and is a 5% abv beer with limited availability, i.e. a patersbier. It is the beer drunk by the monks during the working day. It has been speculated that Westmalle's initial choice of three types of beers was based on the Holy Trinity.

Since March 2025 a blend of Tripel (60%) and Extra (40%) was brewed in a limited (for now) edition of approximately 5,000 barrels. The Duo has an alcohol percentage of 7.2%. It is only distributed to a few select cafés.

The abbey also produces milk and cheese.

== Bibliography ==
- Jan B. Van Damme o.c.r., Cistercienzers of Trappisten te Westmalle, Westmalle, 1974
- Jan B. Van Damme o.c.r., Geschiedenis van de Trappistenabdij te Westmalle (1794–1956), Westmalle, 1977
- J. Van Remoortere, Ippa's Abdijengids voor Belgie, Lanno, 1990
