= Westmalle =

- Village
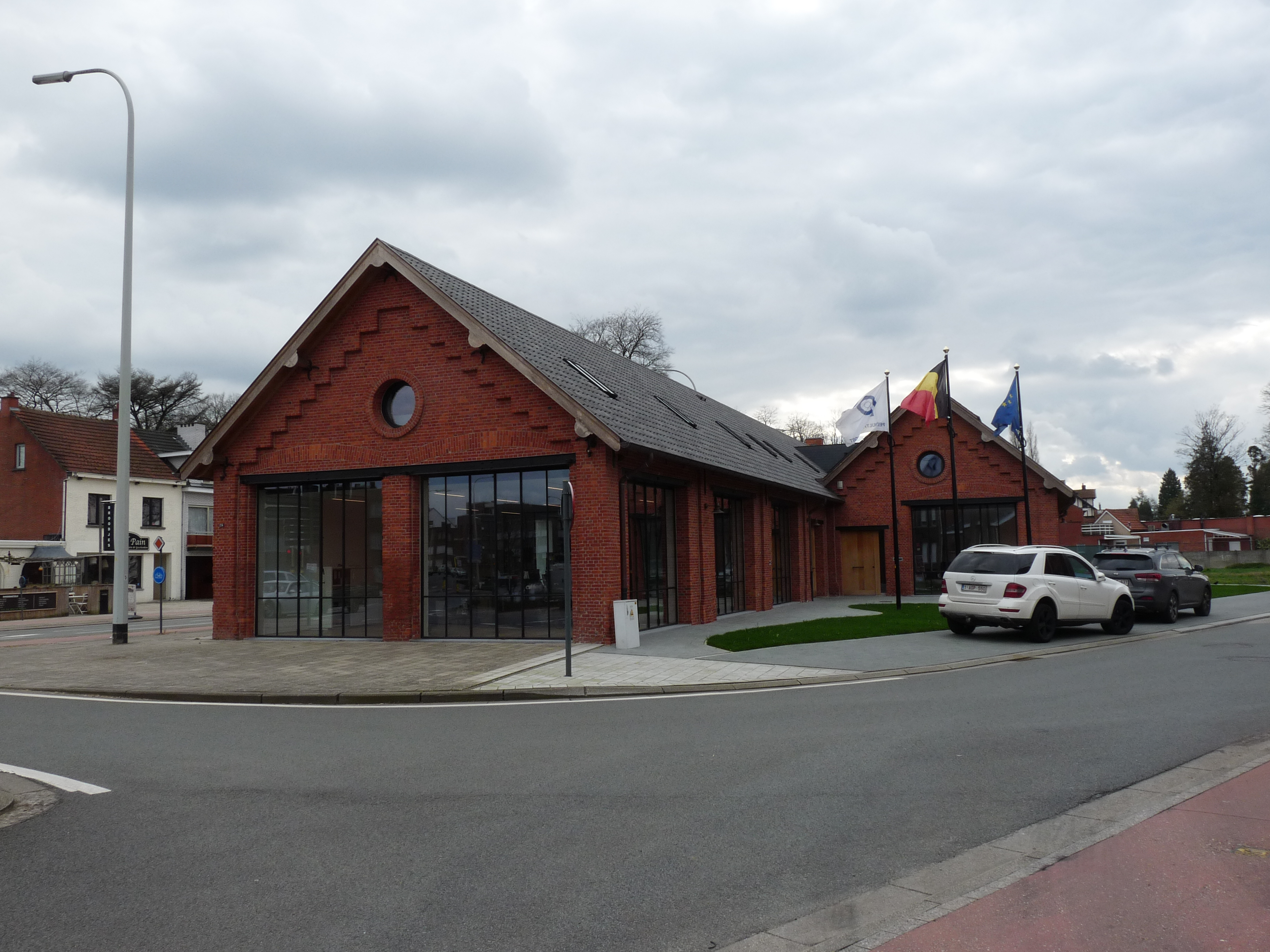
- Former railway station

- Location in Belgium
- Coordinates: 51°17′N 4°41′E
- Country: Belgium
- Region: Flemish Region
- Province: Antwerp
- Municipality: Malle

Area
  - Total: 23.26 km^{2} (8.98 sq mi)
  - Land: 23.26 km^{2} (8.981 sq mi)

Population (2021)
  - Total: 8,229
  - Density: 353.8/km^{2} (916.3/sq mi)
- Time zone: CET

Westmalle is a village in the Belgian province of Antwerp which is part of the municipality of Malle.

== Tourism ==
Westmalle is primarily known for the Trappist Abbey of Westmalle of the Order of Cistercians of the Strict Observance (O.C.S.O.: Ordo Cisterciensium reformatorum), and its brewery. The Trappist monks operate a brewery and also make cheese. In addition, the Monasterium Magnificat of Westmalle is the only monastery of the Annunciade Order in Belgium. Westmalle Castle dates back to 1100. The Scherpenberg windmill is still operational and is open to visitors.

The statue of the "Pedaalstompers" commemorates the world record of the longest bicycle.

== Notable inhabitants ==
- Martinus Dom (1791-1873), first abbot of the Trappist Abbey of Westmalle and founder of the brewery.
- Paul Lewi (b. 4 January 1938 in Westmalle), scientist.
- Francis Severeyns, nicknamed Cisse (b. 1968 in Westmalle), football striker
- Seppe Smits (b. 13 July 1991 in Westmalle), professional snowboarder

== Gallery ==
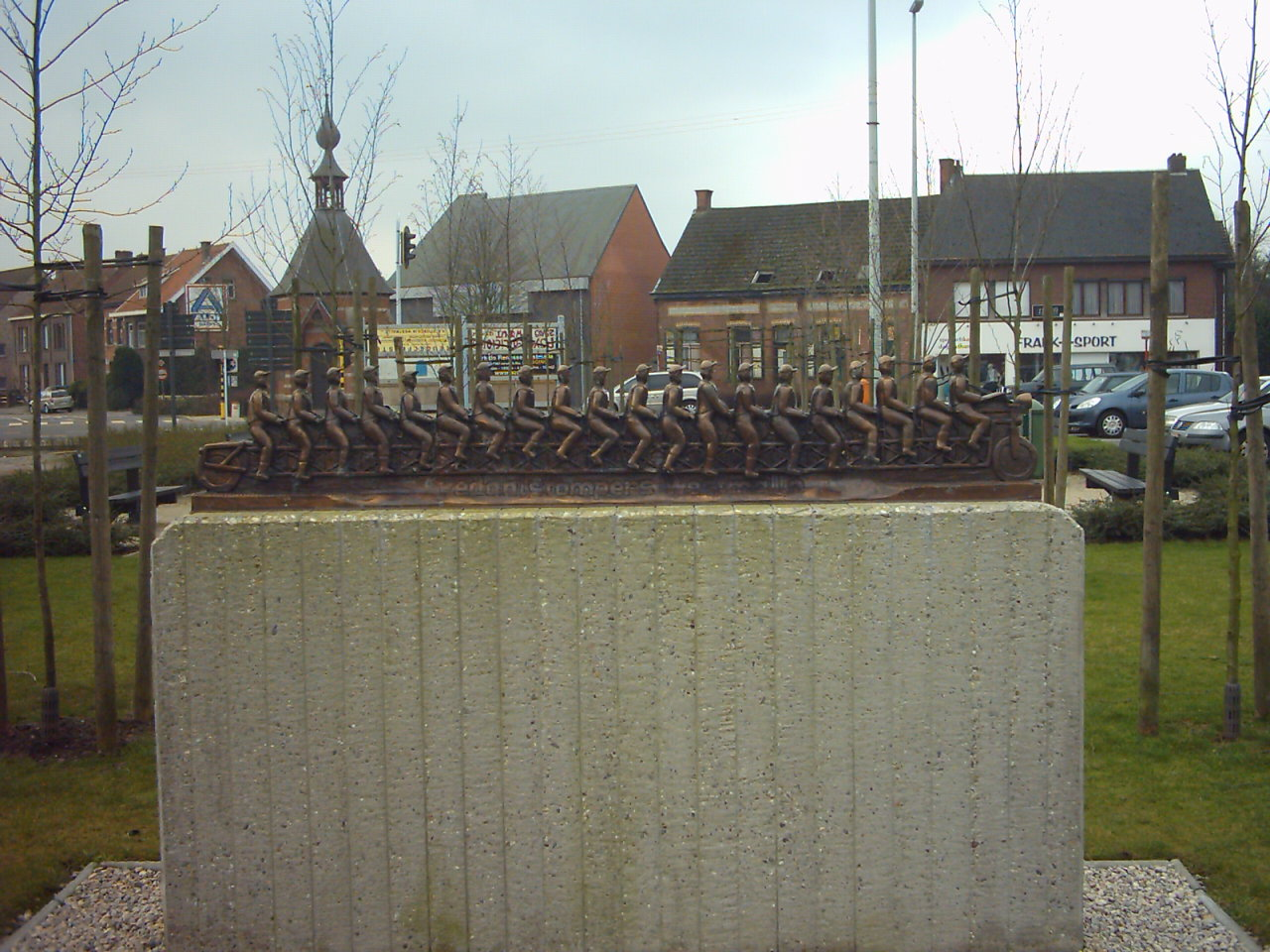
Pedaalstompers World Record of longest bicycle

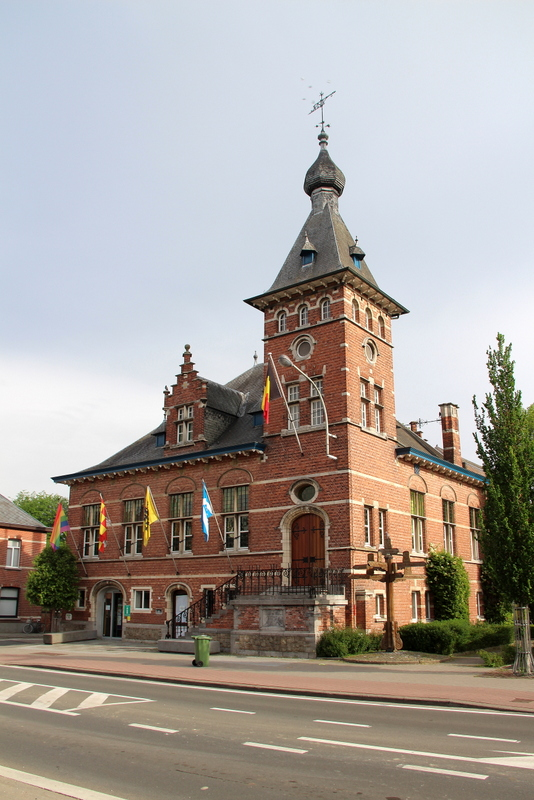
Former town hall

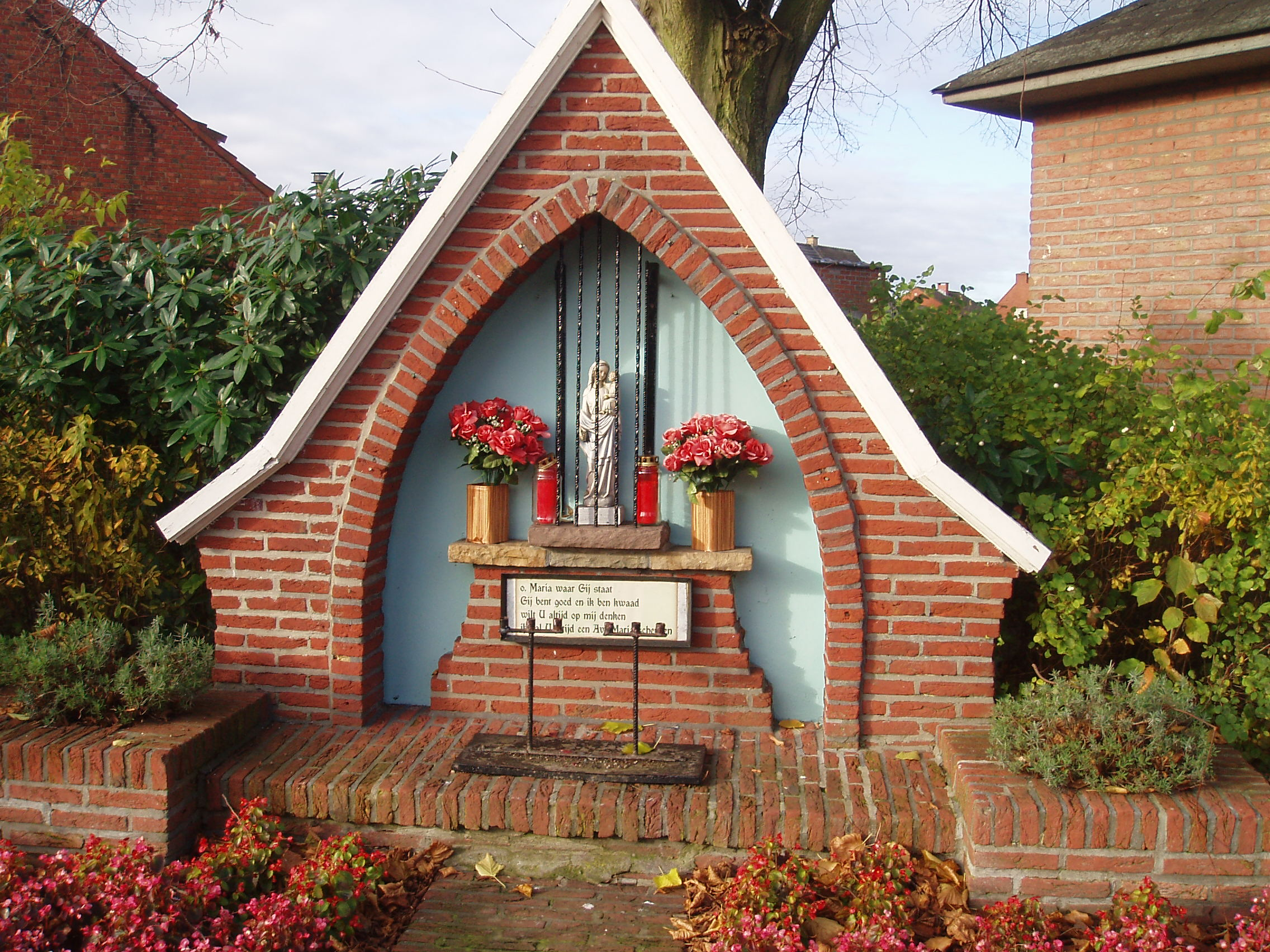
Chapel in Westmalle

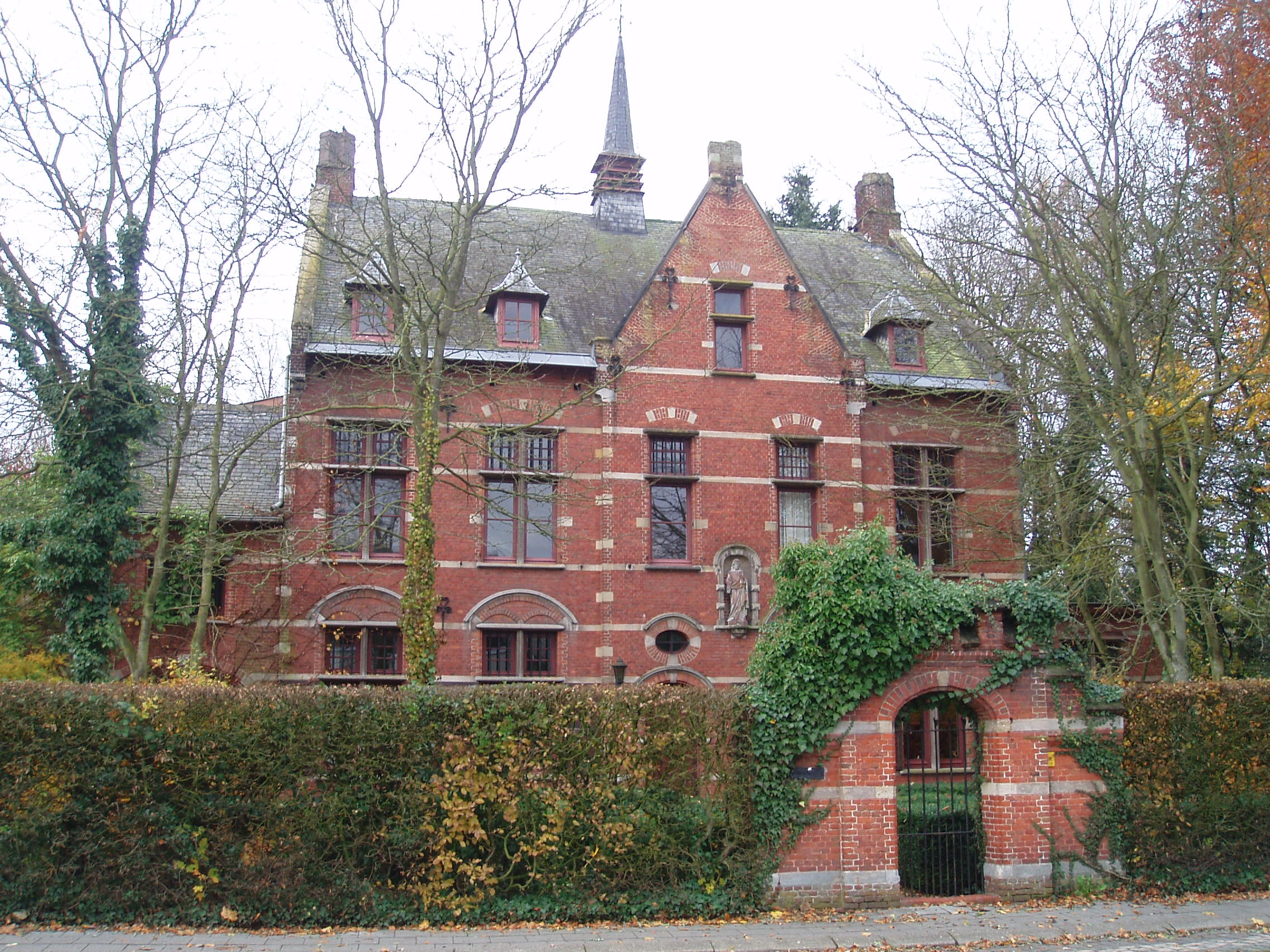
Villa Wildzang

== See also ==
- Trappist beer
- Oostmalle
