= Monasterium Magnificat =

Monastery in Westmalle, Belgium

Coordinates: 51°17′18″N 4°39′48″E

The Monasterium Magnificat is a monastery of the Annunciade Order, located in Westmalle, Belgium. It is the only monastery of this order in Belgium. It was created from the merger of three monasteries which existed in 1965: Tienen (1629), Geel (1853), and Merksem (1898). The new monastery was built between 1966 and 1970 in the midst of a quiet forest belonging to Westmalle Abbey. Marc Dessauvage (1931-1984) was the architect of the building.

== See also ==
- Saint Joan of France

== Sources ==
- Monastérium Magnificat
- Annuntiaten
