= Dubbel =

Type of beer

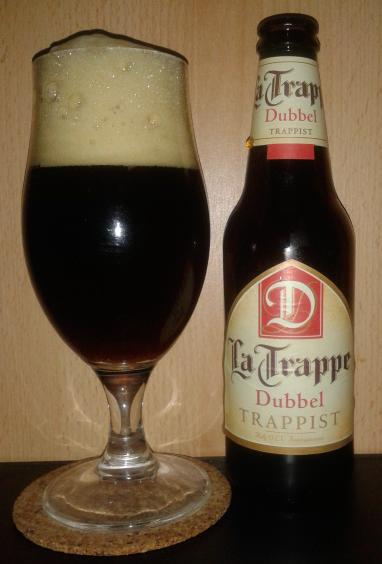
La Trappe Dubbel (.30 liter bottle + unrelated glass)

The term dubbel (also double) is a Belgian Trappist beer naming convention. The origin of the dubbel was a strong version of a brown beer brewed in Westmalle Abbey in 1856, which is known to have been on sale to the public by June 1861. In 1926, the recipe was changed by brewer Henrik Verlinden, and it was sold as Dubbel Bruin.

Following World War II, abbey beers became popular in Belgium and the name "dubbel" was used by several breweries for commercial purposes.

Westmalle's Dubbel was imitated by other breweries around the world, both Trappist and secular, leading to the emergence of the style. Dubbels are now understood to be a fairly strong (6–8% alcohol by volume) brown ale, with understated bitterness, fairly heavy body, and a pronounced fruitiness and cereal character.

Chimay Première (Red), Koningshoeven/La Trappe Dubbel, and Achel 8 Bruin are notable examples from Trappist breweries. Affligem and Grimbergen are Belgian abbey breweries that produce dubbels.

Notable examples from the US include Ommegang's Dubbel and New Belgium's Abbey Ale.

Abbey 1856 Dubbel is produced in Argentina.

Unibroue's Maudite Dubbel is produced in Quebec.

== Flavor profile ==
Dubbels are characteristically known for being dark brown in colour with a strong flavor of dark fruit including raisins, prunes, and dates. These flavors and colors are almost entirely resultant from the heavy addition of candi sugar, highly caramelized (or kilned) beet sugar, which ferments completely into alcohol, lightening the body of the finished beer and contributing to its dry finish. The caramelization of the beet sugar is also the major contributor of maillard flavors including chocolatey, caramel, and nutty tones that give the dubbel its wide gamut of flavour complexity. Because of the special strains of ale yeast used in their production, dubbels often carry a mild spice; coriander and black pepper are notable examples in traditional Belgian dubbels. The yeast also generates fruity esters like banana, which provide a huge portion of the flavors of dubbels.

== See also ==
- Tripel
- Quadrupel
- Trappist beer
- Beer in Belgium
