= Martinus Dom =

The High Reverend Lord Martinus Dom, O.C.R.
- Abbas Westmalle
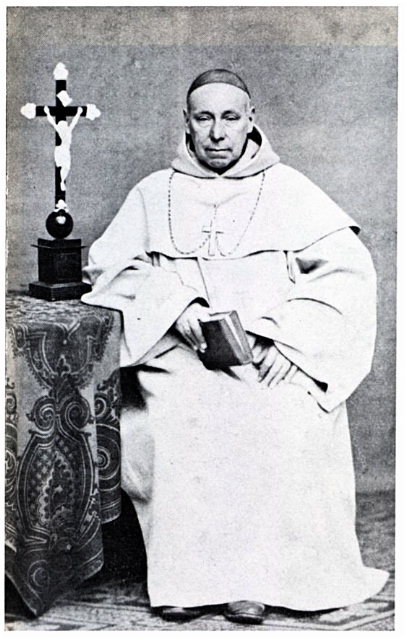
- Dom Martinus Dom, O.C.R.
- Church: Trappist Abbey of Westmalle
- Elected: 14 July 1836
- Term ended: 9 December 1873
- Other post: Prior of Westmalle Priory (1826-1836)

Orders
- Ordination: 23 December 1820

Personal details
- Born: Frans Daniël Dom Kontich, Flanders, Southern Netherlands, Habsburg monarchy
- Died: Westmalle Abbey, Westmalle, Antwerp, Belgium

Dom Martinus Dom, O.C.R., (24 December 1791 – 9 December 1873) was a Belgian Trappist monk. He served as the first abbot of the Trappist Abbey of Westmalle, where he founded the Westmalle Brewery.

== Early life ==
He was born Frans Daniël Dom in Kontich, Flanders, then part of the Southern Netherlands, to Jan Frans Dom, a cattle merchant, and Elisabeth Van Berckelaer. He was baptised on Christmas Day 1791, the day after his birth, in the local parish church, the Church of St. Martin of Tours.

As a young man Dom served as a fourrier in the Napoleonic Army. After the defeat of Napoleon in 1814, he returned home to everyday life. He became a notorious partygoer and became engaged to a young woman. But after some brawls at home with his father and with his life in turmoil, he decided to go on pilgrimage to the Church of Onze-Lieve-Vrouw van Goede Wil in Duffel to help him decide whether he should marry or enter the Trappist Monastery of Westmalle. The story goes that he let fate decide by throwing his hat up in the air. If it fell with the opening up he would go to Westmalle, but if it fell with the opening down he would ask for forgiveness and marry. The hat fell with the opening up and he went to enter the Trappists.

At first the monks followed Trappist practice and strongly disparaged Dom's application, but on 11 November 1817, feast day of St. Martin of Tours, patron saint of both his hometown and of the monastery, he was received into the monastery and given the name Martinus. In 1818, he professed his religious vows and on 23 December 1820 he was ordained as a priest. He became one of the teachers of the orphan boys who were educated in the abbey. In 1826, when the monastery was made a semi-autonomous conventual priory by its motherhouse, the Abbey of La Trappe, he was elected prior of the monastery (the first to be elected), which position he retained until 1836 when he was elected abbot.

== Abbot ==
In 1836 Westmalle Priory was raised to the status of an independent abbey by Pope Gregory XVI. On 14 July 1836, already prior of the monastery, Dom was elected as its first abbot of the abbey of Westmalle. When the priory obtained the status of an abbey, the strict rule that the monks could only drink water with their meal was relaxed. Cider or beer was then allowed to be drunk in the refectory of the abbey. Rather than buy beer from outside the abbey, Dom decided to brew their own beer. They started brewing on 1 August 1836, and on 10 December 1836 the monks tasted their own beer for the first time. Local sales began in 1856, and sales to traders commenced in 1921.

Dom died at Westmalle on 9 December 1873, where he had been prior for 47 years and abbot for 37 years.

== Sources ==
- Jan B. Van Damme o.c.r., Cistercienzers of Trappisten te Westmalle, Westmalle, 1974
- Jan B. Van Damme o.c.r., Geschiedenis van de Trappistenabdij te Westmalle (1794-1956), Westmalle, 1977
- J. Van Remoortere, Ippa's Abdijengids voor Belgie, Lanno, 1990
