= Albert Thys (painter) =

Painter

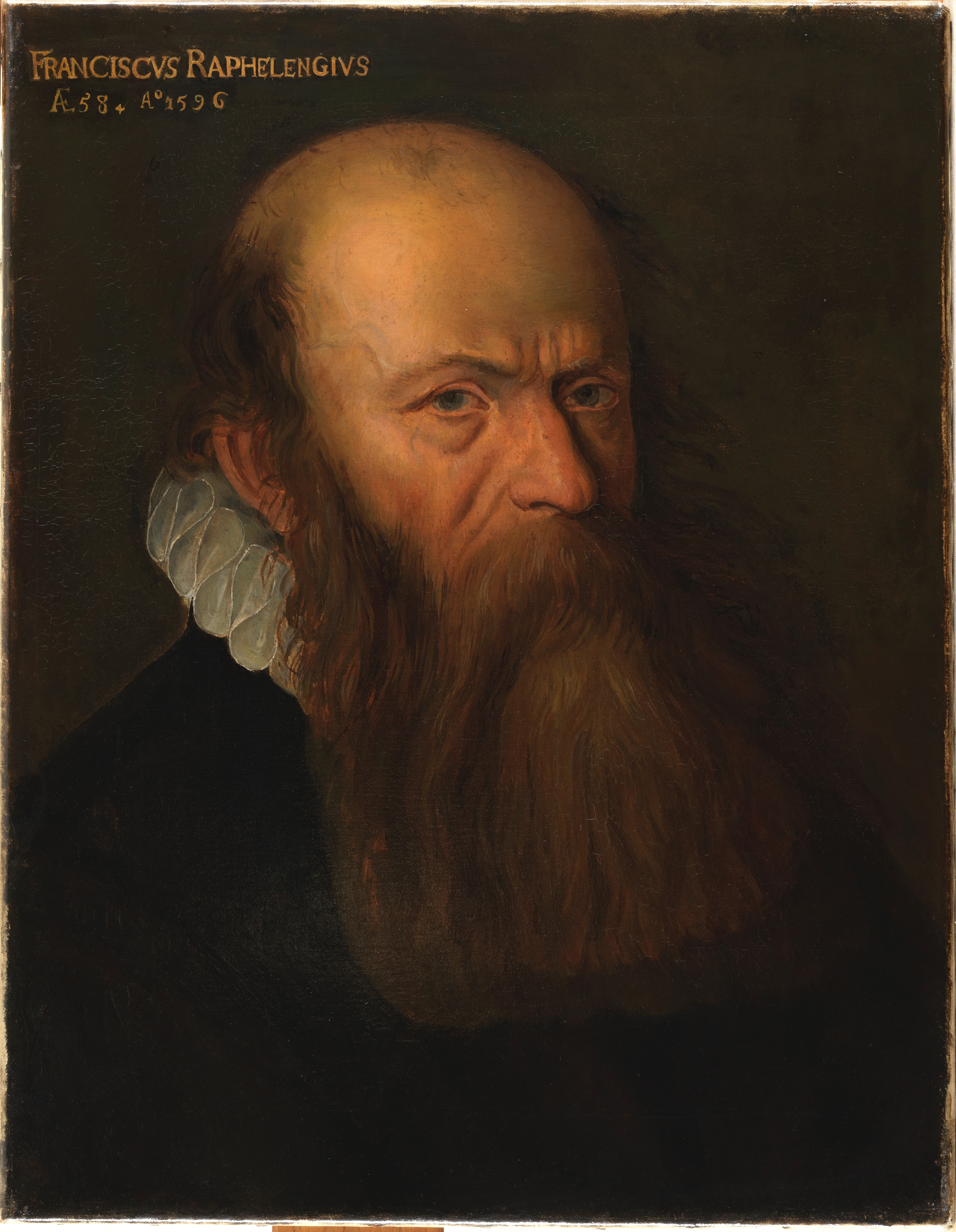
Portrait of Franciscus Raphelengius, Plantin-Moretus Museum, after the original in the Leiden University Library

Albert Thys (1894 – 1976) was a Belgian painter.

He was born on 18 March 1894 in Kontich, Antwerp, Belgium. He studied at the Academy of Fine Arts in Antwerp, where he was a student of Isidore Opsomer. He painted portraits and landscapes.
