= Westmalle Abbey =

Monastery in Antwerp

Coordinates: 51°17′05″N 4°39′24″E

Westmalle Abbey, otherwise the Trappist Abbey of Westmalle (Dutch: Abdij van Onze-Lieve-Vrouw van het Heilig Hart or the "Abbey of Our Lady of the Sacred Heart"), is a monastery of the Cistercians of Strict Observance in Westmalle in the Belgian province of Antwerp.

The community was founded in 1794 and elevated to an abbey on 22 April 1836. It is the home of the Westmalle Brewery, a Trappist beer brewery.

== History ==
=== 18th Century ===
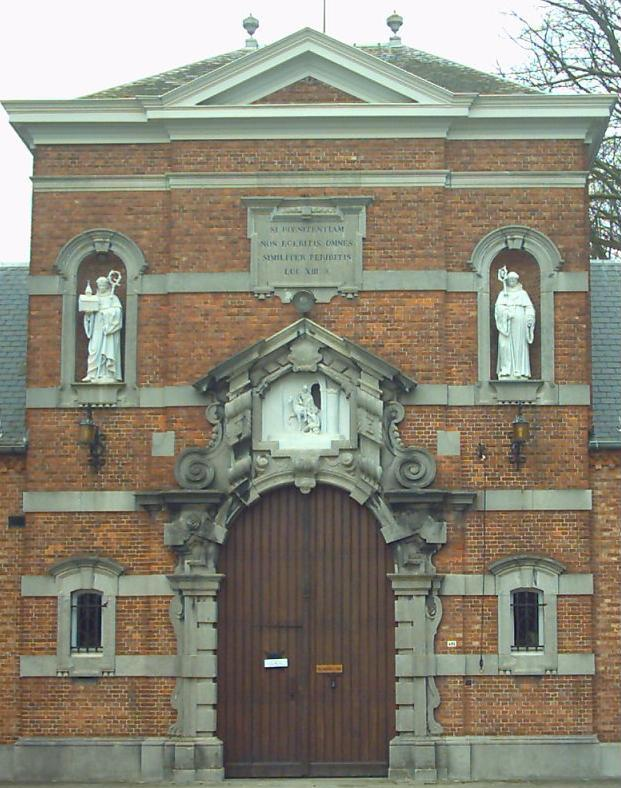
Entrance of the abbey

Twice in the 18th and 19th century the Cistercians (just like most other monastic orders) had been prohibited. In 1791 in the aftermath of the French Revolution, Augustinus de Lestrange Dubosc (1754–1827), the novice master of La Trappe Abbey (Soligny-la-Trappe) left France and went to Switzerland. He settled in the empty Carthusian monastery Val-Sainte (E: Sacred Valley) near Fribourg. As the senate of Fribourg put a numerus clausus of 21 monks and the refugees from France kept flowing in, Lestrange decided to send monks abroad to create new settlements, they left for Spain, Italy, and a third group to Canada. The group which was sent to Canada, would end up in Westmalle and laid the foundations of the present-day abbey. When the monks, on their way to Canada, passed through Flanders, the bishop of Antwerp, Cornelius Franciscus de Nelis, invited them to Antwerp. He wanted to ask Lestrange if they would be allowed to found a Trappist monastery in his bishopric instead of going to Canada. Lestrange allowed 8 of them to stay and to settle in Westmalle in the Campine region of Flanders.

The bishop of Antwerp gave them a small farm Nooit Rust (that is, "never rest") in which on 6 June 1794 a priory was founded. The farm dated from 1778 and was built by F.J. Charlé. He had purchased the land from the Saint-Bernard abbey of Bornem on 8 June 1773. The sale was a result of decree of Maria Theresa of Austria of 23 June 1772 to promote the cultivation of the Campine. With the support of banker Karel Jan Michiel De Wolff and other beneficiaries, such as the Saint-Bernard abbey of Bornem, bishop Neefs, Vyncke of Wuustwezel, Legrelle and count Bois d'Outrement, the farm was purchased on 3 June 1794 from the widow of Charlé, Elisabeth de Roode.

Two novices had joined the original group of eight, so they were now 10 founders: Arsenius Durand (first prior), Eugenius Bonhomme de la Prade, Joannes-M. De Bruyne, Joseph X (surname unknown), Bonavetura X (surname unknown), Sebastianus Dumont, Hippolytus Moriceau, Zozymus Florentin, Stefanus Malmy and Maria-Bernardus Benoit. However already on 17 July 1794, the monks had to leave Westmalle again, when the French troops invaded the Austrian Netherlands. They fled to Münster (Westphalia, Germany), and founded a monastery in Darfeld.

=== 19th Century ===
In February 1802, 12 monks returned to Westmalle, and with the support of the Antwerp banker Karel Jan Michiel De Wolff and other beneficiaries, the priory started to grow. However, on 28 July 1811 a decree by Napoleon I of France closed all Trappist monasteries in France. On 21 August 1814, after the defeat of Napoleon, the monks finally returned to Westmalle. During the United Kingdom of the Netherlands, the priory narrowly escaped closure due to the support of Leonard Pierre Joseph du Bus de Gisignies and on 25 January 1822, the priory was granted legal status by personnification civile by King William I. In 1830 a guesthouse was built, with the support of G. De Boey and other beneficiaries. In 1833 Archbishop Engelbert Sterckx granted the abbey the right to print the books of the Trappist order.

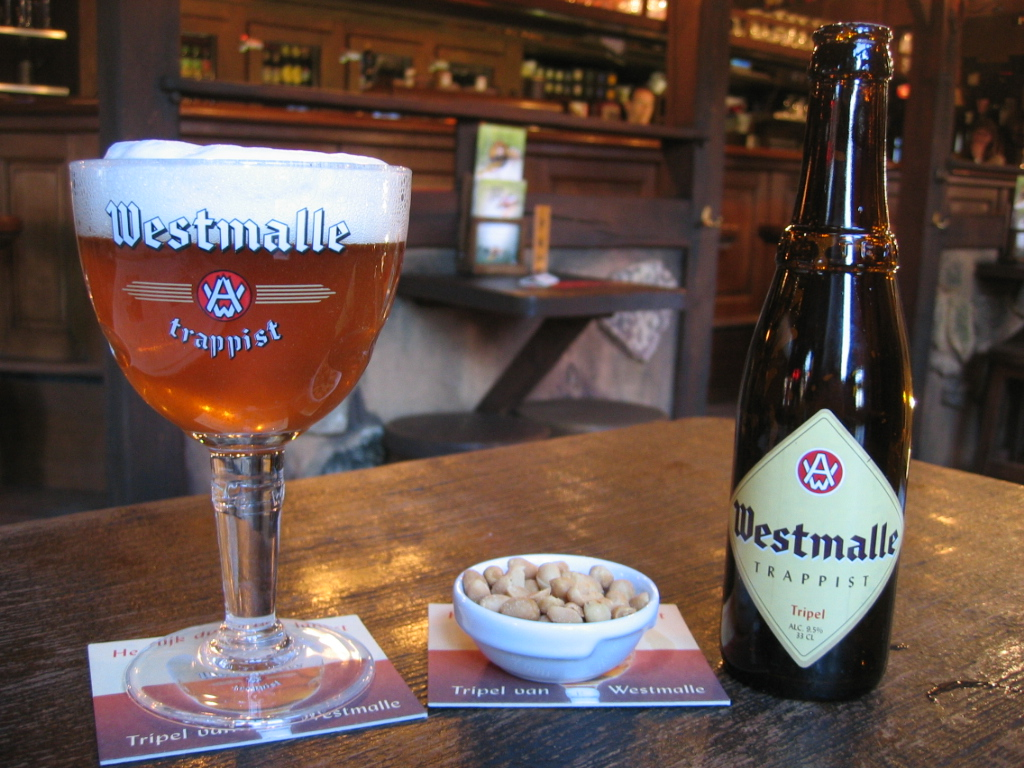
Westmalle beer

In 1834 negotiations started to obtain papal approval of the regulations in order to promote the priory to an abbey. It took until 22 April 1836 before the monastery became a Trappist abbey by a decree of Pope Gregory XVI and Archbishop Engelbert Sterckx. The regulations of abbot Armand Jean le Bouthillier de Rancé (1677) were ordained to be the rule in the Abbey of Westmalle. The regulations of de Rancé say that the monks are allowed to drink the popular local beverage with their meals (besides water), which in Flanders is beer. In order not to have to buy beer, they decided to brew it themselves. In 1836 the abbot Martinus Dom starts with the construction of a small brewery, and on 10 December 1836 they served their first brew of Trappist beer at lunch.

On 5 December 1842 the abbot and the community finally became the legal owners of the abbey. During the 19th Century the Abbey of Westmalle founded several other monasteries, such as Achel Abbey on 21 March 1846 (first founded in Meersel-Dreef on 3 May 1838 in a former monastery of the Order of Friars Minor Capuchin) and provided support for the Saint Sixtus abbey (Westvleteren). In 1840 a vineyard was created and a new entry gate was built. On 3 June 1884, Ulingsheide Abbey was founded in Tegelen, very close to the Dutch border with Germany, to receive German novices in the wake of the Kulturkampf. This community was dissolved in 2002, and as of summer 2020 negotiations were ongoing for the sale of the property to developers. On 6 April 1894, Westmalle founded the abbey of Saint Joseph in Belgian Congo. Father Jozef Peeters, together with 4 brothers left for Congo and they first settled in N'Dembe in Kasai but after a few years they relocated to Bamania near Mbandaka (then Coquilhatville). The abbey in Congo was in 1925 handed over to the Brothers of the Sacred Heart of the Sacred Heart of Issoundun (Borgerhout).

In Westmalle from 1885 onwards, several new buildings were built, such as a new church and a guesthouse between 1885 and 1887. Between 1895 and 1908, the abbey was expanded and in 1895 a tramway was extended up to within the abbey for transport. In 1897, a second brewery was built and in 1898 the fourth and last wing of the abbey was completed, now consisting of a library, refectory, dormitory and the wing for the novices.

=== 20th Century ===
In 1914 at the onset of World War I, the church tower was demolished by the retreating Belgian army, it was rebuilt in 1924 with a campanile. During the war 10 monks, led by father Isidorus Verelst, stayed in the abbey. The others lived in exile in monasteries in Zundert, Echt and Tegelen in the (neutral) Netherlands. In 1930 a cowshed was built and in 1934 a new brewery was built. The abbey kept blister head cows for their milk and the production of Trappist cheese. During World War II, the abbey was spared and after the war the library was enlarged and the church modernized. Between 1946 and 1954 the monks of the abbey helped with the building of the Abbey of Our Lady of Nazareth in nearby Brecht. The rebuilding of Westmalle Abbey was finished in 1964. On 26 June 1972 it was decided that the Saint-Sixtus Abbey of Westvleteren would replace Cîteaux as the mother-abbey of Westmalle and the abbot of Saint Sixtus became the supervisor of Westmalle.

=== 21st Century ===
Up to today the Trappist abbey of Westmalle remains a remarkable element in the village of Westmalle (Malle) and continues its activities as a monastery and a brewery. In 2004 abbot Ivo Dujardin resigned and was succeeded by father Philip Nathanaël Koninkx.

The abbey has a rich an old patrimony containing old master paintings and valuable manuscripts by important artists Frans Francken the Elder, Albrecht Dürer, Jacob van Baelen, Constantin Meunier, Willem Vorsterman, Louis Grosse, Maerten de Vos, Jan Erasmus Quellinus, and others.

== Priors and Abbots ==
=== Priors ===
The first four priors were appointed by the founder of the priory, abbot Augustinus (Louis Henri) de Lestrange Dubosc of Val-Sainte. Martinus Dom was the first prior elected in 1826 by the monks of the priory itself.

- 6 June 1794 - March 1795: Arsenius (Pierre Bertrand) Durand (Châtellerault 1761 - Lulworth 1804)
- March 1795 - 16 October 1795: Eugenius Bonhomme de la Prade (Carcassonne 1764 - Verlaine 1816)
  - All monasteries in France were closed from 1795 until the Concordat of 1801 between Napoleon and Pope Pius VII.
- 1802 - August 1810: Maurus (Joseph) Mori (Ghent 1768 - Melleray 1842)
- 1810 - 1826: Alexius (Alex) Van Kerckhove (Lokeren 1767 - Westmalle 1826)
- 1826 - 1836: Martinus (Frans Daniel) Dom (Kontich 1791 - Westmalle 1873)

=== Abbots ===
In 1836, Martinus Dom was elected the first abbot of the abbey after it was elevated to the status of abbey instead of a priory.

- 1836 - 1873: Martinus (Frans Daniel) Dom (Kontich 1791 - Westmalle 1873)
- 1872 - 1896: Benedictus (Michel) Wuyts (Vlimmeren 1819 - Westmalle 1921)
- 1896 - 1911: Ferdinandus (August) Broechoven (Berlaar 1839 - Westmalle 1921)
- 1911 - 1929: Herman Jozef (Jozef Petrus Karel) Smets (Antwerpen 1875 - Rome 1943)
- 1929 - 1939: Tarcisius (Cornelius) Van Der Kamp (Amsterdam 1891 - Weert 1939)
- 1940 - 1956: Robertus (Edward Jozef Modest) Eyckmans (Herentals 1887 - Westmalle 1971)
- 1956 - 1966: Edwardus (Albert Edward) Wellens (b. Uden 1916)
- 1967 - 1975: Deodatus (Godelief Frans Jan) Dewilde (b. Rumbeke 1903)
- 1975 - 1987: Bartholomeus De Strycker (b. Lier 1921)
- 1987 - 2004: Ivo (Raphaël) Dujardin (b. Turnhout 1938)
- 2004 - : Philip Nathanaël (Gaston) Koninkx (b. Zandhoven 1947)

== Burials ==
- Martinus Dom

== See also ==
- Monasterium Magnificat

== Sources ==
- Monks of the abbey, Geschiedenis der Abdij van het Heilig Hart van Jezus te Westmalle, Westmalle, 1904.
- Jan B. Van Damme o.c.r., Cistercienzers of Trappisten te Westmalle, Westmalle, 1974
- Jan B. Van Damme o.c.r., Geschiedenis van de Trappistenabdij te Westmalle (1794–1956), Westmalle, 1977
- J. Van Remoortere, Ippa's Abdijengids voor Belgie, Lanno, 1990
- F. Verwulgen, Omtrent de Trappisten, 200 jaar abdij van Westmalle, Davidsfonds Westmalle, 1994
