= Quadrupel =

Type of beer, with an alcohol by volume of 9.1% to 14.2%

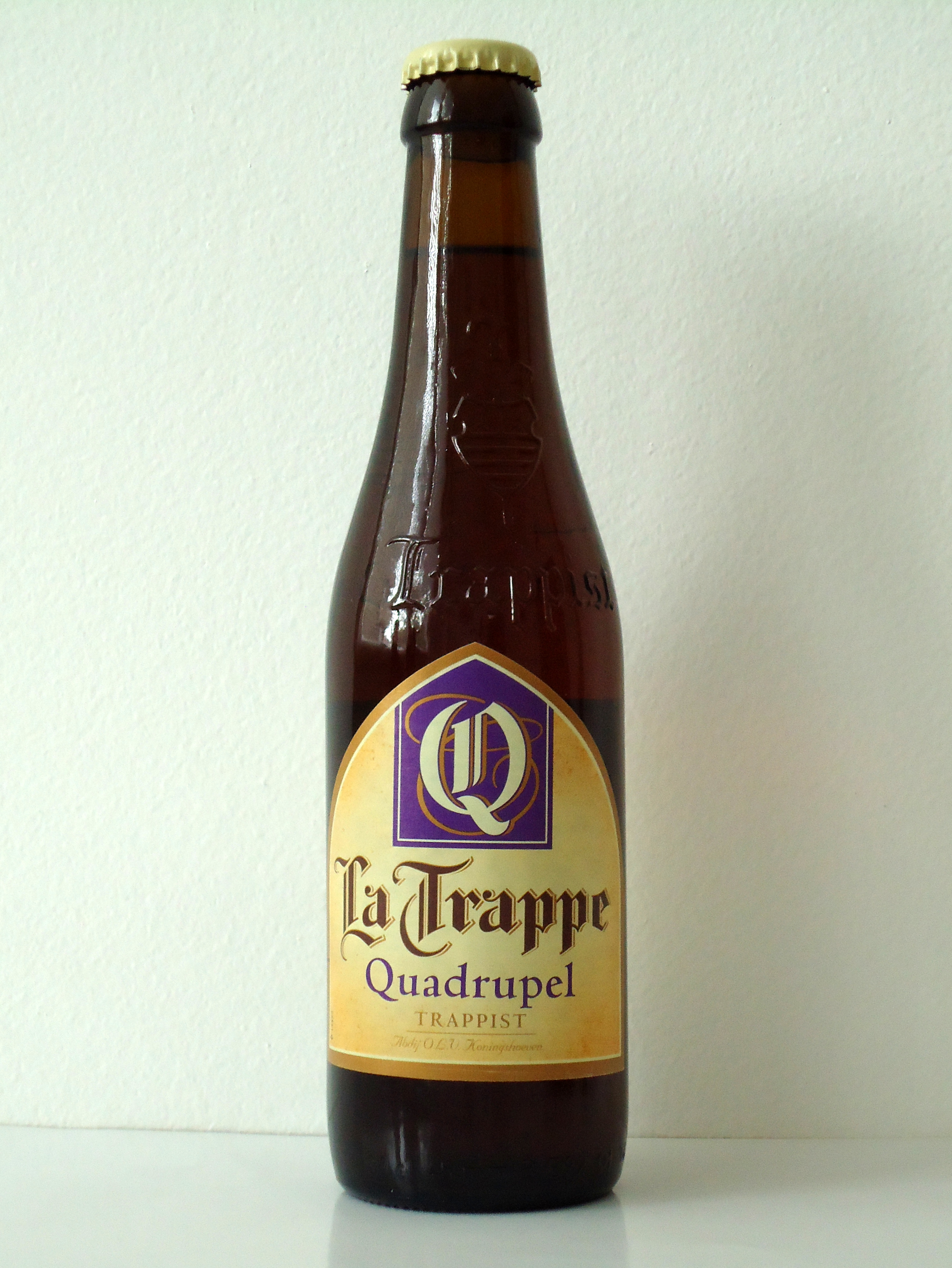
Bottle of La Trappe Quadrupel

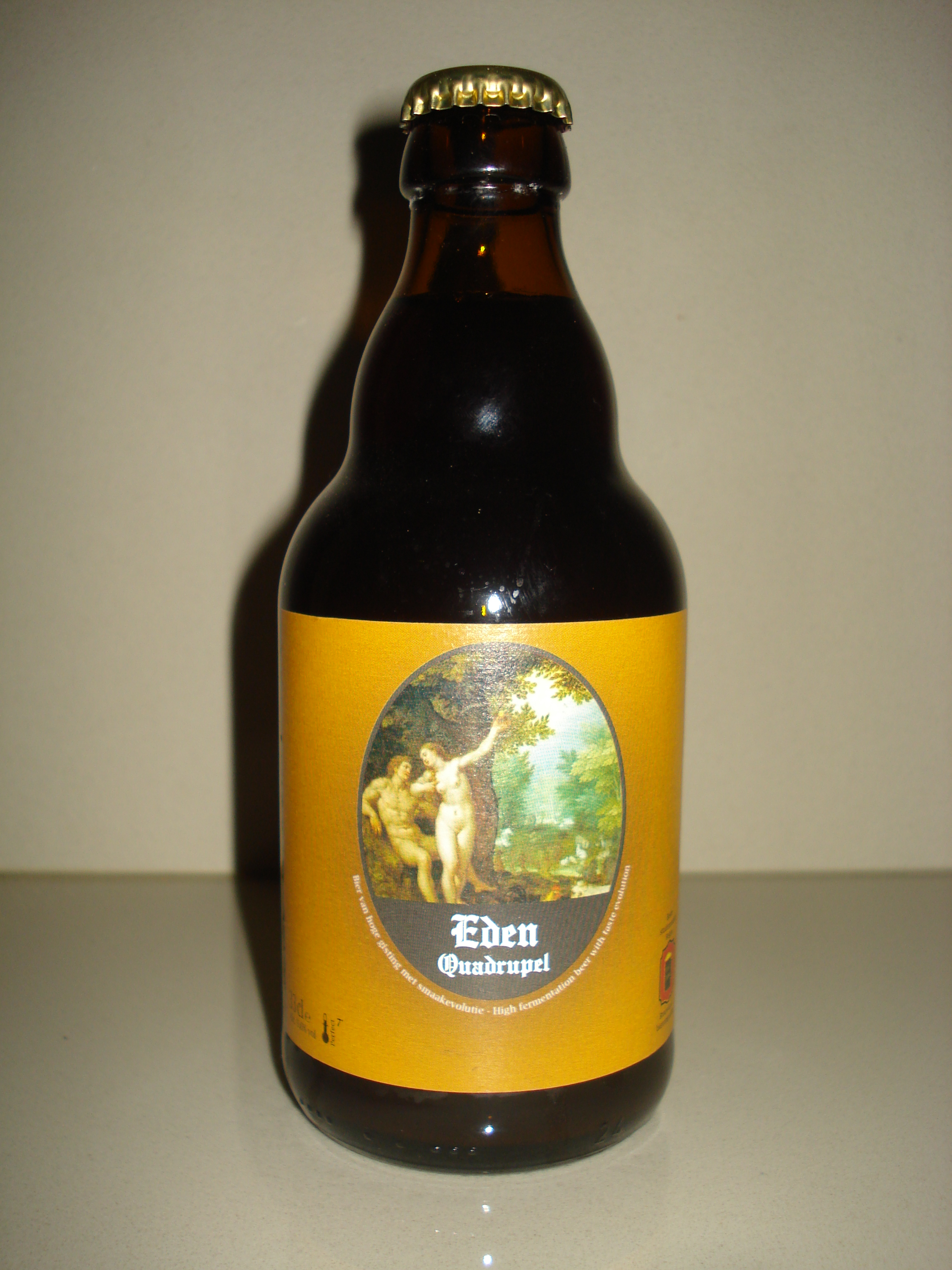
Bottle of Belgian made quadrupel

A Quadrupel (Flemish for 'quadruple') is a type of beer, with an alcohol by volume of 9.1% to 14.2%.

There is little agreement on the status of Quadrupel as a beer style. Writer Tim Webb notes that similar beers are called Grand Cru in Belgium even though the idea is derived from the Belgian beer naming convention that uses numerical values descriptive of the number of prominent ingredients.

Quadrupel is the brand name of a strong seasonal beer La Trappe Quadrupel brewed by De Koningshoeven Brewery in the Netherlands, one of the twelve Trappist breweries in the world.

In other countries, particularly the United States, quadrupel or quad has become a generic trademark. The term may refer to an especially strong style of dark ale with a spicy, ripe fruit flavor.

== See also ==
- Dubbel
- Tripel
- Trappist beer
- Beer in Belgium
