= Scherpenberg mill =

Tower mill in Belgium

Scherpenberg Mill
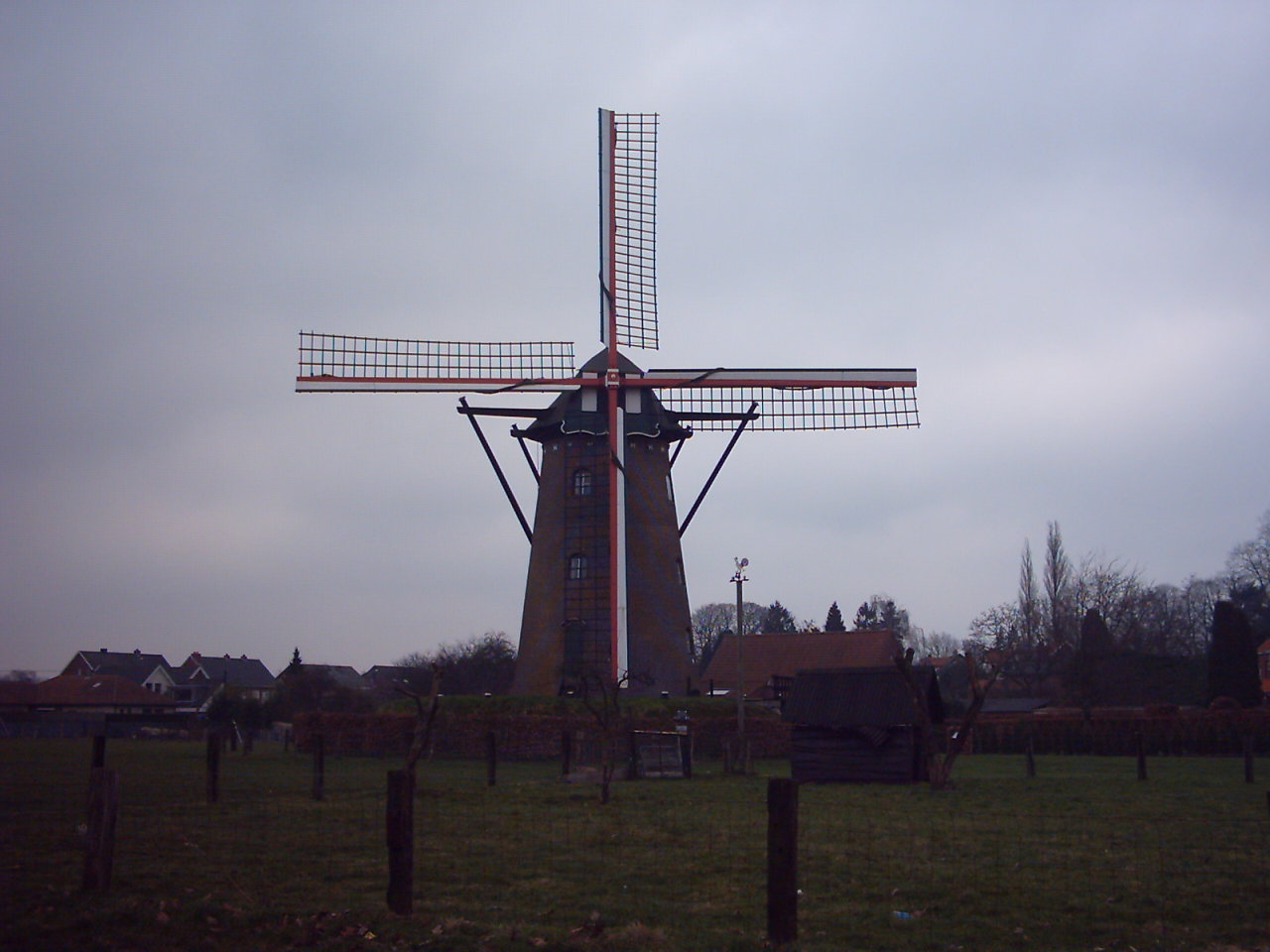
- Scherpenberg Mill, February 2007

Origin
- Mill location: Westmalle, Belgium
- Coordinates: 51.2951°N 4.68048°E
- Operator(s): Municipal authorities of Malle
- Year built: 1843 – Joannes and Petrus Mullenbrück

Information
- Purpose: Flour mill
- Type: Tower mill
- No. of sails: Four
- Type of sails: Common sails
- Winding: Tailpole and winch

The Scherpenberg mill, located in Westmalle, Belgium, is a tower mill that was built in 1843 to grind grain into flour. It is currently owned and operated by the municipal authorities of Malle, who only operate it temporarily.

== History ==
The mill was built in 1843 by Joannes and Petrus Mullenbrück (alternately found as Meulenbroeck). The Mullenbrücks were the sons of Christianus Mullenbrück, who had come from Westphalia to Westmalle in 1808. Joannes became a miller in Westmalle, and his brother Petrus moved to Ossendrecht in the Netherlands where he also worked as a miller.

The mill was in use until 1961, when it became obsolete. The municipality of Westmalle subsequently purchased the mill in 1962, when Jozef Caers began the first restoration work. After several years or restoration, the mill again became operational in 1985. In 2003, major maintenance work was carried out.

== Owners and millers ==
The owners of the mill are as follows:

- Christianus Mullenbrück-Aerts (1843–1853)
- Joannes Mullenbrück-Nicolay (1853–1881)
- Franciscus Stevens-Mullenbrück (1881–1891)
- Franciscus Janssens-Geerts (1891–1930)
- Gustaaf Janssens-Van de Mierop, and his widow (1930–1954)
- Magdalena and Laura Huyskens-Janssens (1956–1962)
- Municipal authorities of Westmalle (1962–1977)
- Municipal authorities of Malle (as of 1977)

The millers are as follows, please note that some owners also acted as miller:

- Joannes Mullenbrück-Nicolay (1843–1881)
- Franciscus Stevens-Mullenbrück (1881–1891)
- Jan Verschueren (1891–1927)
- Frans Boekx (1927–1954)
- Jozef Boekx (1954–1962)
- Municipal authorities of Westmalle (1962–1977)
- Municipal authorities of Malle (as of 1977)

== See also ==
- Molinology
- Windmill
