= Kontich =

- Municipality
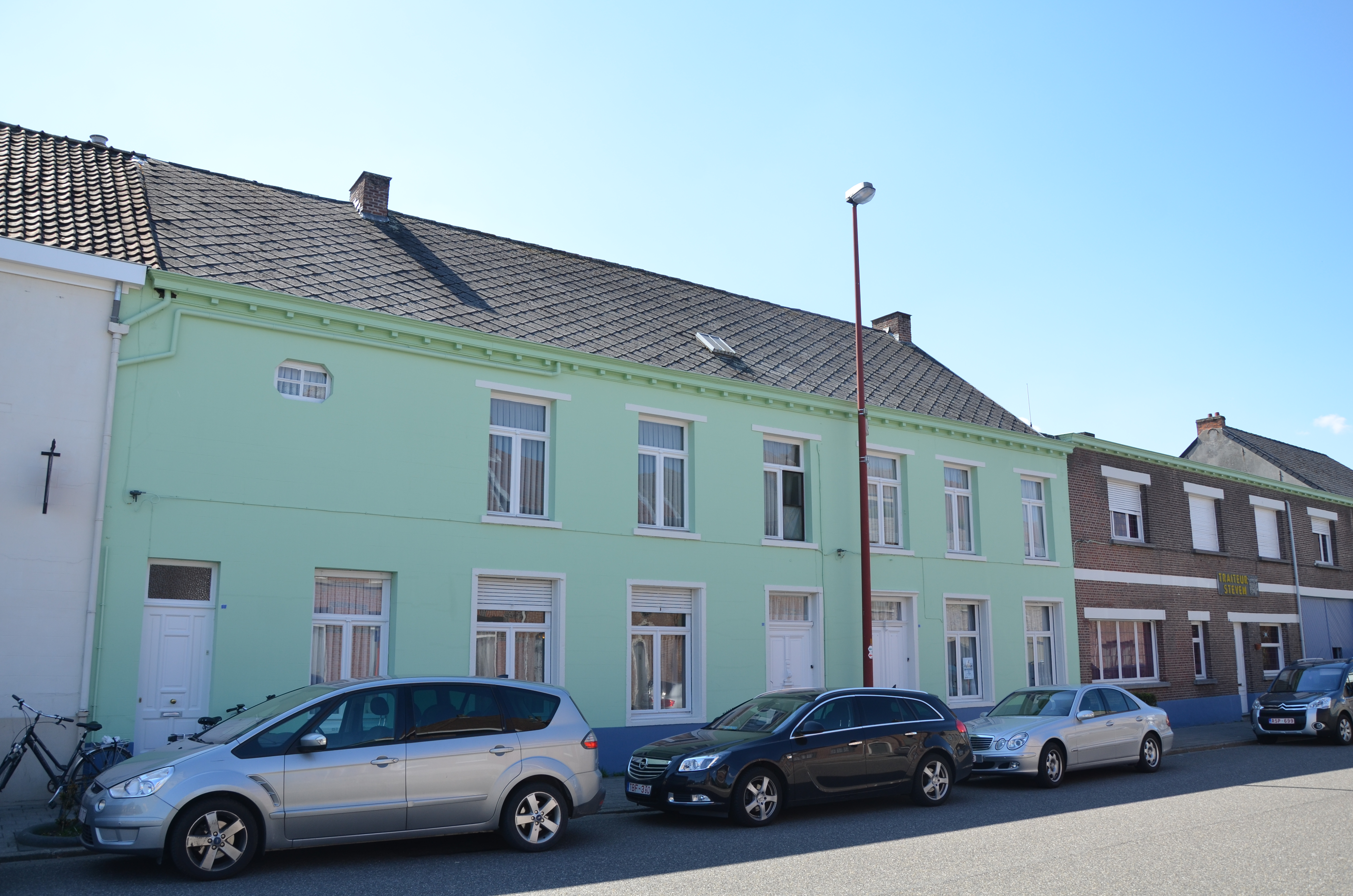

- Flag Coat of arms

- Location of Kontich in the province of Antwerp
- Interactive map of Kontich
- Location in Belgium
- Coordinates: 51°08′N 04°27′E
- Country: Belgium
- Community: Flemish Community
- Region: Flemish Region
- Province: Antwerp
- Arrondissement: Antwerp

Government
  - Mayor: Bart Seldeslachts (N-VA)
  - Governing parties: N-VA, Open Vld

Area
  - Total: 23.8 km^{2} (9.2 sq mi)

Population (2020-01-01)
  - Total: 21,203
  - Density: 891/km^{2} (2,310/sq mi)
- Postal codes: 2550
- NIS code: 11024
- Area codes: 03, 015
- Website: www.kontich.be

Kontich (Dutch pronunciation: [ˈkɔntɪx], old spelling: Contich) is a municipality located in the Belgian province of Antwerp. The municipality comprises the towns of Kontich proper and Waarloos. In 2021, Kontich had a total population of 21,260. The total area is 23.67 km^{2}.

Kontich exists of three parts: Kontich Centrum, Waarloos and Kontich Kazerne. Kontich Kazerne has a big industrial center and a train station on the line between Antwerp and Mechelen. The barracks (kazerne in Dutch) which gave the name to the settlement have closed however.

The Centrum part of Kontich has the town center.

The E19 highway between Antwerp and Brussels passes through Kontich.

"Kontich" comes from the Latin word condacum which means confluence of 2 streams.

== Famous inhabitants ==
- Marthe De Pillecyn, singer (b. 1996)
- Timo Descamps, actor (b. 1976)
- Martinus Dom, first abbot of the Trappist abbey of Westmalle (1791–1873)
- Benedict Neefs, Abbot of Hemiksem (1741–1790)
- Matz Sels, footballer (b. 1992)
- Albert Thys, painter (1894–1976)
- Yasmine, singer (1972–2009)
- Bart De Wever, politician (b. 1970)

== Gastronomy ==
Kontich is home to several notable restaurants that have garnered recognition in national and international culinary guides. Among these, Fortuin, a contemporary brasserie, was named "Brasserie of the Year 2022" by Gault&Millau Belgium, receiving a score of 13.5 out of 20. Vintage is a fine dining restaurant that was featured in the Michelin Guide for several years and held a Michelin star until 2023.

== Gallery ==
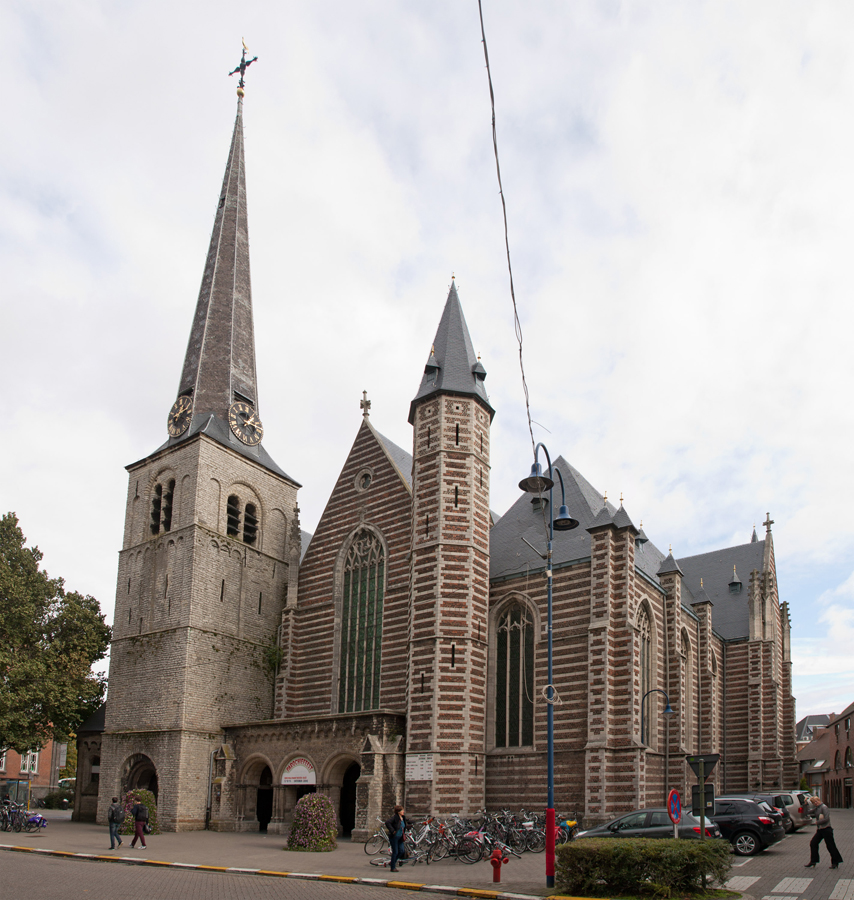
Sint-Martinuskerk

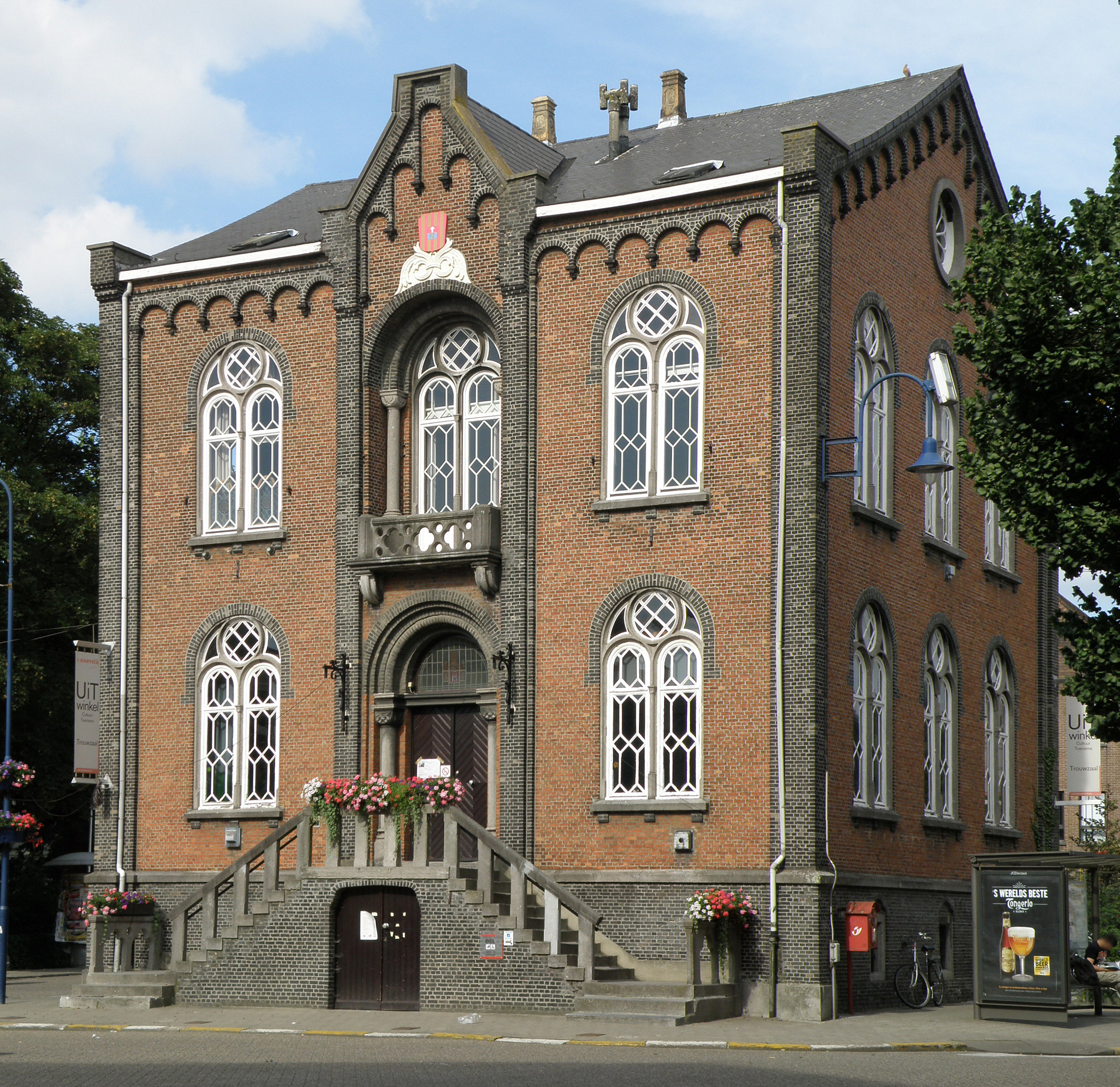
Former town hall

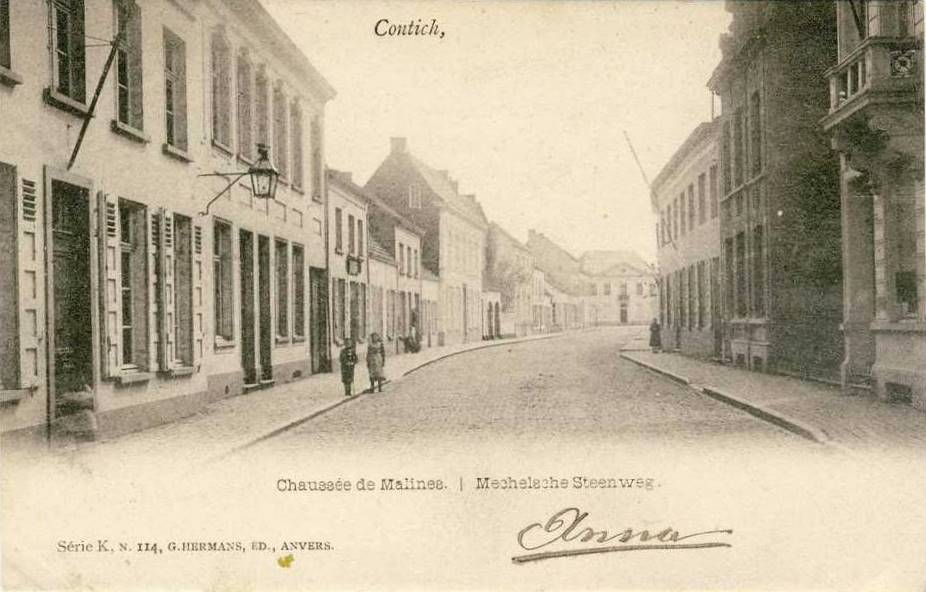
Postcard picturing
"Chaussée de Malines, Mechelsesteenweg"
from around 1900

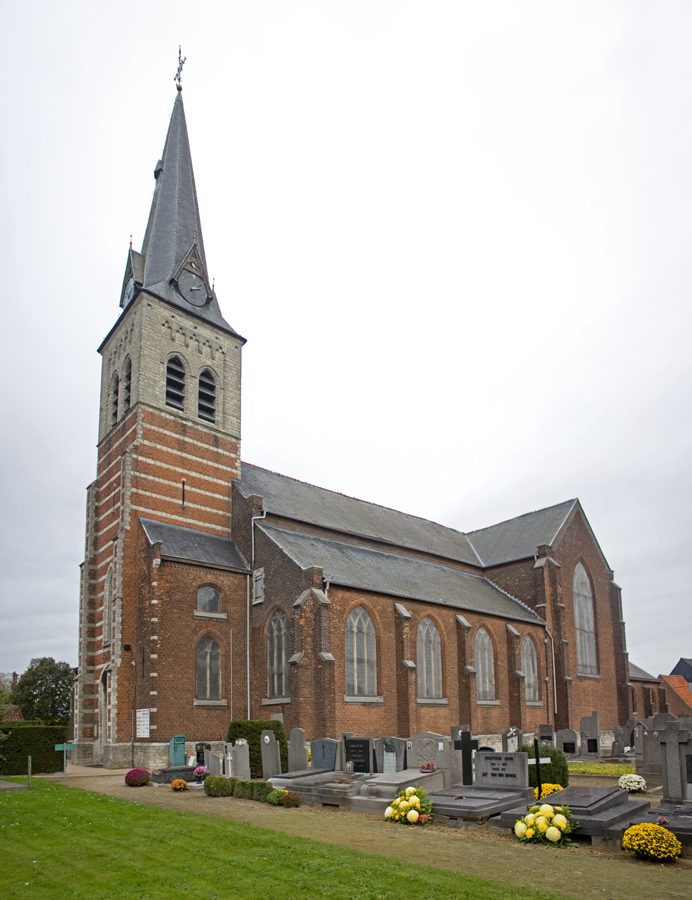
Municipal church Sint-Michiel in Waarloos

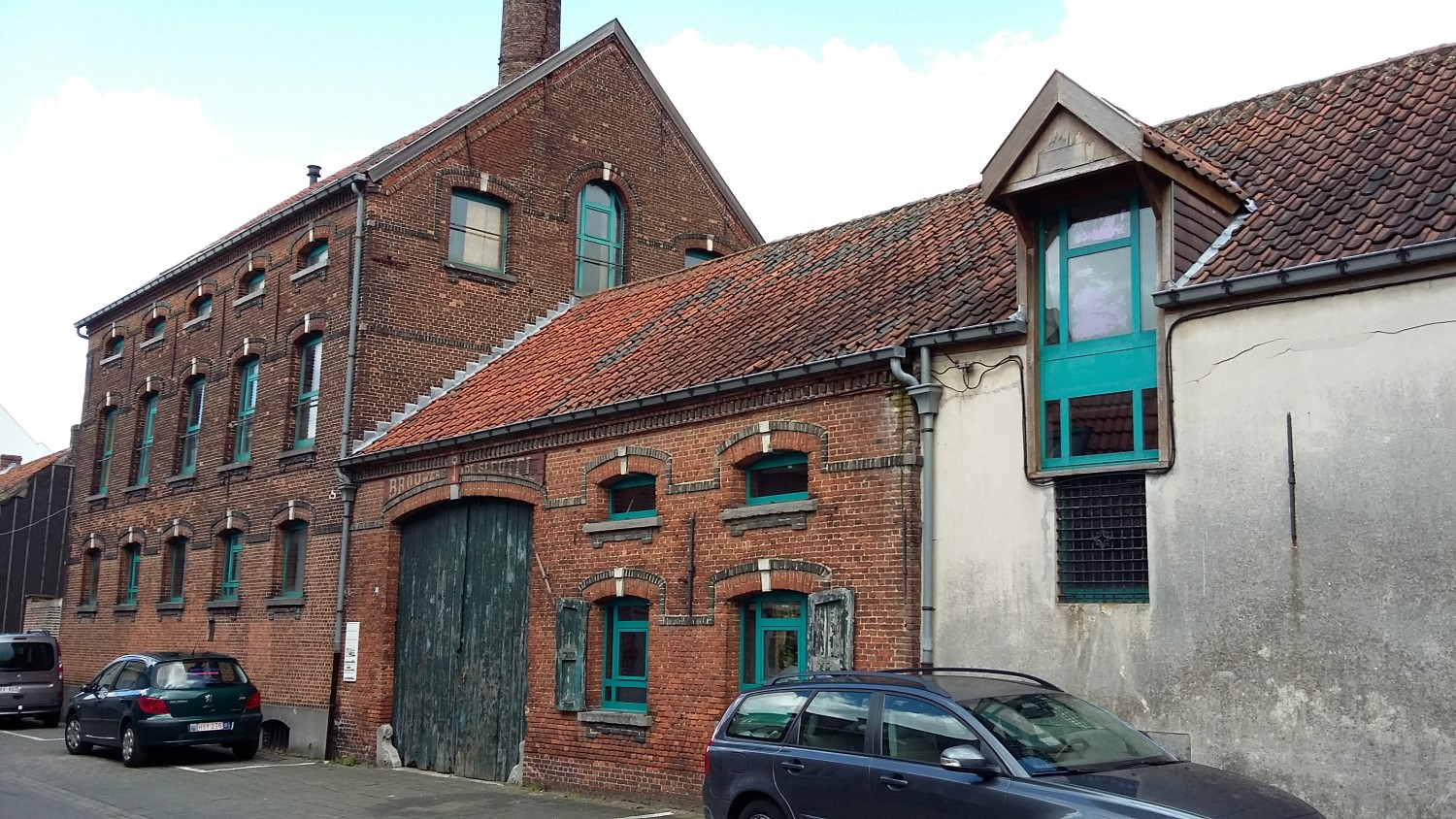
Former De Sleutel Brewery
