= Tripel =

Type of high-alcohol blonde beer

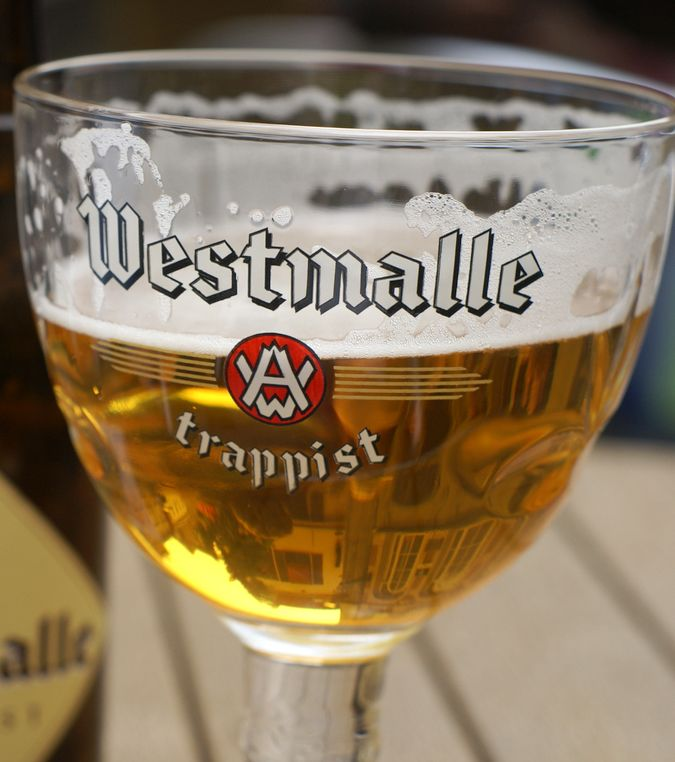
Westmalle Tripel

Tripel is a term used by brewers mainly in the Low Countries, some other European countries, and the U.S. to describe a strong pale ale, loosely in the style of Westmalle Tripel. The origin of the term is unknown, though the main theory is that it indicates strength in some way. It was used in 1956 by the Trappist brewery, Westmalle, to rename the strongest beer in their range, though both the term Tripel and the style of beer associated with the name (strong pale ale), were in existence before 1956. The style of Westmalle's Tripel and the name was widely copied by the breweries of Belgium, and in 1987 another Trappist brewery, the Koningshoeven in the Netherlands, expanded their range with a beer called La Trappe Tripel, though they also produced a stronger beer they termed La Trappe Quadrupel. The term spread to the U.S. and other countries, and is applied by a range of secular brewers to a strong pale ale in the style of Westmalle Tripel.

== History ==
The term Tripel comes from the Low Countries (now Netherlands and Belgium); though the origin of the term is unknown. The two main theories are that it indicates strength, either by a series of marks, such as crosses, on a cask - X for the weakest strength, XX for medium strength, and XXX for the strongest beer, or by reference to the original gravity of a beer which roughly corresponds to 3% abv, 6% abv or 9% abv. According to brewing historian Michael Jackson, the first golden strong pale ale associated with the term was brewed by Hendrik Verlinden of the Drie Linden (Three Lindens) brewery in the early 1930s, when ale brewers were looking to compete with the pale lagers from Plzeň. Verlinden had an association with the Trappist brewery, Westmalle, assisting them with brewing, and becoming the only secular brewer allowed to carry the Trappist Beer designation. In 1933, Westmalle released a beer under the name Superbier; this was the year after Verlinden produced a golden strong pale ale for his own brewery, the Witkap Pater (now known as Witkap Tripel, produced by the Slaghmuylder Brewery). It was a strong blonde ale and was very likely based on a blonde beer the monks had been brewing sporadically since 1931. In 1956 they renamed it Tripel, and the popularity of that brand ensured the name is still strongly associated with the Westmalle brewery, though both the term Tripel and the style of beer associated with the name (strong pale ale), were in existence before 1956. In 1956, the recipe was modified by the head brewer of Westmalle, Brother Thomas, by the addition of more hops, and it then took on the name Tripel. It has remained essentially unchanged since. Tim Webb in his Good Beer Guide to Belgium says that some of the pre-1956 beers called Tripel were dark, in contrast to modern beers using the term.

== See also ==
- Dubbel
- Quadrupel
- Beer in Belgium
- Beer in the United States
