= International Union of Soil Sciences =

International scientific union

- Abbreviation: IUSS
- Formation: 1924; 102 years ago
- Type: INGO
- Headquarters: Rome
- Region served: Worldwide
- Official language: English
- President: Victor Okechukwu Chude (Nigeria)
- Parent organization: International Science Council
- Website: iuss.org

The International Union of Soil Sciences (IUSS), founded in 1924 under the name International Society of Soil Science, is a scientific union and member of the International Science Council (ISC).

The Union has 86 national and regional member societies with about 60,000 scientists in several countries and individual members in 57 countries. Every four years, the IUSS holds the World Congress of Soil Science.

As of January 2023, the secretariat was taken over by the Council for Agricultural Research and Economics of Italy. Previously, the secretariat was managed by Sigbert Huber, an officer of the Environment Agency Austria (Umweltbundesamt), located in Vienna.

== Mission ==
The purpose of the IUSS is to promote all branches of soil science and its applications, to promote contacts among scientists and other persons engaged in the study and the application of soil science; to stimulate scientific research and to further the application of such research.

The IUSS is a founding partner of the International Year of Planet Earth and supports all of its activities. The IUSS has contributed to the International Year of Planet Earth's brochure "Soil – earth's living skin", which has been translated into several languages.

The IUSS publishes monthly the IUSS Alert and twice a year the IUSS Bulletin. December 5 is celebrated as the World Soil Day.

== Divisions ==
The IUSS has Divisions and Commissions in the following areas:

=== Division 1 – Soils in space and time ===
- C1.1 Soil morphology and micromorphology
- C1.2 Soil geography
- C1.3 Soil genesis
- C1.4 Soil classification
- C1.5 Pedometrics
- C1.6 Paleopedology

=== Division 2 – Soil properties and processes ===
- C2.1 Soil physics
- C2.2 Soil chemistry
- C2.3 Soil biology
- C2.4 Soil mineralogy
- C2.5 Soil chemical, physical and biological interfacial reactions

=== Division 3 – Soil use and management ===
- C3.1 Soil evaluation and land use planning
- C3.2 Soil and water conservation
- C3.3 Soil fertility and plant nutrition
- C3.4 Soil engineering and technology
- C3.5 Soil degradation control, remediation, and reclamation

=== Division 4 – The role of soil in sustaining society and the environment ===
- C4.1 Soil and the environment
- C4.2 Soil, food security, and human health
- C4.3 Soil and land use change
- C4.4 Soil education and public awareness
- C4.5 History, philosophy, and sociology of soil science

This structure and the Commissions have grown from the original six Commissions established in 1924.

In addition, the IUSS holds many Working Groups. Every Working Group is associated to a Commission.

== President ==
Until 2014, the IUSS President was designated by the national soil science society that was responsible for the next World Congress of Soil Science. This was normally a four-year period. The change in office was immediately after closing the World Congress. However, many tasks of scientific leadership were done by a Secretary-General. The last IUSS President according to this regulation was Jae Yang, who acted from the closure of the World Congress 2010 till the closure of the World Congress 2014.

Since 2014, the IUSS President is elected by the IUSS Council for a two-year period. Since 2017, the change in office is January 1. The election is more than two years in advance. The IUSS President is the scientific leader, and the Secretary (instead of the former Secretary-General) is the organizing leader. The first IUSS President according to the new regulation was Rainer Horn, who acted from the closure (June 13) of the World Congress 2014 till December 31, 2016.

== Congresses and Presidents ==
World Congresses of Soil Science and IUSS Presidents

| Nr | Congress | Location | | President | | |
|---|---|---|---|---|---|---|
| 25. | 2034 | Leipzig | Germany | 2033-2034 | | |
| | | | | 2031-2032 | | |
| 24. | 2030 | Toronto | Canada | 2029-2030 | Rosa Maria Poch Claret | Spain |
| | | | | 2027-2028 | Bruce Lascelles | United Kingdom |
| 23. | 2026 | Nanjing | China | 2025–2026 | Victor Okechukwu Chude | Nigeria |
| | | | | 2023-2024 | Edoardo A.C. Costantini | Italy |
| 22. | 2022 | Glasgow | United Kingdom | 2021–2022 | Laura Bertha Reyes Sánchez | Mexico |
| | | | | 2019–2020 | Takashi Kosaki | Japan |
| 21. | 2018 | Rio de Janeiro | Brazil | 2017–2018 | Rattan Lal | United States |
| 20. | 2014 | Jeju-do Island | South Korea | 2014–2016 | Rainer Horn | Germany |
| 19. | 2010 | Brisbane, Queensland | Australia | 2010–2014 | Jae Yang | South Korea |
| 18. | 2006 | Philadelphia | United States | 2006–2010 | R.S. Swift | Australia |
| 17. | 2002 | Bangkok | Thailand | 2002–2006 | D. L. Sparks | United States |
| 16. | 1998 | Montpellier | France | 1998–2002 | S. Theerawong | Thailand |
| 15. | 1994 | Acapulco | Mexico | 1994–1998 | A. Ruellan | France |
| 14. | 1990 | Kyoto | Japan | 1990–1994 | A.A. Santelises | Mexico |
| 13. | 1986 | Hamburg | West Germany | 1986–1990 | A. Tanaka | Japan |
| 12. | 1982 | New Delhi | India | 1982–1986 | K.H. Hartge | West Germany |
| 11. | 1978 | Edmonton, Alberta | Canada | 1978–1982 | J.S. Kanwar | India |
| 10. | 1974 | Moscow | Soviet Union | 1974–1978 | C.F. Bentley | Canada |
| 9. | 1968 | Adelaide | Australia | 1968–1974 | V.A. Kovda | Soviet Union |
| 8. | 1964 | Bucharest | Romania | 1964–1968 | E.G. Hallsworth | Australia |
| 7. | 1960 | Madison, Wisconsin | United States | 1960–1964 | N.C. Cernescu | Romania |
| 6. | 1956 | Paris | France | 1956–1960 | R. Bradfield | United States |
| 5. | 1954 | Kinshasa (Leopoldville) | (Democratic Republic of the Congo) DR Congo | 1954–1956 | A. Oudin | France |
| 4. | 1950 | Amsterdam | Netherlands | 1950–1954 | R. Tavernier | Belgium |
| | x | | | 1950 | C.H. Edelman | Netherlands |
| 3. | 1935 | Oxford | United Kingdom | 1935-1940 | F.W. Schucht | Germany |
| 2. | 1930 | Leningrad | Soviet Union | 1930–1935 | J. Russell | United Kingdom |
| 1. | 1927 | Washington, D.C. | United States | 1927–1930 | K. Gedroiz | Soviet Union |
| Fd. | 1924 | Rome | Italy | 1924–1927 | J. G. Lipman | United States |

== See also ==
- World Congress of Soil Science (WCSS)
