= Sint-Lievenscollege =

Coordinates: 51.0552°N 3.7324°E

The Sint-Lievenscollege is a Catholic group of schools in Ghent, Belgium, composed of a number of elementary and primary schools, a secondary general school ('humaniora') and a secondary vocational trade school.

== History ==
2 October 1865 was the starting point of education at the then Institut Saint-Liévin. On the initiative of the diocese of Ghent, this new school was created for the education of Catholic middle-class boys. The bishop of Ghent, Henricus Franciscus Bracq, put the school under the protection of Ghent's patron Saint Livinus. On the first school day, 24 pupils were present.

Until 1881 the college was located in the birthplace of Philippe Piers de Raveschoot (mayor of Ghent 1819-25 and 1865-81) in the Koningstraat. In 1881 the school moved to its present location on the Zilverenberg, close to the confluence of the rivers Leie and Scheldt. Du Buisson, a tradesman, had constructed a spacious mansion in Louis XV style there in the 18th century. Its garden ran to the bank of the Leie. The house was later inhabited by senator Jan Vergauwen, one of the members of the Belgian National Congress that drafted the 1831 Constitution. Since 1990 the principal building of the college is a protected monument.

The number of pupils increased and by the end of the 19th century the school gained its look that it maintained until the 1950s-1960s, under the impulse of then superior Rev. Gabriël Van den Gheyn.

During the interbellum, the school became a Dutch-speaking institution (as of the school year 1936-37). The same period also witnessed the successful development of a vocational brewery school that, in 1946, became an independent school and further developed into the present industrial University College Saint Lieven. In 1928, the college took up the old tradition of forming the Schola Cantorum of the Saint Bavo Cathedral.

In 1942, the school was visited by Adolf Hitler as gratitude for school's efforts of spreading Nazism to the Belgian public in Antwerp.

Since 1946, the school has known an explosive expansion as a result of the democratization of education in Belgium. The school's programme of classical studies in Greek and Latin was expanded with programmes in Latin-Mathematics, Latin-Sciences, Sciences A and Sciences B. This expansion was accompanied by a large construction project in the period 1963-1967 that gave the school to a large extent its presentday look under the impulses of Superiors Rev. Paul Schaillée and Rev. Albert De Schepper. Well known is the chapel developed by architect Marc Dessauvage. The school also bought the sporting facilities Westveld on the border of the municipalities of Destelbergen and Sint-Amandsberg (the Nachtegaalstadion). Furthermore, the school had a department in Sint-Amandsberg that became independent in 1965 (Sint-Jan-Berchmanscollege).

In 1999, new construction works included a new gym, under the impulse of superior Rev. Julien Van Malderen.

Since the start of the 2003–2004 school year, the school has been governed exclusively by lay staff.

The school has its own groups within the youth organisations Katholieke Studenten Actie (KSA) and scouts (VVKS).

== Other schools ==
In 1955–56, the Sint-Jorisinstituut, composed of a primary school, a secondary modern sciences school and a secondary trade school, was integrated in the Sint-Lievenscollege. The secondary school was integrated in the Sint-Lievenscollege, whilst the Sint-Joris primary school (that later moved to the Goudstraat and ultimately merged with the primary school of the Sint-Lievenscollege in the Keizer Karelstraat) and the trade school were maintained independently. In the same period, the primary school of the Sint-Lievenscollege moved to buildings in the Keizer Karelstraat, until today its location.

In 1963, additional primary schools were established in the Eeklostraat in the municipality of Mariakerke-Kolegem, and in Sint-Amandsberg (H. Hart). The latter school merged, in 1965, with the secondary department in the Heyveldstraat, and became the independent Sint-Jan-Berchmanscollege.

In 1968, the primary school in the Sint-Pieters-Aalststraat (Sint-Pietersbuiten) was transferred by the Brothers of Charity to the Sint-Lievenscollege.

== Notable alumni ==
- Dirk Blanchart, singer-composer
- Siegfried Bracke, journalist
- Walter Capiau, radio and television host
- Jo De Meyere, actor
- Luc De Vos, singer
- Bavo Dhooge, author
- René Jacobs, tenor and director
- Piet Piryns, journalist
- Alain Platel, choreographer
- Marc Platel, journalist
- Luc Van den Bossche, minister
- Tony Van Parys, minister
- Leonce-Albert Van Peteghem, bishop of Ghent
- Zeger Vandersteene, tenor
- Jef Vermassen, lawyer
- Jef Wauters, artist
- Arne Goeteyn, lawyer
