= Australian Society of Soil Science Incorporated =

The Australian Society of Soil Science Incorporated (ASSSI), publicly known as Soil Science Australia, is an Australian not-for-profit, professional association for soil scientists and people interested in the responsible management of Australia's soil resources. It was founded in 1955 to "advance soil science in the professional, academic, and technical fields". In 2011, the society adopted its public name. The organisation is governed by an elected Federal Council and has seven branches.

== Branches ==
Soil Science Australia has seven branches: New South Wales, Queensland, Riverina, South Australia, Tasmania, Victoria, and Western Australia.

The society offers members an opportunity to gain accreditation under the Certified Professional Soil Scientist (CPSS) Scheme.

== Activities ==
=== Conferences ===
Soil Science Australia holds a national conference every two years. Every fourth year, it is a joint conference with the New Zealand Society of Soil Sciences. The 2026 national conference will be held in Perth.
