= De Klinge =

- Deelgemeente
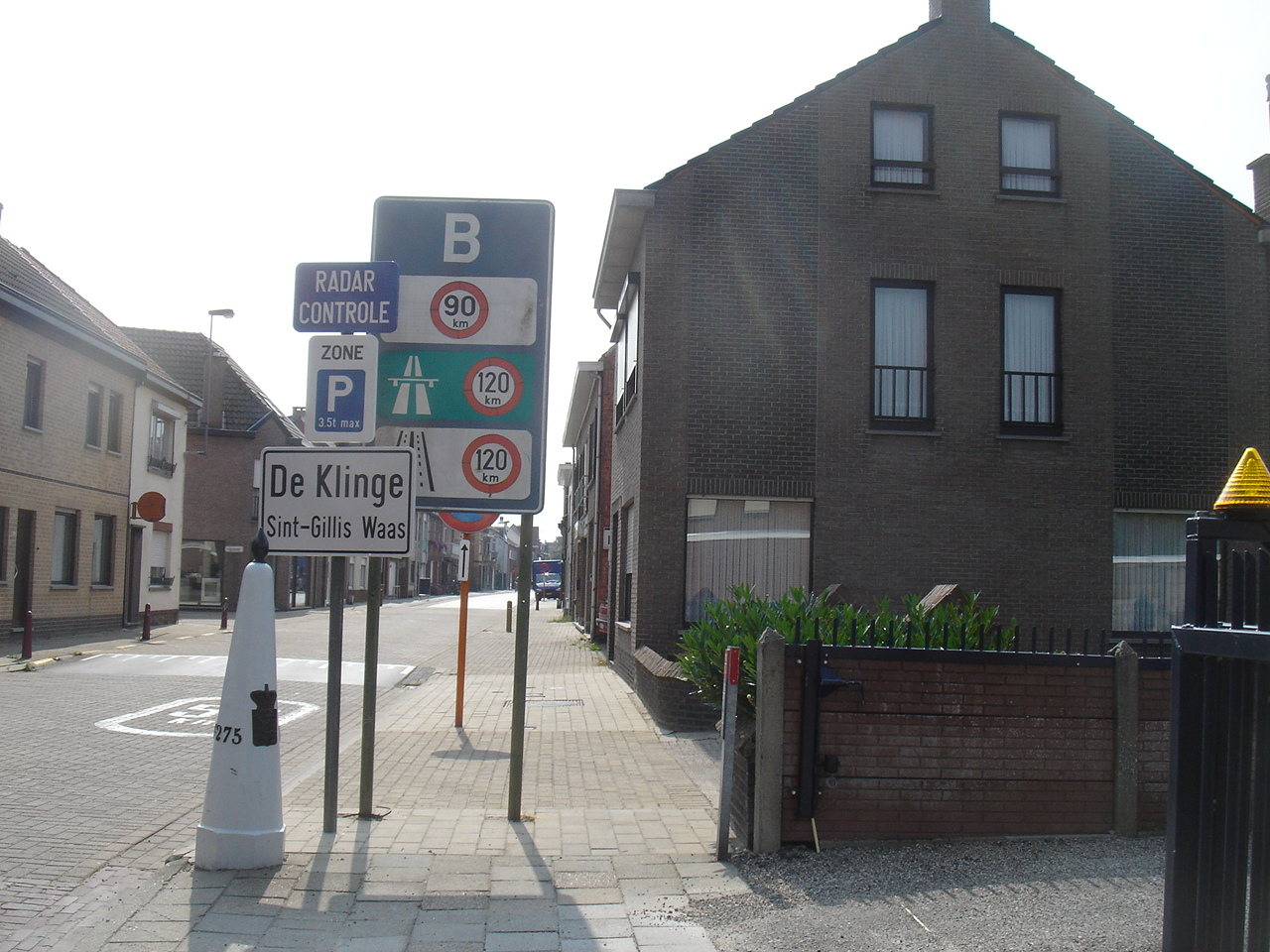
- Looking to De Klinge from Clinge on the Dutch side of the Belgian-Dutch border

- Location in Belgium
- Coordinates: 51°15′23″N 04°05′24″E
- Country: Belgium
- Province: East Flanders
- Municipality: Sint-Gillis-Waas

Area
  - Total: 2.81 km^{2} (1.08 sq mi)

Population (2021)
  - Total: 3,855
  - Density: 1,370/km^{2} (3,550/sq mi)
- Postal code: 9170
- Area code: 03

De Klinge (Dutch pronunciation: [də ˈklɪŋə]) is a Belgian town and part of the municipality of Sint-Gillis-Waas in the province of East Flanders (Oost-Vlaanderen), is located on the border with the Netherlands province of Zeeland and within the non-administrative region known as the Waasland or the Land van Waas. On the Dutch side of the border the town is called Clinge and is part of the municipality of Hulst. Sint-Niklaas is 10 kilometres south of De Klinge. The nearest large Belgian city is Antwerp (Antwerpen) to the east. The town is bordered by many forests, including the Stropersbos (the Stroper Forest), which are excellent for cycling and walking.

The dialect of Dutch spoken in De Klinge is called Klings, an East Flemish dialect. In the past there were several makers of clogs (wooden shoes) or klompen as they are called in Dutch. A statue called De Klomp stands in the middle of the round-about on the road from Sint-Gillis-Waas where the Bergstraat, Hogenakkerstraat, and Klingedijkstraat meet.

Every July a kermis festival, called the Klingse Kalsei Braderij is held on the main cobblestone street, Klingedorp. The town also has an abbey beer called Klingse Kalsei which is available during this festival and features the Klingedorpstraat on its label. This beer is not actually brewed in De Klinge but in Ertvelde by Van Steenberghe Brewery.

== Gallery ==
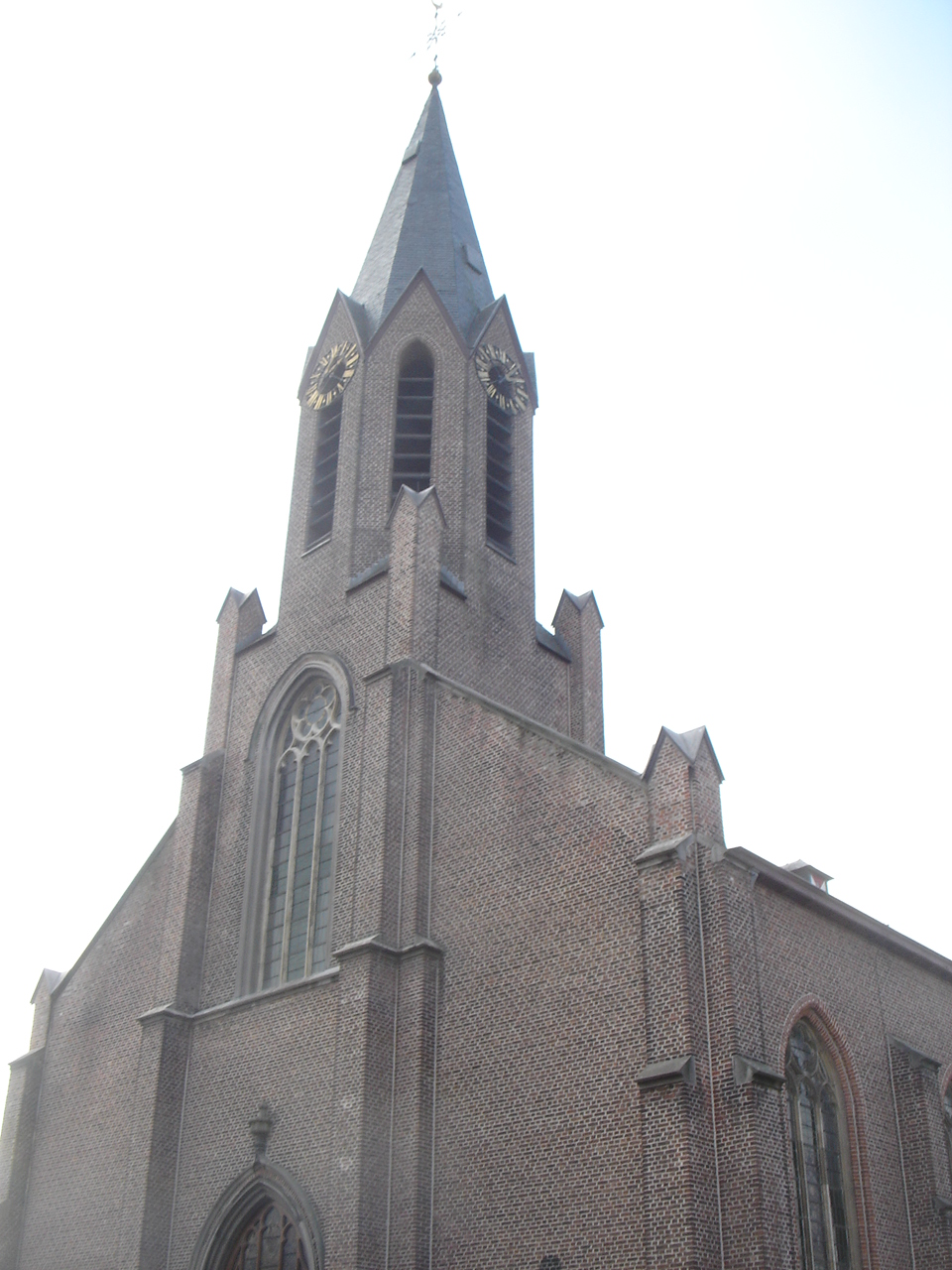
The main Catholic church in the centre of De Klinge. (September 2005)

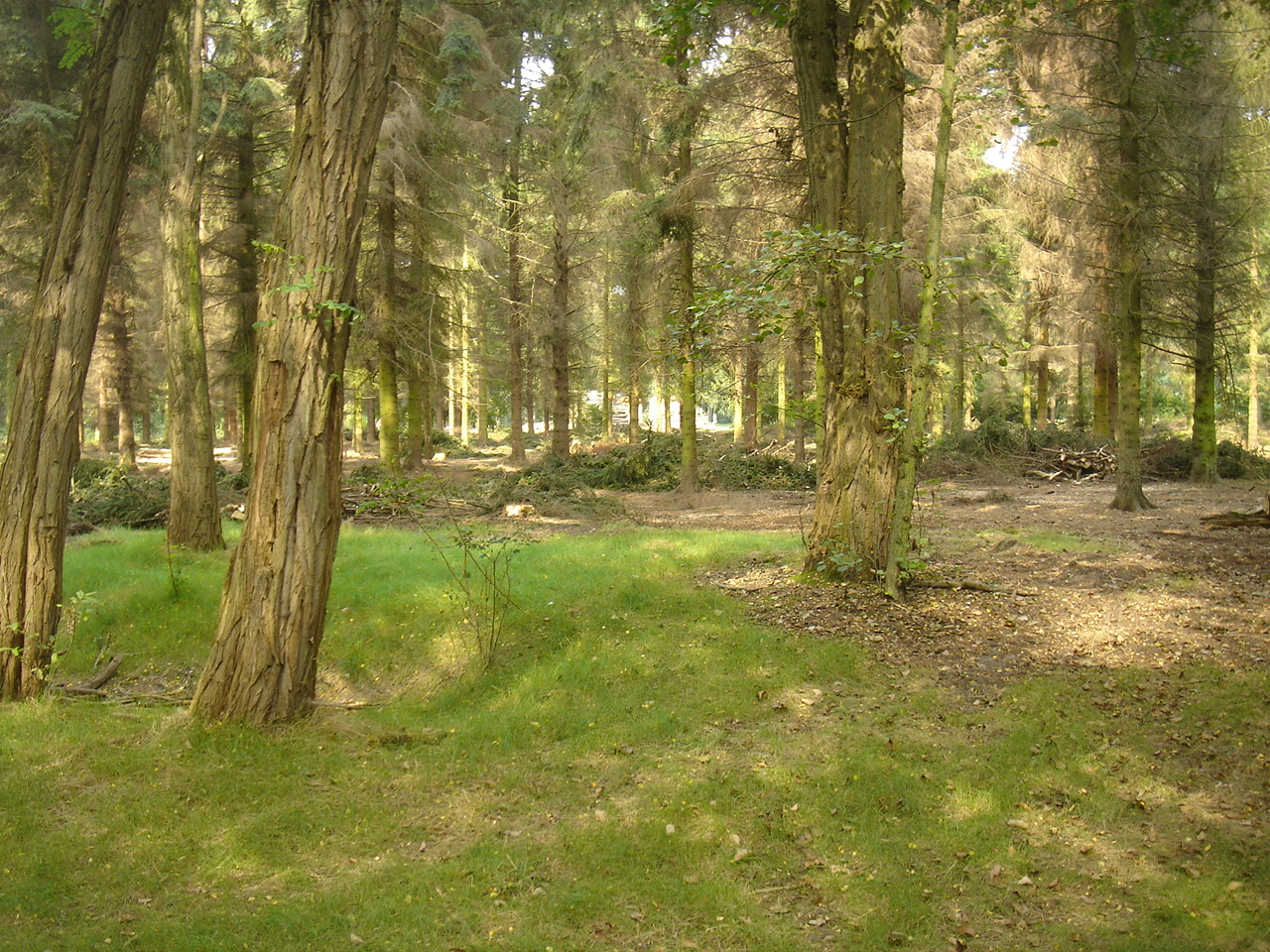
The forest along the Belgian-Dutch border taken behind the church in De Klinge on the Dutch side of the border. (September 2005)
