= Gebrouwen door Vrouwen =

Dutch brewery

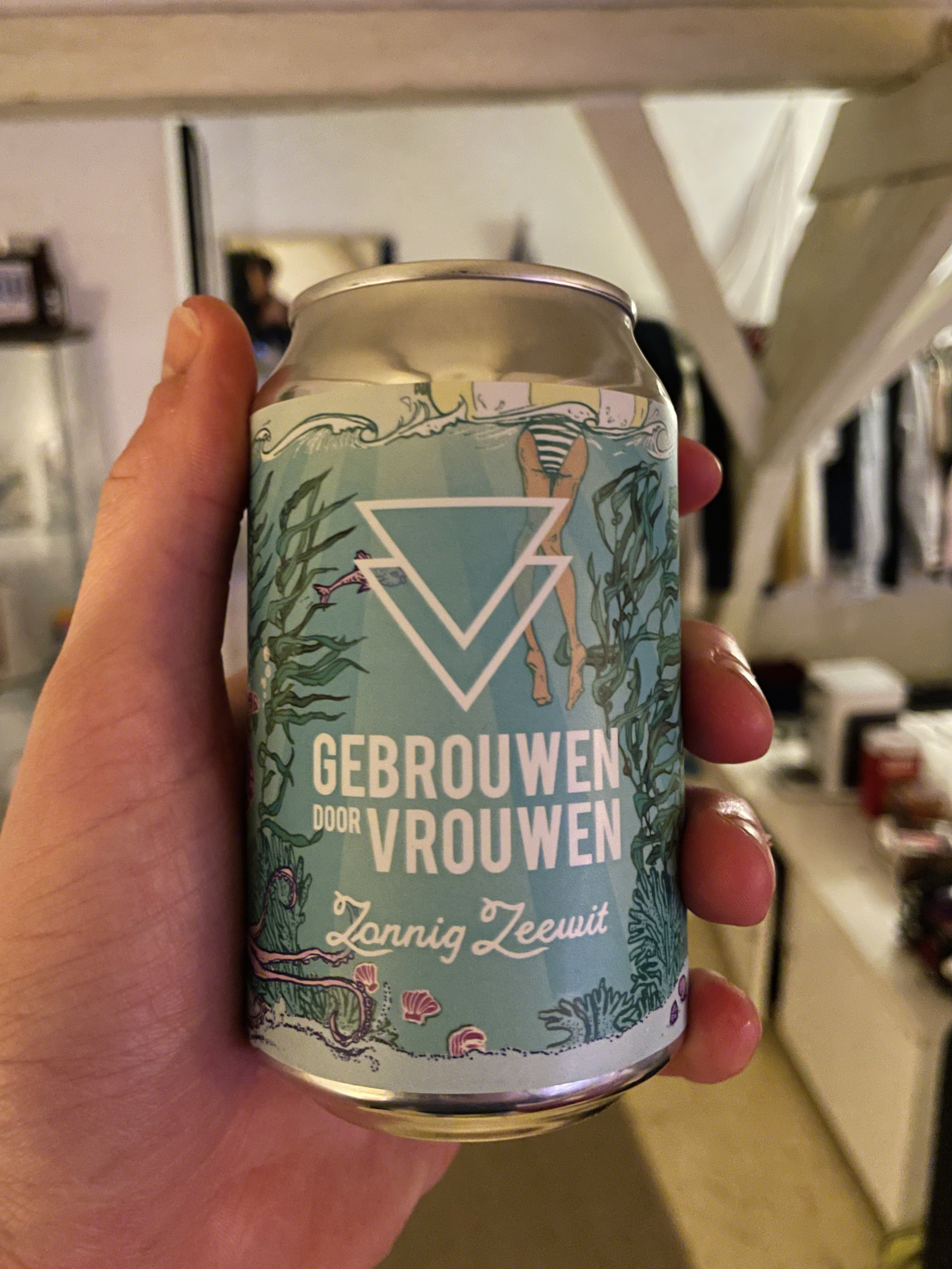
- Witbier Zonnig Zeewit by Gebrouwen door Vrouwen
- Location: Amsterdam, Netherlands
- Opened: 2015
- Key people: Do de Heij Tessel de Heij
- Website: gebrouwendoorvrouwen.nl

Active beers
Name	Type
Bloesem Blond	Belgian blonde
Gember Goud	Spiced beer
Gin Weizen	Wheat beer
Tricky Tripel	Belgian tripel

Seasonal beers
Name	Type
Citrus Paradisi	Wheat beer
Glüh Weizen	Spiced beer
Pumpkin Party	Pumpkin beer
Zonnig Zeewit	Witbier

Gebrouwen door Vrouwen (transl. 'Brewed by Women') is an Amsterdam beer brand, founded in 2015 by sisters Do and Tessel de Heij. It concerns a so-called gypsy brewer. As of 2020, the beers were brewed in the boilers of the Jopen and Troost breweries.

== History ==
Sisters Do and Tessel de Heij started brewing beer as a hobby in their kitchen in 2013. This grew into a business and the company was officially founded in 2015. An important motivation behind the sisters' decision to start the company was to break gender stereotypes in the beer world and to make beer more accessible to women, as beer is often culturally more associated with men than women.

After taking second place in the Albert Heijn Product Pitch in 2016, it was sold in all Albert Heijn stores in the Netherlands for a year. As a result, the brand continued to grow.

In 2019, the brewery opened its own bar in Amsterdam after a successful crowdfunding campaign.

== See also ==
- Beer in the Netherlands
- List of Dutch breweries
