= Brouwerij Egmond =

Dutch brewery

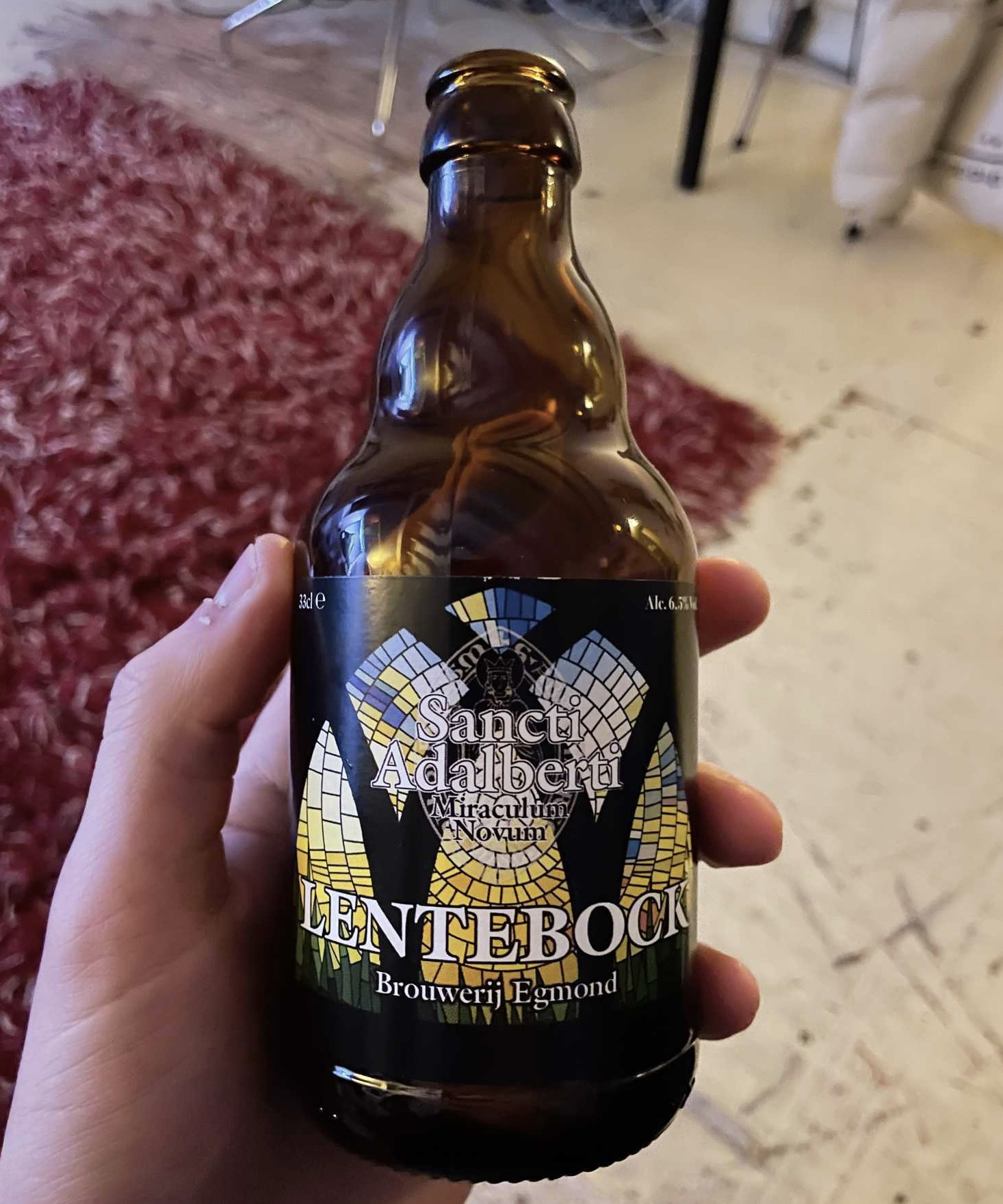
- Sancti Adalberti Lentebock by Brouwerij Egmond
- Location: Egmond aan den Hoef, North Holland, Netherlands
- Opened: 2010
- Website: brouwerijegmond.nl

Active beers
Name	Type
Sancti Adalberti Egmondse Blonde	Blonde ale
Sancti Adalberti Egmondse Dubbel	Belgian dubbel
Sancti Adalberti Egmondse Tripel	Belgian tripel
Sancti Adalberti Egmondse Weizen	Weizen
Sancti Adalberti Lentebock	Lentebock
Sancti Adalberti Abdijbock	Single bock
Sancti Adalberti Pastorale	Winter warmer

Inactive beers
Name	Type
Hortus Tripel	Belgian tripel
Sancti Adalberti Dies Decimus X	Belgian quadrupel
Sancti Adalberti Egmondse Witte	Hefeweizen
Sancti Adalberti Kwade Wouter	Scottish ale
Sancti Adalberti XII	Weizendoppelbock

Brouwerij Egmond (Dutch pronunciation: [ˌbrʌuəˈrɛi ˈɛxmɔnt]), also known as Sancti Adalberti, is a Dutch brewery in Egmond aan den Hoef that is connected to the local St Adelbert's Abbey. The brewery brews abbey beer: part of the profits goes to the abbey.

== History ==
Brouwerij Egmond was founded in 2010, when the first batch of Sancti Adalberti was brewed at Brouwerij de Prael in Amsterdam. At that time, the brewery was still a gypsy brewer: the beer was brewed entirely at De Prael because there was no brewing installation available in Egmond. Because the beer was a hit, plans to establish a brewery near the Egmond abbey were further developed.

In 2012, Brouwerij Egmond moved its brewing activities to De Proefbrouwerij in Lochristi, Belgium. Brouwerij Egmond has had its own brewery since 2018.

== Character ==
Brouwerij Egmond is connected to the abbey and the objectives of the brewery are also tailored to this. Part of the proceeds also ends up at the abbey, thus contributing to the preservation of this cultural heritage. Furthermore, Brouwerij Egmond has the ambition to brew environmentally consciously, in order to meet the demand for sustainable products. The beers are organic and carry the Skal quality mark.

== Beers ==
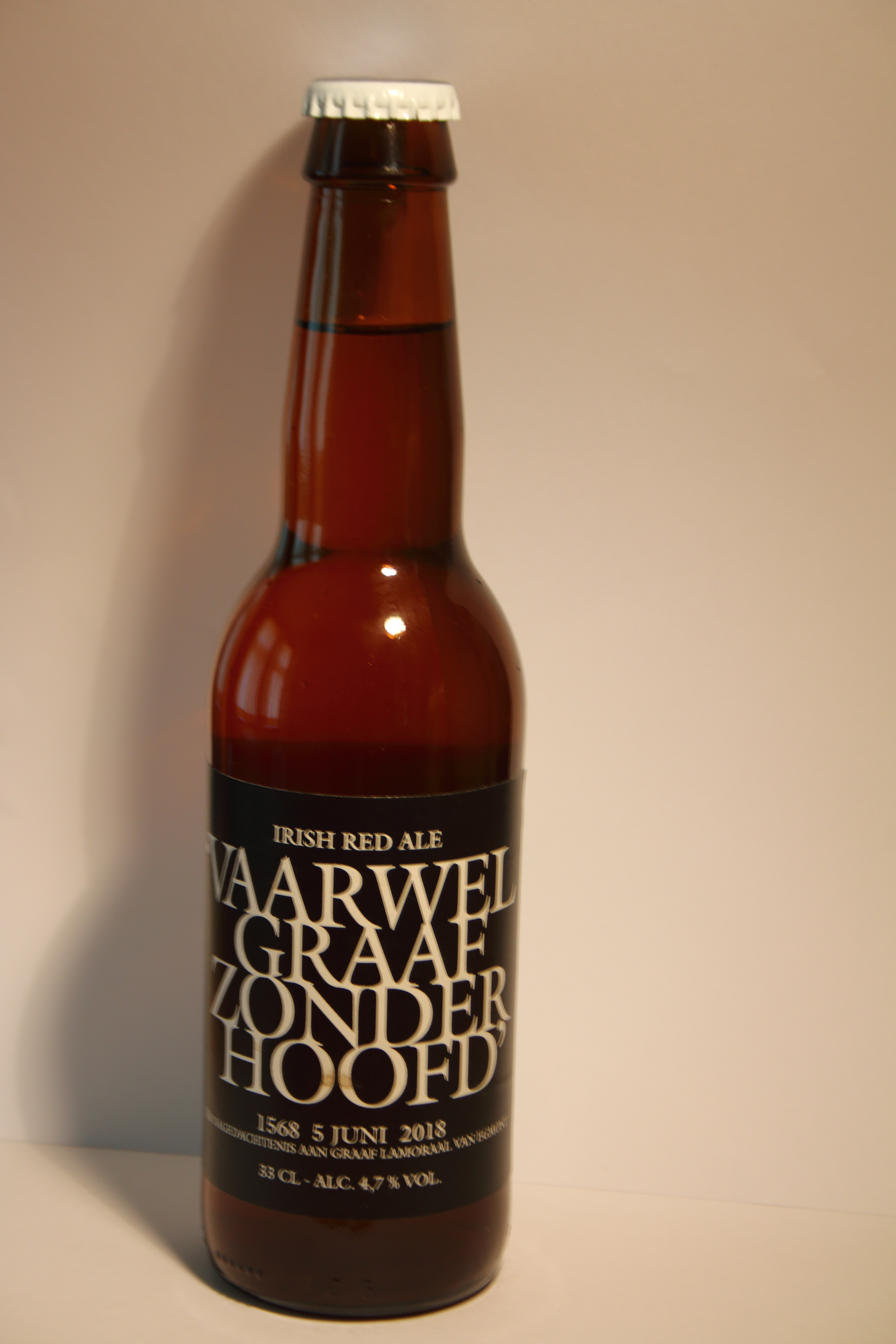
Anniversary Irish red ale Vaarwel Graaf zonder Hoofd

The beers from Brouwerij Egmond are marketed under the name Sancti Adalberti, with the caption Miraculum Novum, which can be read as "the last miracle of Saint Adelbert". This name explicitly refers to St Adelbert's Abbey to which the brewery is connected. A blonde, dubbel, tripel, weizen, lentebock, single bock and a winter warmer (Pastorale) are brewed. A small amount of spring water from the abbey is used in the beers, which is said to have medicinal properties. In 2018, the Irish red ale Vaarwel Graaf zonder Hoofd ("Farewell Headless Count") was released on the occasion of the 450th anniversary of the beheading of Lamoral, Count of Egmont.

The beers are available all across the Netherlands.

== Awards ==
In 2015, the brewery won gold, silver and bronze at the Dutch Beer Challenge, respectively in the categories "dark: light dark" (Sancti Adalberti Egmondse Dubbel), "wheat/grain beer: Weizen" (Sancti Adalberti Egmondse Witte) and "blonde: heavy blonde" (Sancti Adalberti Egmondse Tripel). In 2019, the gold medal was won at the Dutch Beer Festival for the Bock beer.

== See also ==
- Beer in the Netherlands
- List of Dutch breweries
