= List of Dutch breweries =

== A ==
- Alfa Brouwerij, Schinnen
- Amstel Brouwerij, Amsterdam

== B ==
- Bavaria Brouwerij, Lieshout
- Brand Brewery, Wijlre

== D ==
- Dommelsch, Dommelen

== E ==
- Brouwerij Egmond, Egmond aan den Hoef

== G ==
- Gebrouwen door Vrouwen, Amsterdam
- Grolsch, Enschede
- Gulpener Bierbrouwerij, Gulpen

== H ==
- Heineken, Zoeterwoude, Den Bosch
- Hertog Jan, Arcen

== I ==
- Brouwerij 't IJ, Amsterdam

== J ==
- Jopen, Haarlem

== K ==
- Brouwerij De Koningshoeven, Berkel-Enschot

== M ==
- Brouwerij De Molen, Bodegraven

== O ==
- Oranjeboom, Breda

== P ==
- Brouwerij de Prael, Amsterdam

== See also ==
- Beer and breweries by region
