= Clinge =

- Village
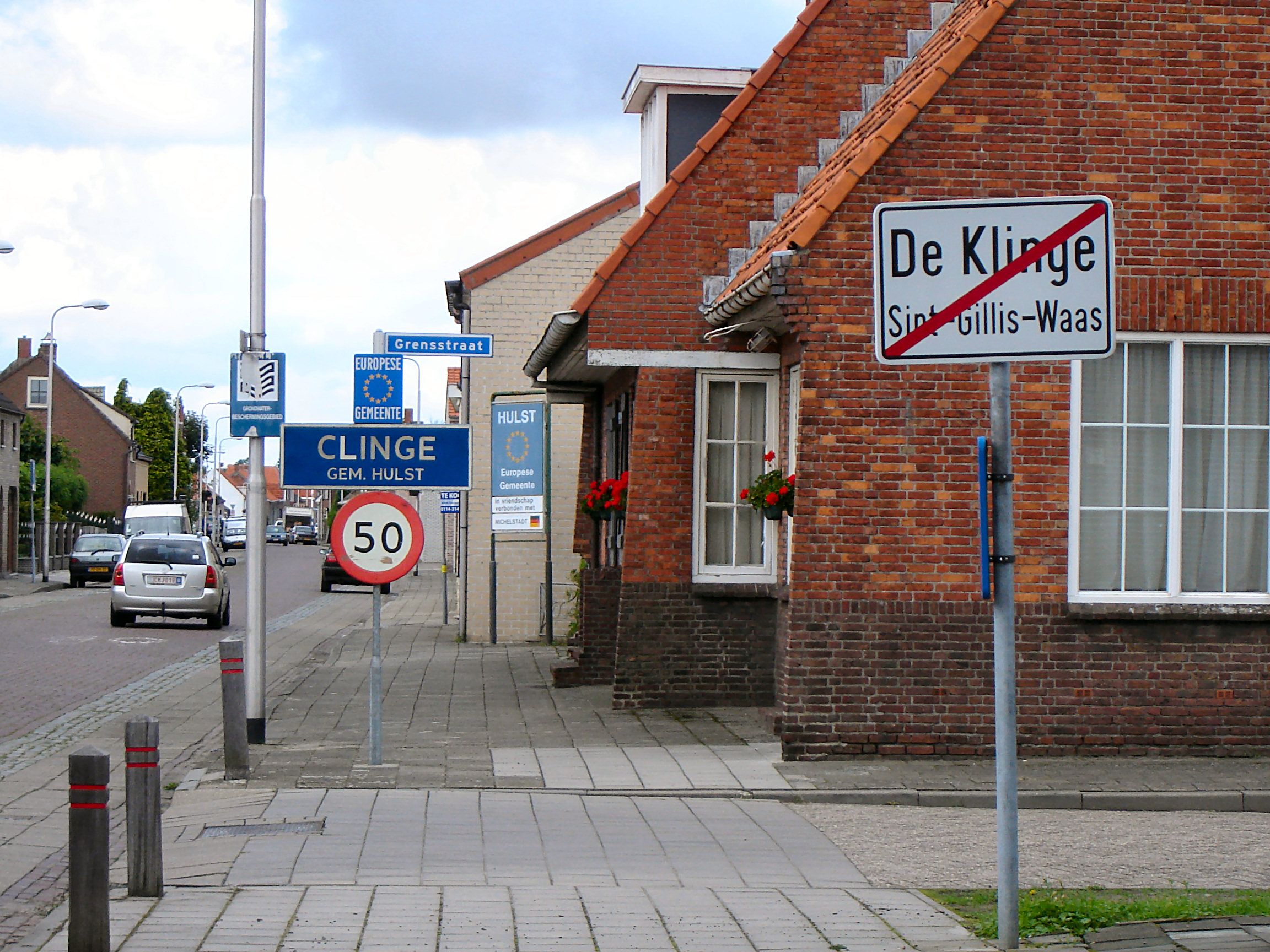
- Welcome to Clinge

- Flag Coat of arms

- Location in the province of Zeeland in the Netherlands Clinge (Netherlands)
- Coordinates: 51°16′14″N 4°5′17″E
- Country: Netherlands
- Province: Zeeland
- Municipality: Hulst

Area
  - Total: 13.92 km^{2} (5.37 sq mi)
- Elevation: 1.0 m (3.3 ft)

Population (2021)
  - Total: 2,350
  - Density: 169/km^{2} (437/sq mi)
- Time zone: UTC+1 (CET)
  - Summer (DST): UTC+2 (CEST)
- Postal code: 4567
- Dialing code: 0114

Clinge is a village in the Dutch province of Zeeland. It is a part of the municipality of Hulst, and lies about 28 km southwest of Bergen op Zoom. Clinge is located on the Dutch-Belgian border and joins with the Belgian town of De Klinge, in the Belgian municipality of Sint-Gillis-Waas. This border can normally be crossed freely.

== History ==
The village was first mentioned in the 13th century as die clinc, and means hill. Clinge is a linear settlement. The moorland was cultivated in the 13th century and poldered in 1616. In 1830, it was cut off from its Belgian part and became an independent parish in 1875.

The Catholic St Henricus Church was built in 1875 and is a three-aisled basilica like church. The tower was restored in 1973.

Clinge was home to 692 people in 1840. It was an independent municipality until 1970 when it was merged into Hulst.

== Gallery ==
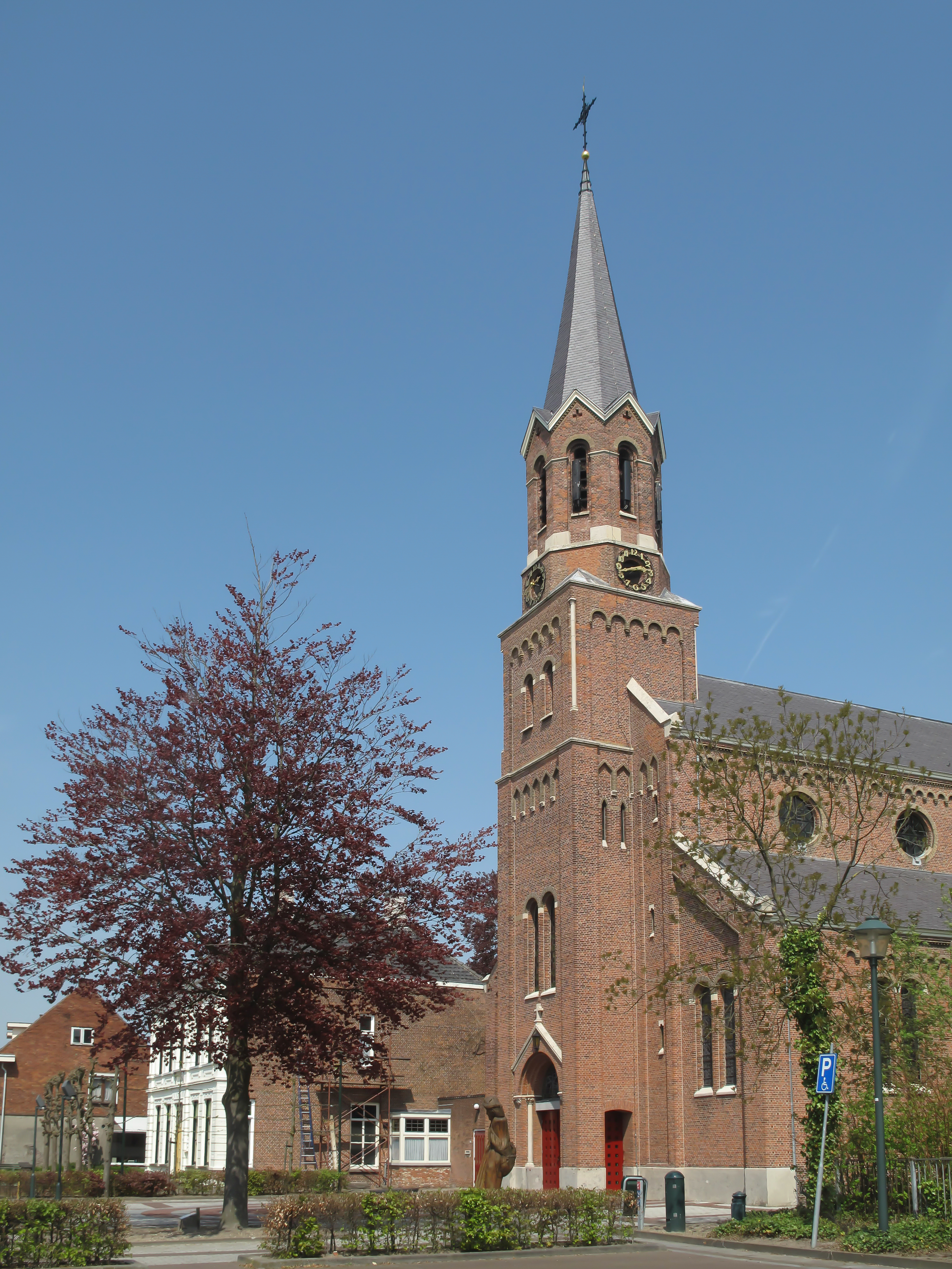
Clinge, church: de Heilige Henricuskerk

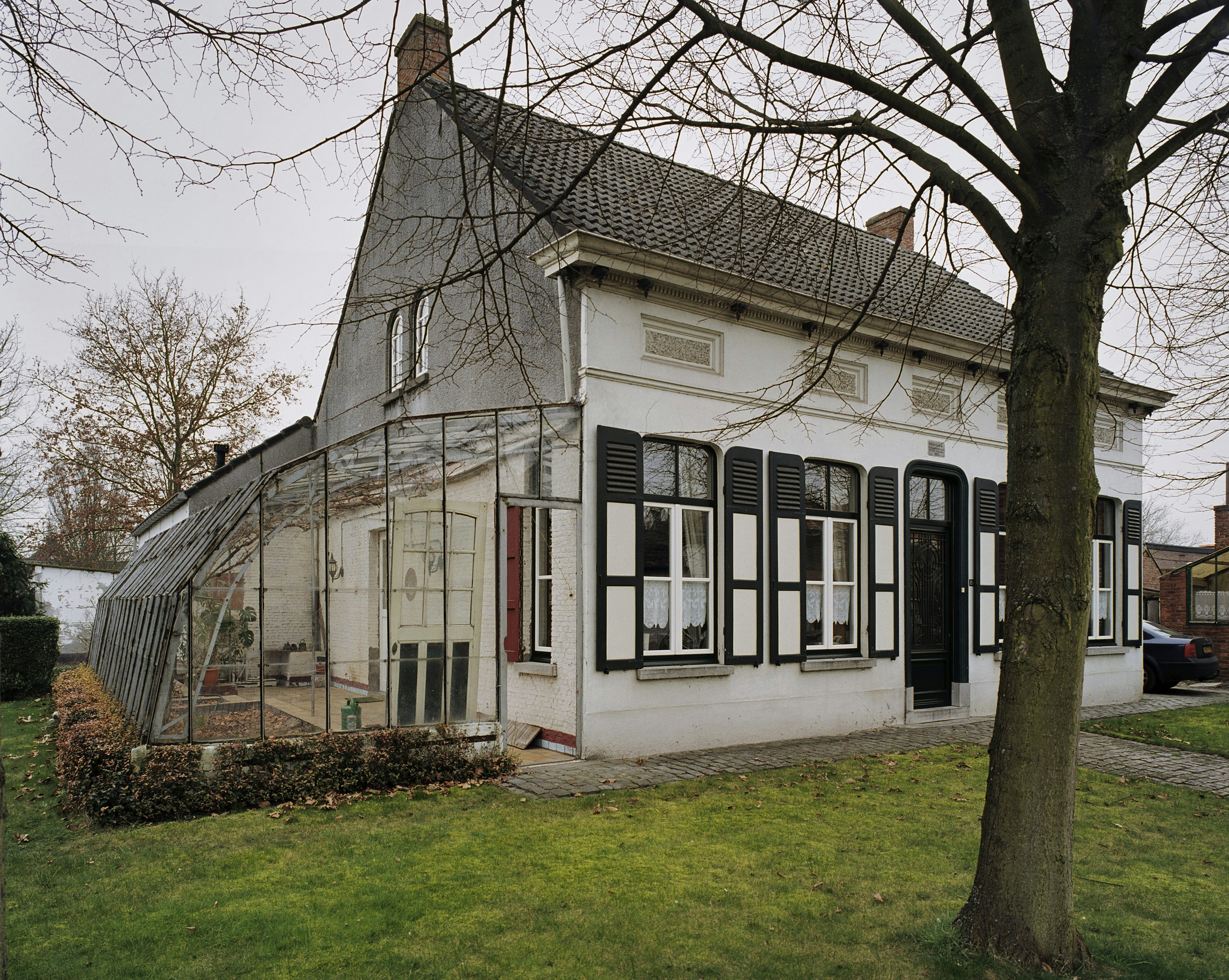
House

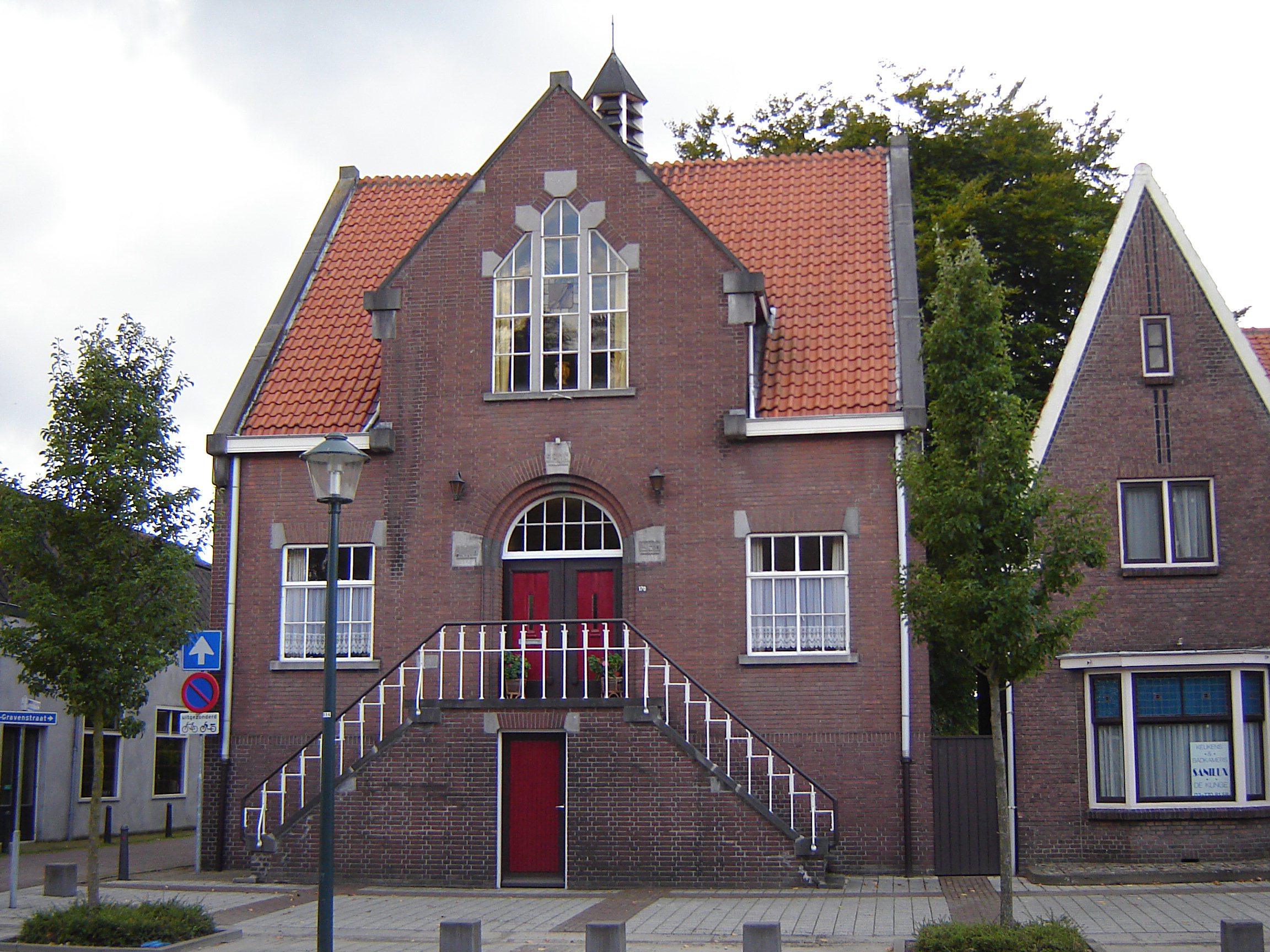
Former town hall
