= Brouwerij Van Steenberge =

Belgian brewery

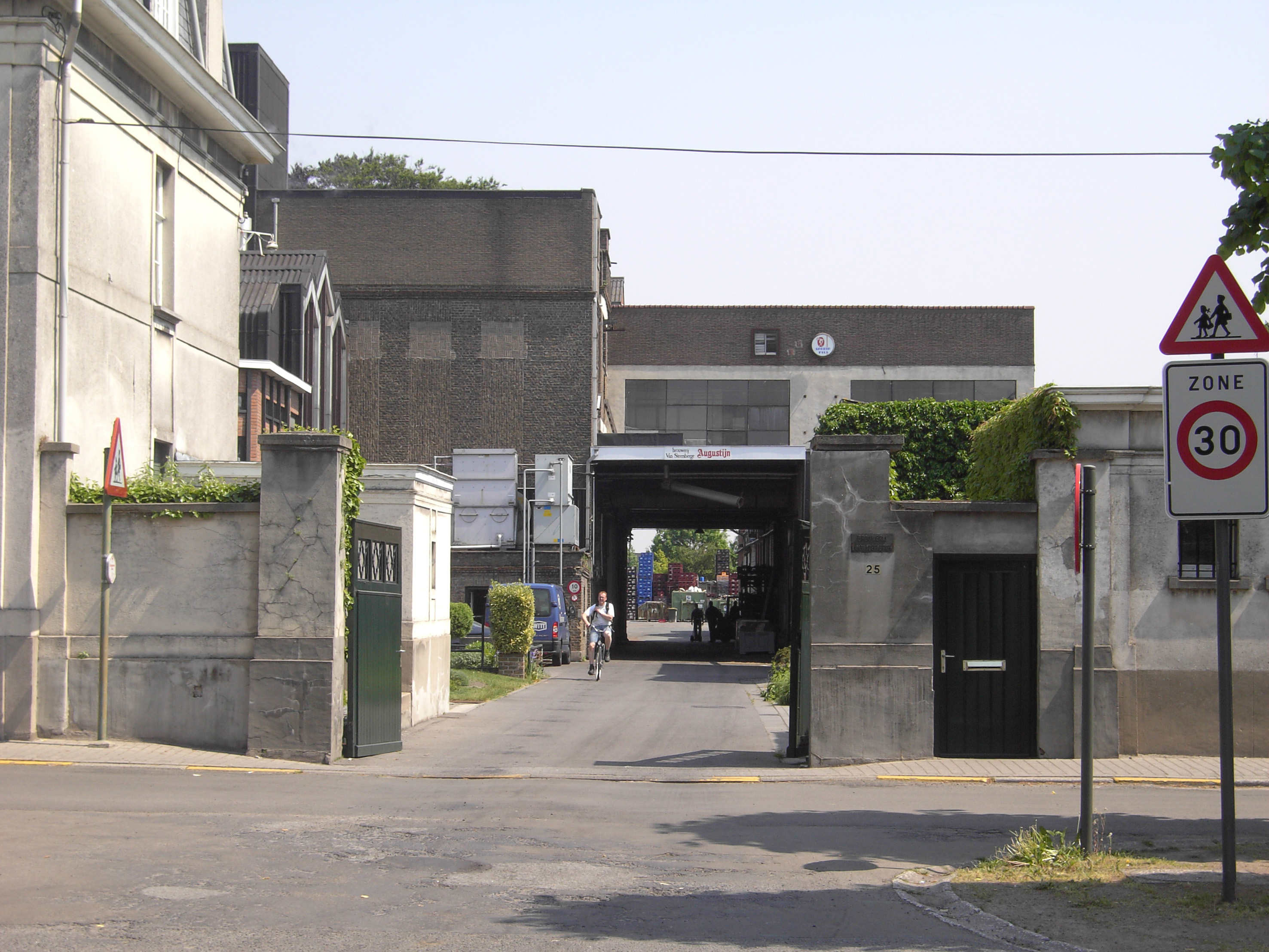
- Location: Ertvelde, East Flanders, Belgium
- Opened: 1784

Brouwerij Van Steenberge is a brewery in Ertvelde, East Flanders, Belgium. The brewery has been run by six generations of brewers since 1784.

== Beers ==
- Augustijn
  - Augustijn Blonde (7.0%)
  - Augustijn Dark (8.0%)
  - Augustijn Grand Cru (9.0%)
- Baptist
  - Baptist Blonde (5.0%)
  - Baptist IPA (6.7%)
  - Baptist Red (6.2%)
  - Baptist Saison (6.5%)
  - Baptist White (5.0%)
- Bornem
  - Bornem Blonde
  - Bornem Double (7.2%)
  - Bornem Triple (9.0%)
- Celis White
- Export 1784 (4.8%)
- Fourchette
  - Fourchette (7.0%)
  - Fourchette Grand Cru Vermouth (7.5%)
- Gentse Tripel (8.0%)
- Gulden Draak (Dutch for Gilded Dragon)
  - Gulden Draak 9000 Quadruple (10.5%)
  - Gulden Draak Blonde (8.0%)
  - Gulden Draak Brewmaster (10.5%)
  - Gulden Draak Classic (10.5%)
  - Gulden Draak Fire (10.5%)
  - Gulden Draak Imperial Blond (11.0%)
  - Gulden Draak Red (8.0%)
  - Gulden Draak Smoked (10.5%)
- Leute Bokbier
- Monk's
  - Monk's Café (5.5%)
  - Monk's Café Grand Cru (5.5%)
- Piraat
  - Piraat (10.5%)
  - Piraat 7 (7.0%)
  - Piraat Red (10.5%)
  - Piraat Triple Hop (10.5%)
- Principale Bruin
