= Brouwerij de Prael =

Dutch brewery

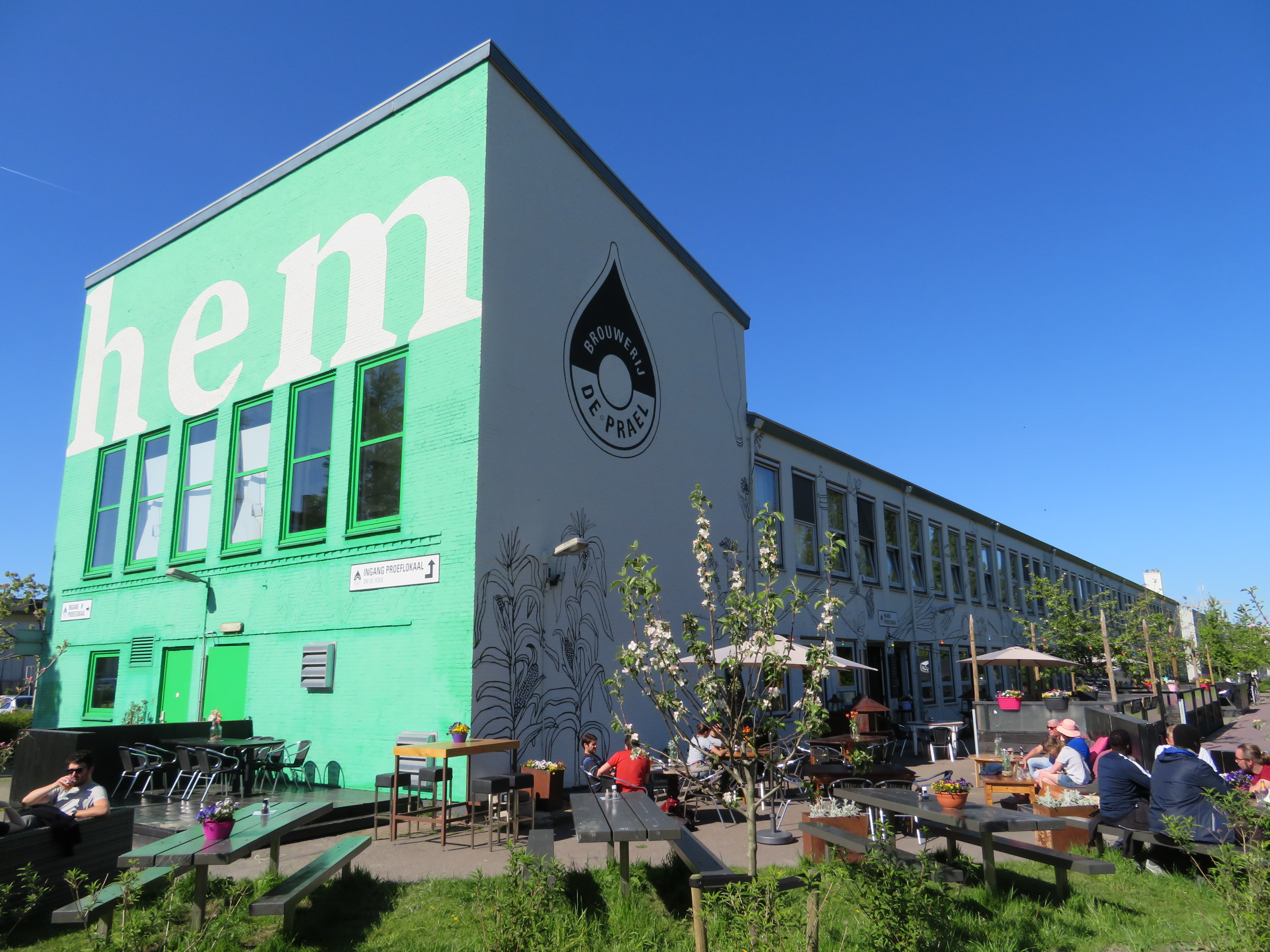
- Brouwerij de Prael
- Location: Amsterdam, North Holland, Netherlands
- Opened: 2002
- Key people: Arno Kooy Fer Kok
- Employees: 120
- Website: deprael.nl

Active beers
Name	Type
I.P.A.	India pale ale
Bitterblond	Kölsch
Weizen	Weizen
Tripel	Belgian tripel
New England Style	New England IPA
Milkstout	Milk stout
Barleywine	Barleywine

Brouwerij de Prael (Dutch pronunciation: [ˌbrʌuəˈrɛi də ˈpraːl]) is a Dutch brewery in Amsterdam. The brewery is a member of CRAFT. Brewery the Prael is located in the city center of Amsterdam.

== History ==
The brewery was established in 2002 by Arno Kooy and Fer Kok on the Schinkel business park outside the center of Amsterdam. Initially the brewery was called De Parel ('The Pearl'), but this name had to be changed at the behest of the Budelse Brouwerij, because it already made a beer called Parel. That is why the anagram De Prael ('The Pomp') was chosen.

In 2008 the brewery moved to the Oudezijds Armsteeg. A larger brewery was installed in that building to meet the increased demand. In 2011, a tasting room was also opened for the beers brewed on site.

The brewery has a beertasting room in the city center of Amsterdam, next to the brewery. There is also a branche in The Hague.

=== Social function ===
The brewery and tasting room employs people with disabilities who have difficulty finding work elsewhere. This means that the brewery has a social function. In 2002, Brouwerij De Prael was the first Dutch brewery to opt for this way of working, but the idea has now been followed, for example in Zaanstad at Brouwerij Breugem.

=== Folk music ===
The brewery's beers are named after famous Dutch folk singers, such as Johnny, Tante Leen and Willeke. A lot of Dutch-language music can also be heard in the tasting room.

== Beers ==
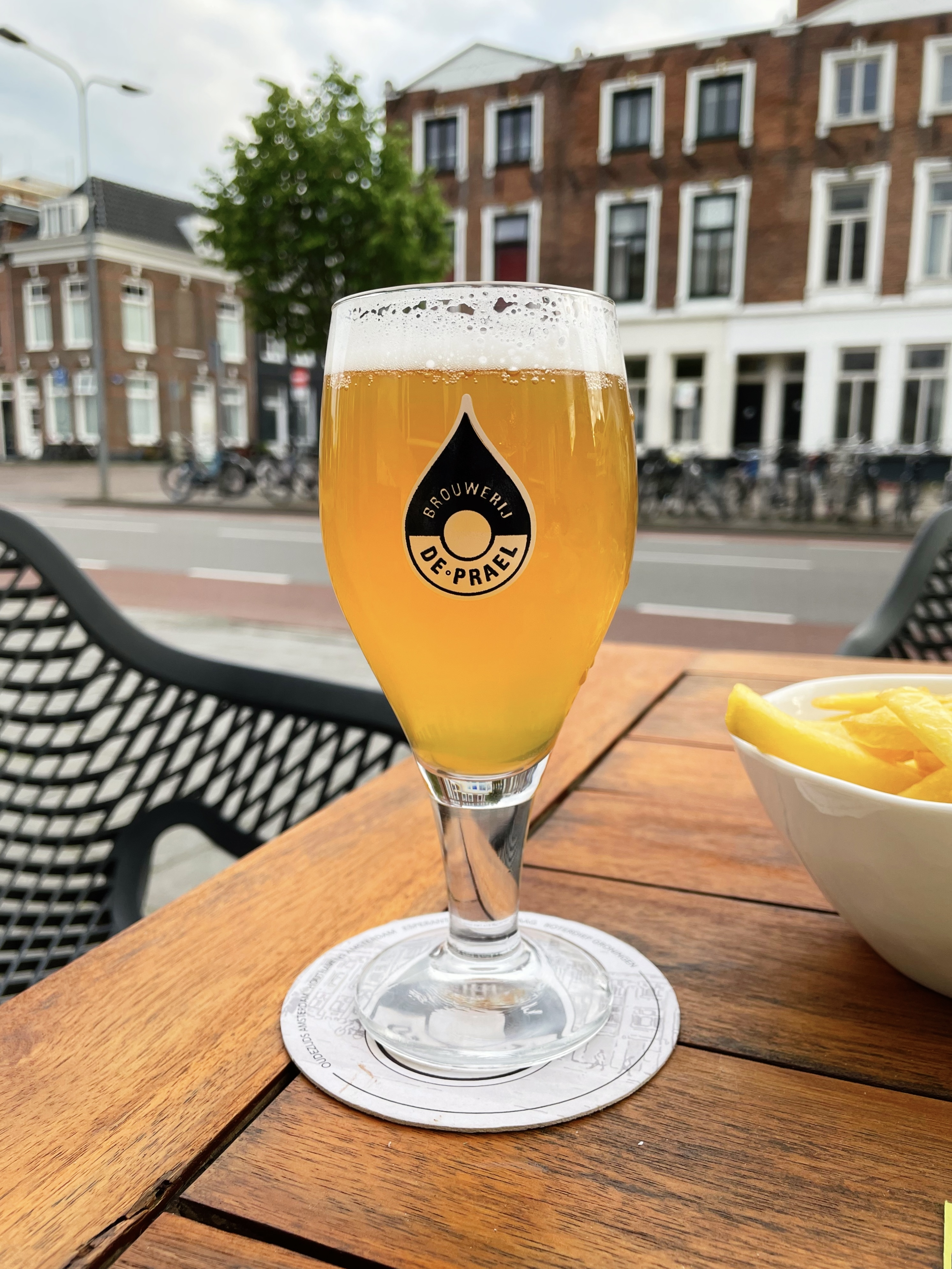
I.P.A. by Brouwerij de Prael

The relatively large range of beers varies in taste, color and alcohol percentage. The brewery not only brews Dutch and Belgian styles, but also German ones such as Kölsch. There are also seasonal beers.

In addition, brewing is also done on behalf of others, so-called gypsy brewers.

== See also ==
- Beer in the Netherlands
- List of Dutch breweries
