= Gulden Draak =

Belgian beer

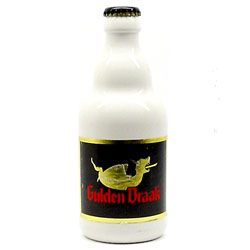
- Gulden Draak 33cl bottle of Gulden Draak
- Manufacturer: Brouwerij Van Steenberge
- Alcohol by volume: 10.5%
- Style: Dark triple ale
- Website: www.vansteenberge.com/nl/onze-bieren/gulden-draak/

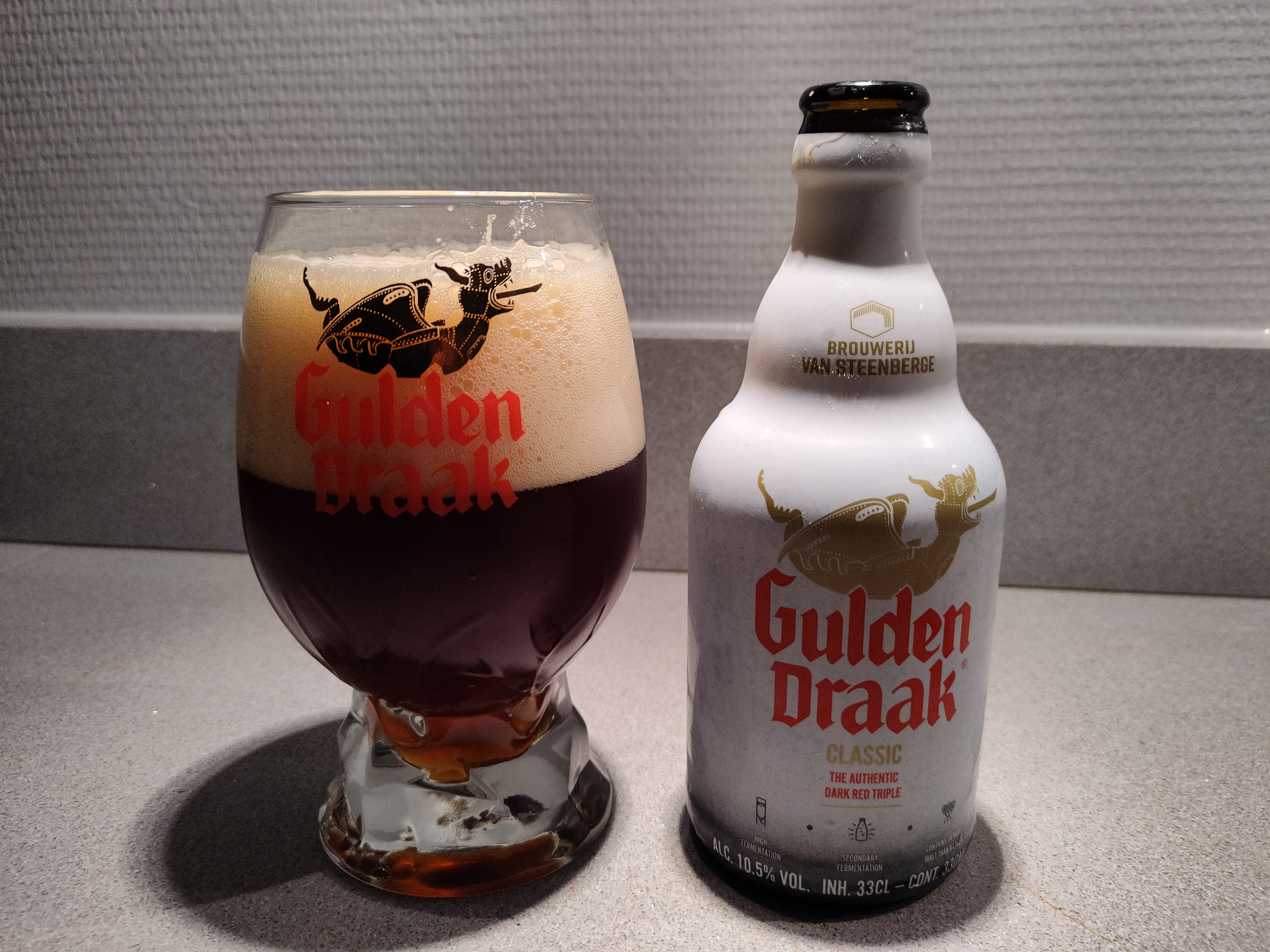

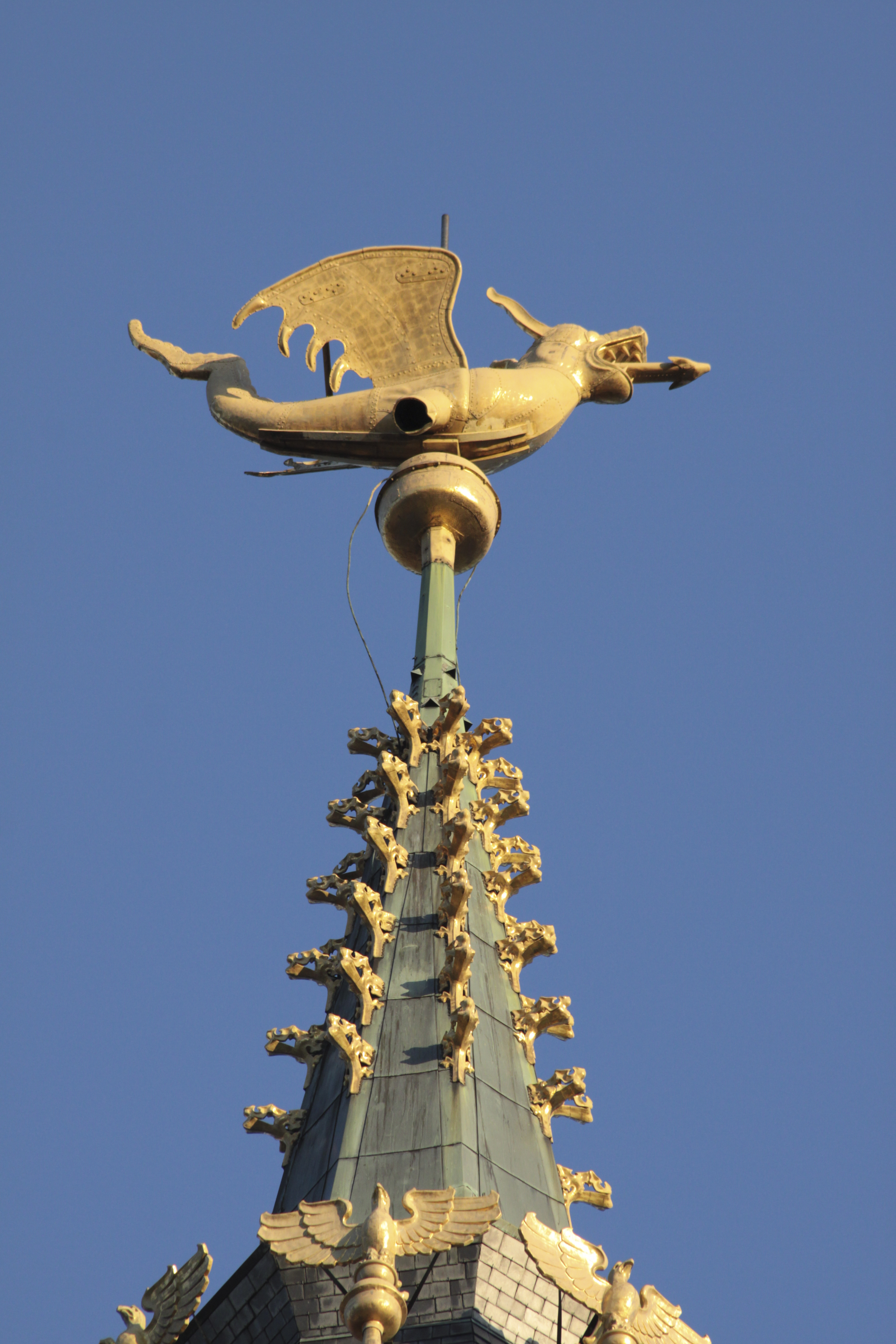
Gulden Draak is named after the golden dragon at the top of the belfry of Ghent.

Gulden Draak (Dutch for Golden Dragon) is a dark Belgian beer with high alcohol by volume (10.5%), brewed by Brouwerij Van Steenberge in Ertvelde, East Flanders. It is named after the golden dragon at the top of the belfry in Ghent.

== Aroma and taste ==
Gulden Draak has a strong scent of alcohol, which hampers the ability to easily define its aroma. Still, there is a powerful fragrance of barley, ripe plums, and cherries. Different testers worldwide mention a sweet coffee aroma. Compared to the aroma, the taste is influenced somewhat less by the alcohol. It hints at sour cherries and brown sugar. The aftertaste is somewhat bitter. Gulden Draak also has a high alcohol content for a beer at 10.5%. Gulden Draak was awarded the best-tasting beer in the world in 1998 by the American Tasting Institute (now ChefsBest).

== Color ==
Dark with caramel-colored foam head.

== Process ==
Akin to the other special beers of the Brewery Van Steenberge, Gulden Draak is a high fermentation beer with secondary fermentation. For the secondary fermentation, a wine yeast is used. Fermentation happens both in the bottle as in the barrel, which ensures a preservation for years.

== Packaging ==
Gulden Draak is packaged in 33, 75, and 150 centilitre glass bottles enveloped in white plastic, and in kegs of 30 litres.

== Variations ==
The 10.5% abv Gulden Draak 9000 Quadruple is a pale quadrupel variant of the dark brown Gulden Draak. It is named after the postal code (9000) of the city of Ghent, Belgium. Three different kinds of malt are used in brewing; for secondary fermentation a wine yeast is used. Gulden Draak is packaged in a black plastic enveloped bottle in volumes of 33, 75, and 150 centilitre, and in kegs of 30 litres.

There is also Gulden Draak The Brewmasters Edition, where the regular Gulden Draak is left for a period in a used whiskey barrel. In addition, there is a 7.5% abv Gulden Draak Vintage.
