= Beer in the Netherlands =

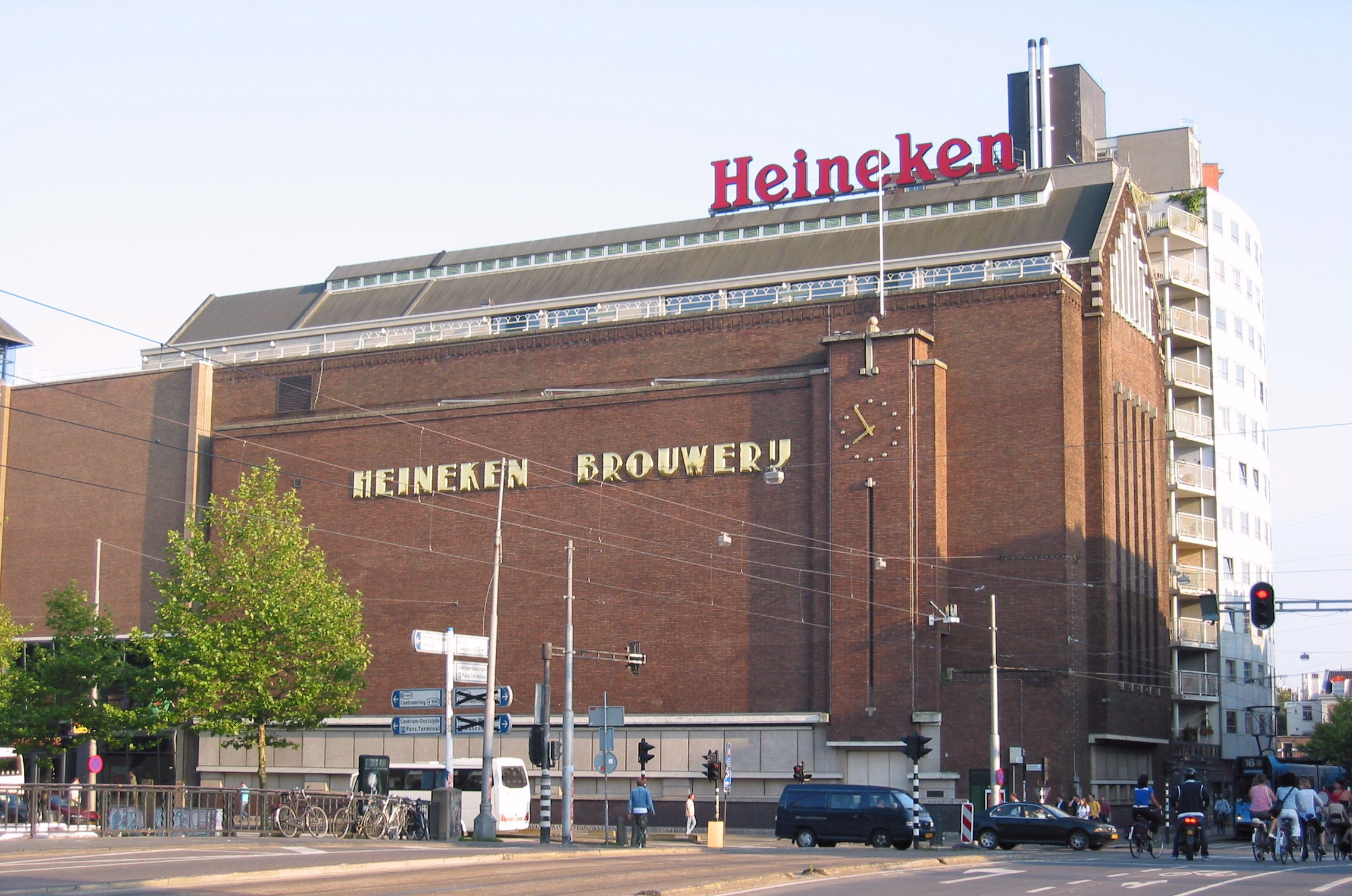
The former Heineken brewery in Amsterdam, now a museum

Beer in the Netherlands mostly comprises pale lagers like Heineken and Grolsch. Heineken is the world's second-largest brewer.

While pale lager makes up the majority of beer in the Netherlands, Dutch brewers also produce witbier (wheat beer) and Bok, closely related to German Bock.

The Netherlands exports the most beer of any country in the world – approximately 50% of production. In 2004, almost 1,300 million litres were exported out of a total production of 2,300 million litres.

== Breweries ==
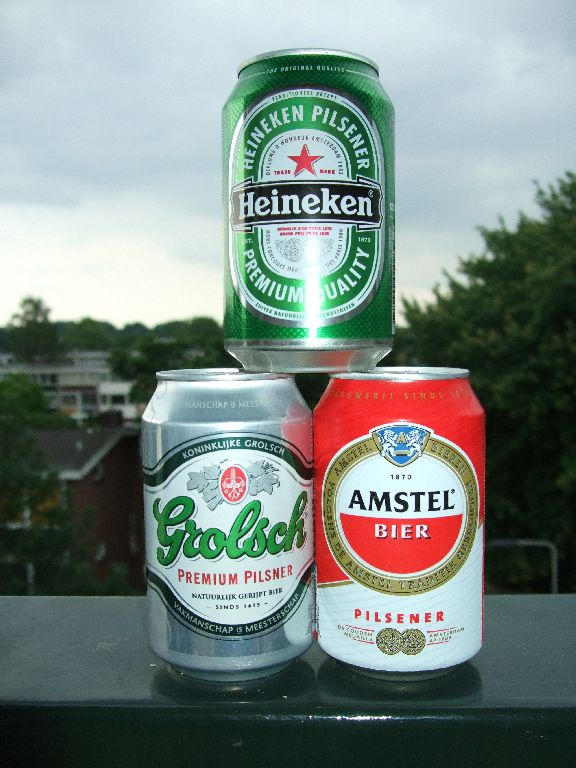
Amstel, Grolsch and Heineken – three popular Dutch brands

There are three major brewery companies in the Netherlands: Heineken (also brews Amstel), Grolsch, and Bavaria. Belgian breweries also take part in the market. Inbev for example sells Jupiler in the Dutch market. According to the Centraal Brouwerij Kantoor, Heineken controls about fifty percent of the market and the other three fifteen percent each. Between them, the large companies operate eight breweries. In addition to the multinationals, there are five independent lager breweries and around forty five small, new microbreweries and brewpubs. A dozen other companies own no brewing plant themselves and have their beers brewed by third parties in the Netherlands or Belgium. The new breweries mostly brew top-fermenting beers roughly similar to those from Belgium. In addition there are also examples of British-style ales and traditional lagers.

The Dutch province, North Brabant, is home to two of the ten Trappist Breweries. The monks that run the Koningshoeven Brewery in Berkel-Enschot brew several beers, mostly branded La Trappe, and has been active since 1884, while the De Kievit brewery of the Zundert abbey was only founded in 2013 and brews a beer named Zundert. The four classics La Trappe Trappist beers are awarded with Golden European Beer stars in 2018. La Trappe Blond won a Golden award in the World Beer Cup 2016. It was chosen as winner out of 6600 other international beers.

Some beers have their own regional consumption base. Bavaria, Budels and Dommelsch are popular in North Brabant. Grolsch is a favourite in the eastern province Overijssel.

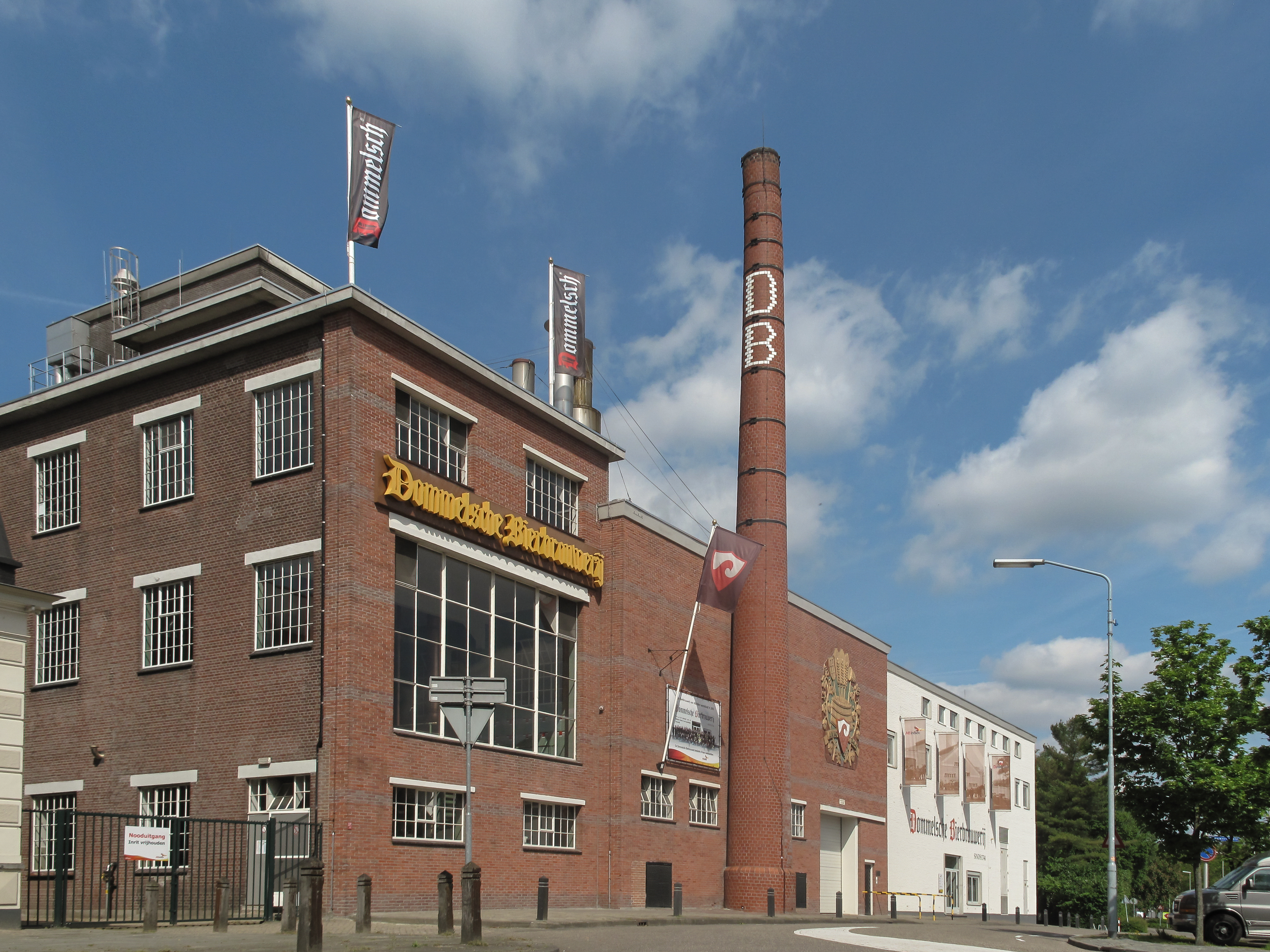
Dommelsch Beer Brewery, The Oldest Dutch Brewery

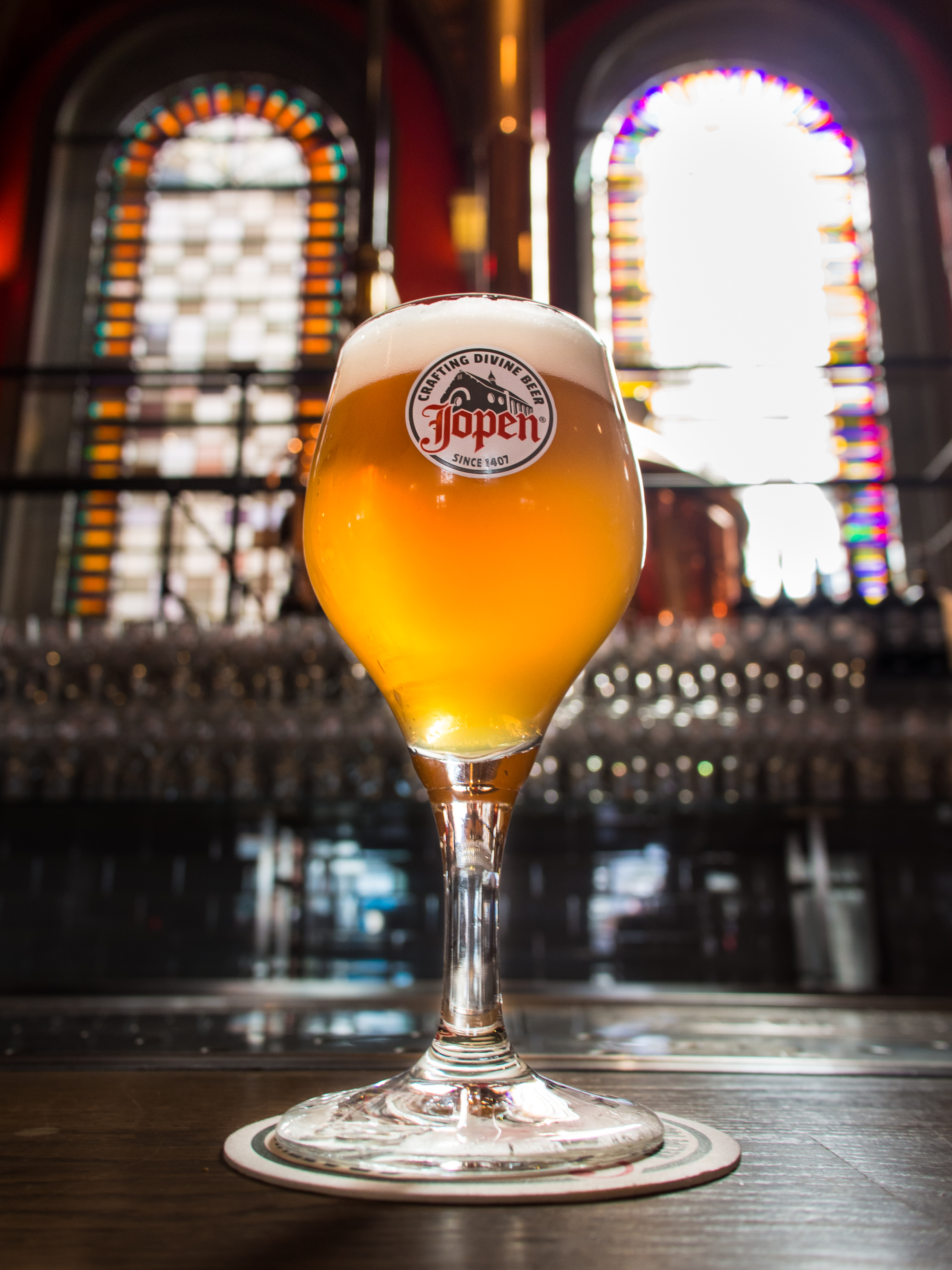
Lentebier from Dutch brewery Jopen

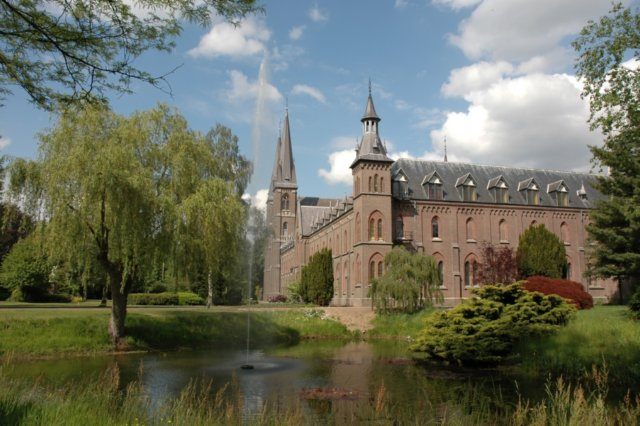
Visit the La Trappe Brewery in the Abbey De Koningshoeven surrounded by Brabantian nature

== See also ==
- List of Dutch breweries
