= Dommelen =

- Town
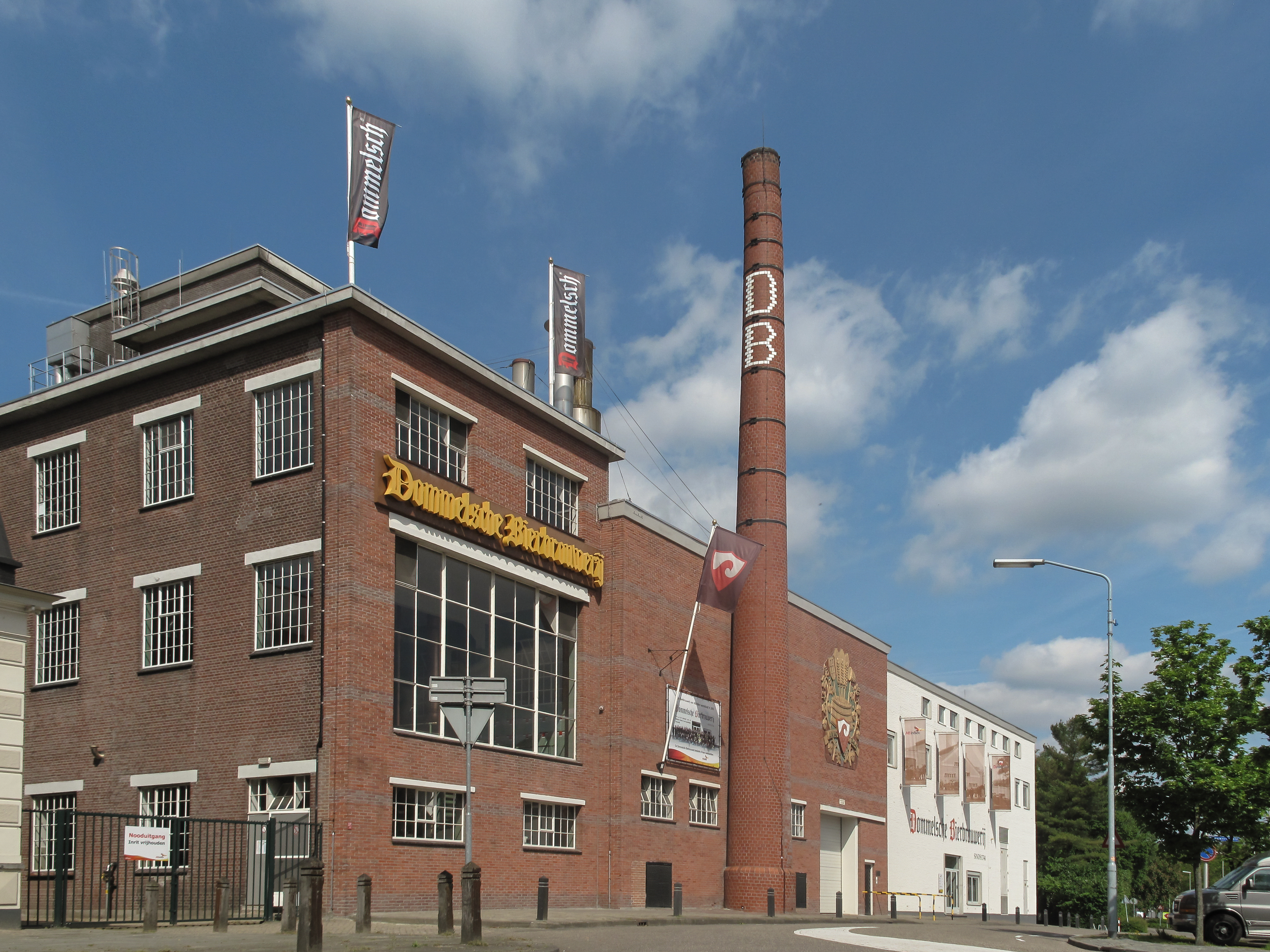
- Brewery Dommelsch

- Location in the province of North Brabant in the Netherlands Dommelen (Netherlands)
- Coordinates: 51°21′25″N 5°25′50″E
- Country: Netherlands
- Province: North Brabant
- Municipality: Valkenswaard

Area
  - Total: 4.23 km^{2} (1.63 sq mi)
- Elevation: 25 m (82 ft)

Population (2021)
  - Total: 9,350
  - Density: 2,210/km^{2} (5,720/sq mi)
- Time zone: UTC+1 (CET)
  - Summer (DST): UTC+2 (CEST)
- Postal code: 5551
- Dialing code: 040

Dommelen is a village in southern Netherlands. It is located in the municipality of Valkenswaard, North Brabant. Dommelen derives its name from the little brook Dommel that runs through it. Having its clear water close at hand, Dommelen is mostly known for its beer brewery from which the brand name Dommelsch is derived. Its other main attraction is an old watermill.

Dommelen was a separate municipality until 1934, when it was merged with Valkenswaard.

The spoken language is Kempenlands (an East Brabantian dialect, which is very similar to colloquial Dutch).

== History ==
The village was first mentioned in 1297 as Dumellam, and means "settlement on the Dommel". The etymology of the river is unknown.

The Catholic St Martin Church was built in 1882 and 1883 in Gothic Revival style with a built-in tower. It was enlarged between 1929 and 1930.

Dommelen was home to 347 people in 1840. It was an independent municipality until 1934, when it was annexed by Valkenswaard. Dommelen remained a village until the 1970s, when new neighbourhoods were added.

== Sport ==
RKVV Dommelen is an amateur football club in Dommelen. It was founded in 1942. The club's first team plays on Sundays in the fourth division of Dutch amateur football (season 2012/2013). The club plays at Sportpark 't Heike in Dommelen.
