= Sint-Gillis-Waas =

- Municipality
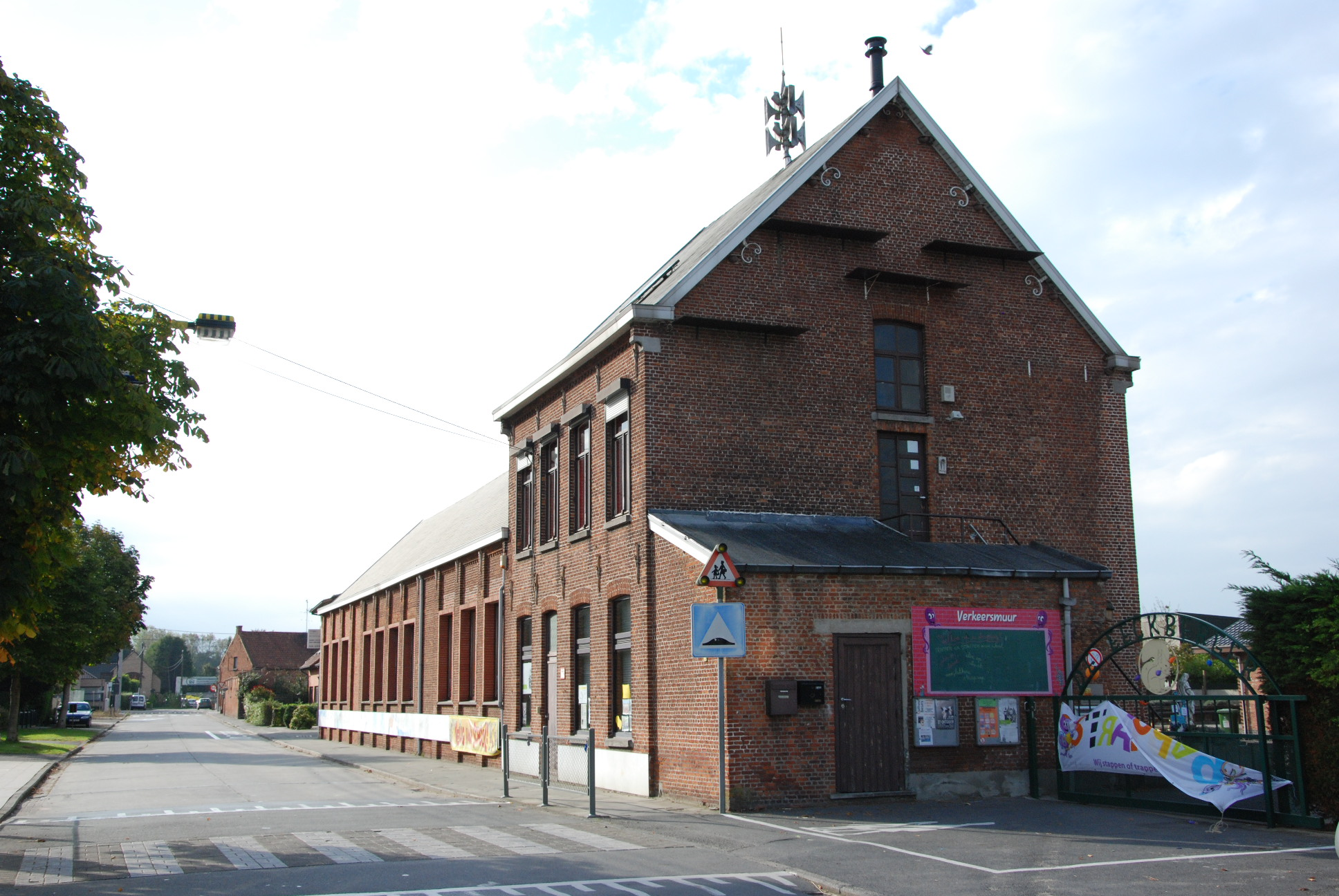

- Flag Coat of arms

- Location of Sint-Gillis-Waas in East Flanders
- Interactive map of Sint-Gillis-Waas
- Location in Belgium
- Coordinates: 51°13′N 04°07′E
- Country: Belgium
- Community: Flemish Community
- Region: Flemish Region
- Province: East Flanders
- Arrondissement: Sint-Niklaas

Government
  - Mayor: Maaike De Ridder (CD&V)
  - Governing parties: CD&V, Groen-Vooruit

Area
  - Total: 55.49 km^{2} (21.42 sq mi)

Population (2018-01-01)
  - Total: 19,273
  - Density: 347.3/km^{2} (899.6/sq mi)
- Postal codes: 9170
- NIS code: 46020
- Area codes: 03
- Website: www.sint-gillis-waas.be

Sint-Gillis-Waas (Dutch pronunciation: [sɪnt ˌxɪlɪs ˈʋaːs]; (Note: In isolation, Gillis is pronounced [ˈɣɪlɪs].) French: Saint-Gilles-Waes) is a municipality located in the Belgian province of East Flanders. The municipality comprises the towns of De Klinge, Meerdonk, Sint-Gillis-Waas proper and Sint-Pauwels. On 1 January 2018, Sint-Gillis-Waas had a total population of 19,273. The total area is 54.98 km^{2} which gives a population density of 357 inhabitants per km^{2}.
