= Jopen =

Dutch beer and brewery

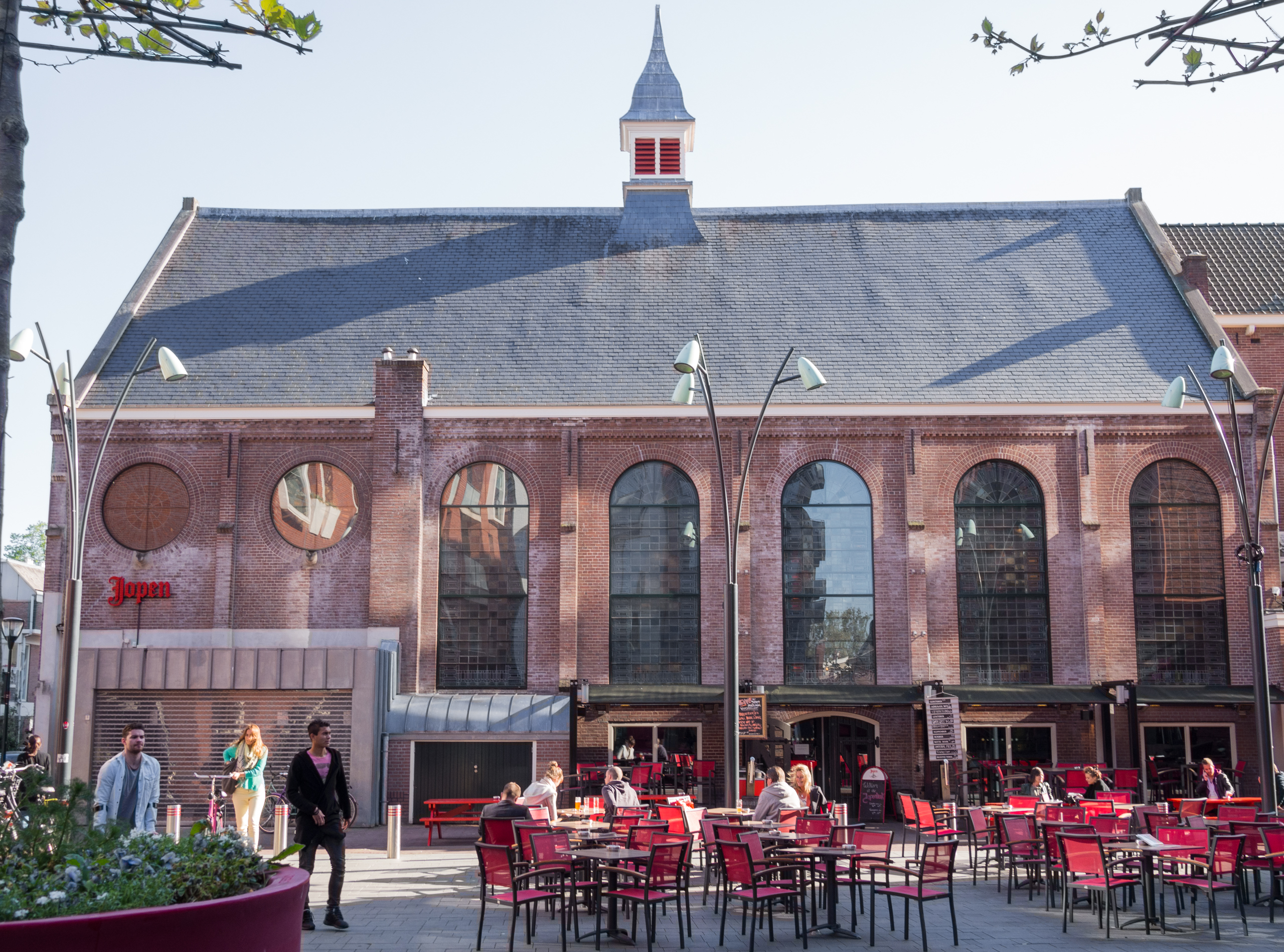
The Jopen brewery is housed in a former church in Haarlem

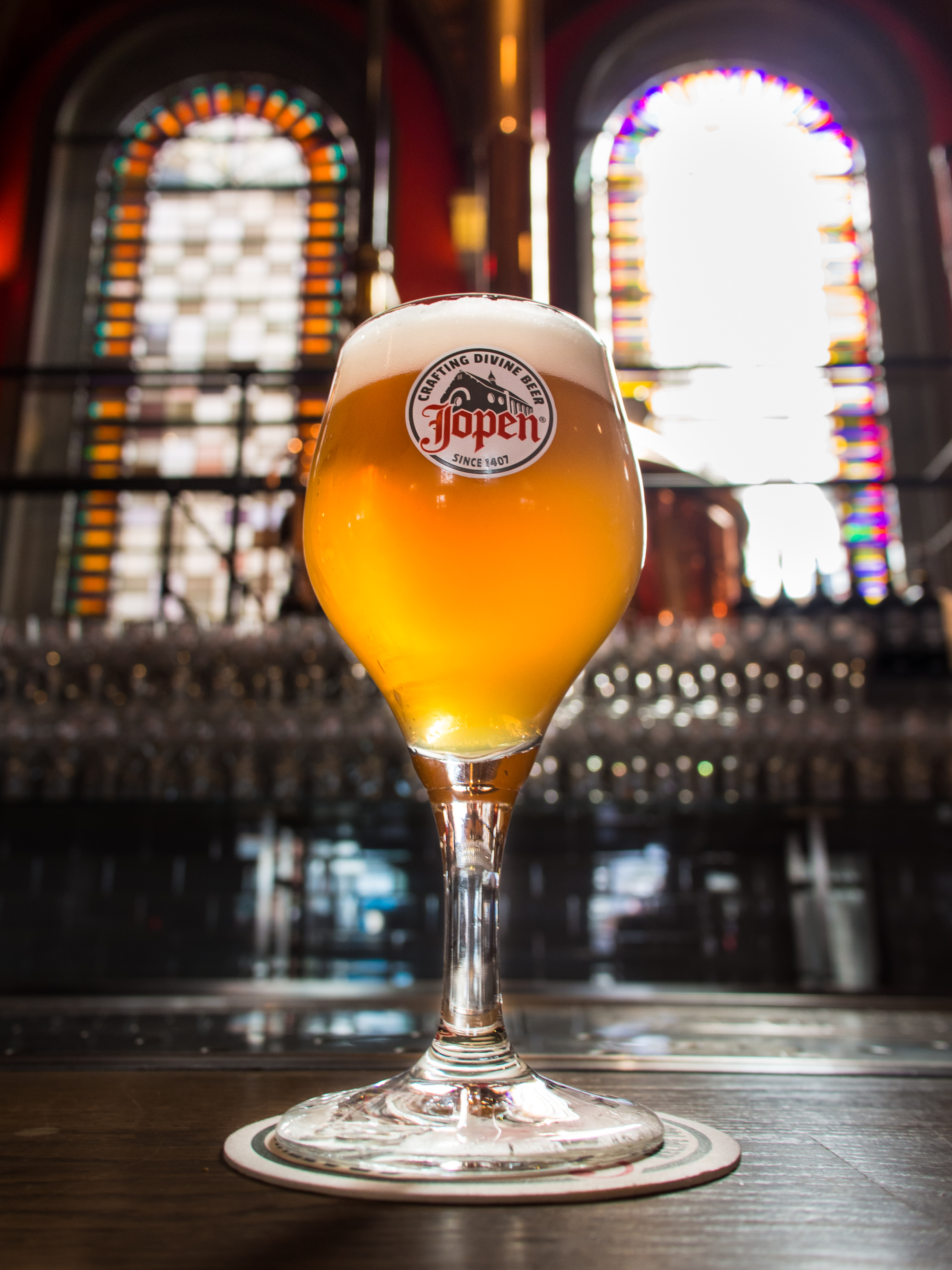
Jopen Lentebier ("Springtime beer") is a top-cropped beer of 7%; at the Jopenkerk brewery

Jopen (Dutch pronunciation: [ˈjoːpə(n)]) is a beer brewery from Haarlem, Netherlands. Jopen's beer is the product of the Stichting Haarlems Biergenootschap (lit. 'Beer society'), established in 1992. The Biergenootschap aims to revive traditional Haarlem beers and introduce them to the commercial market. Two recipes discovered in the Haarlem city archives served as the basis for the first two beers. The first one was a recipe from 1407; the recreation of this was named Koyt, a gruit beer.

In December 1996, the commercial company Jopen BV acquired the beer. The name Jopen refers to the 112 litre beer barrels that were used in early times to transport the Haarlem beer. Until the end of 1996 Jopen beer was brewed in the Halve Maan brewery in Hulst, after that it was made in the La Trappe brewery in Berkel-Enschot. Since 2001, the Jopen beer brands were brewed in Ertvelde, Belgium, in brewery Van Steenberge. The current brewer is Chris Wisse. At the end of 2005, it was announced that the old Jacobskerk, in the Raaks area in the city centre of Haarlem, would be transformed into a brewery. On November 11, 2010, the "Jopenkerk" (Jopen church) opened its doors for the public. Besides the brewery it also hosts a café and restaurant. Jopen won two silver medals at the 2008 World Beer Championship.

== Beers ==
- Jopen Hoppen (Historical hopped beer (recipe from 1501), 6.8% ABV)
- Jopen Koyt (Historical beer with Gruit (recipe from 1407), 8.5% ABV)
- Adriaan (Wheat beer, 5.0% ABV)
- 4 Granen Bok (Autumn bock made from 4 types of grain, 6.5% ABV)
- Lentebier (Springtime beer, 7.0% ABV)
- Extra Stout (Stout, 5.5% ABV)
- Gerstebier (Blond beer, 4.5% ABV)
- Johannieter (Double bock, 9.0% ABV)
- Trinitas Tripel (Tripel, 9.0% ABV)
- Ongelovige Thomas (Imperial Quadrupel, 10.0% ABV)
- Jacobus RPA (Rye pale ale, 5.3% ABV)
