= Dommelsch Brewery =

Dutch brewery

Dommelsch Brewery (Dommelsche Bierbrouwerij)
- Industry: Alcoholic beverage
- Founded: 1744
- Headquarters: Netherlands
- Products: Beer
- Parent: Anheuser–Busch InBev
- Website: http://www.dommelsch.nl

Dommelsch Brewery is a brewery founded in 1744 in the village of Dommelen, Netherlands. It is part of the Anheuser-Busch InBev group, and brews Dommelsch Pilsener for the Dutch market.

== History ==
Dommelsch was founded in 1744 in the village of Dommelen, Netherlands. It was taken over by Brouwerij Artois in 1968, who later became Interbrew, and then part of the Anheuser-Busch InBev group in 2008.

Besides Dommelsch the brewery also makes Hertog Jan, Jupiler, Leffe and Brahma.

== Brewery ==
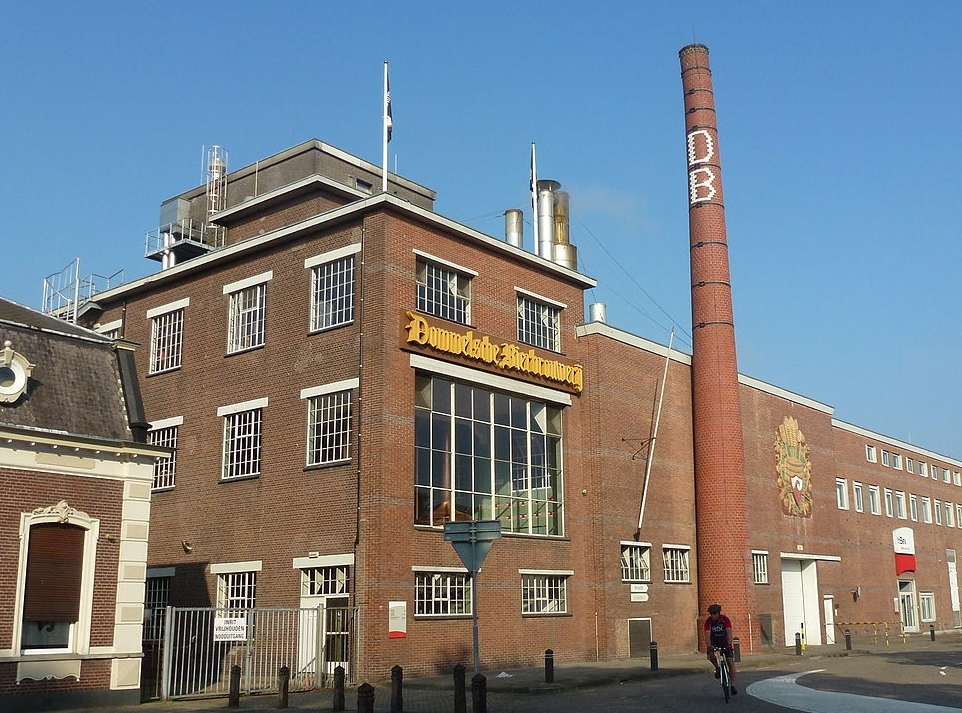
The Dommelsch Brewery

The Dommelsch Brewery building is in Dommelen, Netherlands. It was built in 1744.

== Brands ==
It brews its own brand Dommelsch Pilsener, a 5% abv pale lager, for the Dutch market, and the global brand Brahma beer for the European market.
