= Ertvelde =

- Village
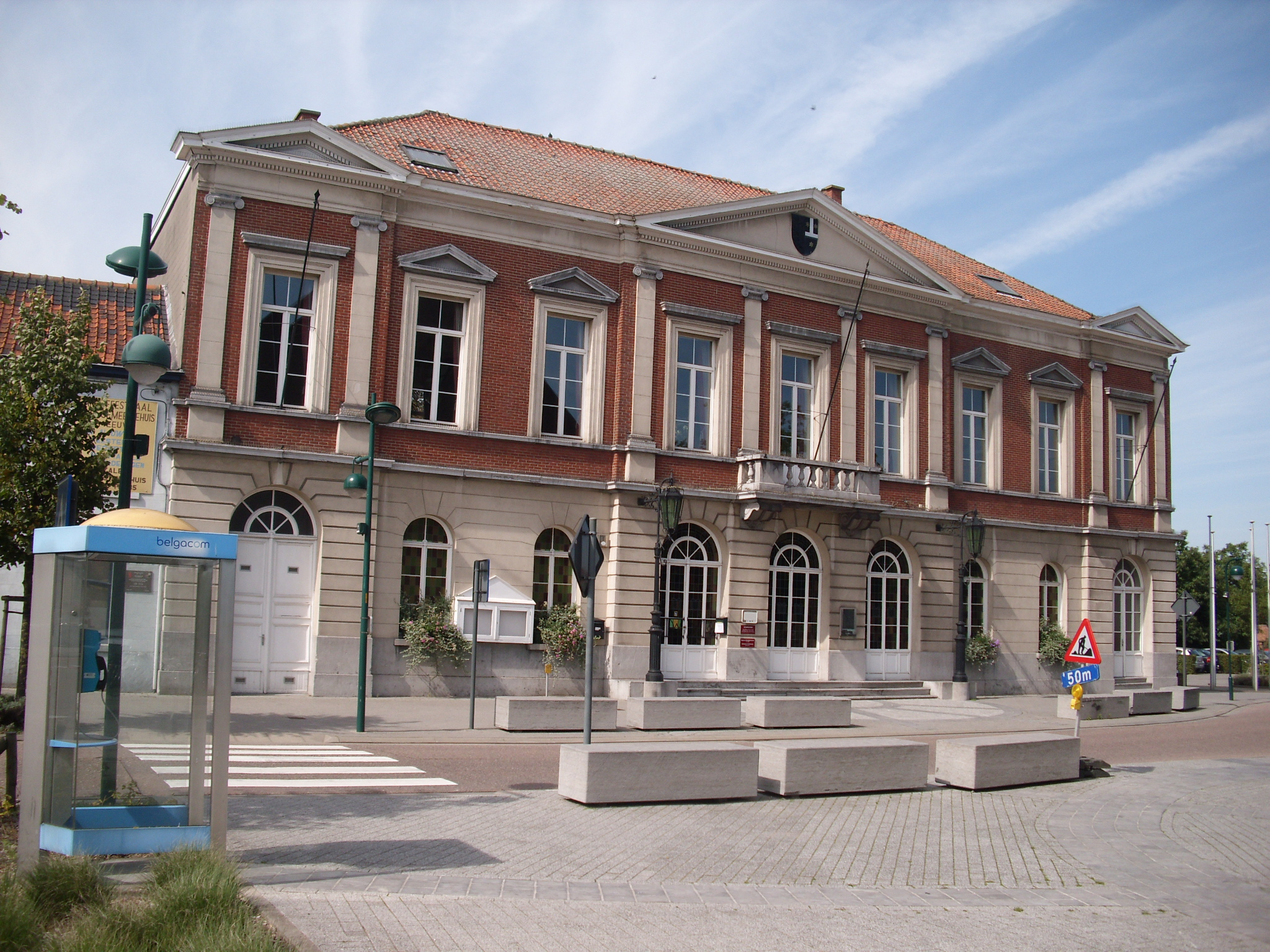
- Former townhall

- Location in Belgium
- Coordinates: 51°10′42″N 3°44′41″E
- Country: Belgium
- Region: Flemish Region
- Province: East Flanders
- Municipality: Evergem

Area
  - Total: 23.32 km^{2} (9.00 sq mi)

Population (2021)
  - Total: 10,503
  - Density: 450.4/km^{2} (1,166/sq mi)
- Time zone: CET

Ertvelde is a village of the Belgian municipality of Evergem. Eddy Wally used to have his legendary show venue in the village-centre, called "Paris, Las Vegas".

The Brouwerij Van Steenberge is located in Ertvelde. The brewery produces Gulden Draak, a strong tripel ale.

You can also find historical things, like the 'Mottekasteel' and a collection of materials used in WWI at the (old) local government. The church is rebuilt after it was broken down by the Germans in WWII.'

They renovated a large part of the 'Motte castle Hoge Wal', now you can have a view over the 'Hoge Wal'. The 'Hoge Wal' is a park with a Finnish path.

== History ==
The village was first mentioned in 1167 as Artevelde. It was originally road village in an infertile wilderness. The burgraves of Ertvelde used to have a motte-and-bailey castle since at least the 12th century. The castle was destroyed in 1385 during the Revolt of Ghent. The village continued to be plagued by war until the early 18th century. During the 19th century, Ertvelde started to industrialise and become a trade centre due to its location along the Ghent–Terneuzen Canal. The town and surrounding villages were severely damaged and bombed both in 1940 and 1944.

== Gallery ==
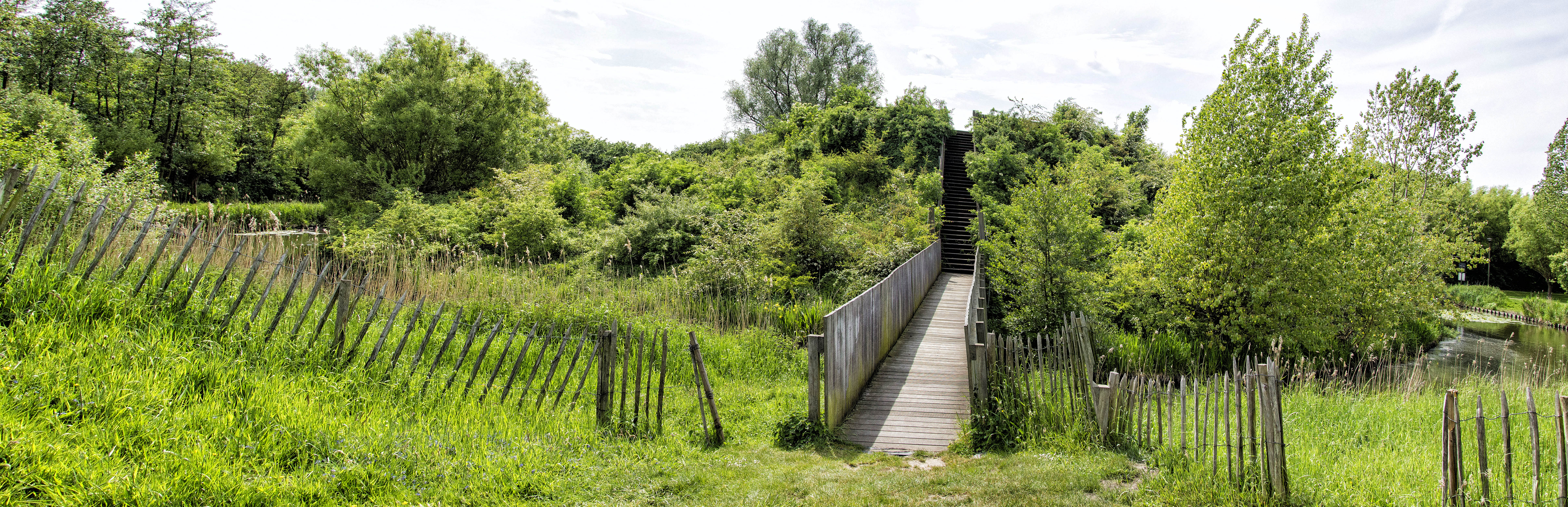
Motte-and-bailey castle Hoge Wal

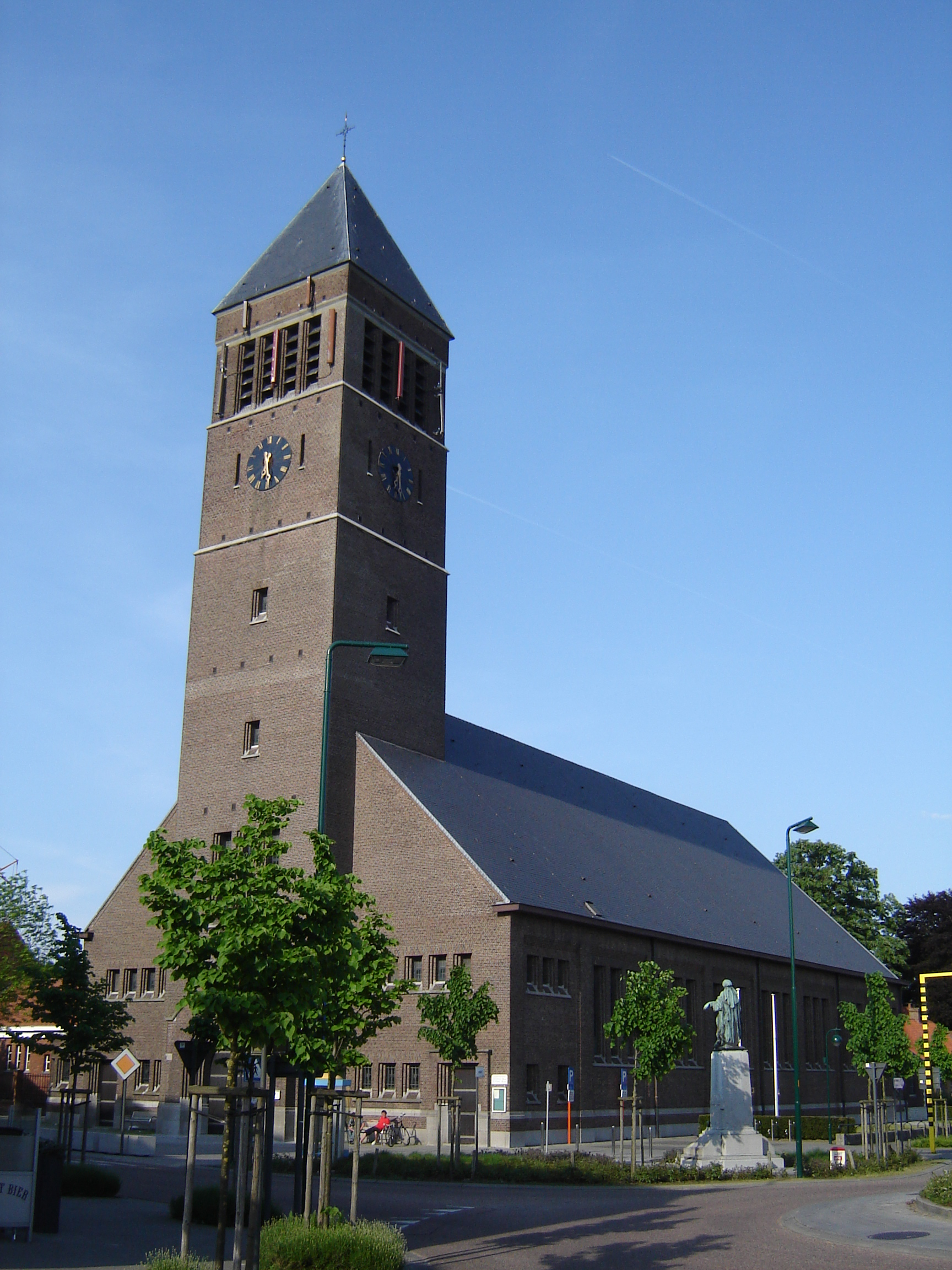
Assumption of Mary Church

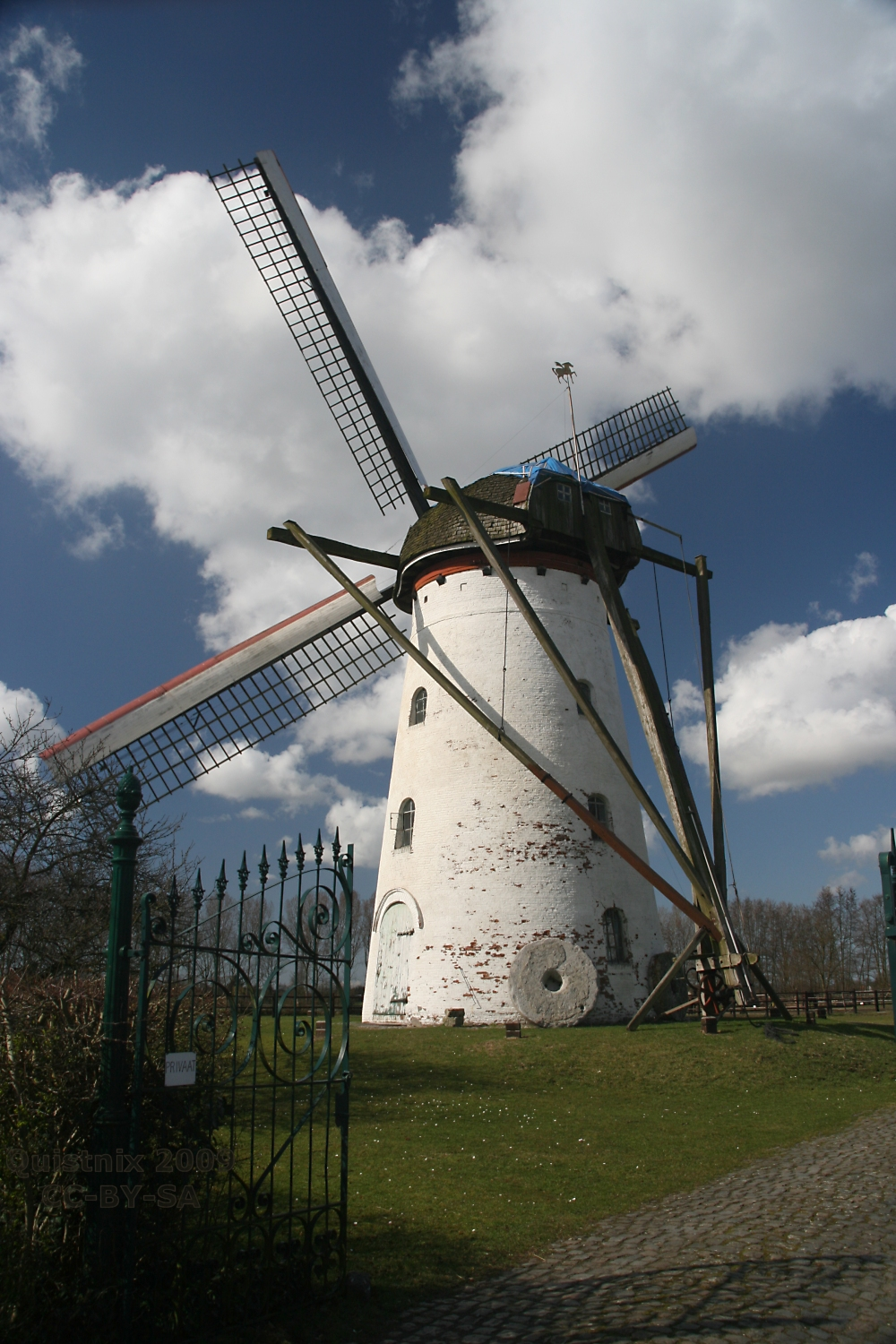
Windmill Stenen Molen

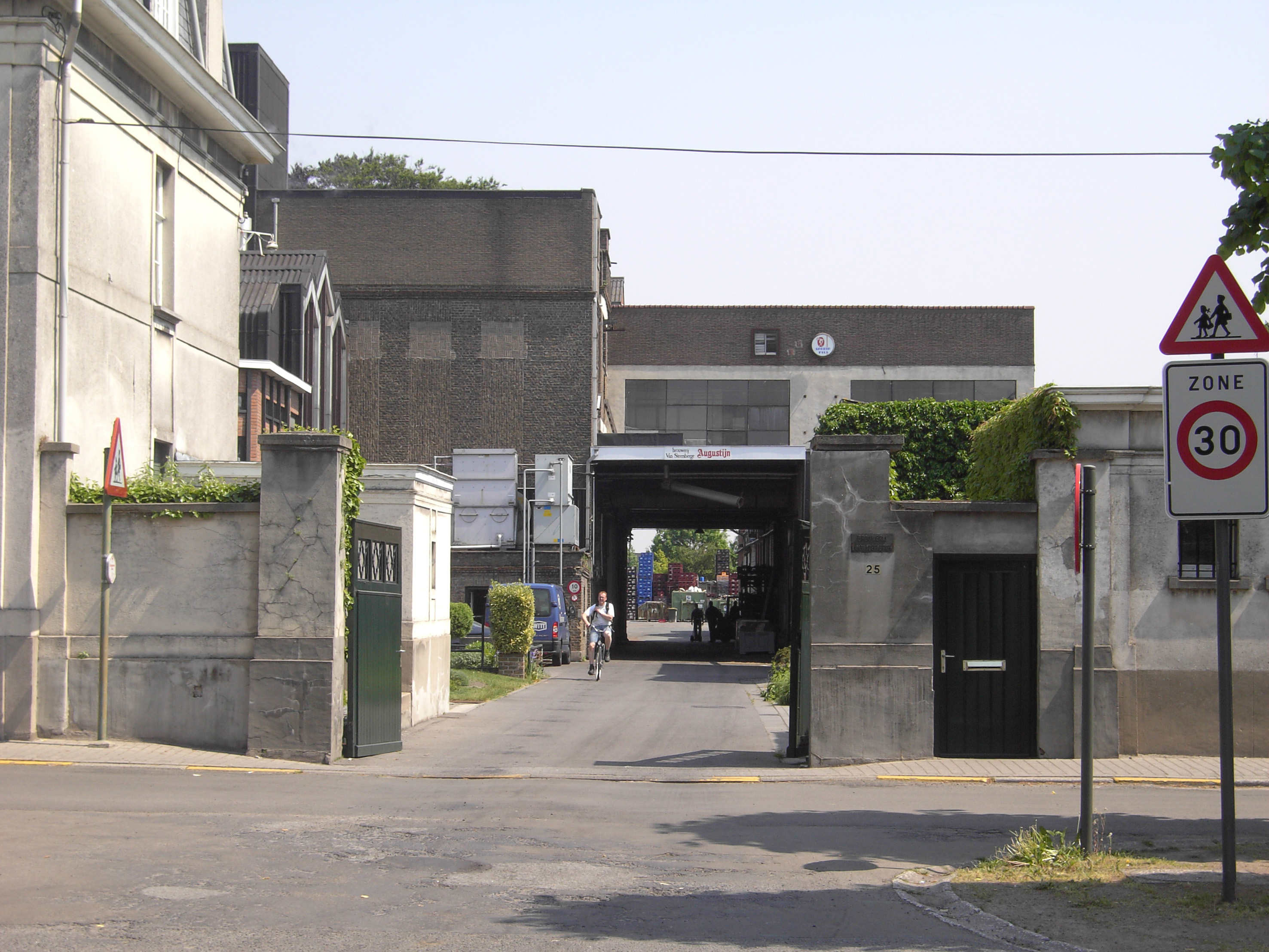
Brewery Van Steenberghe
