= De Struise Brouwers =

Microbrewery in Oostvleteren, Belgium

Coordinates: 50°55′55″N 2°44′15″E

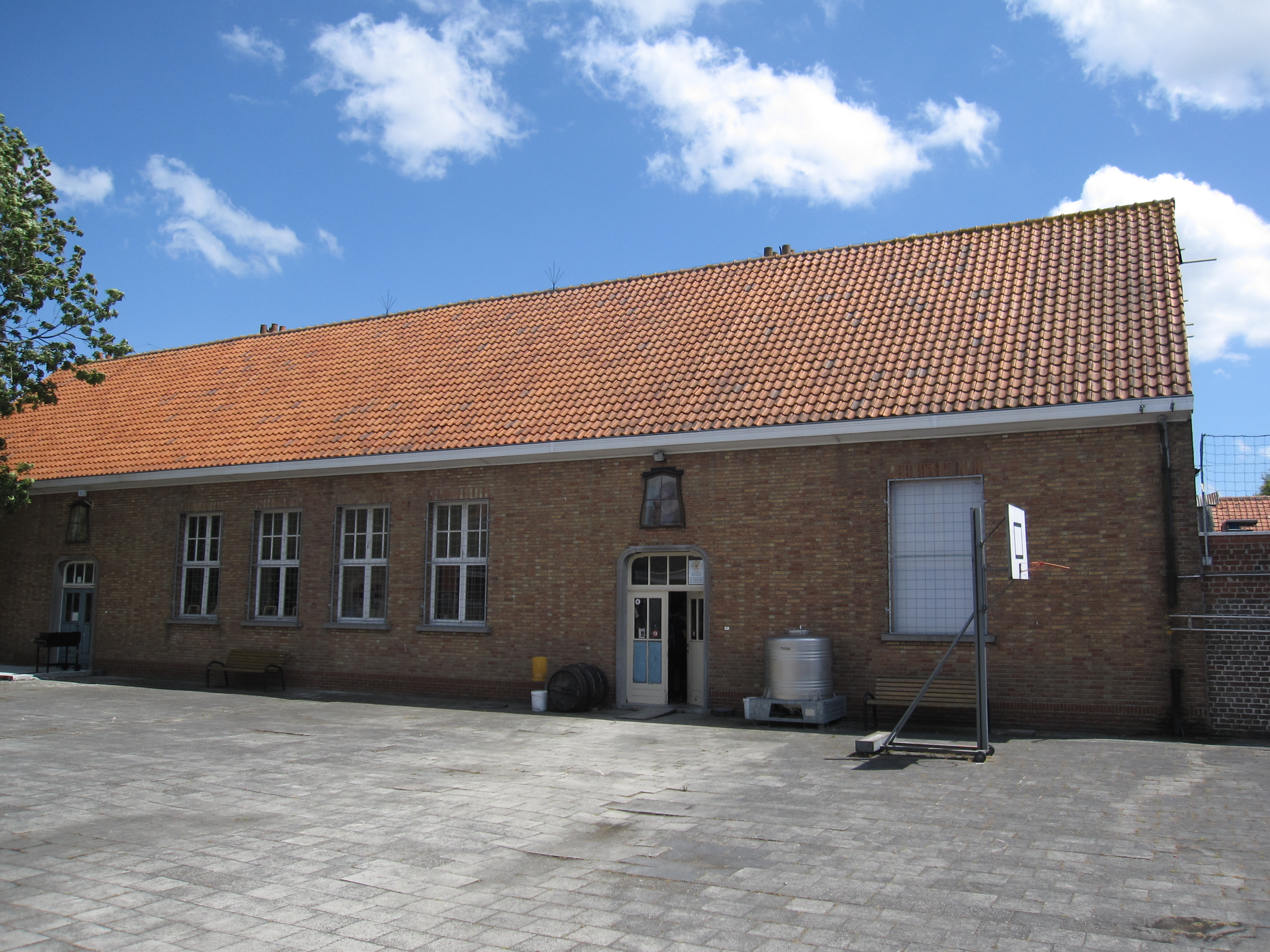
- Industry: Alcoholic beverage
- Founded: 2001
- Headquarters: Oostvleteren, Belgium
- Products: Beer
- Production output: 900 hL
- Owner: Peter Braem, Philippe Driessens and Urbain Coutteau
- Website: struise.com

De Struise Brouwers is a microbrewery located in Oostvleteren, Belgium.

== Origin ==
Owners of a nearby ostrich-raising farm in Lo-Reninge with accommodations for vacationers, Urbain Coutteau and Philippe Driessens developed an interest in making distinctive regional beers to serve to their guests. In 2001 they began doing so with help from local wine maker Carlo Grootaert, and this project eventually developed into its own independent commercial concern.

Upon its inception in 2003, Struise produced beers at the Caulier brewery in northern Hainaut. Since 2006, they have been made at the Deca brewing facility in Woesten-Vleteren in West Flanders until 2014, after beers were brewed at their own brewhouse. The firm has reported that their own microbrewery and tasting room in Het Oud Schooltje (a renovated school building) located in Oostvleteren, is open and operational.

The company takes its name from the historic Flemish word for ostrich, which also is a contemporary slang term meaning "tough". They render the name into English as "The Sturdy Brewers", and many of their labels feature ostriches, a trait they share with Dutch brewery Brouwerij 't IJ.

Following industry trends made popular by American craft brewers, the brewery has recently ventured into stronger, more flavorful beers and also barrel-aging.

They have also collaborated with other European artisan beer scene such as Denmark's Mikkeller, Estonia's Põhjala, fellow Belgians Picobrouwerij Alvinne and Brouwerij De Molen of the Netherlands, as well as American brewers. While their Black Albert was originally conceived in concert with United States-based Ebenezer's Pub, a joint effort to create a "Pannepot Cafe" in Brunswick, Maine was abandoned in May 2009.

== Awards and recognition ==
Craft beer fan rating website Ratebeer selected beers from DSB for 9 of their Top 100 Best Beers of Belgium in 2009. Struise was edged out for the #1 slot only by the venerable Trappist brewers of Westvleteren.

In 2008, RateBeer declared Struise to be the best brewers in the world per their annual members' poll. This was met with mixed opinions in the world of beer enthusiasts. Many of those critical of the award cited the recent founding of the company as well as the fact that DSB did not own a brewing facility at the time.

DSB also received 7 separate awards from Ratebeer in 2007, including accolades for the Aardmonnik and Pannepot.

== Beers ==
De Struise Brouwers Products

- Struise Witte (5.0% ABV): a Belgian-style Witbier brewed with wheat and spices.
- Struise Rosse (6.0% ABV): an unfiltered and unpasteurized amber beer of high fermentation.
- Struiselensis (6.0% ABV): a blonde sour ale finished with wild Brettanomyces bruxellensis yeast.
- Pannepot (10.0% ABV): a strong dark ale whose name references a traditional style of fishing boat in the De Panne area. This beer is considered Struise' highest selling and most popular product.
- Pannepot Grand Reserva (10.0% ABV): a barrel-aged version of the Pannepot released each year and vintage dated.
- Aardmonnik (8.0% ABV): its name meaning literally "Earthmonk", a barrel-aged strong sour ale in the Flemish Oud bruin tradition with red wine-like character and earthy, chocolate-y notes.
- Tsjeeses (10.0% ABV): an oak-aged strong golden-colored ale. Playing on the similarity of the beer's name to "Jesus", the label depicts an intoxicated long-haired figure in a Santa hat. This caused it to be rejected by the American TTB.
- Tsjeeses Reserva (10.0% ABV): a barrel-aged version of the Tsjeeses.
- Outblack (10.0% ABV)
- Sint Amatus Vintage 2010 (10.5% ABV)
- Black Albert (13.0% ABV): a strong stout inspired by the British Imperial Stout tradition as revived by American microbrewers. Described as a "Belgian Royal Stout" and made with ingredients of only Belgian origin. Bitterness of 100 IBU, deep black color of 160 EBC. Named for Belgian King Albert II.
- Cuvée Delphine (13.0% ABV): a limited bottling of the Black Albert aged in Four Roses Bourbon barrels. Named after the eponymous king's alleged illegitimate daughter, Belgian artist Delphine Boël. Featuring a label by the artist reading "Truth Can Set You Free".
- Dirty Horse (7.0% ABV): A spontaneously-fermented sour ale aged in wood.
- Red-haired Jeanne (7.0% ABV): an amber ale, brewed for a festival in remembrance of "Red-haired Jeanne", a woman from the coastal town of Nieuwpoort, where the brewmaster from Struise was born, who was reportedly convicted of witchcraft and burned at the stake.

Joint Ventures / Blended Products

- Struise Mikeller (9.0% ABV): a very bitter and potent beer in the American Double IPA style. 130 IBU. Made in collaboration with Mikkeller.
- Xenophon’s Wine (11.0% ABV): a barrel-aged version of a Barleywine originally titled "Xeno's Ale" with hopping adjusted by representatives from Chicago's Pipeworks Brewing Company.
- Hopverdomme (7.5% ABV): a strong, bitter ale brewed in concert with Pipeworks Brewing Company.
- Fedeltá (8.2% ABV): a strong blonde ale brewed in Maine in collaboration with Allagash Brewing Company. Made with 15% wheat malt, cane sugar and honey. Hopped with Cascade and Amarillo to 35 IBU.
- Twickenham Struise Porter (5.0% ABV): a Brown Porter brewed at Twickenham Fine Ales in London.

== The "Black Damnation" project ==
This project was conceived by the brewmaster at Struise. Their dark Russian imperial stout beer Black Albert serves as the base for a number of experimental brews that are to be released over a period of two years (2010-2012). As of June 2011, the following six brews have been released to the public:

- Black Damnation (13.0% ABV): a bottled blend of the Black Albert with the Hel & Verdoemenis (Hell and Damnation) of Brouwerij De Molen.
- Black Damnation II: Mocha Bomb (12.0% ABV): a blend of 50% Black Albert matured on coffee beans, 25% of the Dutch-brewed Hel & Verdoemenis matured in JD barrels for 6 months, and 25% Cuvée Delphine.
- Black Damnation III: Black Mes (13.0% ABV): a version of Black Albert aged for 3 months in whisky barrels.
- Black Damnation IV: Coffee Club (13.0% ABV): Black Albert, matured for 6 months on very old rum barrels.
- Black Damnation V: Double Black (26.0% ABV): aged Black Albert (Cuvée Delphine) of which the contents have been concentrated through the Eisbock process.
- Black Damnation XI: Special Kay (22.0% ABV): a mix of Black Albert and Kate the Great (Russian imperial stouts) aged on Noval Port barrels for 10 months, then put through the Eisbock process.

These brews have been completed, but are yet to be commercially released and have only been available for tasting at the brewery or at various beer festivals or other occasions:

- Black Damnation VI: Messy (39.0% ABV): Black Mes put through the Eisbock process twice, ending up with 39% ABV. Brewed in honor of the wedding celebration of the man that inspired the original brew.
- Black Damnation VII: Single Black (2.0% ABV): with only 2% ABV, this very light stout beer is called a BOB stout by Struise, meaning it can also be enjoyed (in moderation) by designated drivers.
- Black Damnation VIII: S.H.I.T. (12.0% ABV): a blend of Black Albert and Shark Pants. S.H.I.T. stands for Super High Intensive Taste. This blend of a Russian imperial stout and an IPA results in a black IPA.
- Black Damnation IX. Beggars' Art (18.1% ABV): Black Damnation aged on Ardbeg cask.
- Black Damnation X: Double Wood (15.0% ABV): after adding fresh yeast during aging, it ages on Balvenie sherry casks.

A number of other seasonal and limited-edition beers are also produced.
