= Pipeworks Brewing =

Brewery in Illinois, United States

Pipeworks Brewing Company
- Industry: Alcoholic beverage
- Founded: 2012
- Founder: Gerrit Lewis and Beejay Oslon
- Headquarters: 3912 W. McLean Ave. Chicago, Illinois 60647; United States
- Products: Beer
- Website: pdubs.net

Pipeworks Brewing Company is a brewery in Chicago, Illinois. The brewery opened in January 2012 by founders Beejay Oslon and Gerrit Lewis. Pipeworks began their brewing different from other microbreweries in that they initially brewed their beers entirely as a series of 'one off' beers that were aimed specifically to the niche market of beer connoisseurs. The brewery's stated goal is to release a new beer every week. This approach gave the brewery and its beers somewhat of a cult status among beer enthusiasts, with its offerings selling out relatively quickly. After seeing significant growth, both in output brand and identity, Pipeworks has since augmented their one-off beers with several of its 'core' beers in 16 ounce can 4-Packs now regularly available widely throughout the Chicago area.

== History ==
Pipeworks began as the brainchild of Oslon and Lewis, who were homebrewers that met while working at West Lakeview Liquors in Chicago. The two were educated in larger scale brewing at the De Struise Brewery in Oostvleteren, Belgium. In 2011, the pair began an online fundraising campaign to raise the capital needed to build the brewery, which would be located in Chicago's Bucktown neighborhood. Oslon and Lewis planned specifically to build a smaller brewery that veered from the conventional course followed by most commercial breweries: they would not make the same exact beer twice. This concept, which is known in the industry as gypsy brewing, became conceptualized as somewhat of a hybrid at the fledgling brewery, that style of brewing is usually done on borrowed equipment. The duo also took an unorthodox approach in the building of the brewery, raising over $30,000 (USD) through internet donations via Kickstarter. In late January, 2013, Pipeworks was awarded RateBeer's 'Best New Brewery' distinction for 2012.

In June, 2015, Pipeworks purchased a larger facility in the West Side, 3912 W. McLean Ave., near Pulaski Road and Armitage Avenue. They planned to move production to both bottling and canning. Their original facility has since been vacated and is set to be demolished to make way for condominiums.

== Beer ==
Pipeworks Beers
Name	Style	ABV %	IBU	Original Release Date	Notes
Close Encounter	Imperial Stout	8.5		5 April 2012	Batch #7, 10
Ninja Vs. Unicorn	Double India Pale Ale	8.5		3 March 2012	Batch #3, 8, 13.
End of Days	Milk Stout	6.1		25 February 2012	Batch #2
End of Days	Milk Stout	8.2		15 May 2012	Batch #12
Jones Dog	Milk Stout	6.5		10 March 2012	Batch #4
Koval Whiskey Barrel Aged Smoked Porter 20%	Porter	7		20 April 2012	Batch #1
Smoked Porter 20%	Porter	7		15 May 2012	Batch #11
Hyper Dog	Milk Stout	7.5		April 2012	Batch #9
Glaucus Belgian IPA	Belgian-styled Strong Ale	8		23 May 2012	Batch #15
Blood of the Unicorn	American Strong Ale	6.5		29 May 2012	Batch #16
Poivre Rose	Saison Brewed with Peppercorns	7.7		Summer 2012	Batch #21
Imperial Hyper Dog	Milk Stout with Cacao Nibs, Vanilla Beans, and Coffee	10.5		15 Jan 2015	Batch #614
End Boss	Kinda Hoppy Belgian Style Triple	9		15 Jan 2015	Batch #615
Crimson Snapper	Imperial IPA Brewed with Honey, Blood Orange Juice, & Citra Hops	9.5		22 Jan 2015	Batch #617 & #618
Cinnamon Beer-d O's	Cereal Milk Inspired Imperial Ale	10		23 Jan 2015	Batch #621 & #622
Yuzu	Saison	7.5		30 Jan 2015	Batch #627
Peek -A- Brew	Belgian Style Ale brewed with Red Currants and Blackberries	9.5		13 Feb 2015	Batch #637
Cherry Murderous "The Lookout"	English Barleywine Style Ale brewed with Cherries	9.5		13 Feb 2015	Batch #638
Sorachi Ace Vs Nelson Sauvin	Double IPA brewed with Sorachi Ace & Nelson Sauvin Hops	8.5		12 Feb 2015	Batch #640
Game of Jones	Imperial Milk Stout Brewed with Cacao Nibs & Vanilla Beans	10		20 Feb 2015	Batch #641 & #642
Citrus Saison	Saison Style Ale Brewed with Foraged Citrus	7.5		19 Feb 2015	Batch #643 & #644
Space Age Bachelor Pad Danish Modern Cocktail Party	Belgian Style Golden Ale	8.5		27 Feb 2015	Batch #647
Grand Guignol Act 2	Imperial Oatmeal Stout brewed with Blueberries & Coffee	11		26 Feb 2015	Batch #648
Pipework G&T	Gin and Tonic Inspired Ale	8		26 Feb 2015	Batch #652

== See also ==
- Barrel-aged beer
