= Brouwerij De Molen =

Brewery in Bodegraven, Netherlands

Coordinates: 52°5′5.86″N 4°44′18.2″E

- Interactive map of Brouwerij De Molen
- Location: Bodegraven, Netherlands
- Opened: 2004
- Annual production volume: 25000 hL
- Owner: Swinkels Family Brewers
- Website: www.brouwerijdemolen.nl

Active beers
Name	Type
Hel & Verdoemenis (Hell & Damnation)	Imperial stout
Moord & Doodslag (Murder & Manslaughter)	Imperial stout
Vuur & Vlam (Fire & Flames)	India pale ale
Tsarina Esra Imperial Porter	Imperial porter
Amarillo	Imperial IPA

Brouwerij De Molen (Dutch pronunciation: [ˌbrʌuəˈrɛi də ˈmoːlə(n)]) is a small brewery, distillery and restaurant in Bodegraven, the Netherlands. The brewery, whose name means The Mill, is in a windmill called De Arkduif, built in 1697. The premises also include the brewery taproom and a retail beer store offering European and American craft beers, as well as regional products such as farm cheese.

Having started out as a homebrewer, and after stints at several small breweries, head brewer Menno Olivier worked professionally at Stadsbrouwerij De Pelgrim in Rotterdam before founding De Molen in 2004. De Molen has participated in joint projects with other breweries such as Mikkeller and De Struise Brouwers. They have also participated in re-creations of historic beer recipes, such as those of the defunct British brewery Barclay Perkins.

== Technical information ==
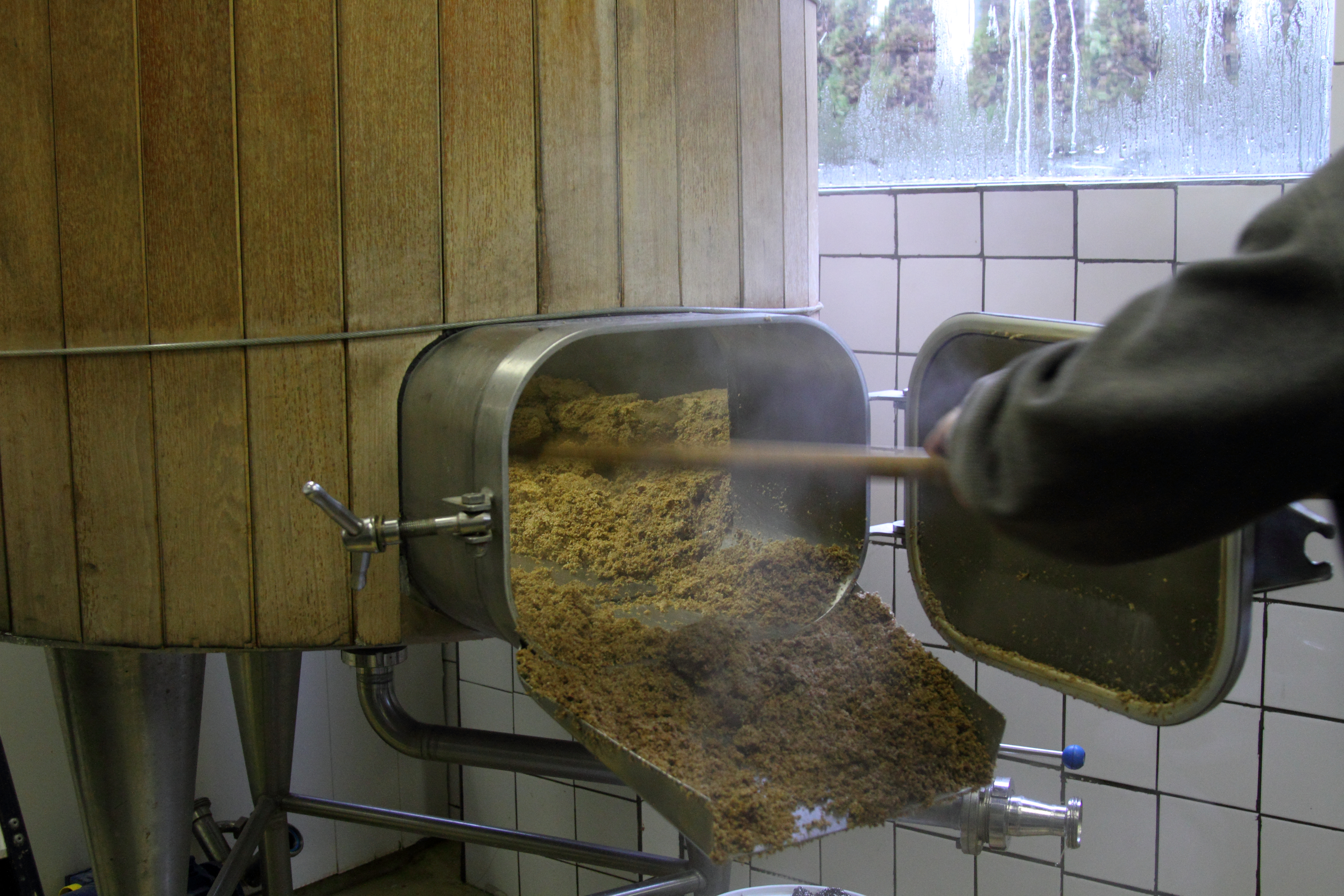
Beer preparation at the brewery

The capacity of the brewing system is 500 liters per batch, with annual production averaging a total of 500 hectoliters. The equipment includes converted dairy tanks used as fermenters. De Molen's beer is bottled by hand at the brewery, in capped 335ml and corked-and-caged 750ml bottles with a wax finish which are individually numbered. Batches of beer that are considered unsatisfactory are used as the basis of De Molen's distilled 21% ABV Beer Liqueur.

Since 2012 the maximum capacity per batch is increased to 2500 liters. A new building was acquired 200 meters from the mill. The main production happens in this new brewhouse, although the old setup is still used at least once a week. In 2016 they had to expand their current building with the objective to reach a 25.000 Hl. a year production.

== Awards and recognition ==
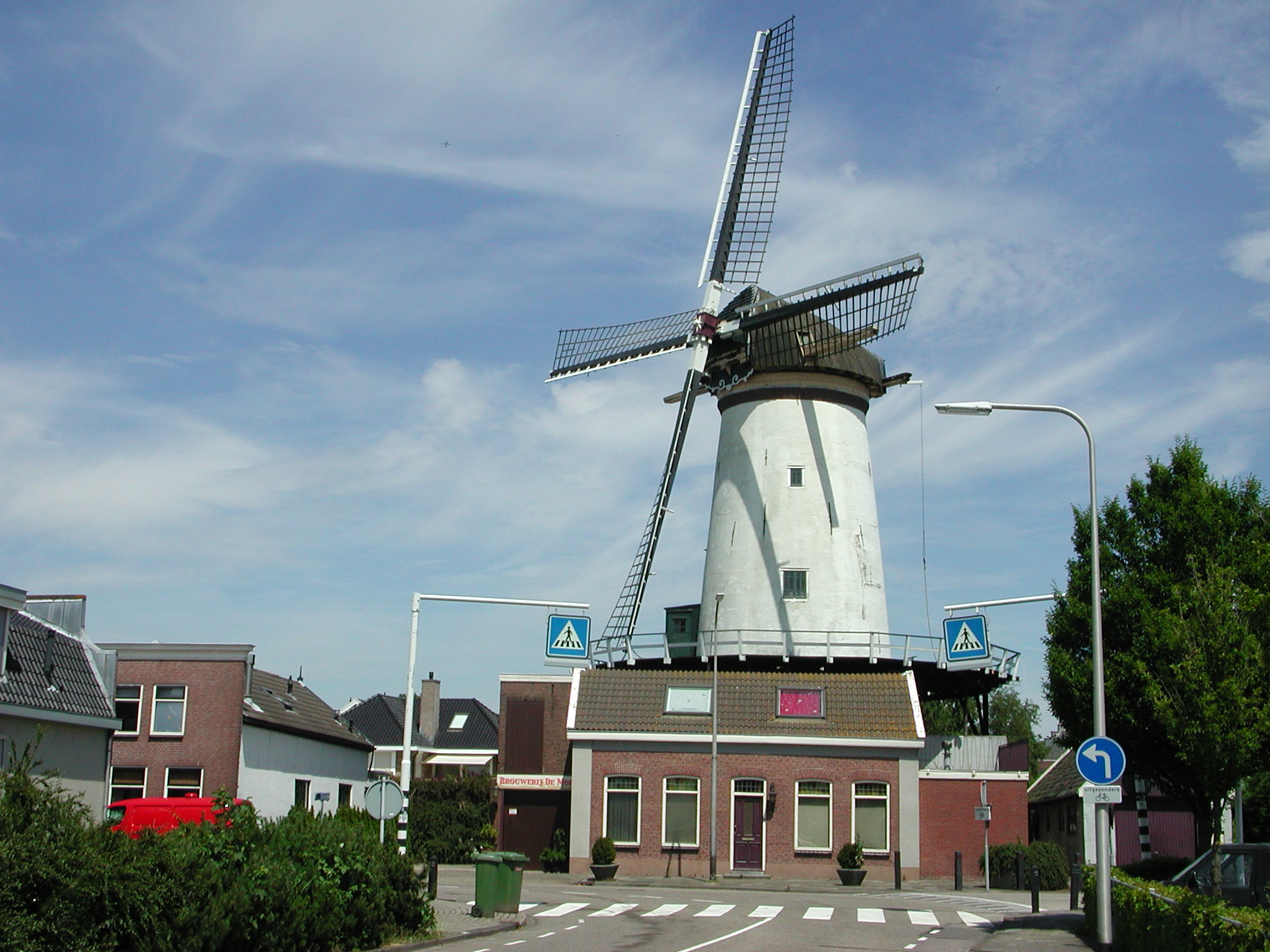
De Arkduif windmill

In 2010, De Molen was rated tenth in RateBeer's "Best Brewers in the World" list of the top 100 notable breweries.

De Molen's products dominated RateBeer's Best Beers of the Netherlands in both 2008 and 2009, occupying 7 and 8 of the first 10 slots in those years.

De Molen brewer Menno Olivier was the recipient of the 2008 Zilveren Knuppel ("silver bat"), awarded annually by the Dutch beer society PINT for his contributions to beer culture in the Netherlands.

De Molen Tsarina Esra was voted the Most Appreciated winter beer of the 2008 PINT Winter Beer festival.

De Molen and several of its beers were listed among the Beers of the Year 2008 by UK beer journalists Roger Protz and Tom Cannavan.

In 2016 Ratebeer's awards, De Molen was rated No.1 brewer of the Netherlands and ranked 6th in the "Best Brewers in the World" list.

== Events ==
Since 2009, De Molen has hosted the annual Borefts Beer Festival. This typically occurs in the early autumn, with the participation of other brewers, such as Belgium's Picobrouwerij Alvinne and De Struise Brouwers.

== Controversy ==
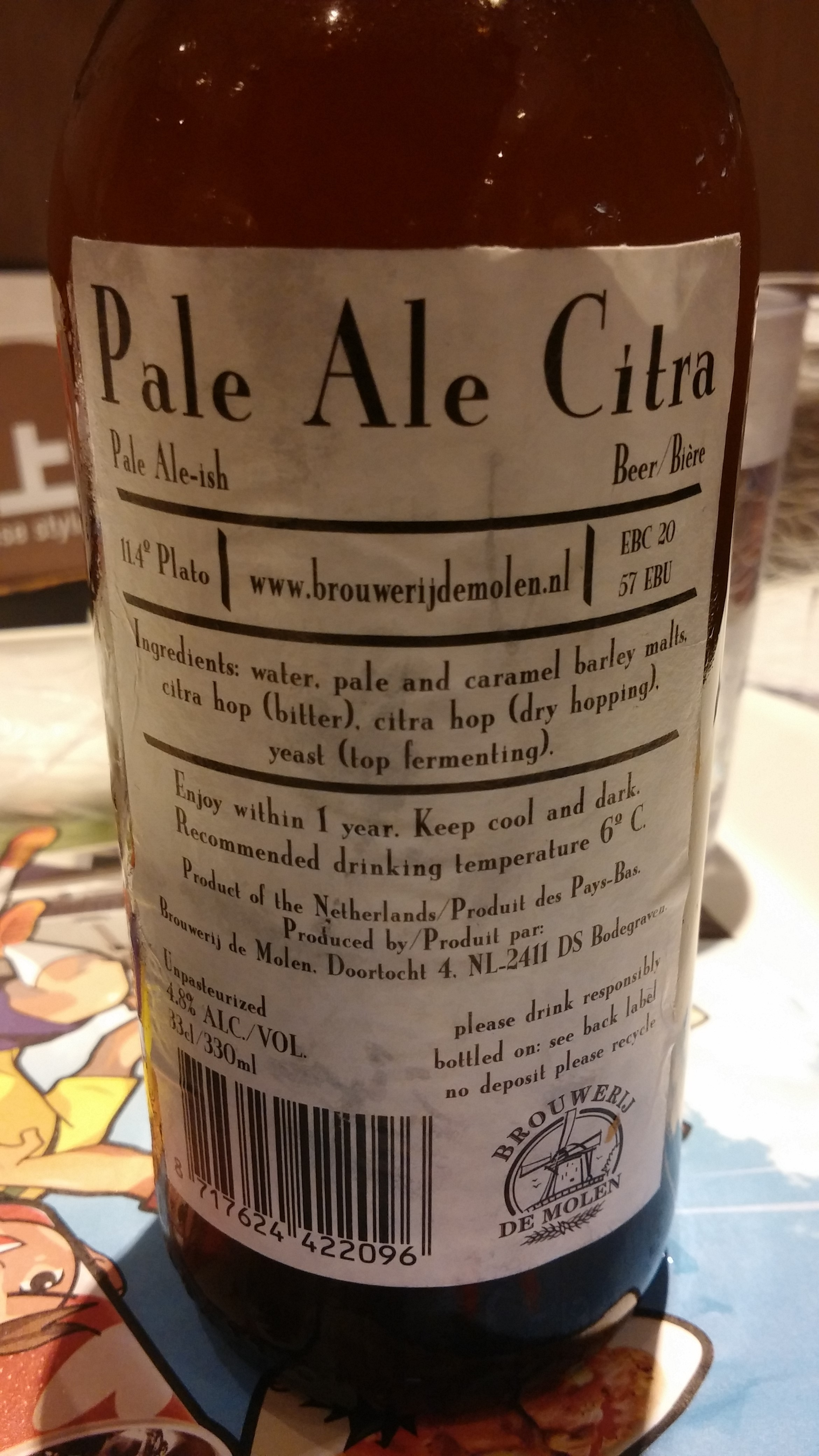
33cl Pale Ale Citra

Rasputin is an Imperial Stout; after a 2009 trademark-infringement claim was brought by California's North Coast Brewing Company, brewers of a similar beer called Old Rasputin, De Molen changed the name on the American export label to Disputin in reference to the controversy.
