= Ukrainian golden ale =

Beer style

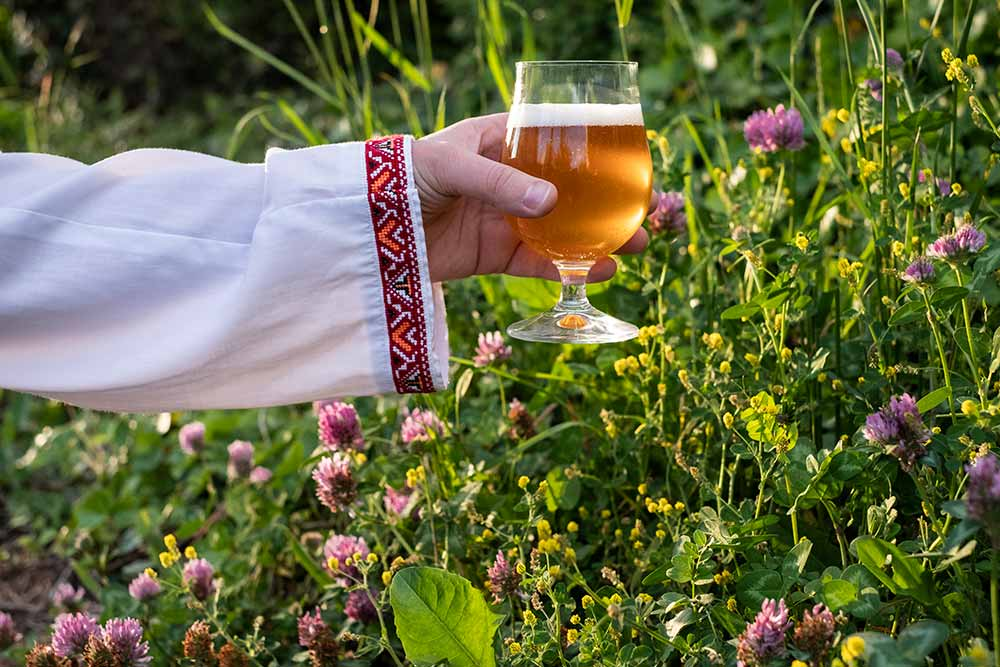
Glass of Ukrainian Golden Ale

Ukrainian golden ale is a local Ukrainian beer style, originating in the Donets'k region in 2009.

The main features distinguishing it from British golden ale and Belgian golden ale are a sweetish taste and aftertaste, fuller body, more neutral yeast-derived aromatics (in comparison with Belgian counterparts), less bitterness than in British golden ale; more alcohol than in British and less than in Belgian style. Coriander seeds are often used, and the beer can be lightly dry-hopped with aroma hops.

== History ==
The first Ukrainian golden ale was brewed at John Huges Brewery in Donets'k by Dmytro Nekrasov in 2009. It was inspired by both German (Reinheitsgebot: therefore, no sugar additions) and Belgian brewing traditions. The latter was discovered during Dmytro's trip to Belgium, urged by the brewery's owner, Vasyl Mykulin. With no sugar additions and being 100% malt based, the resulting beer differed from the Belgian counterparts by being hazy, fuller in body and sweeter, though it was sold as Belgian Ale upon its inception. The recipe was heavily influenced by the availability of ingredients too: initially dry S-33 yeast were used, with subsequent use of the same strain, US 05, or a mix of both.

After the occupation of Donets'k, both Dmytro Nekrasov and Vasyl Mykulin had to flee the city and start brewing at different breweries, taking the Golden Ale with them. The style gained a following as a stepping stone for beer lovers, a middle ground between mass-market beer and new-wave beer, being quite approachable. Eventually, the style was adopted by a number of breweries. Independent Brewers of Ukraine approximated that in 2021 Ukrainians consumed 1.25 million liters of golden ale.

For a while, the beers were labeled as generic "Golden Ale" or "Belgian Ale" because of the lack of uninterrupted brewing tradition in Ukraine and the persistent perception of foreign beers/styles to be superior.

== Comparison with other styles ==
| | British Golden Ale | Belgian Golden Strong Ale | Ukrainian Golden Ale |
| Percent ABV | 3.5-5 | 7.5–10.5 | 6.1–7.5 |
| Finish and Body | medium-dry to dry | dry, effervescent | semidry to dry, with sweet, lingering aftertaste, fuller body |
| IBUs, Hops | 20–45, English and/or New World | 22–35, European | 15–30, European and/or New World |
| Ale Yeast | clean British | fruity Belgian | Neutral strain or slightly fruity, low-attenuating, slight phenols optional |
| Fermantables | pale or lager malt, corn, wheat, and/or sugar | pilsner, substantial sugar addition | pale or lager, wheat, no sugar |
| Additives | none | rarely | usually coriander |

== International exposure ==
The campaign for the recognition of Ukrainian golden ale as a local style began in 2021, with final tastings and compiling of proper description in January 2022. A group of enthusiasts, Independent Brewers of Ukraine, breweries, and independent members of the beer community began promoting the style actively around the world by pouring the beer at festivals, collaborating with international breweries, spreading the word, etc.

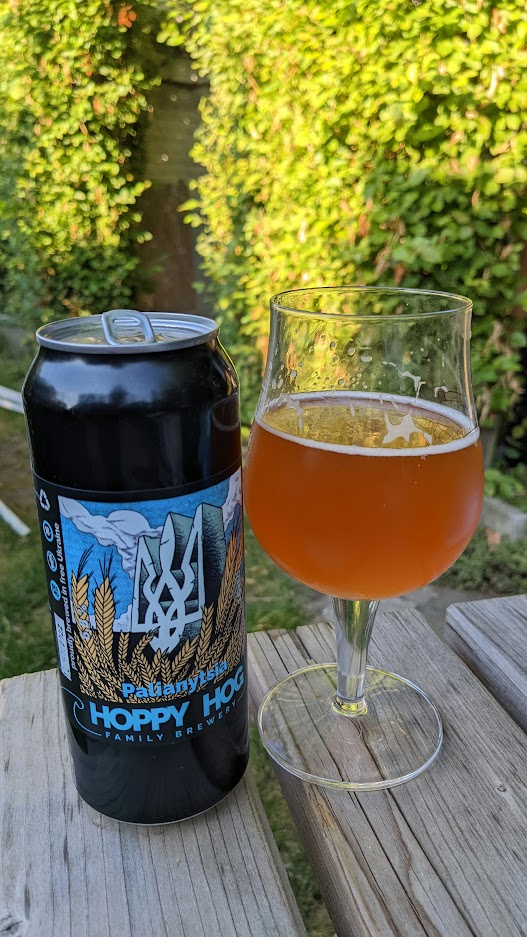
One of the style examples from Ukrainian brewery

As of 2022, the style was brewed in the US, England, Scotland, Denmark, Poland, Ireland, Canada, and Ecuador. Some of those beers became core-range fixtures instead of one-offs.

Ukrainian golden ale was a special category at the U.S. Open Beer Competition in 2022. The same year the style got its own category in Untappd.

In July 2023, the style became a part of the Beer Style Guidelines of EBCU
