= Westvleteren =

Coordinates: 50°54′48″N 2°43′04″E

Location of Westvleteren within the municipality of Vleteren.

Westvleteren is a village in the province of West Flanders, Belgium. It is a section of the municipality of Vleteren. The core of it is a linear settlement along the N321 road.

Westvleteren is primarily known for the Westvleteren Brewery (Dutch: Brouwerij Westvleteren), a brewery founded in 1838 inside the Trappist Abbey of Saint Sixtus of Westvleteren. Its beers have often been rated best in the entire world. The current brewing capacity is roughly 500,000 cases per year. While taste is highly subjective and individual, some international beer drinkers consider the Westvleteren 12 to be among their favourite beers. The majority of members of BeerAdvocate and RateBeer, two beer rating websites, consistently rate the Westvleteren 12 as their most enjoyable beer; the 8 and the Blonde also rank highly on both sites.

The parish and the church were named after Saint Martin of Tours. The Saint Martin Church (Dutch: Sint-Martinuskerk) is of late Gothic style with Romanesque components, and is a protected building.

== Gallery ==
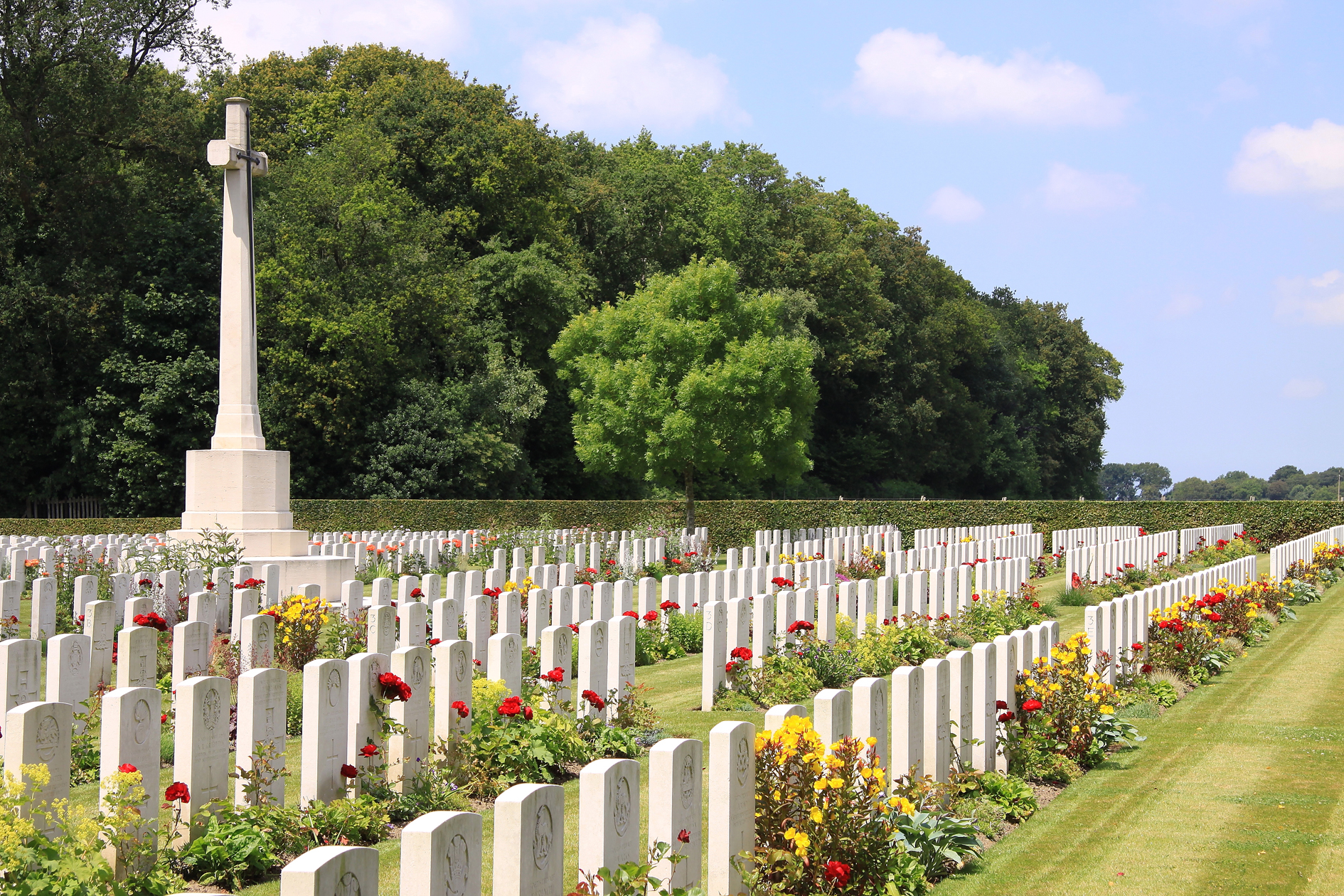
Dozinghem Military Cemetery - Cross of Sacrifice

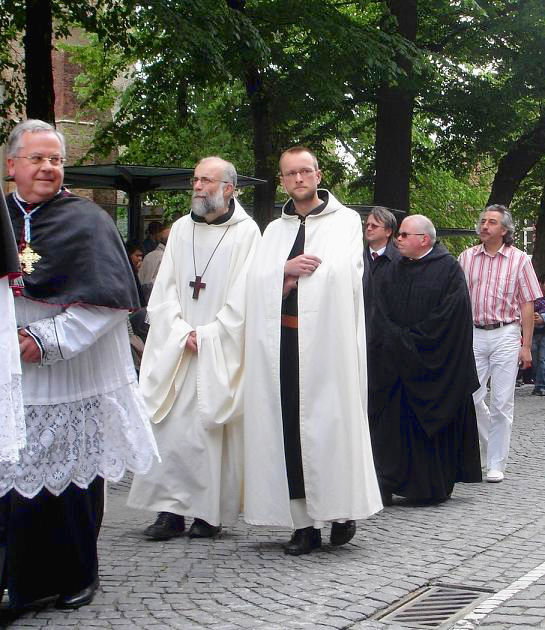
Procession of the Holy Blood in Bruges: abbott Van Hecke (second to the left) with one of his monks

Westvleteren In de Vrede - Official Information - In de Vrede
