= Beoir =

Beoir may refer to:

- Beoir, a member organisation of the European Beer Consumers' Union

== Other languages ==
- Beoir is an Irish language word for beer
- Beoir is a Shelta word for woman
