= Mont des Cats =

Hill near Godewaersvelde, France

Coordinates: 50°47′N 2°40′E

Mont des Cats is a small hill (alt. 164 m) near the town of Godewaersvelde, France. Located in the Nord department, its Flemish name is Katsberg. The hill is seat of the Mont des Cats abbey, famous for its cheese produced by monks since 1890.

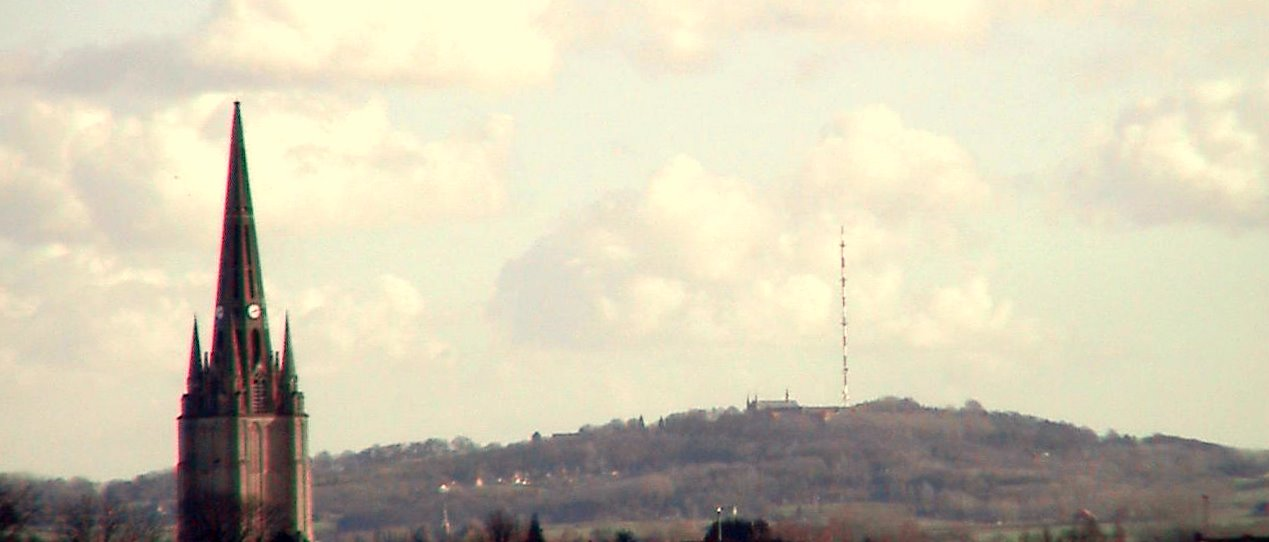
Mont des Cats as viewed from the town of Steenvoorde.

Atop the hill stands an antenna that reaches a height of 364 m and transmits both television and radio signals. It transmits FM radio signals at 500 W and has three ultra-high frequency 80 kW transmitters for TV broadcasting.

The antenna provides radio and television for part of the Nord Pas de Calais digital television (DTT).

The traditional feast of Saint-Hubert is held atop this hill on the third Sunday in October.

== Origin of the name ==
The name has nothing to do with cats, but is derived from the name of a Germanic tribe known as Chatti (French: Chattes; Dutch; Chatten), living in the area after the fall of the Roman Empire (5th century).

== Mont des Cats Abbey ==
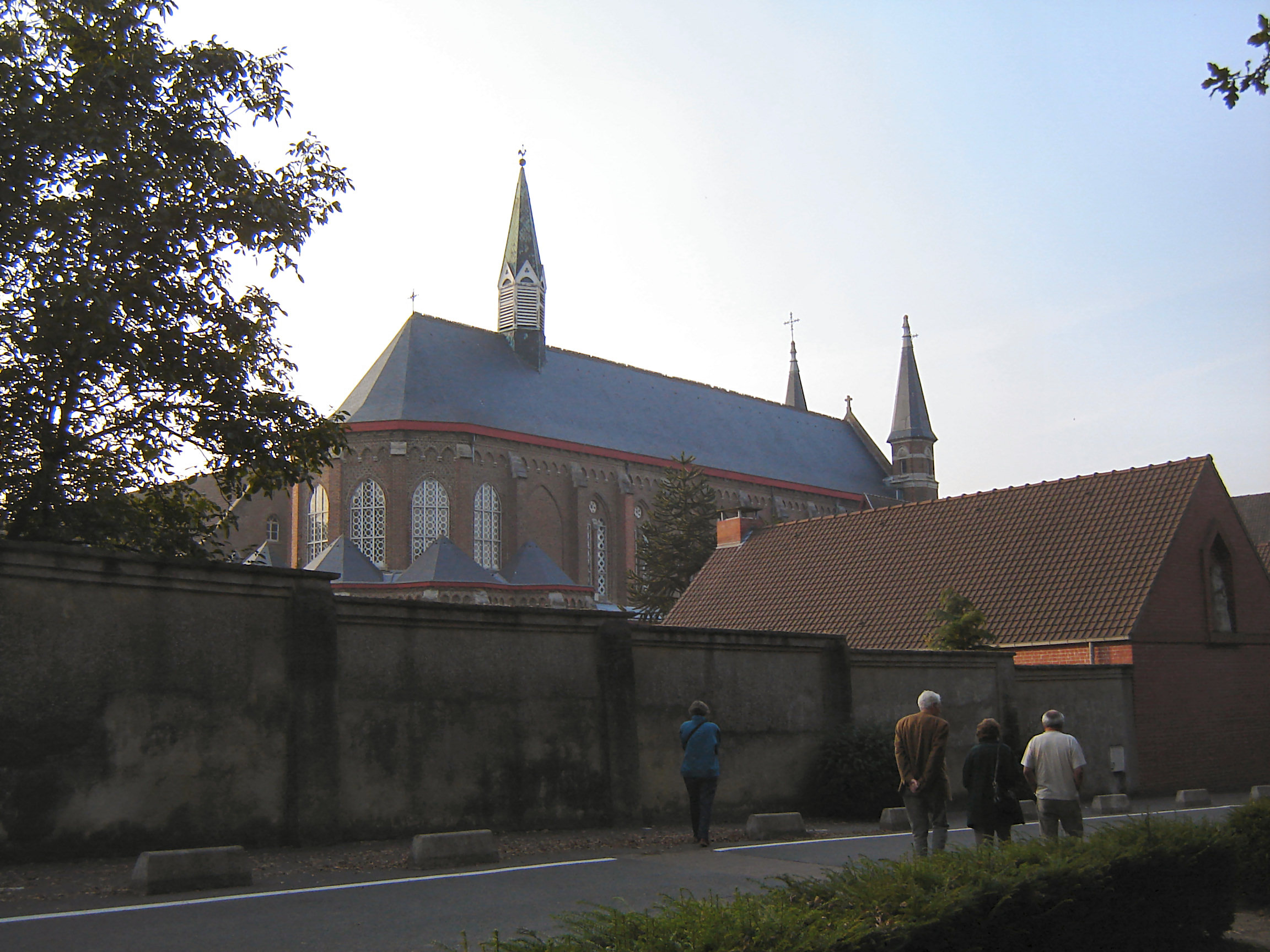
The Mont des Cats abbey

A first community of the Hospital Brothers of St. Anthony was settled in 1650 and lasted until the French Revolution which closed the monastery in 1792.

In 1819, the painter Nicolas Ruyssen bought the ruins of the former hermitage to found a school. He had the buildings restored and in 1821, opened a boarding school there with the help of the Brothers of the Christian Schools of Saint-Omer. He soon had a hundred pupils but at his age, it was too heavy a burden. In 1825, he contacted the Trappist Abbey of Notre Dame du Gard. Eight Trappist monks arrived on 26 January 1826 and founded the Mont des Cats abbey. This congregation has run the abbey ever since. A breakaway group of Trappist monks left Mont des Cats and settled in Westvleteren (Belgium).

== World War One ==
During World War One the abbey was the scene of much action, particularly in 1914 during the Battle of Messines. On 12 October 1914, the British 3rd Cavalry Brigade consisting of 4th Hussars, 5th Royal Irish Lancers and 16th Lancers attacked Mont des Cats, against Germans who were dug in on Mont des Cats and at Vleteren. They advanced up the slopes covered in hop-fields towards the monastery on the hilltop, with dismounted cavalry attacking from the west and mounted cavalry with a battery of horse artillery from the south. After some hard fighting, the monastery was wrested from German hands. During this engagement, Prince Maximilian Friedrich Wilhelm Georg von Hesse was mortally wounded and died in the monastery later that night. The 5th Lancers occupied the monastery that night along with some German wounded.

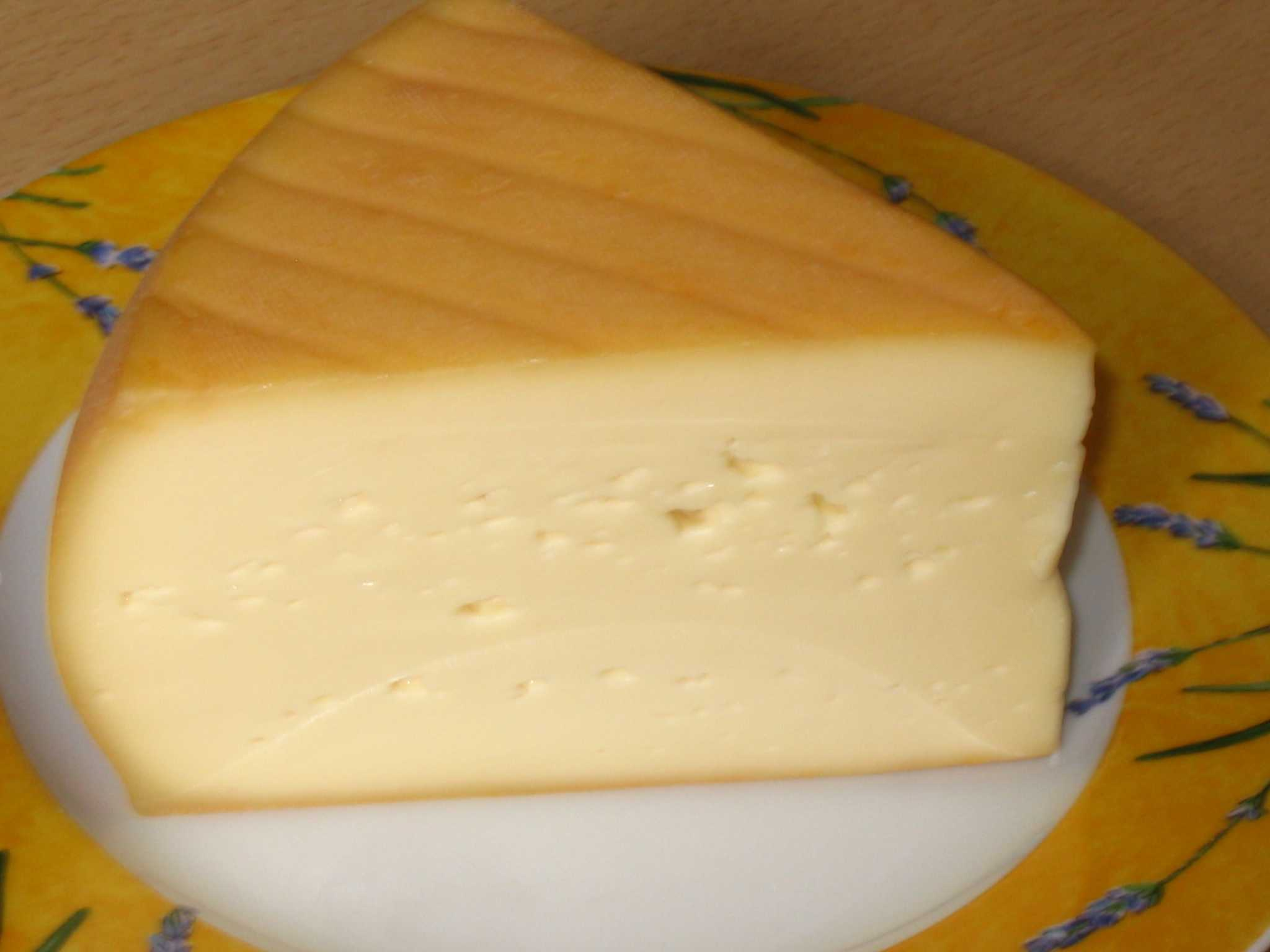
Mont des Cats cheese

== Mont des Cats cheese ==
Mont des Cats cheese has been produced by the monks since 1890 with the milk of local farms, in a small independent dairy. The production method are similar to those used for Port-salut. Affinage (maturing) takes a minimum of one month and during this period the cheese is washed in salted water and dyed with roucou, a reddish derivative from annatto seeds. The texture of the cheese is firm, uncooked, pressed and has small holes. The fat content is 50%. In Flanders it is sometimes eaten as a breakfast cheese with bread and coffee.

== Cycling ==
Mont des Cats
- Location: Nord-Pas-de-Calais, France
- Start: Boeschepe
- Gain in altitude: 45 m (148 ft)
- Length of climb: 500 m (1,600 ft)
- Maximum elevation: 150 m (490 ft)
- Average gradient: 9 %
- Maximum gradient: 14 %

The Mont des Cats is regularly included in cycling races in spring, such as Gent–Wevelgem and the Four Days of Dunkirk. It featured once in the Tour de France.

== See also ==
Mont des Cats has inspired the name of the software company Mondeca.
