= English-language names given by WWI troops to places affected by WWI =

This is a list of English-language names given by World War I troops to places affected by World War I. Indeed, because there were many tensions during World War 1, some places had to be renamed. Since there was a very anti-German sentiment during World War 1, the military and government would rename towns, like Kitchener, Ontario in Canada, which was named Berlin until WWI. Another reason why English-language names were given by troops to places affected by WW1 is that English-speaking troops often fought in unknown territory and had difficulty pronouncing foreign placenames. Thus, with the advent of strategising and the creation of trench maps, the English-speaking troops (mostly belonging to the British Empire, and Americans starting in 1917) had to find a way to locate places and themselves.

== In France and Belgium ==
- Berloo, Baloo: Bailleul
- Bosheep: Boeschepe
- Caterpillar Valley: a valley near Albert, Somme
- Caterpillar Wood: a wood in Caterpillar Valley
- Dirty Bucket Corner: northwest of Ypres
- Eat Apples: Étaples
- Fitzclarence Farm: east of Ypres
- Funky Villages: Foncquevillers
- Gerty Wears Velvet: Goedesversvelde
- God: Goedesversvelde
- Monty Bong: Montauban-de-Picardie
- Moo-cow: Mouquet Farm, near Pozières
- Mucky Farm: Mouquet Farm, near Pozières
- Ocean Villas: Auchonvillers, Somme
- Plugstreet: Ploegsteert, Belgium
- Polygon Wood, Zonnebeke: from French Bois du Polygone
- Pop: Poperinghe
- White Sheet: Wytschaete
- Wipers: Ypres

- Army map of an area of the Western Front, showing several such Army renamings
