= Nicolas Ruyssen =

French painter

Nicolas Joseph Ruyssen
- Born: 17 March 1757; Hazebrouck
- Died: 7 May 1826 (aged 69); Godewaersvelde
- Resting place: Mont des Cats; 50°47′5.95″N 2°39′54.46″E
- Education: École des Beaux-Arts de Saint-Omer
- Known for: Master draughtsman of the royal princesses of England under the reign of King George III; Founder of the Abbaye of Mont des Cats
- Patrons: Anne Louis Alexandre de Montmorency

Nicolas Joseph Ruyssen (17 March 1757 – 7 May 1826) was a French painter and the master draughtsman of the royal princesses of England under the reign of King George III.

== Life ==
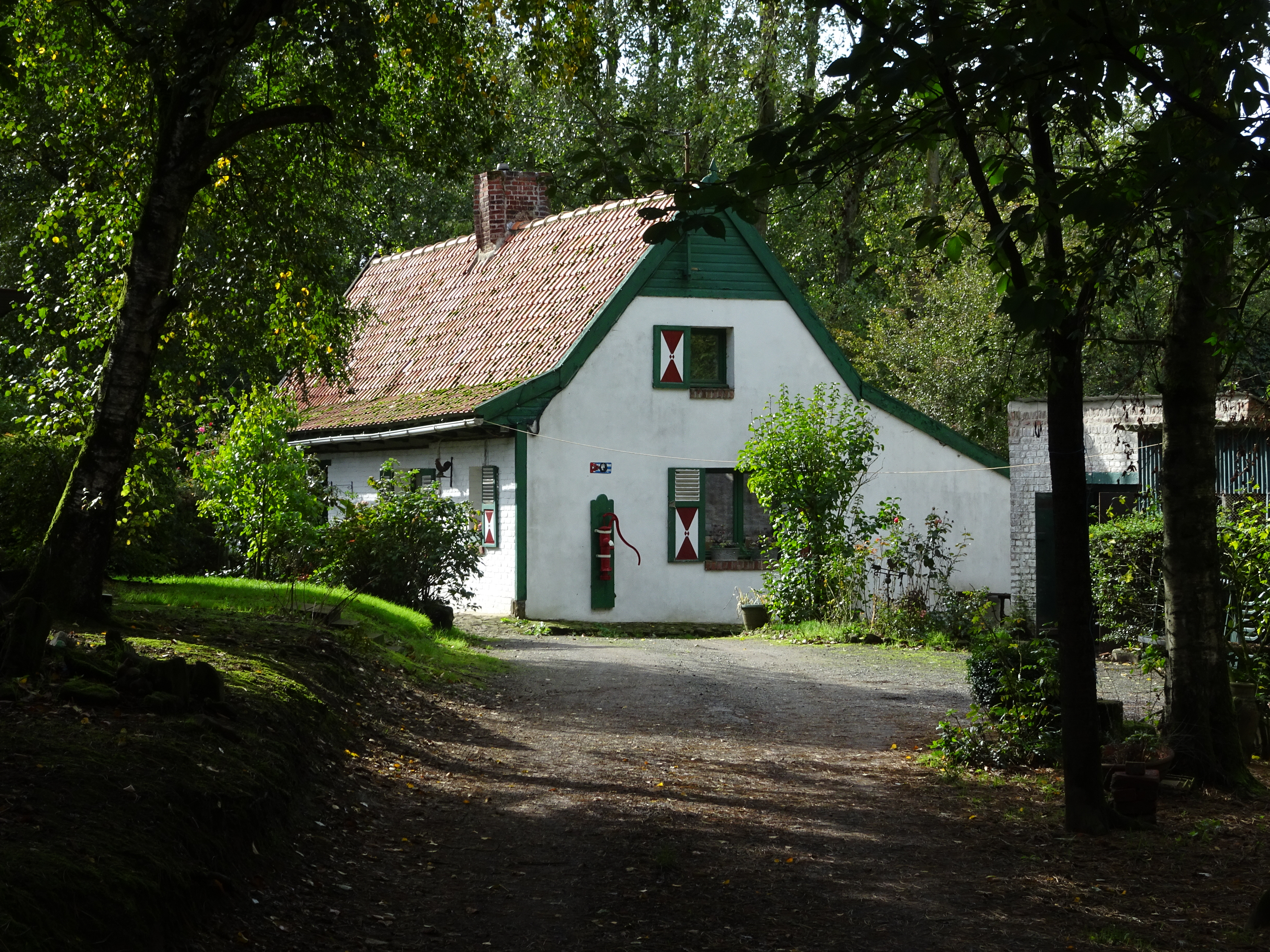
House of Nicolas Ruyssen in Godewaersvelde

Born on 17 March 1757 in the house of a gardener in Hazebrouck, Nicolas Ruyssen showed a talent for drawing from an early age and by the age of eighteen had won first prize at the École des Beaux-Arts de Saint-Omer. Introduced to the entourage of the Duke Anne Louis Alexandre de Montmorency, the young artist was indebted to his distinguished patron for a long stay in Paris. After winning first prize at the École des Beaux-Arts of Saint-Omer in 1775, he spent 6 years in Paris, then several years in Rome at the French Academy in Rome alongside other fellows students like painter Jean-Baptiste Wicar and architects Charles Percier and Pierre Fontaine. He became friends with John Flaxman. Returning to Belgium in June 1791, he first settled with his friend, the Prince de la Basèque, in Reningelst on the Belgian border.

In 1793, fleeing the French Revolution, he took refuge in England. Most of the large-format works painted by Ruyssen were destroyed in the fire at his patrons' castle in Reningelst on 6 September 1793 on the orders of General Dominique Vandamme. At an unknown date, he found employment as drawing-master to the daughters of King George III. Several artists, including Biagio Rebecca (1735–1808) and Peltro William Tomkins (1760–1840), worked for the Royal family during this period. Ruyssen was commissioned by Sir William Beechey to paint Queen Charlotte in 1799. In 1801, he published drawings based on the Raphael cartoons owned by the Windsor family in collaboration with engraver Anthony Cardon. Work on the project was suspended in 1801, suggesting that Ruyssen had left the royal service. Little is known of his activities in England thereafter. He painted a portrait of the children of Lord David Gordon (1753–1831) c. 1804. He is known to have given drawing lessons in London around 1810.

Ruyssen returned to France in 1814. In Hazebrouck, he restored several paintings and donated some canvases to the church of Saint Eloi in Hazebrouck. Five of his paintings are kept in the Augustins Museum in Hazebrouck.

In 1819, he bought the ruins of the former hermitage of the Hospital Brothers of St. Anthony on the Mont des Cats to found a school. He had the buildings restored and in 1821, opened a boarding school there with the help of the Brothers of the Christian Schools of Saint-Omer. He soon had a hundred pupils but at his age, it was too heavy a burden. In 1825, he contacted the Trappist Abbey of Notre Dame du Gard. Eight Trappist monks arrived on 26 January 1826 and founded the Mont des Cats abbey.

A few months after the arrival of the monks, Ruyssen died from apoplexy in his home in Godewaersvelde on 7 May 1826. Other sources wrongly reported 17 May or 8 May. In his will, Ruyssen included a clause requiring the monks to teach Flemish, French and the principles of religion to the children of the neighbourhood. He was buried in the oratory of the monastery. When the new monastery was built, his body was transferred to the Mont des Cats abbey church.
