= Hazebrouck =

Hazebrouck Oazebroeke (West Flemish) Hazebroek (Dutch)
- Commune
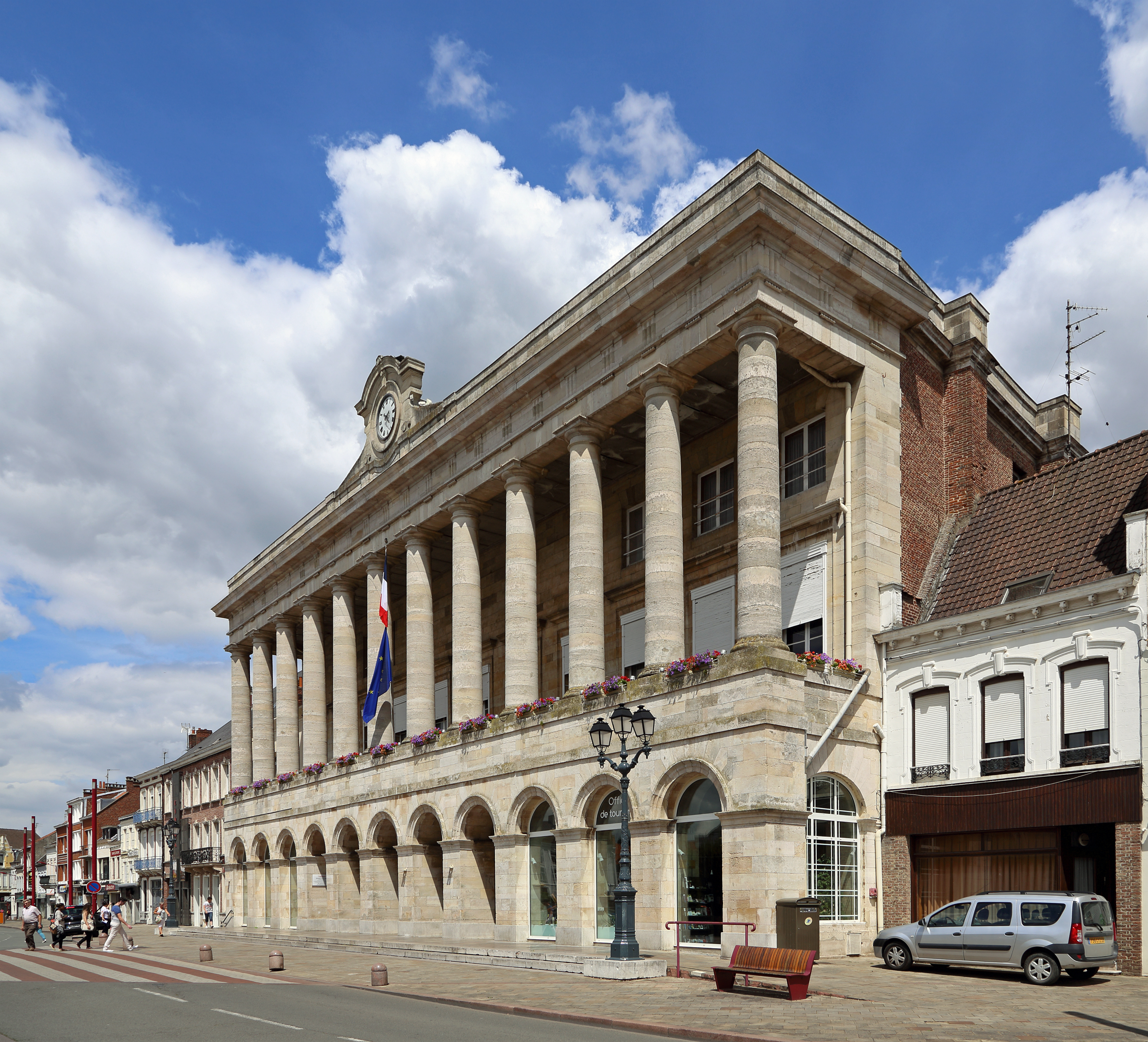
- The Hôtel de Ville

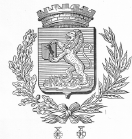
- Coat of arms
- Location of Hazebrouck
- Location within France Location within Hauts-de-France
- Coordinates: 50°43′30″N 2°32′21″E
- Country: France
- Region: Hauts-de-France
- Department: Nord
- Arrondissement: Dunkerque
- Canton: Hazebrouck
- Intercommunality: CA Cœur de Flandre

Government
  - Mayor (2020–2026): Valentin Belleval
- Area^{1}: 26.2 km^{2} (10.1 sq mi)
- Elevation: 23 m (75 ft)
- Highest elevation: 66 m (217 ft)
- Lowest elevation: 17 m (56 ft)
- Population (2023): 21,912
  - Density: 836/km^{2} (2,170/sq mi)
- Demonym: Hazebrouckois
- Time zone: UTC+01:00 (CET)
  - Summer (DST): UTC+02:00 (CEST)
- INSEE/Postal code: 59295 /59190
- Website: www.ville-hazebrouck.fr
- ^{1} French Land Register data, which excludes lakes, ponds, glaciers > 1 km^{2} (0.386 sq mi or 247 acres) and river estuaries.

Hazebrouck (French pronunciation: [azbʁuk]; Dutch: Hazebroek, pronounced [ˈɦaːzəbruk]; West Flemish: Oazebroeke) is a commune in the Nord department, Hauts-de-France. It was a small market town in Flanders until it became an important railway junction in the 1860s. West Flemish was the usual language until the late 19th century, after which French became widespread through state schooling and the development of railways linking Hazebrouck to Lille, Calais, and Dunkirk.

== History ==
The incorporation into France of what had previously been a Flemish town was ratified under the Treaties of Nijmegen in 1678.

The oldest monument of the town is St Eloi's church. The Hôtel de Ville was completed in 1820.

During the two world wars Hazebrouck was an important military target. Many British soldiers are buried in the cemeteries around the town. In the town museum, which was originally a chapel and friary of the Augustines, visitors can see the Hazebrouck's giants: Roland, Tisje-Tasje, Toria and Babe-Tasje.

=== World War I: Fourth Battle of Ypres and Hazebrouck ===
An attack by the German army was proposed in October 1917 by the Army Group Commander Field Marshal Prince Rupprecht of Bavaria as a large-scale attack either carried by itself or as an attack to relieve pressure on the German Front. Rupprecht's Army Group held the German Front in Flanders and Picardy.

The operation was given the codename of "George" and plans were submitted for an offensive attack between Ypres and Bethune. The breakthrough would be made in the British Front just south of the Belgian-French border in the Lys river area with the intention to get past the Allied Front there and advance to Hazebrouck. This would divide and cut the British Second Army near the Lys river away from the British Army in Artois. The British-held rail centre of Hazebrouck would be captured and the British troops in Belgian Flanders could be forced westwards and stuck on the Belgian coast. The operation would, however, only be possible to start from April.

During the Battle of the Lys, the German Sixth Army renewed its attack in the south on 12 April 1918, towards the important supply centre of Hazebrouck. The Germans advanced some 2–4 kilometres (1.2–2.5 mi) and captured Merville. On 13 April they were stopped by the First Australian Division, which had been transferred to the area. The British Fourth Division defended Hinges Ridge, the Fifth Division held Nieppe Forest and the 33rd Division was also involved. This became known as the Battle of Hazebrouck.

=== Heraldry ===
Arms of Hazebrouck	The arms of Hazebrouck are blazoned : Argent, a lion sable langued gules, holding an inescutcheon Or charged with a 'coney courant bendwise proper.

== Population ==
Historical population

Year	Pop.	±% p.a.
1793	6,304	—
1800	6,611	+0.68%
1806	7,354	+1.79%
1821	7,384	+0.03%
1831	7,522	+0.19%
1836	7,674	+0.40%
1841	7,574	−0.26%
1846	7,570	−0.01%
1851	7,953	+0.99%
1856	7,892	−0.15%
1861	8,273	+0.95%
1866	9,017	+1.74%
1872	9,435	+0.76%
1876	9,857	+1.10%
1881	10,595	+1.45%
1886	11,332	+1.35%
1891	11,672	+0.59%
1896	12,571	+1.50%
1901	13,261	+1.07%

Year	Pop.	±% p.a.
1906	12,819	−0.68%
1911	12,566	−0.40%
1921	14,584	+1.50%
1926	14,845	+0.36%
1931	14,859	+0.02%
1936	15,462	+0.80%
1946	14,391	−0.72%
1954	15,525	+0.95%
1962	17,446	+1.47%
1968	19,037	+1.47%
1975	19,866	+0.61%
1982	20,008	+0.10%
1990	20,567	+0.35%
1999	21,396	+0.44%
2007	21,313	−0.05%
2012	21,866	+0.51%
2017	21,441	−0.39%
2023	21,912	+0.36%

Source: EHESS and INSEE (1968-2023)

== Politics ==
=== Presidential Elections 2nd Round ===
Election	Winning candidate	Party	%
2017	Emmanuel Macron	En Marche!	56.19
2012	François Hollande	PS	56.18
2007	Nicolas Sarkozy	UMP	52.69
2002	Jacques Chirac	RPR	81.70

== Town twinning ==
Hazebrouck is twinned with the market town of Faversham in Kent, United Kingdom.

== College Saint-Jacques private chapel ==
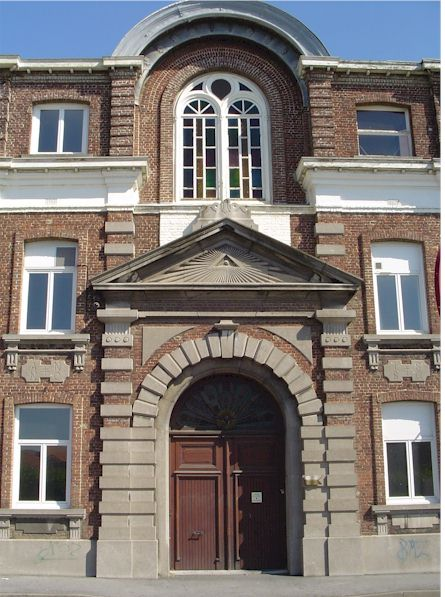
The entrance of the chapel

A private chapel which is now part of College Saint-Jacques can now be visited. This old College was an English hospital during the First World War.

== Transportation ==
The town has a railway station, with frequent daily services to Lille and Paris, some via the LGV Nord. There is also a small international airport, concentrating on business flights, at Merville-Calonne just 12 kilometre / 8 miles away. The town is connected to the national Autoroute network, which links Hazebrouck with Dunkirk and Lille and, less directly, Arras, Paris, Calais and Brussels.

== See also ==
- Communes of the Nord department
- French Flanders
- Nicolas Ruyssen

== Sources ==
- Becke, A. F. (2007) [1934]. History of the Great War: Order of Battle of Divisions, Part 1: The Regular British Divisions (Naval & Military Press, Uckfield ed.). London: HMSO. ISBN 978-1-84734-738-1.
- Edmonds, J. E.; et al. (1995) [1937]. Military Operations France and Belgium: 1918 March–April: Continuation of the German Offensives. History of the Great War Based on Official Documents by Direction of the Historical Section of the Committee of Imperial Defence. Vol. II (Imperial War Museum & Battery Press ed.). London: Macmillan. ISBN 978-0-89839-223-4.
