= Hôtel de Ville, Hazebrouck =

Town hall in Hazebrouck, France

Hôtel de Ville
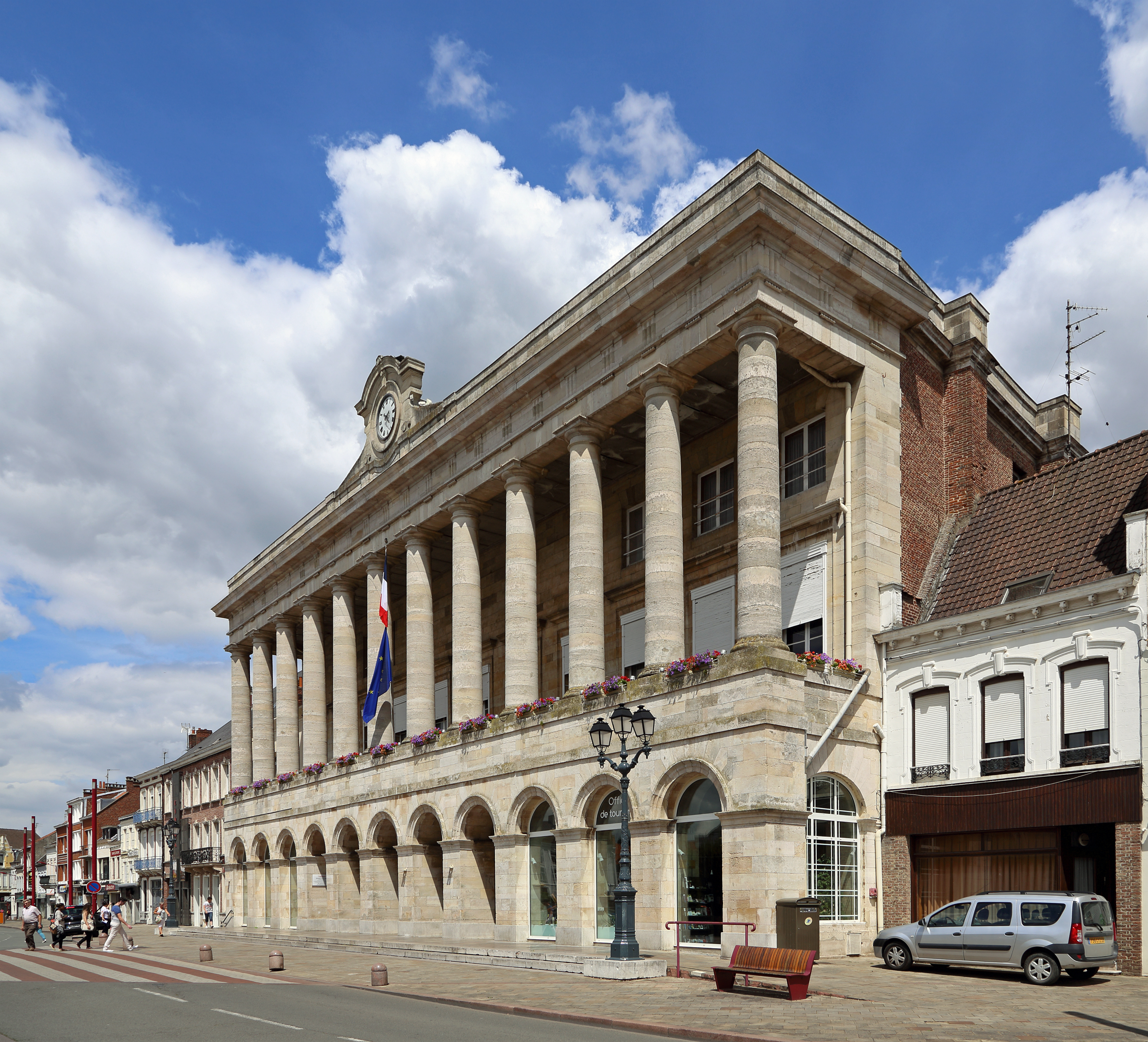
- The main frontage of the Hôtel de Ville in July 2017
- Interactive map of the Hôtel de Ville area

General information
- Type: City hall
- Architectural style: Neoclassical style
- Location: Hazebrouck, France
- Coordinates: 50.7226°N 2.5367°E
- Completed: 1820

Design and construction
- Architect: Sieur Drapier

The Hôtel de Ville (French pronunciation: [otɛl də vil], City Hall) is a municipal building in Hazebrouck, Nord, in northern France, standing on Place du Général de Gaulle.

== History ==
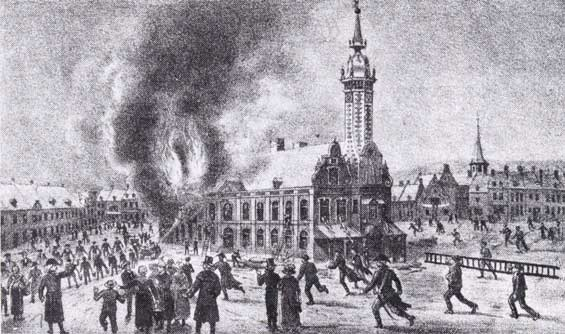
The old town hall in flames

The first municipal building in the town was a town house in the Grand-Place which dated back at least to the first half of the 16th century. At that time the town has still part of the County of Flanders. The town house was burnt down by Spanish troops serving under Alexander Farnese, Duke of Parma on 30 June 1582 during the Eighty Years' War.

The aldermen decided to commission a new town hall. The site selected for the new building was in the centre of the Grand-Place. It was designed in the Flemish Renaissance style, built in red brick with stone finishings and was completed in 1589. The design involved three parallel halls with stepped gables at both ends, together with a tall octagonal tower surmounted by an ogee-shaped dome and a spire. The old town hall survived for over two centuries, through the incorporation of the town into the Kingdom of France under the Treaties of Nijmegen in 1678, until it was burnt down during a major fire on 11 February 1801.

The town council led by the mayor, Philippe-Jacques Revel, again decided to commission a new town hall. In the meantime they used temporary accommodation in the Couvent des Augustins (Convent of the Augustinians). The site they selected for the new building was on the northeastern side of the Grand-Place. Construction got underway in May 1806. It was designed by the departmental architect, Sieur Drapier, in the neoclassical style, built in ashlar stone and was completed in 1820.

The design involved an arcade of 11 openings with imposts and archivolts on the ground floor, and a huge portico formed by 12 Doric order columns supporting an entablature spanning the first and second floors. A clock supported by scrolls was installed at roof level in 1836. However, unlike other town halls in the area, there was no lantern. Internally, the principal room was the Salle du Conseil (council chamber). Parts of the courtyard at the rear of the building were damaged by German shelling in April 1918 during the Battle of the Lys, part of the First World War.
