= Godewaersvelde =

- Commune
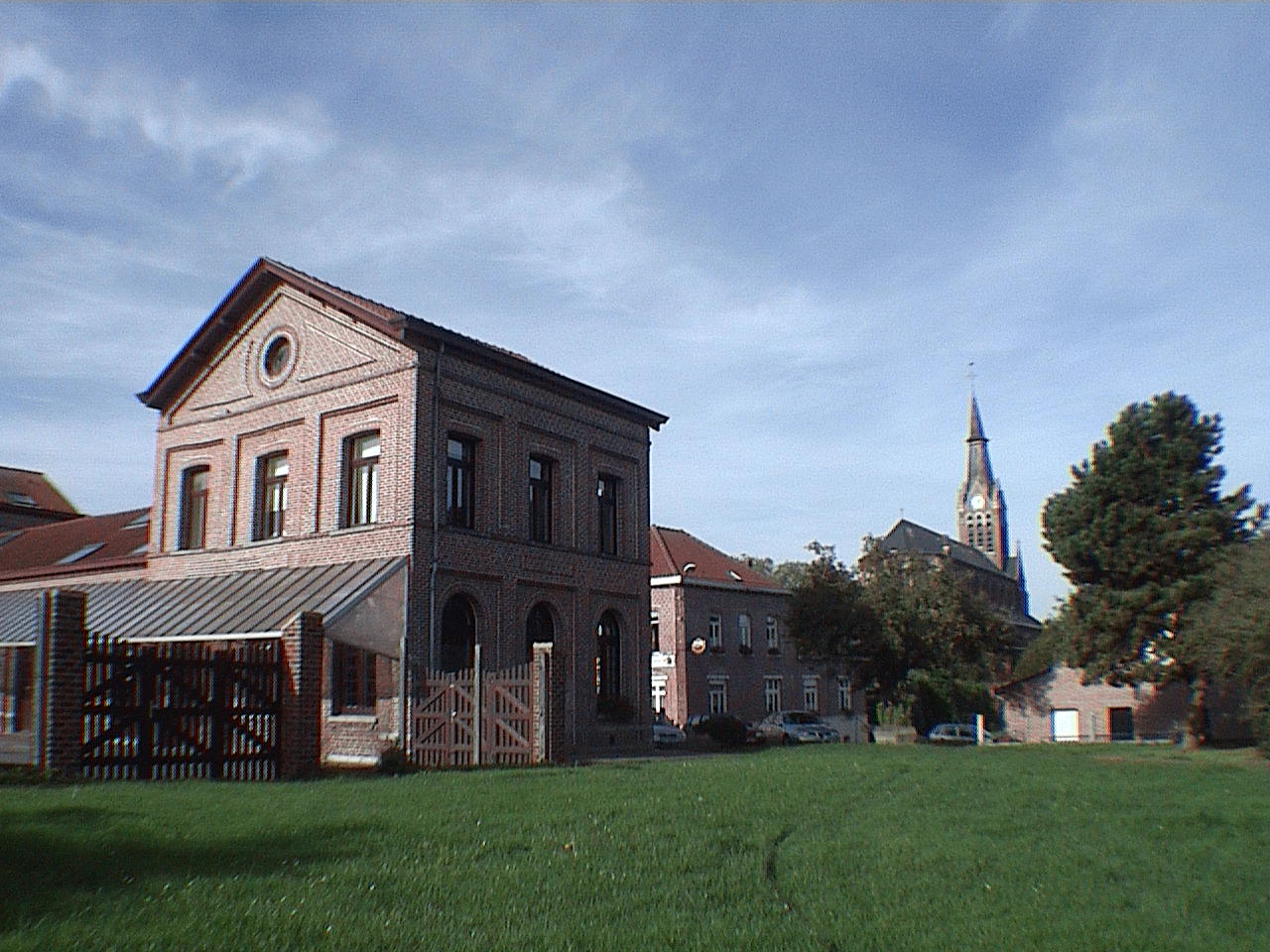
- The old railway station and church

- Coat of arms
- Location of Godewaersvelde
- Location within France Location within Hauts-de-France
- Coordinates: 50°47′41″N 2°38′39″E
- Country: France
- Region: Hauts-de-France
- Department: Nord
- Arrondissement: Dunkerque
- Canton: Bailleul
- Intercommunality: CA Cœur de Flandre

Government
  - Mayor (2020–2026): Antoine Vermeulen
- Area^{1}: 11.89 km^{2} (4.59 sq mi)
- Elevation: 41 m (135 ft)
- Highest elevation: 163 m (535 ft)
- Lowest elevation: 27 m (89 ft)
- Population (2023): 2,024
  - Density: 170.2/km^{2} (440.9/sq mi)
- Demonym: Godewaersveldois (es)
- Time zone: UTC+01:00 (CET)
  - Summer (DST): UTC+02:00 (CEST)
- INSEE/Postal code: 59262 /59270
- ^{1} French Land Register data, which excludes lakes, ponds, glaciers > 1 km^{2} (0.386 sq mi or 247 acres) and river estuaries.

Godewaersvelde (French pronunciation: [ɡɔdvaʁsvɛld]; French Flemish: Godsvelde; Dutch: Godewaarsvelde) is a commune in the Nord department in northern France, near the Belgian border.

== Location ==
Godewaersvelde is in northern France along the Belgian border and is in the heart of Flanders, less than half an hour from Lille and Dunkirk. Godewaersvelde covers 1189 hectares or nearly 12 square kilometers and is crossed by several county roads: the R & D 948 which connects at the A25 interchange in Poperinge, 139 R & D that leads to Boeschèpe and Eecke, DR 18, which connects Route Méteren to Poperinge.

== Population ==
Historical population
Year	Pop.	±% p.a.
1968	1,798	—
1975	1,665	−1.09%
1982	1,713	+0.41%
1990	1,738	+0.18%
1999	1,927	+1.15%
2007	1,964	+0.24%
2012	2,016	+0.52%
2017	2,051	+0.34%
2023	2,024	−0.22%
Source: INSEE

== Heraldry ==
Arms of Godewaersvelde	The arms of Godewaersvelde are blazoned : Barry gules and vair.

== Etymology and evolution of name ==
The name of the commune originally meant either "Godafritha's Heath" or "Godefried Fields", in old Flemish/Dutch. In modern French Flemish (Frans-Vlaams) it is Godsvelde, or Godewaersvelde (in the Franse Westhoek area of Nord Department). The modern Dutch name is Godewaarsvelde.

The name has been recorded as:

- 1295-1296: Gaudefroit camp
- 1300: Godeverdesvelde
- 1318: Godefroichamp
- 1918: Goedesversvelde

During the First World War, British soldiers nicknamed the town "Gerty Wears Velvet", and "God". A false etymology, dismissed by linguists and historians, has claimed that Godewaersvelde meant "God bless our fields".

== Famous people ==
- The painter Nicolas Ruyssen (born in Hazebrouck on 26 September 1757) founded the Mont des Cats abbey. He died in Godewaersvelde on 7 May 1826 and is buried in the abbey church.

== See also ==
- Communes of the Nord department
- Mont des Cats

== Gallery ==
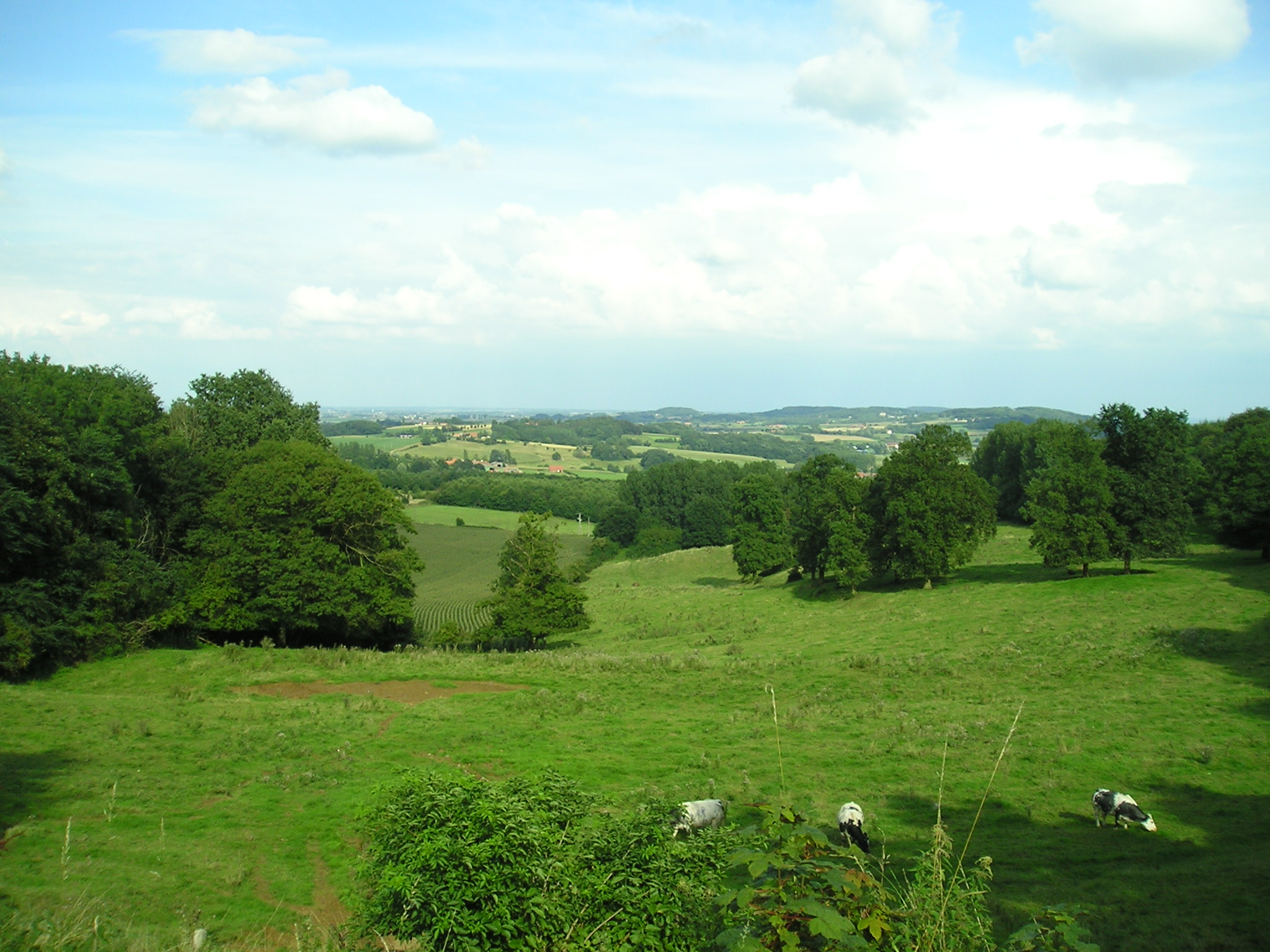
Mont des Cats

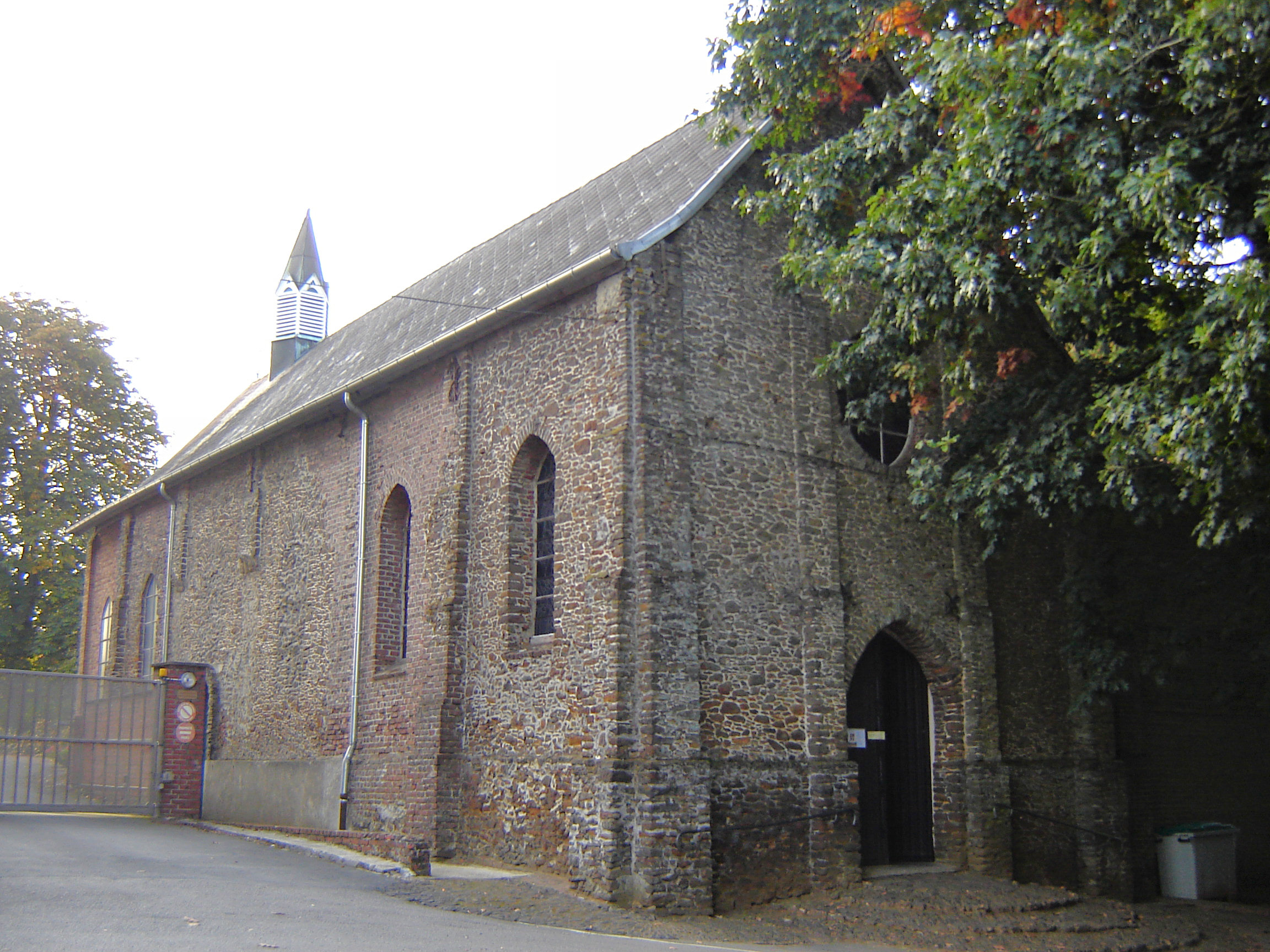
Chapel of Saint Bernard of the Abbaye du Mont des Cats

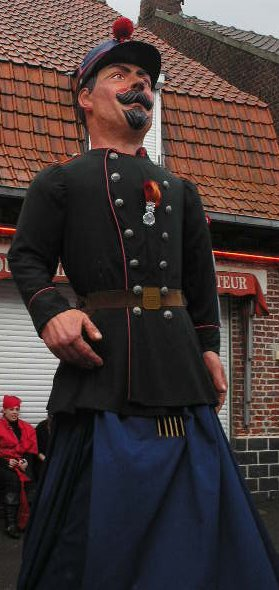
"Henri le douanier", giant
