= Westvleteren Brewery =

Brewery in Vleteren, Belgium

Coordinates: 50°53′42″N 2°43′18″E

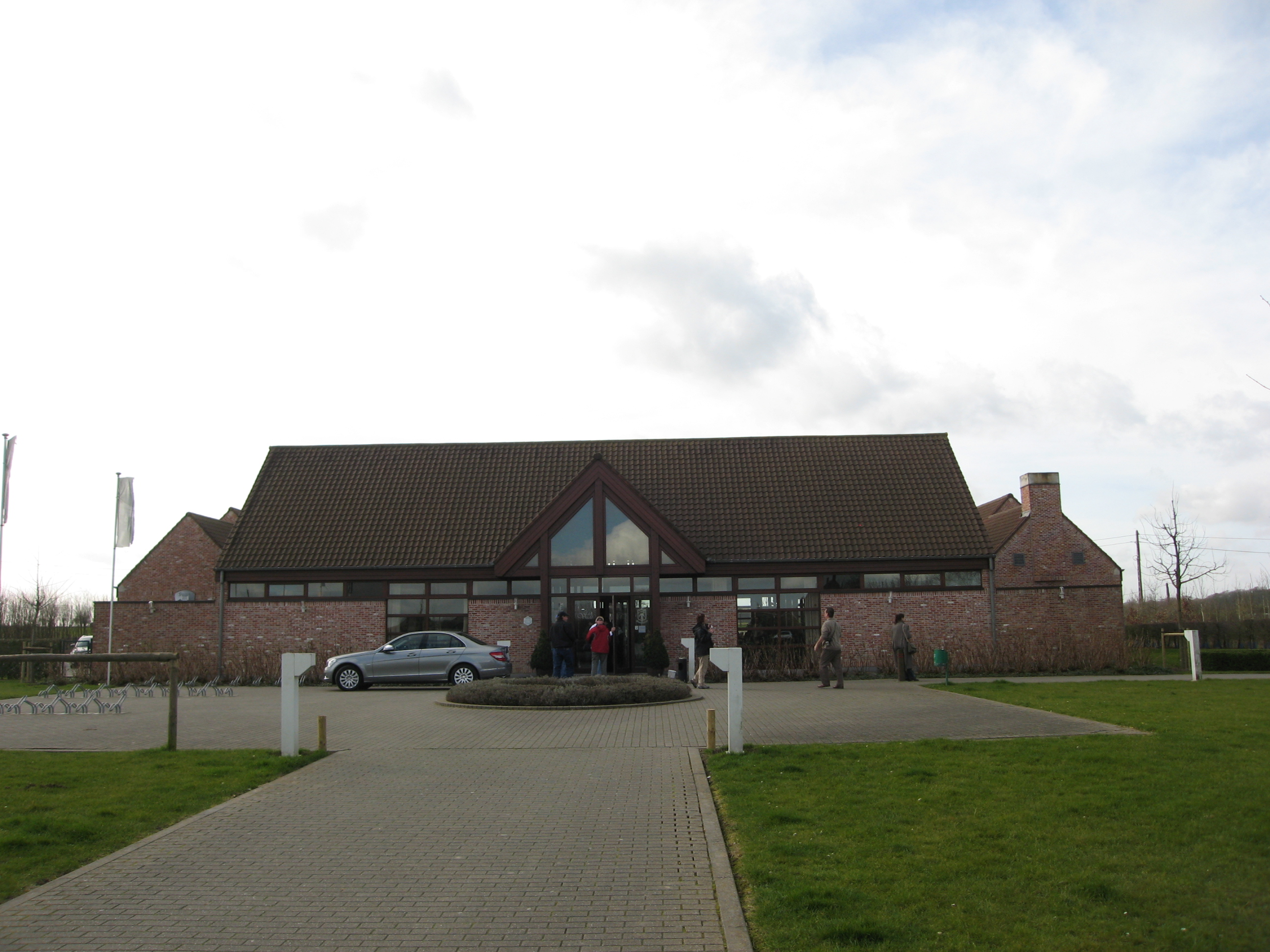
- Westvleteren visitor center
- Industry: Trappist brewery
- Founded: 1838
- Headquarters: Vleteren, Belgium
- Products: Beer
- Production output: 475 kL

Westvleteren (Dutch: Brouwerij Westvleteren) is a brewery founded in 1838 at the Trappist Abbey of Saint Sixtus in Vleteren, Belgium. The brewery brews three traditional Trappist beers in small quantities to support the operations and philanthropic causes of the abbey. The brewery is referred to by several names in Dutch and English, including Westvleteren Brewery and the Saint-Sixtus Abbey brewery.

== History ==
The Saint-Sixtus Abbey was founded in 1831 by Trappist monks from the abbey at Mont des Cats in France. Records show that a small volume of beer was brewed at the abbey in 1838 and in 1839 the abbey received a brewing license from King Leopold I. In 1850, a group of monks left Saint-Sixtus abbey and founded Scourmont Abbey, which also brews a Trappist beer under the brand name Chimay.

The brewery continued to operate during both World Wars albeit at a reduced capacity. In World War I the abbey acted as a hospital for allied troops and in World War II the area was occupied by German forces. During this time it was the only Trappist brewery to retain its original copper brewing vessels, with materials requisitioned from other breweries by German occupation forces. Beer was only served to guests at the abbey until 1931, after which its beer was sold to the general public.

Between 1946 and 1992, the St. Bernardus Brewery in Watou was granted a license to brew beer under the St. Sixtus name. Today, St. Bernardus brews beers of similar styles but under their brand name. In 1992, the brewery was modernised.

Brewing operations are carried out by the monks from the abbey, with a small team of secular workers for manual labour tasks. Of the 26 monks that reside at the abbey, five run the brewery, with an additional five who assist during bottling.

== Commercial orientations ==
As with other Trappist breweries, beer is brewed and sold to financially support the monastery and other philanthropic causes. Whilst the brewery is a business by definition (its purpose is to make money), it does not exist for pure profit motives and they do not advertise. The monks have repeatedly stated enough beer is brewed to run the monastery, and production volumes will not be increased to meet market demand. During World War II, the brewery stopped supplying wholesalers, and since then they only sell to individual buyers at the brewery and visitors' centre cafe. On the opening of the new brewery, the Father Abbott said "We are not brewers. We are monks. We brew beer to be able to afford being monks."

== Beers ==
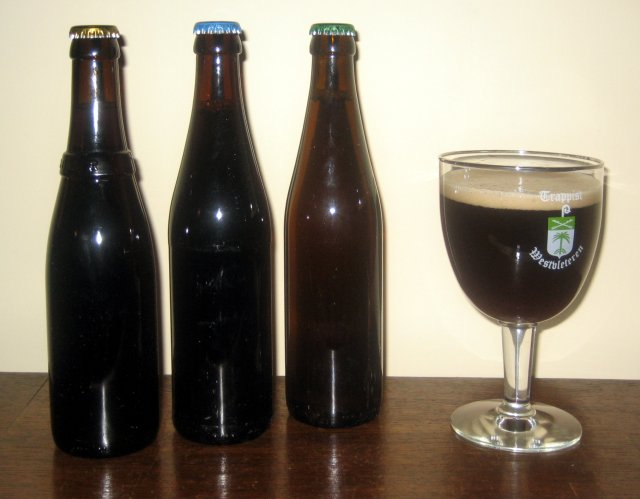
The Westvleteren beers. Poured in the glass is one of them, the 12°

The brewery brews three beers:

- Westvleteren Blonde (green cap), a pale ale, 5.8% ABV, introduced on 10 June 1999.
- Westvleteren 8 (blue cap) (formerly Extra), a dubbel, 8% ABV.
- Westvleteren 12 (yellow cap) (formerly Abt), a quadrupel, 10.2% ABV, introduced in 1940.

Until 1999, the brewery also produced a 6.2% ABV dark beer and a lighter 4° which served as the monks' table beer, but these were replaced by the Blonde. The 8 and 12 are bottle conditioned and considered to have a long shelf life, with some drinkers preferring the taste when the beers have been stored for several years. The ingredients are yeast, hops, malt, candi sugar and water.

Historically the beers were identified only by the colour of the bottle cap. Labels were introduced in August 2022.

== Availability ==
Buyers were originally limited to ten 24-bottle crates of the beer per car, but as the beer increased in popularity, this was first reduced to five, then to three and now to two or one crates. For the Westvleteren 12 in 2009, it was limited to one case. When making an order now, the type and quantity of beer available for sale are revealed. Sales are limited to one order every 30 days per person per license plate and phone number. The beer must be reserved online through the abbey's website, with registration weeks before the planned pick up date. The online system has replaced the "beerphone" in 2019. The monks do not sell beer to individuals who drive up to the abbey hoping to purchase beer. The reason for this is to eliminate commercial reselling, and hence give all visitors a chance to purchase the product.

The current production is 4750 hectolitres (60,000 cases) per year, and has remained the same since 1946.

Aside from the brewery itself, the only other official sale point for the beer is the abbey-owned In de Vrede, a cafe and visitor's centre opposite the abbey. All beers can be bought there for immediate consumption or take-away, depending on availability (however, prices are higher than at the abbey). Often there is no beer available at the shop. The shop also sells cheeses made at the abbey, yeast tabs (not yeast to make beer but dead yeast for health) and other Trappist products.

Westvleteren XII with gift packaging and glasses

Buyers of the beer receive a receipt with Niet verder verkopen ("Do not resell") printed on it. The abbey is very much against resale of their beer, and it is their wish that the beer be only commercially available at the two abbey-owned official sale points. Therefore, any Westvleteren beer offered for sale anywhere else in the world is a grey- or black market item, as there are no wholesalers in existence that supply the beer. The abbey is actively working to eliminate the illicit sales, and generally only agrees to media interviews to spread their message against drinking illicitly sold Westvleteren beer.

The brewery and the Belgian retailer Colruyt put a gift pack (6 bottles of Westvleteren 12, plus 2 glasses) on sale, available only in exchange for promotional coupons printed in selected media. The goal of the sales was to increase income to provide funds for urgent and immediate renovations at the monastery. Available from 2 November 2011, sales were limited to 93,000 packs, at 25 Euro per pack. All earnings of the sale were to be put towards the renovation project. This was the first time the brewery had done something like this.

On 4 November 2011 it was announced that 7760 gift packs (each containing 6 bottles of Westvleteren 12 and 2 glasses) would be imported by US-based Shelton Brothers, starting in April 2012. During a Shelton Brothers beer festival in June 2012, the gift packs were then made available to attendees at the price of $85. The original arrangement also listed Manneken-Brussels Imports Austin, Texas, as an additional distributor for the western states, but the Manneken-Brussels deal fell through in May 2012.

On 12 December 2012 gift packs were briefly made available in the US. As with the previous release, the gift packs contained 6 bottles of Westvleteren 12 and 2 decorated glasses. Distributed to selected locations across 22 states, they retailed at the regulated price of $84.99.

A six-pack (at CAD$76.85) was sold out on 12 December 2012 at various LCBO locations in Ontario.

== International reputation ==
Many beer drinkers rank Westvleteren 12 among their favourite beers. The 8 and the Blonde also rank highly on beer-rating websites.

In June 2005, when Westvleteren 12 was ranked as "Best Beer in the World" on Ratebeer.com, news organizations followed this up and articles appeared in the international press, highlighting the beer ranking and the unusual business policies. In 2014 it was again rated best beer in the world by Ratebeer.com for the fourth year in a row.

Following these events, interest in Westvleteren's output increased and stories appeared of the abbey's stock being low, forcing the monks to reduce the amount of beer sold to each customer. In an interview, monk Mark Bode explained that the abbey had no intention of increasing its production, despite demand: "We make the beer to live but we do not live for beer."

Despite the popularity, the monks of St Sixtus have continued to decline almost all interview and visit requests, and have not enjoyed all of the attention they have received. Non-monastic visitors to the abbey are usually turned away, instead being directed to the visitor's centre opposite where there is information about the abbey and brewery. They have stated their desire to only produce as much beer as needed to finance the community.
