= St. Sixtus' Abbey =

Monastery in West Flanders, Belgium

Coordinates: 50.895942°N 2.721262°E

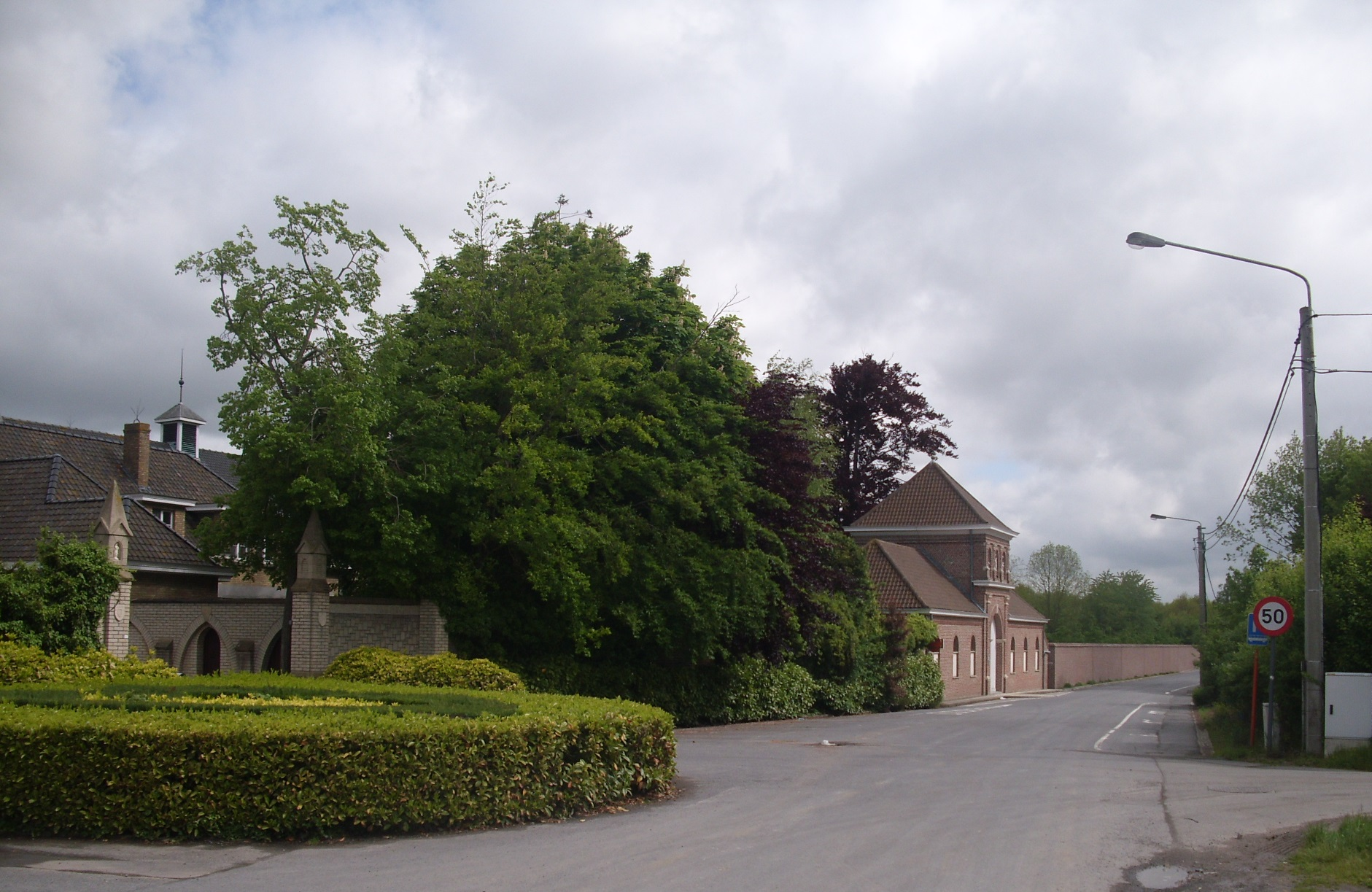
St. Sixtus' Abbey

St. Sixtus' Abbey, Westvleteren (Dutch: Sint-Sixtusabdij Westvleteren), which belongs to the Cistercians of Strict Observance, or Trappists, is a Roman Catholic abbey located in Westvleteren, in the Belgian Province of West Flanders. The abbey is famous for its spiritual life, characterised by prayer, reading, and manual work, the three basic elements of Trappist life. It has also a reputation for its brewery, one of several producers of Trappist beer in Belgium.

== History ==
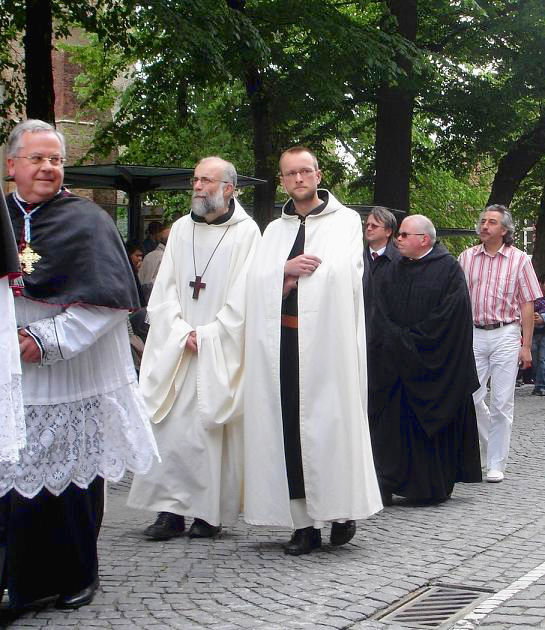
Procession of the Holy Blood in Bruges: Abbot Van Hecke with one of his monks

=== 9th to 18th centuries ===
The earliest traces of a monastic presence at the location of the present day abbey date back to 1260, although the Cella Beborna, which is mentioned in a deed of 806 (from the abbey of Saint-Omer), was probably located in the same area (known at that time as Fletrinio). From 1260 to 1355 there was a small community of nuns on the side of the Catsberg. That site was abandoned, but between 1610 and 1784 a monastery of the Bridgettines (the Order of the Most Holy Saviour) was located on what is called "Fathers' Corner".

=== 19th century ===
In 1831 the hermit Jan-Baptist Victoor was joined by a prior and a few monks in the woods of Saint Sixtus, and this group developed into the later Trappist abbey of Saint Sixtus in Westvleteren. In 1838 the Westvleteren Brewery was founded inside the abbey precinct. In 1839 a primary school was established and in 1840 the old church of the priory was built. In 1850, a group of monks from Westvleteren founded Scourmont Abbey on the barren plateau of Scourmont near Chimay. In 1871 the priory was granted the status of abbey by Pope Pius IX. Between 1875 and 1878 a model farm was developed as an example for the region.

=== 20th century ===
During World War I the abbey provided shelter to many refugees from the region and in addition almost 400,000 allied soldiers lived in and around the abbey. World War II was a difficult time for the monastery in several respects. After the war, in 1945, the abbot decided to reduce the capacity of the brewery to produce only 4,800 hectolitres a year. In 1964 the guesthouse was built, and a new abbey church was added in 1968.

== Sources ==
- Monks of Westmalle Abbey, 1904: Geschiedenis der Abdij van het Heilig Hart van Jezus te Westmalle (p. 135). Westmalle
- Van Remoortere, J., 1990: Ippa's Abdijengids voor Belgie (pp. 418–420). Lannoo
- Johannes Lootens, 2012: "De Sint-Sixtusabdij van Westvleteren - geschiedenis"; Davidsfonds
