= Alvinne =

Brewery in Zwevegem, Belgium

Coordinates: 50°51′01″N 3°13′46″E

Picobrouwerij Alvinne
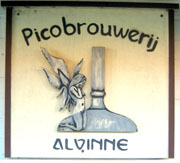
- The brewery logo is shown on the building housing the Picobrouwerij Alvinne
- Industry: Alcoholic beverage
- Founded: 2003
- Headquarters: Moen (Zwevegem), Belgium
- Products: Beer
- Owner: Davy Spiessens, Glenn Castelein, Marc De Keukeleire
- Website: www.alvinne.com

Alvinne is a small brewery in the hamlet of Moen near the Belgian city of Zwevegem, founded in 2002.

The brewery creates a range of beers, including versions of 'traditional' Belgian styles such as strong golden ales, abbey-style beers and saison, as well as original creations that cross stylistic boundaries and beers inspired by styles from outside their home country like imperial stout. Alvinne has gained international attention.

== Name ==
The name of the brewery derives from a female spirit, Witte Wieven, of local folk tales.

Their earlier name included the term "Picobrouwerij", a play on the scientific terminology for very small objects. It is based on the fact that the brewery's production is smaller by several orders of magnitude than that of a typical microbrewery. The prefix Pico- is combined with "brouwerij", the Dutch and Flemish term for brewery.

== History ==
At the beginning of Alvinne's existence in 2002, they brewed their beers at the De Graal brewery premises in Brakel, East Flanders, later moving to their own premises in the town of Ingelmunster proper in 2003. In 2006 they relocated again to their current facility in Heule.

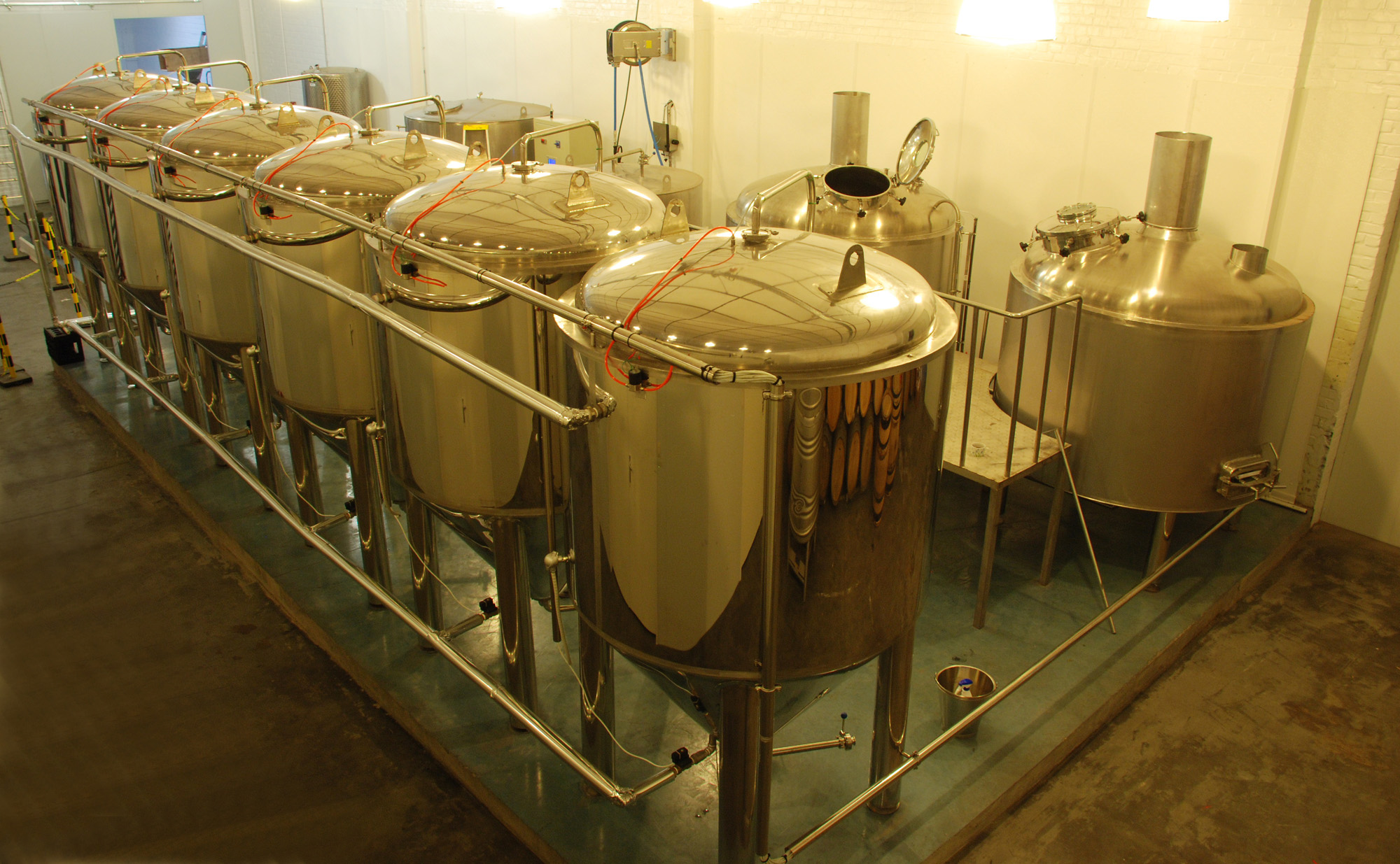
The new brewery at Moen

The brewery makes beer about three times per week to make up the annual volume. A brew kettle of 600 liter capacity is used, but batch volume is restricted to 300 liters for the stronger beers due to the limited size of the mash/lauter tun. There are four 1000 liter steel fermentation tanks.

The Alvinne products are generally only available in 33cl bottles (of the short, squat variety popularly associated with beers like Duvel) and on tap. All of the Alvinne beers are unfiltered and unpasteurized. The brewery lists most ingredients of their beers on the label. English and Czech hop varieties are most common in their recipes, and the beers produced combine traditional Belgian brewing techniques such as the use of sugar and spices with the methods and styles of other nations. The large quantity of beer styles in production is particularly uncommon for a brewery of such modest size, as is the fact that the diverse brews are created using different commercially available yeast strains (as opposed a single 'house' strain) to obtain specific flavors and aromas.

== Beers ==
- Alvinne Blond (6.0% ABV) A blond "Special" ale, this is brewed with Pilsner and wheat malt, crystallized sugar and English hops of the Fuggles Northern Brewer varieties. 33 IBU.
- Alvinne Bruin (6.5% ABV) A brown ale made with Pilsner and 5 specialty malts, light candi sugar and Goldings, Hallertau and Northern Brewer hops. 32 IBU.
- Alvinne Blond Extra (7.1% ABV) A dry-hopped strong golden ale. Brewed with Pilsner, wheat and caramel malts, crystallized sugar and English hops of the Fuggles, Target and East Kent Goldings varieties. 30 IBU.
- Alvinne Tripel (8.7% ABV) Brewed in the Abbey Tripel style, this dark gold ale is made with Pilsner, wheat, caramel and Vienna malts, light candi sugar and vanilla, and hopped with Fuggles, Challenger and East Kent Goldings to 33 IBU. This beer was launched in March 2005 at the Zythos Beer Festival.
- Balthazar (9.0% ABV) The first of three Christmas beers named after the Three Wise Men of Bible story. The choice of name reflects the popularity in Belgium of the pre-Christmas holiday of Epiphany, or Three Kings Day. Balthazar is a dark reddish-brown strong ale made spicy with the addition of coriander, cardamom and ginger. Brewed with Pilsner and 4 special malts, dark candi sugar and the spices listed above, it is hopped with Challenger and East Kent Goldings to 28 IBU. The spiciness is accentuated by the use of the commercial version of the Rochefort yeast strain.
- Melchior (11.0% ABV) The second of the Christmas beers. A very strong ale described by the brewery as being in the barleywine style. Made with Pilsner, wheat, Munich and aromatic malts, crystallized sugar and mustard seeds, this beer was released in 2005 at the popular beer café Pado in Tielt. Bittered to 60 IBU with Challenger and East Kent Goldings, it is fermented with a Belgian Strong Ale yeast.
- Gaspar (8.0% ABV) The third of the Christmas beers. An extremely bitter strong golden ale formulated to exceed 115 IBU. Brewed with Pilsner, pale, wheat and chocolate malts and hopped with Saaz hops, Hallertau and East Kent Goldings. Uses a Belgian Trappist yeast strain.
- Podge Belgian Imperial Stout (10.5% ABV) Brewed at the request of English beer connoisseur Chris "Podge" Pollard (a CAMRA activist and craft beer authority), this strong stout is black in color and has a rich, silky mouthfeel and slightly spicy flavor, but very low carbonation and no head at all "for the English taste". Made with Pilsner plus six other malt varieties, crystallized sugar and dark candi sugar, and hopped with English Challenger and East Kent Goldings hops. After taste-testing of multiple strains, the Wyeast Irish Ale yeast variety was selected for this brew.
- n Maurootje Lauwse Saison (7.0% ABV) This example of the Belgian Farmhouse Ale style began as a final project recipe created by one of Glenn Castelein's brewing students, William Roelens, who named it after his grandson Mauro, who lives in the town of Lauwe. The Alvinne brewers were so impressed by this beer that they added it to their lineup with Roelens' permission.
- Dertig (8.0% ABV) A limited-edition strong golden ale brewed to celebrate the 30th anniversary of the Hotel Erasmus in Brugge and available only at the hotel restaurant's tap. The name means "thirty" in Dutch and Flemish.

In addition to marketing their products under their own names, the brewery also follows the Belgian practice of offering "label beers" (Etiketbieren) for pubs, restaurants and other establishments. In this practice batches of the beer are produced and given a special label with the name and design of the client. These are typically the same beer recipes as the regular line, merely issued under a different title. Brewer Glenn Castelein also teaches an annual brewing course.

Alvinne has made its brewing apparatus available for other projects, including the "Kroegbier" line of brews made by the owners of the 't Kroegske craft beer pub in nearby Emelgem.

== See also ==
- European Beer Consumers' Union
