= Untappd =

Geosocial networking service for rating beers

Untappd Inc.
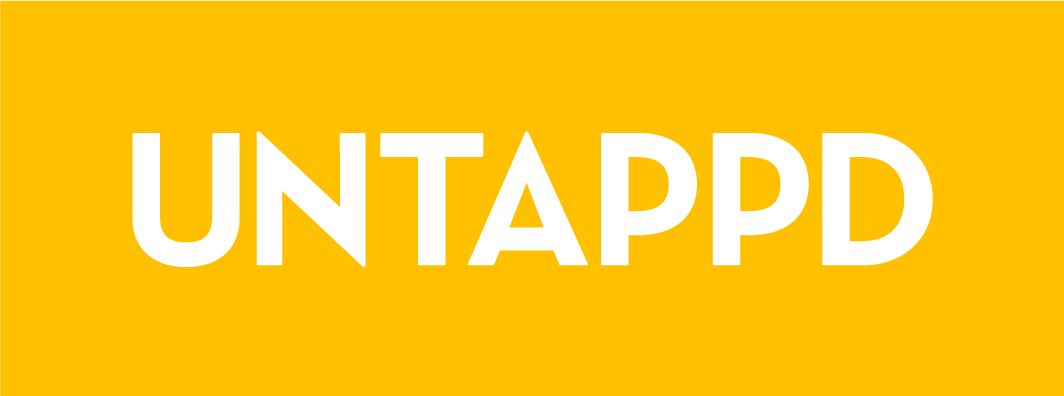
- Company type: Social networking service
- Founded: October 22, 2010; 16 years ago
- Headquarters: Wilmington, North Carolina
- Owner: Next Glass
- Key people: Greg Avola; Tim Mather; Kurt Taylor; Trace Smith; Ty Graham
- Products: Untappd, Untappd for Business, Untappd Marketplace
- Employees: 125 (2017)
- Users: 820,000 (2020)
- Launched: October 22, 2010; 16 years ago

Untappd

Stable release(s) [±]
- iOS: 4.5.10 / July 30, 2025; 15 months ago
- Android: 4.5.10 / July 29, 2025; 15 months ago
- Operating system: iOS, Android

Untappd is a geosocial networking service and mobile phone application founded by Greg Avola and Tim Mather that allows its users to check in as they drink beers and share these check-ins and their locations with their friends. It incorporates aspects of gamification.

Untappd provides a platform for users to rate the beer they are consuming, earn badges, share pictures of their beers, review tap lists from nearby venues, see what beers their friends are drinking, comment on checked-in beers, and ask the app to suggest similar beverages. In 2016, an updated version of the application allowed users to find a beer by scanning its barcode

Untappd uses Foursquare for its location services.

== Badges ==
As a user checks in different beers, they earn badges. These badges consist of local badges, beer badges, venue badges, and special badges. Local badges are earned from checking in at specific locations participating in an Untappd for Business promotion. Beer badges are earned based upon how many unique beers a user has checked in, what country or region the beer is produced, what style the beer is, or various actions by the user, such as checking in the same beer multiple times in a row. Venue badges are earned for checking in at different locations like breweries, restaurants, or festivals. Special badges are earned from checking in a specific beer as part of a promotion or checking in on a specific holiday.

== History ==
Untappd started in 2010 at Father's Office in Santa Monica, California. On January 17, 2014, it was announced that Untappd had passed the 1 million user mark and by April 2016, they had 3.2 million users.

On January 15, 2016, Untappd announced that it would become a subsidiary of Next Glass, a beer and wine rating and suggesting application. Both companies indicated their applications will remain independent, but will benefit from increased data integrations.

It was included in the "Top 50 Apps of the Year" of 2016 by Time.

At the start of the COVID-19 pandemic on March 25, 2020, the Untappd at Home campaign was launched, so users could check in beers from a global home location.

As of September 4, 2020 Untappd, reported 820,000 unique users checked-in at least once from almost 180 different countries.

== See also ==
- Beer rating
