= Beer rating =

Website or system evaluating beer

Beer rating is the process of assessment and evaluation of beer by use of a points-based system. The process is similar to that used in beer judging competitions, such as those organised by the Beer Judge Certification Program (BJCP) in America, though the participants are consumers so it may be termed a score-rated recommendation system. The rating system may be a simple 5 marks, and may be organized by a beer store or pub chain such as Wetherspoon in the UK; or it may be more involved, such as the systems used by beer rating websites such as BeerAdvocate and RateBeer. A 2017 study considered beer ratings to be "a relatively unbiased and informative source of social information".

== Websites ==
=== BeerAdvocate ===
Beeradvocate logo

BeerAdvocate is an online beer rating site which also rates bars and beer stores. It was founded in 1996, by brothers Todd and Jason Alström, and is based in Boston, Massachusetts, and Denver, Colorado, United States.

As of November 2013, BeerAdvocate's database contained about 3,783,570 ratings of about 100,976 beers.

As of February 2020, BeerAdvocate is owned by Next Glass, which is also the parent company of Untappd.

=== RateBeer ===
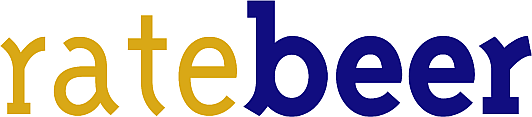
old Ratebeer logo

RateBeer was founded in May 2000 by Bill Buchanan as a forum for beer drinkers to exchange information and share opinions of beer. In June 2000, the Canadian beer writer Josh Oakes joined RateBeer and eventually became editor-in-chief. In June 2001, the web-site consultant Joe Tucker joined, eventually assuming full ownership of RateBeer.

In August 2006, RateBeer's annual press-release of the highest rated beers on the site caused concern when various world media reported that supplies of Westvleteren 12 were sold out due to being listed as the "Best beer in the world" on the site.

RateBeer had over 4.5 million ratings in 2013. Of more than 470,000 beers, from over 26,000 breweries.

In June 2017, it was revealed that Anheuser-Busch InBev had acquired a minority stake in RateBeer via the incubator ZX Ventures. This purchase led to concerns that the company had a conflict of interest, citing that the site could present bias towards Anheuser-Busch InBev brands, that there was a lack of transparency over the role of the company's investment, and that it could potentially gain access to customer data. Several breweries attempted to demand that their listings be removed from the website. Executive director Joe Tucker stated that "Nothing about this investment changes who we are and what we provide. We will just be able to give our community of beer drinkers an even better experience".

As of February 2019, RateBeer is fully owned by ZX Ventures, the global growth and innovation arm of AB InBev. On December 18, 2024, it was announced that RateBeer was to cease operations on February 1, 2025.

== See also ==
- Untappd
