= Vleteren =

- Municipality
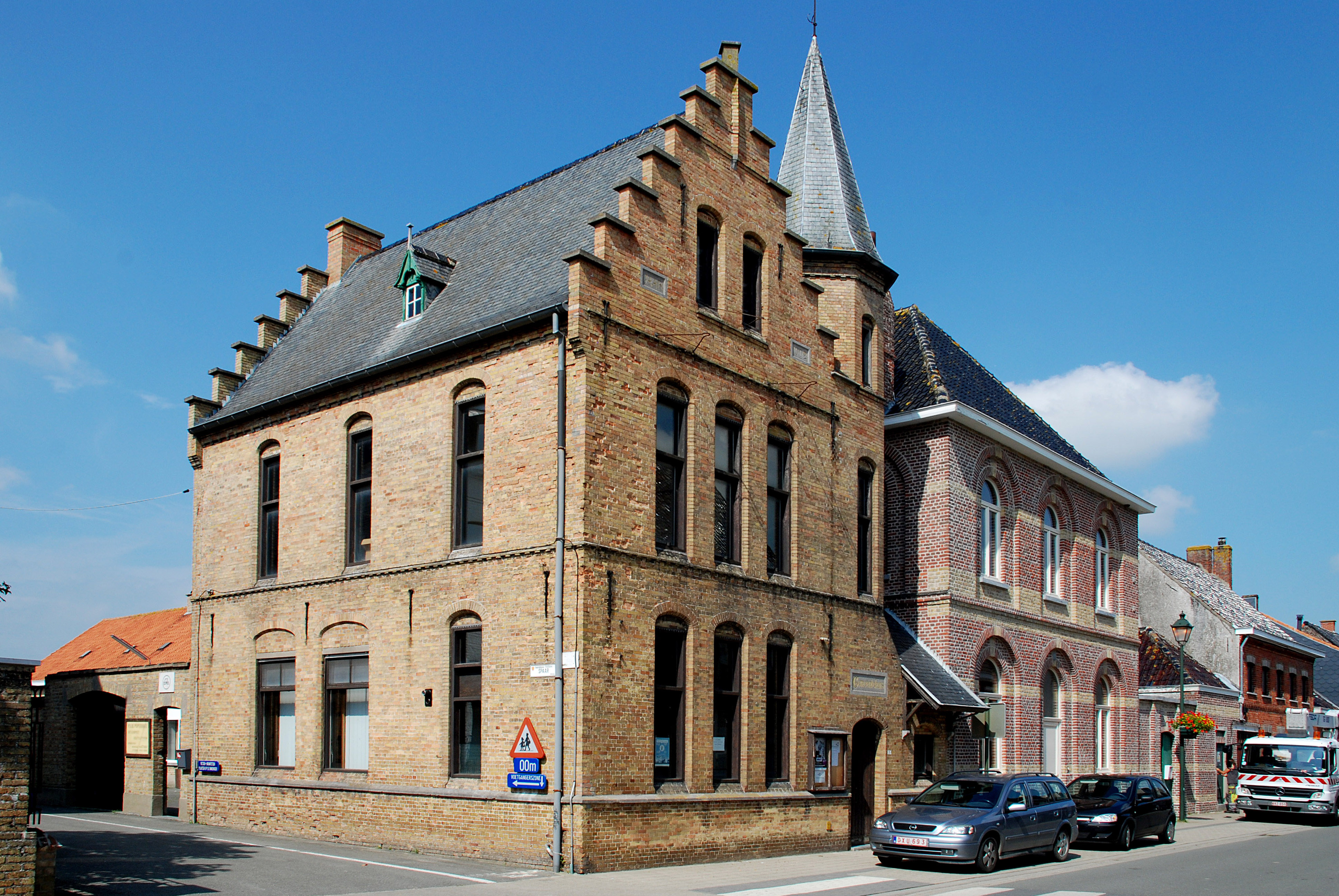

- Flag Coat of arms

- Location of west flanders in West Flanders
- Interactive map of Vleteren
- Location in Belgium
- Coordinates: 50°56′N 02°44′E
- Country: Belgium
- Community: Flemish Community
- Region: Flemish Region
- Province: West Flanders
- Arrondissement: Ypres

Government
  - Mayor: Stephan Mourisse (Open Vld)
  - Governing party: Landelijke Volkspartij (LVP)

Area
  - Total: 38.58 km^{2} (14.90 sq mi)

Population (2018-01-01)
  - Total: 3,659
  - Density: 94.84/km^{2} (245.6/sq mi)
- Postal codes: 8640
- NIS code: 33041
- Area codes: 057
- Website: www.vleteren.be

Vleteren (Dutch pronunciation: [ˈvleːtərə(n)]) is a municipality located in the Belgian province of West Flanders. The municipality comprises the towns of Oostvleteren, Westvleteren and Woesten. On January 1, 2006, Vleteren had a total population of 3,636. The total area is 38.15 km^{2} which gives a population density of 95 inhabitants per km^{2}.

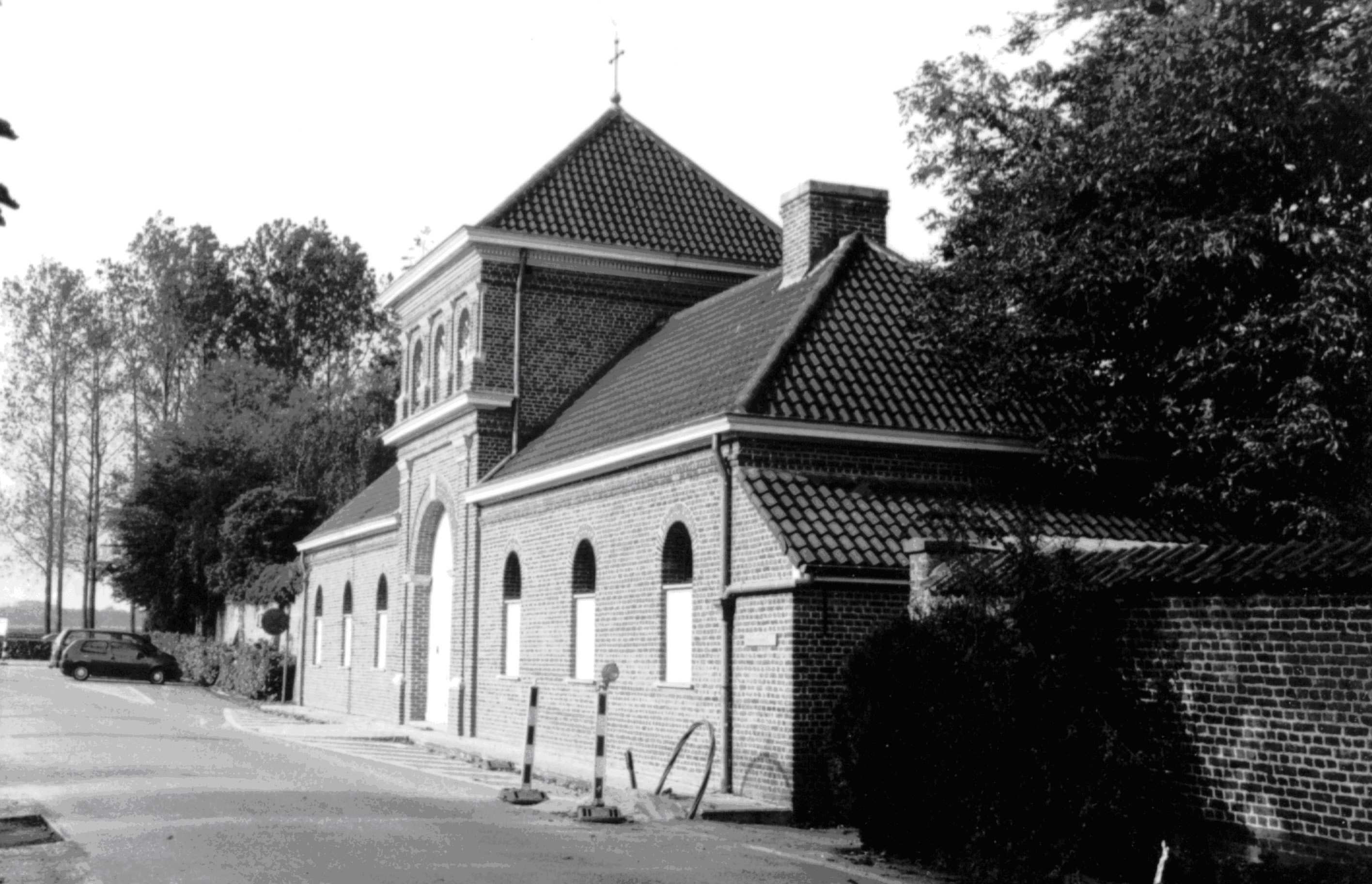
Saint-Sixtus Abbey in Westvleteren

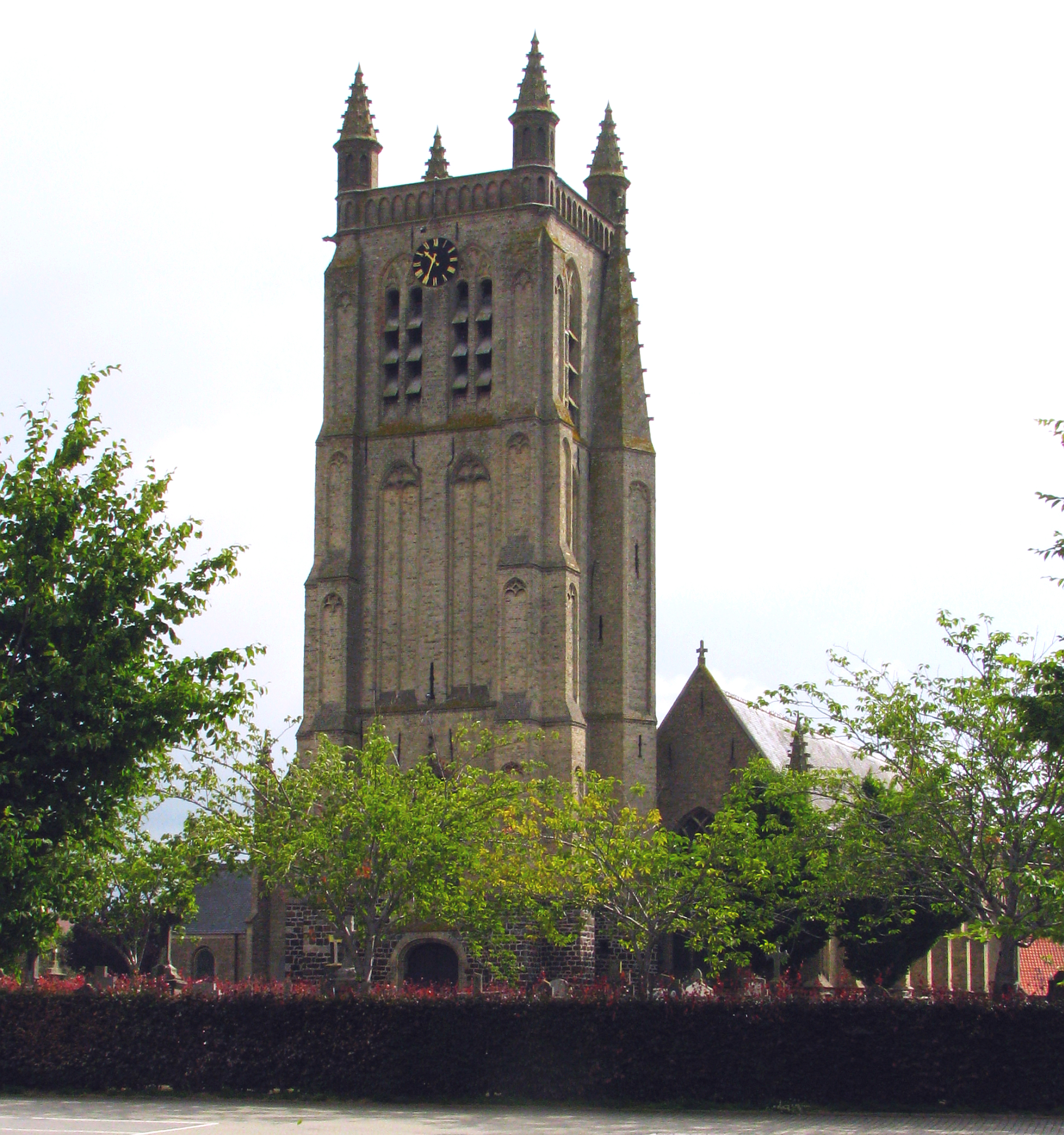
From the place Woesten: the St. Rictrudis church from southwest, rebuilt in 1923 (origin in the 15th century)

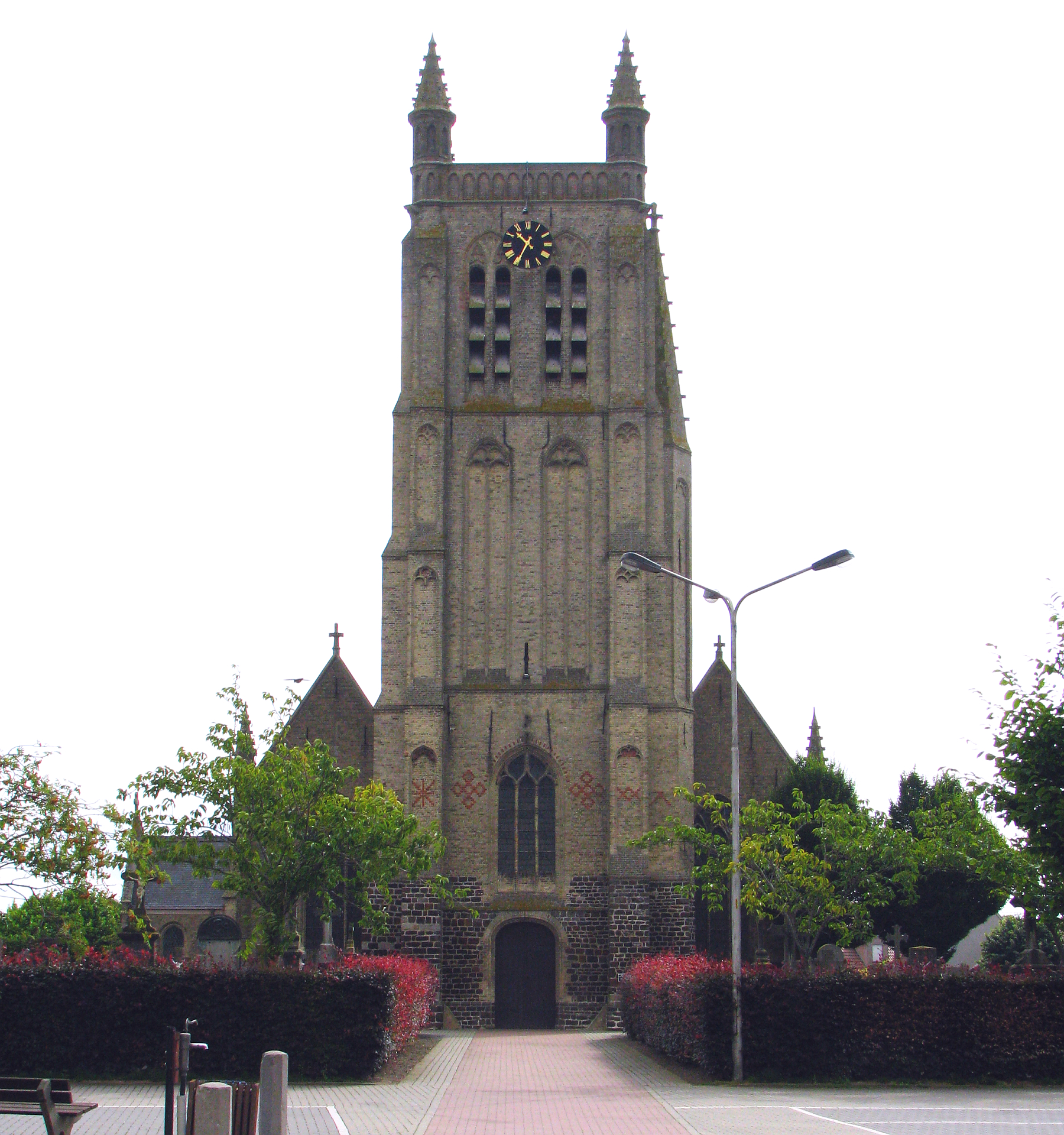
Place Woesten: Entrance portal of St. Rictrudis Church (from the west), the church had no spire
