= European Beer Consumers' Union =

Consumer organisation founded in Bruges, Belgium

Organisation logo

The European Beer Consumers' Union (EBCU) is a consumer organisation founded in 1990 in Bruges, Belgium, by three national beer organisations: CAMRA (United Kingdom), Objectieve Bierproevers (Belgium) and PINT (Netherlands).

== History ==
In 2003, Objectieve Bierproevers was replaced by Zythos.

In 2008, the member organisations signed up to a constitution which defined the formal aims and structure and the role of traditional beer as a "prime component of European culture, history and daily life".

Beoir, an Irish consumer organisation setup in 2010 to promote Irish craft brewing and microbreweries, became the organisation's 13th member in 2012.

In 2012, Terry Lock, chairman since 1999, retired and Henri Reuchlin from the Netherlands was elected to replace him. Bo Jensen from Denmark replaced Henri Reuchlin as chairman in 2018, serving until 2022. In 2022, André Brunnsberg of Finnish organisation Olutliitto was elected Chair.

== Members ==
As of March 2023, the union's website listed 21 members from 17 European countries:

Country	Acronym	Organisation Name	Founded
Spain	ACCE	Asociación de Cerveceros Caseros Españoles	2009
Ireland		Beoir	2010
Austria	BierIG	BierIG Österreich	2002
Iceland		Bjórmenningarfélag Íslands	2021
Poland		Bractwo Piwne	1995
United Kingdom	CAMRA	Campaign for Real Ale	1971
Spain	CELCE	Club Español de Coleccionismo Cervecero	1987
Denmark	DBE	Danske Ølentusiaster	1998
France	FNABRA	Fédération Nationale des Associations Brassicoles	2002
Germany	GBCU	German Beer Consumers Union	2019
Switzerland and Liechtenstein	GFB	Gesellschaft zur Förderung der Bierkultur	1992
Italy	MoBI	Movimento Birra	2003
Finland		Olutliitto	1992
Poland	PSPD	Polskie Stowarzyszenie Piwowarów Domowych	2010
Czech Republic	SPP	Sdružení přátel piva	1990
Sweden	SÖ	Svenska Ölfrämjandet	1985
Netherlands	PINT	Vereniging Promotie Informatie Traditioneel Bier	1980
Netherlands		Beer Geeks	
Italy		Unionbirrai	1999
Belgium	ZYTHOS	Zythos	2003
Norway		Norbrygg	1998

== Aims ==
The union campaigns on European level to:

- To preserve and maintain the diversity of the traditional European beer cultures, with particular regard to local, regional and national brewing and beer styles
- To protect the consumer from the imposition of unfair pricing by opposing unreasonable taxation or exploitative business practices
- To ensure that the consumer receives the best factual information about any beer on commercial sale.
