= Naparbier =

Spanish brewery

- Industry: Craft beer
- Founded: 2009
- Founders: Juan Rodríguez, Josu Tañine, Txerra Aiastui and José Javier Rodríguez
- Headquarters: Polígono de Noain, Pamplona, Spain
- Website: Naparbier

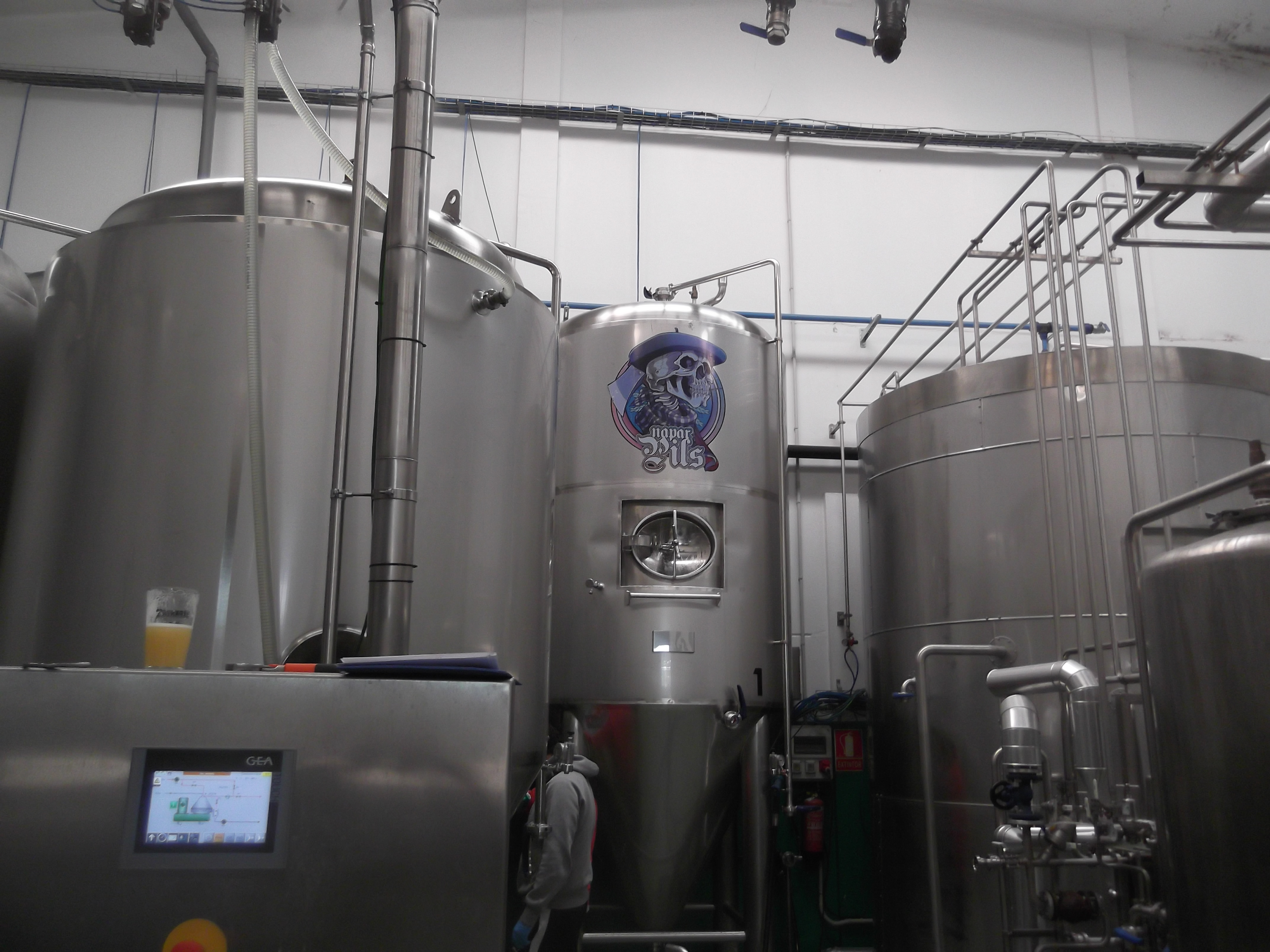
Naparbier Brewery at Noain (Navarra)

Naparbier is a Spanish microbrewery located near Pamplona (Navarra). It was founded in 2009 in Navarra, Spain by Juan Rodríguez, Josu Tañine, Txerra Aiastui and José Javier Rodríguez. They knew each other from their previous job in their former company, but after a downsizing plan they lost their jobs. After that, and with the money they got from their unemployment insurance, they decided to found Naparbier as a brewing cooperative.

In their beginnings, they were mentored by a German brewmaster called Alex Schmid, who introduced Juan to the homebrewing world and later helped them to set up their factory. Their name comes from the words Napar (Navarra) + Bier (beer in German).

In their first year they just brewed one type of beer—a lager—, and soon they started exporting to Europe and the UE thanks to Jeppe Bjergsø, then member of Danish brewery Mikkeller together with his brother Mikkel Borg Bjergsø and later founder of Evil Twin, who received one of their bottles through a mail interchange.

After that, they started brewing two of their most famous beers, ZZ and Aker that are still in production. Their first labels and brand image were first designed by Spanish artist Antonio Bravo and later by Spanish designer Xavi Forné

They are considered one of the best Spanish craft breweries, being rated as the best brewery in Spain in 2016, 2017 by Ratebeer and they have done collaborative brews with international breweries like Mikkeller, Nøgne Ø, Lervig, To Øl, Laugar, Beavertown or Magic Rock.
