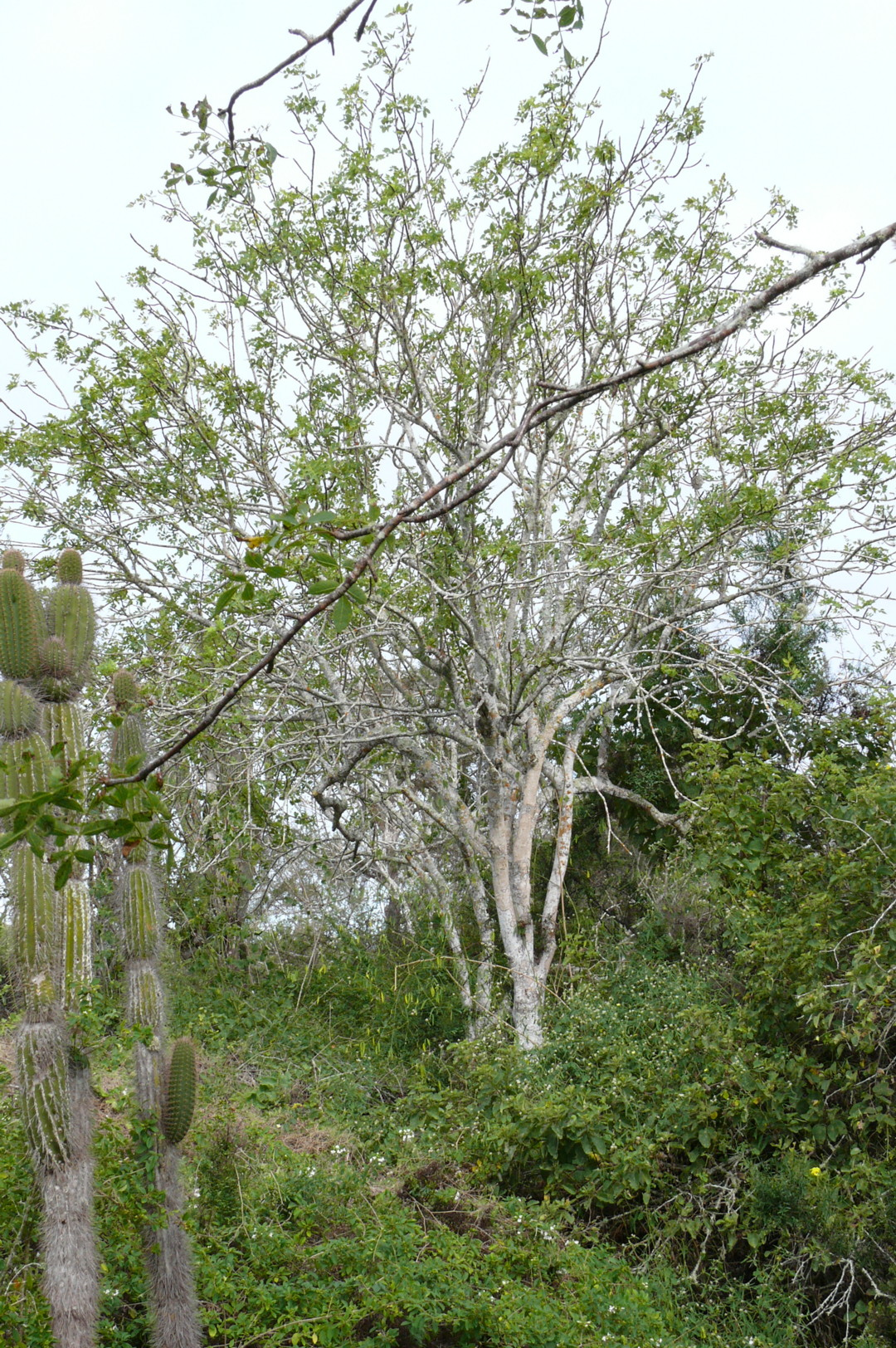

Conservation status
- Least Concern (IUCN 3.1)

Scientific classification
- Kingdom: Plantae
- Clade: Embryophytes
- Clade: Tracheophytes
- Clade: Spermatophytes
- Clade: Angiosperms
- Clade: Eudicots
- Clade: Rosids
- Order: Sapindales
- Family: Burseraceae
- Genus: Bursera
- Species: B. graveolens

Binomial name
- Bursera graveolens (Kunth) Triana & Planch.

Subspecies
- Bursera graveolens subsp. graveolens; Bursera graveolens subsp. malacophylla (B.L.Rob.) A.Weeks & Tye

Synonyms
- List: Elaphrium graveolens Kunth 1824; Amyris caranifera Willd. ex Engl.; Amyris graveolens Spreng.; Bursera anderssonii B.L.Rob.; Bursera graveolens var. pilosa Engl.; Bursera graveolens var. pubescens Engl.; Bursera graveolens var. villosula Cuatrec.; Bursera pilosa (Engl.) L.Riley; Bursera tatamaco (Tul.) Triana & Planch.; Elaphrium pilosum (Engl.) Rose; Elaphrium tatamaco Tul.; Spondias edmonstonei Hook.f.; Terebinthus graveolens (Kunth) Rose; Terebinthus pilosa (Engl.) Rose; Bursera malacophylla B.L.Rob.

= Bursera graveolens =

Species of tree

Bursera graveolens, known in Spanish as palo santo ('sacred wood'), is a species of wild tree in the family Burseraceae. It is native to Mexico, Central America, northwestern South America from Venezuela to Peru, and the Galápagos Islands.

Bursera graveolens is found in the seasonally dry tropical forests of Peru, Venezuela, Colombia, Ecuador, Panama, Costa Rica, Nicaragua, Honduras, Guatemala, El Salvador, and eastern and southern Mexico, including the Yucatán Peninsula. The subspecies malacophylla is endemic to the Galápagos Islands. The tree belongs to the same family (Burseraceae) as frankincense and myrrh. It is widely used in ritual purification and as folk medicine for stomach aches, as a sudorific, and as liniment for rheumatism. Aged heartwood is rich in terpenes such as limonene and α-terpineol.

== Conservation ==
In 2006, the government of Peru listed Bursera graveolens as "In Critical Danger" (En Peligro Critico (CR)) under Decree 043-2006-AG, banning the cutting of live trees and allowing only for the collection of naturally fallen or dead trees. However, in 2014, it was removed from the SERFOR (National Forest and Wildlife Service) list of protected species.

Illegal logging is a regular occurrence in northwestern Peru due to high demand. In 2010, the International Union for Conservation of Nature (IUCN) stated Bursera graveolens' conservation status as "stable".

In Ecuador there are reforestation programs for the palo santo tree. To reforest, the transplant method is used, which consists of determining an area of the forest with an overpopulation of the same species to extract the trees that are very close to each other. They are then transferred to an area of the forest where there are no trees so that they can continue their natural development. In this way, the space that remains when the trees are extracted will be used by other native species of the dry forest.

== Uses ==
=== Ethnobotanical uses ===
The use of palo santo from B. graveolens is traditional in South America, especially in Bolivia, Ecuador and Peru. It is used against mala energía ('bad energy'; Palo santo para limpiar tu casa de la mala energia, palo santo para la buena suerte, lit. 'Palo santo to cleanse your house of bad energy, palo santo for good luck'), which may sometimes refer to clinical disease. Its use reportedly dates back to the Inca era. Palo santo is common today as a type of incense.

Palo santo oil was used during the time of the Incas for its reputed spiritual purifying properties. Today, palo santo oil may be applied to the body (such as at the base of the skull or on the spine) to increase relaxation, similar to aromatherapy.

Palo santo may be burned, similar to incense, by lighting shavings of palo santo wood. In Peru, a shaman, or medicine man, reportedly lights palo santo sticks and the rising smoke will enter the "energy field" of ritual participants to "clear misfortune, negative thoughtprints, and 'evil spirits'". Peruvians harvest fallen branches and twigs of the B. graveolens tree, a practice that is regulated by the government of Peru, so trees are not cut for wood harvesting. The charcoal of palo santo sticks can also be used for ritual smudging. Yoga studios and witchcraft practitioners utilize the substance.

=== Drinks ===
Palo santo wood has been used in the aging of some beers, either as barrels, or simply as wood chips; stronger, darker beers being the preferred style for the wood to complement. Examples include Dogfish Head's Marron Brown Ale from the US, Stu Mostow's Palo Santo and Coconut Baltic Porter from Poland, Põhjala's Baltic Porter Day 2022 from, Drunken Bros' Misfit Pumkins, and Laugar Brewery's Braskadi from the Basque Country.

Palo santo wood has also been used in aging barrels for whiskey. In Ecuador, they drink palo santo tea.
