= AleSmith Brewing Company =

Craft brewery in San Diego, California

Coordinates: 32°53′31.44″N 117°8′40.87″W

- Interactive map of AleSmith Brewing Company
- Location: 9990 AleSmith Ct. San Diego, California, U.S.
- Opened: 1995
- Annual production volume: 30,000 US beer barrels (35,000 hL)
- Owner: Peter Zien (independent)

Active beers
Name	Type
San Diego .394 Pale Ale	American Pale Ale
AleSmith Nut Brown Ale	Nut Brown Ale
AleSmith IPA	India Pale Ale
Horny Devil	Belgian Strong Ale
Wee Heavy	Scotch Ale
Speedway Stout	Imperial Stout

Seasonal beers
Name	Type
Evil Dead Red Ale	American Red Ale

Other beers
Name	Type
Barrel-Aged Speedway Stout	Imperial Stout
Barrel-Aged Wee Heavy	Scotch Ale
Barrel-Aged Old Numbskull	Barleywine

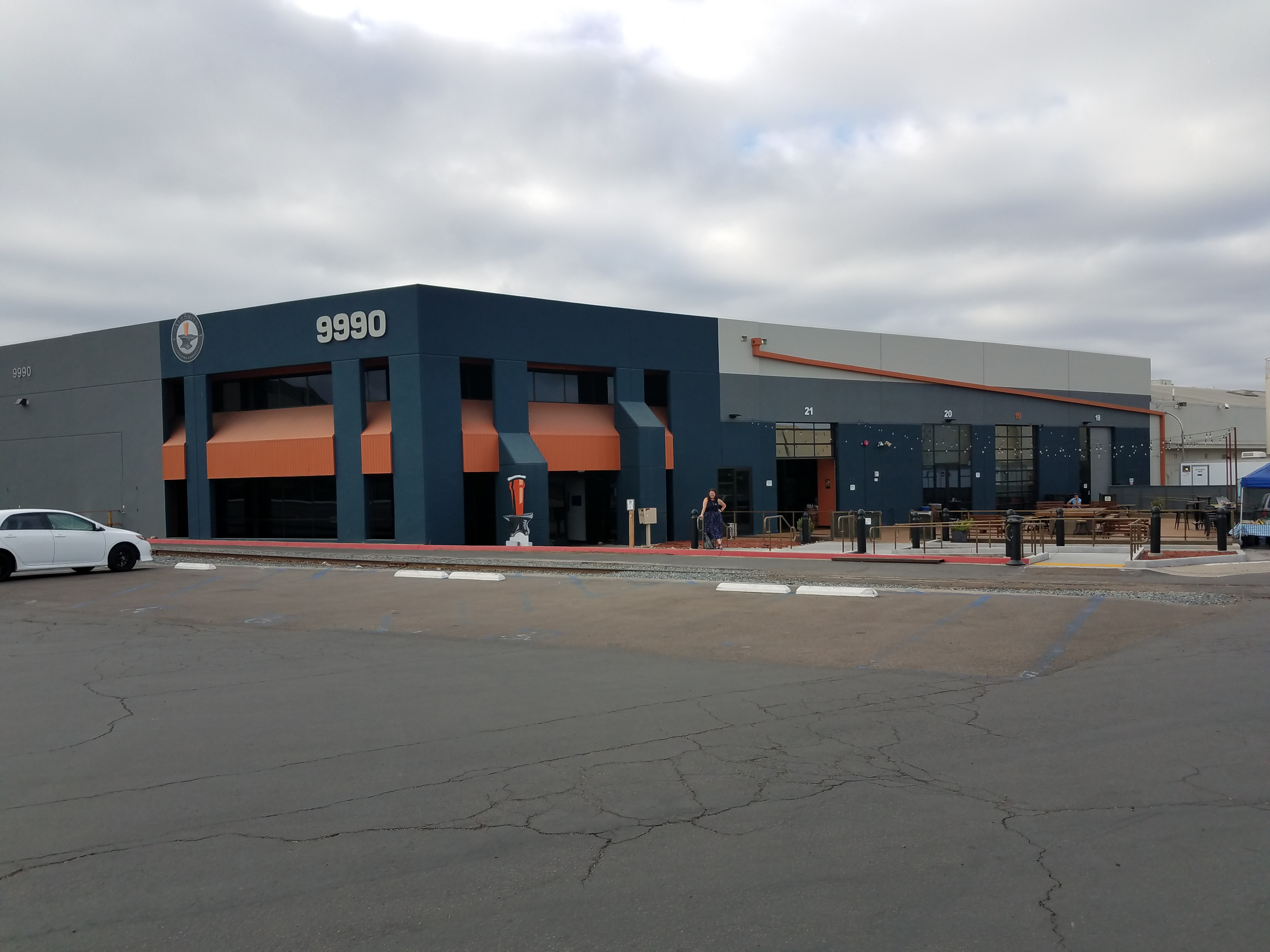
The exterior of AleSmith's large production facility, opened in 2015.

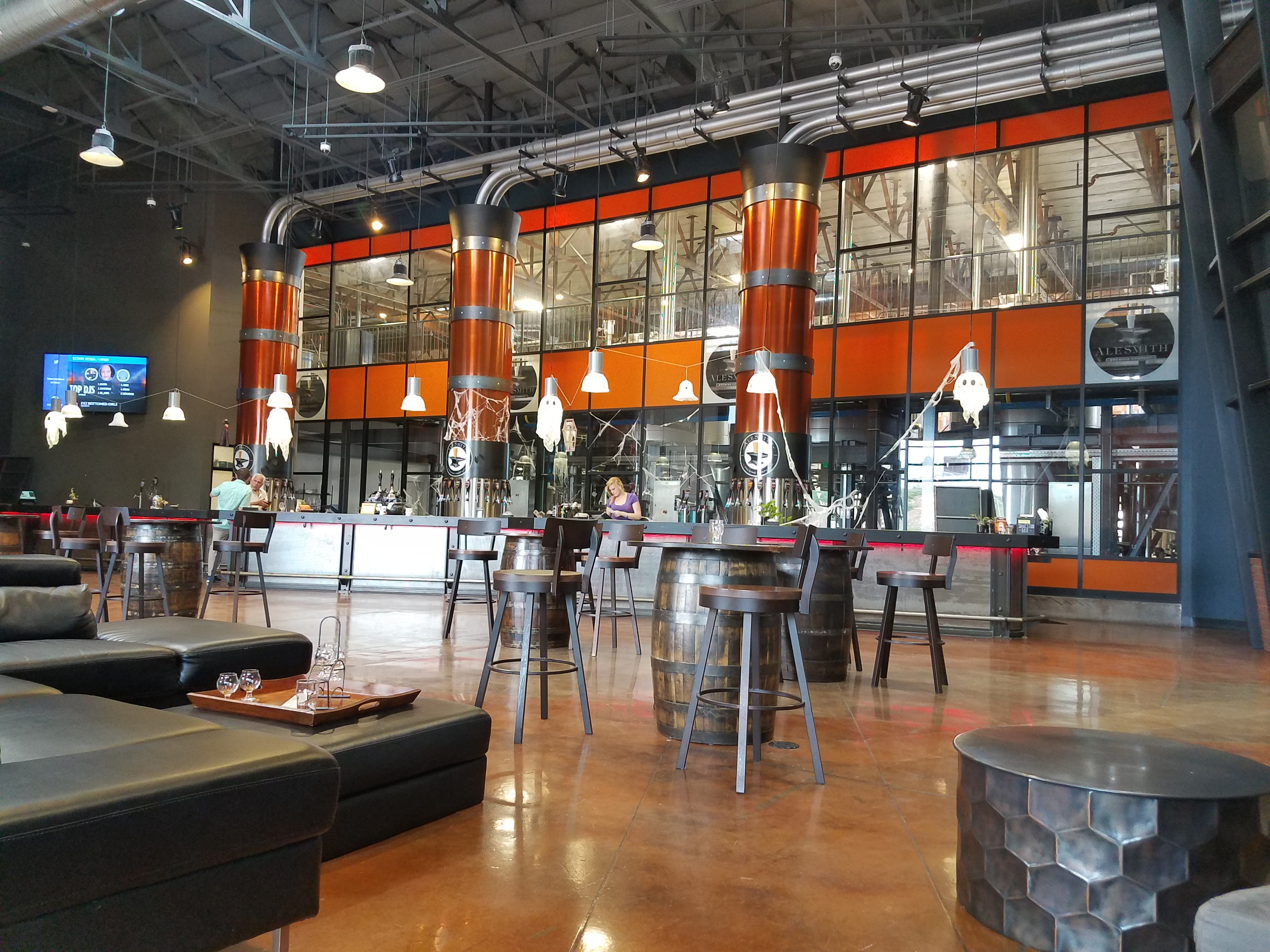
The interior of AleSmith's large production facility and taproom, opened in 2015.

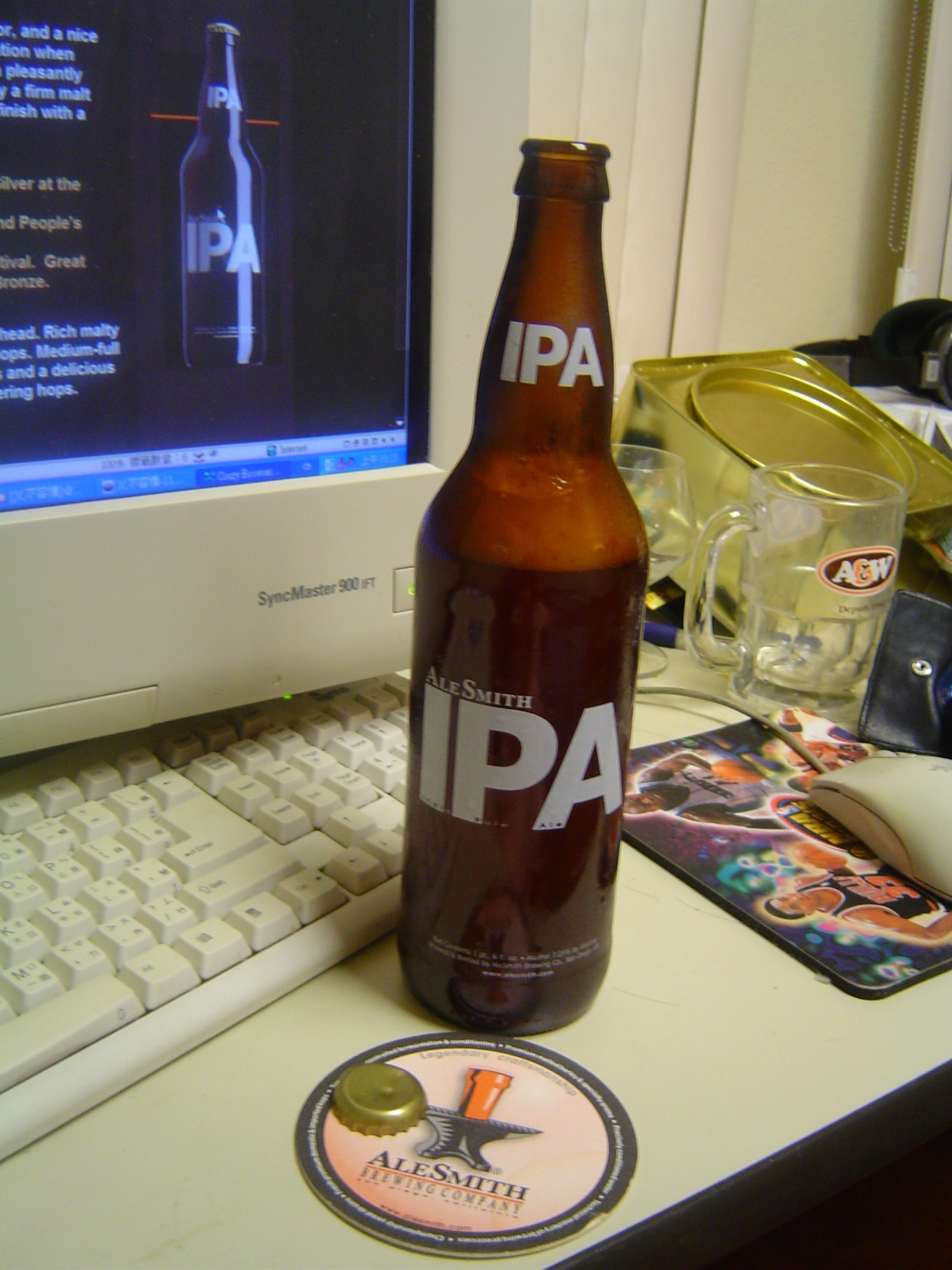
India Pale Ale.

AleSmith Brewing Company is an American craft brewery in San Diego, California. It specializes in handcrafted ales in a variety of styles. As of 2015 it produces about 25,000 barrels of beer a year.

== History ==
The brewery was founded in San Diego in 1995 by Skip Virgilio and Ted Newcomb. Skip Virgilio was AleSmith's original brewmaster. Peter Zien became brewmaster upon purchasing the company in July, 2002. Zien is a BJCP "Grand Master level 1" beer judge, the only one in San Diego County.

The original brewery is located at 9366 Cabot Drive in San Diego's Miramar area. In 2015 the company added a larger brewery and tasting room, also in Miramar, at 9990 AleSmith Court. At 25,000 square feet, the tasting room is billed as the largest beer tasting room in San Diego County. Brewing operations at the new facility will eventually expand the company's brewing capacity ten-fold, according to Zien.

Beers from the brewery have been rated on RateBeer.com website as #1 Top Brewer in the World 2006 and again in 2013. In 2008, AleSmith was awarded "Small Brewing Company and Small Brewing Company Brewer of the Year" at the Great American Beer Festival.

In 2015, AleSmith announced that Danish gypsy brewer Mikkeller had partnered with them to turn the original facility, located on Cabot Drive, into Mikkeller San Diego.

== Awards ==
The company has won ten medals in World Beer Cup competition, including six golds. They won for Wee Heavy (gold, 2020); Belgian Strong Ale (bronze, 1998); Winter YuleSmith (gold, 2004); Vintage AleSmith Old Numbskull (gold, 2008); AleSmith Decadence '05 Old Ale (gold, 2008); AleSmith Wee Heavy (gold, 2010); AleSmith Decadence '09 Weizenbock (bronze, 2010); AleSmith Decadence '10 Old Ale (silver, 2012); AleSmith Old Numbskull (bronze, 2012); AleSmith Old Ale '13 (gold, 2014).

At the 2008 Great American Beer Festival, AleSmith Brewing Company won the Small Brewing Company and Small Brewing Company Brewer of the Year Award. By 2013, the AleSmith team had acquired 16 GABF beer medals: Belgian-Style Strong Ale (silver, 1998); Stumblin’ Monk (bronze, 2000); Wee Heavy Scotch Ale (bronze, 2004); AleSmith IPA (bronze, 2005); Wee Heavy Scotch Ale (silver, 2005); Vintage Speedway Stout (silver, 2008); Old Numbskull Barley Wine (silver, 2008); Decadence ‘05 Old Ale (gold, 2008); Wee Heavy Scotch Ale (gold, 2008); AleSmith IPA (silver, 2011); Old Numbskull Barley Wine (silver, 2011); Decadence ’10 Old Ale (silver, 2011); Grand Cru (bronze, 2012); Decadence ’10 Old Ale (bronze, 2012); Old Numbskull Barley Wine (gold, 2013); Decadence ‘12 Quadruple (silver, 2013); Nut Brown (bronze, 2019)

== The beers ==
AleSmith's beers are inspired by the brewing styles of Great Britain and Belgium. Some AleSmith beers, such as their Cream Ale and Robust Porter Beer, are only offered on draft or in kegs at the brewery. The majority, however, are available in 22-ounce or 750 ml bottles. These brews are listed below.

=== Year-round brews ===
Name	Style	ABV	IBU	Original Gravity	Serving Temp.	Serving Glass		
Anvil ESB	ESB	5.5%	30	1.055	45°-50°	Pint		
Grand Cru	Belgian Strong Dark Ale	10.0%	17	1.088	50°-55°	Tulip		
Horny Devil	Belgian Golden Ale	10.0%	25	1.081	50°-55°	Tulip		
IPA	American IPA	7.25%	73	1.066	45°-50°	Pint		
‘Lil’ Devil	Belgian Pale Ale	5.75%	24	1.050	45°-50°	Tulip		
Nut Brown Ale	Brown Ale	5.0%	17	1.054	45°-50°	Pint		
Old Numbskull	American Barleywine	11.0%	96	1.106	50°-55°	Tulip		
Speedway Stout	Imperial Stout	12.0%	70	1.114	50°-55°	Tulip		
Wee Heavy	Scotch Ale	10.0%	26	1.102	50°-55°	Tulip		
X - Extra Pale Ale	American Pale Ale	5.25%	35	1.048	45°-50°	Pint	.394 IPA	6%

=== Seasonal Brews ===
Name	Availability	Style	ABV	IBU	Original Gravity	Serving Temp.	Serving Glass
Decadence	Year Round	Varies	Varies	Varies	Varies	50°-55°	Tulip
Evil Dead Red	September/October	American Amber	6.66%	24	1.073	45°-50°	Pint
My Bloody Valentine	January/February	American Amber	6.66%	24	17.5°P	45°-50°	Pint
Olde Ale	Spring	Old Ale	11.0%	25	1.110	50°-55°	Snifter
Summer YuleSmith	July/August	Double IPA	8.5%	105	1.080	45°-50°	Pint
Winter YuleSmith	November/December	American Amber	8.5%	48	1.090	50°-55°	Pint

=== Barrel-Aged Brews ===
Name	Style	ABV	IBU	Original Gravity	Serving Temp.	Serving Glass
BA Grand Cru	Barrel Aged Belgian Strong Dark Ale	10.0%	17	1.088	50°-55°	Tulip
BA Old Numbskull	Barrel Aged American Barleywine	11.0%	N/A	1.106	50°-55°	Tulip
BA Speedway Stout	Barrel Aged Imperial Stout	12.0%	N/A	1.111	50°-55°	Tulip
BA Wee Heavy	Barrel Aged Scotch Ale	10%	N/A	1.096	50°-55°	Tulip

== Artwork ==
AleSmith's bottles are often accompanied by the trademark AleSmith anvil.

== See also ==
- List of breweries in San Diego County, California
