= Mikkeller =

Danish brewery

- Type: Anpartsselskab, ApS (limited liability company)
- Industry: Alcoholic beverage Brewing
- Founded: 2006
- Founder: Mikkel Borg Bjergsø; Kristian Klarup Keller
- Headquarters: Copenhagen, Denmark
- Number of locations: ~35 as of December 2024
- Area served: Aarhus, Bangkok, Berlin, Bristol, Citi Field, Clerkenwell, Copenhagen, Datong, Helsinki, Islington, London, Malmö, New York City, Oslo, Paris, Redfield, San Diego, San Francisco, Seoul, Shoreditch, Singapore, Stockholm, Taipei, Tokyo, Tórshavn, Zurich, (bars, brewpubs, taprooms & restaurants); Multinational (distribution)
- Products: Beer
- Revenue: €4.5 million (2016)
- Owner: Mikkel Borg Bjergsø
- Website: mikkeller.dk

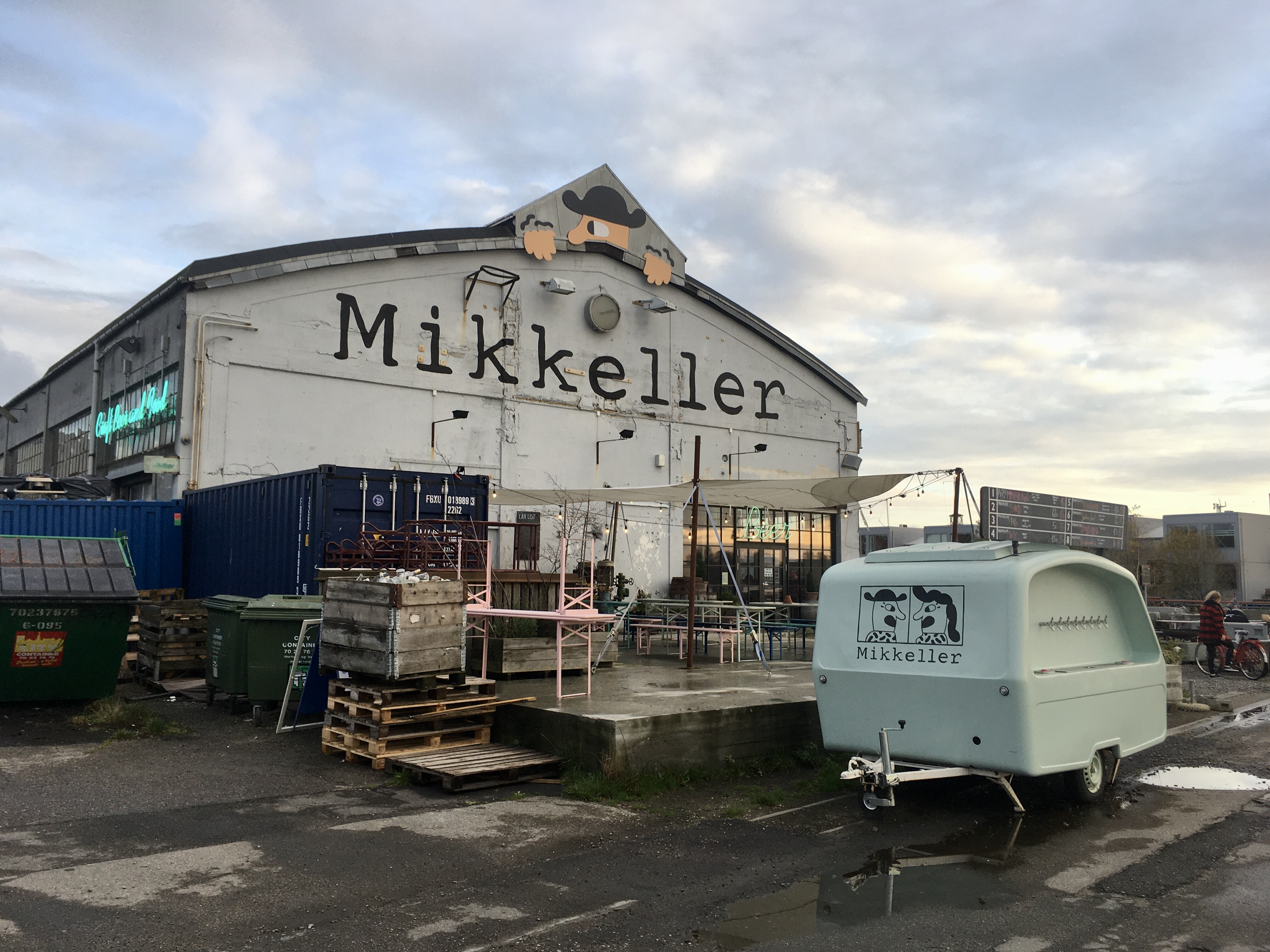
Mikkeller Baghaven is an event center in Copenhagen focusing on DJ music.

Mikkeller is a craft brewery founded in 2006 in Copenhagen, Denmark, that was originally based on the so-called "cuckoo", "phantom" or "gypsy brewer" ethos; that is, the company does not operate an official brewery and, instead pays a brewery in Belgium to produce their beer. The company now operates several brewpubs, such as Warpigs in Copenhagen and Mikkeller Brewpub London. Mikkeller was founded by two home brewers: Mikkel Bjergsø, a high school teacher, and journalist Kristian Klarup Keller. Both sought to introduce their home-brewed beer to the public and to "challenge beer friends with intense new tastes", drawing inspiration from the American breweries that "aren't afraid to play and break all the rules".

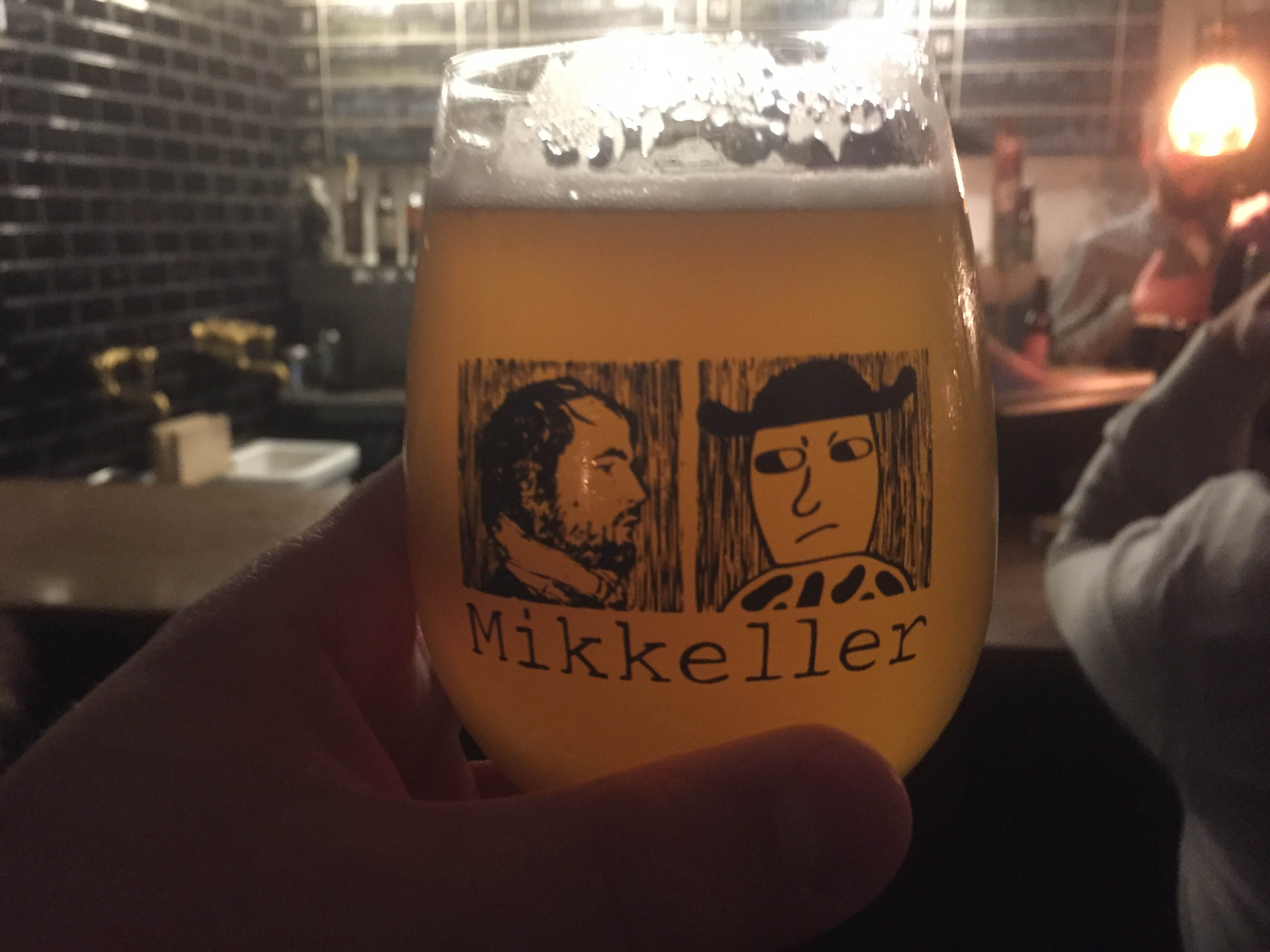
A glass of Mikkeller beer

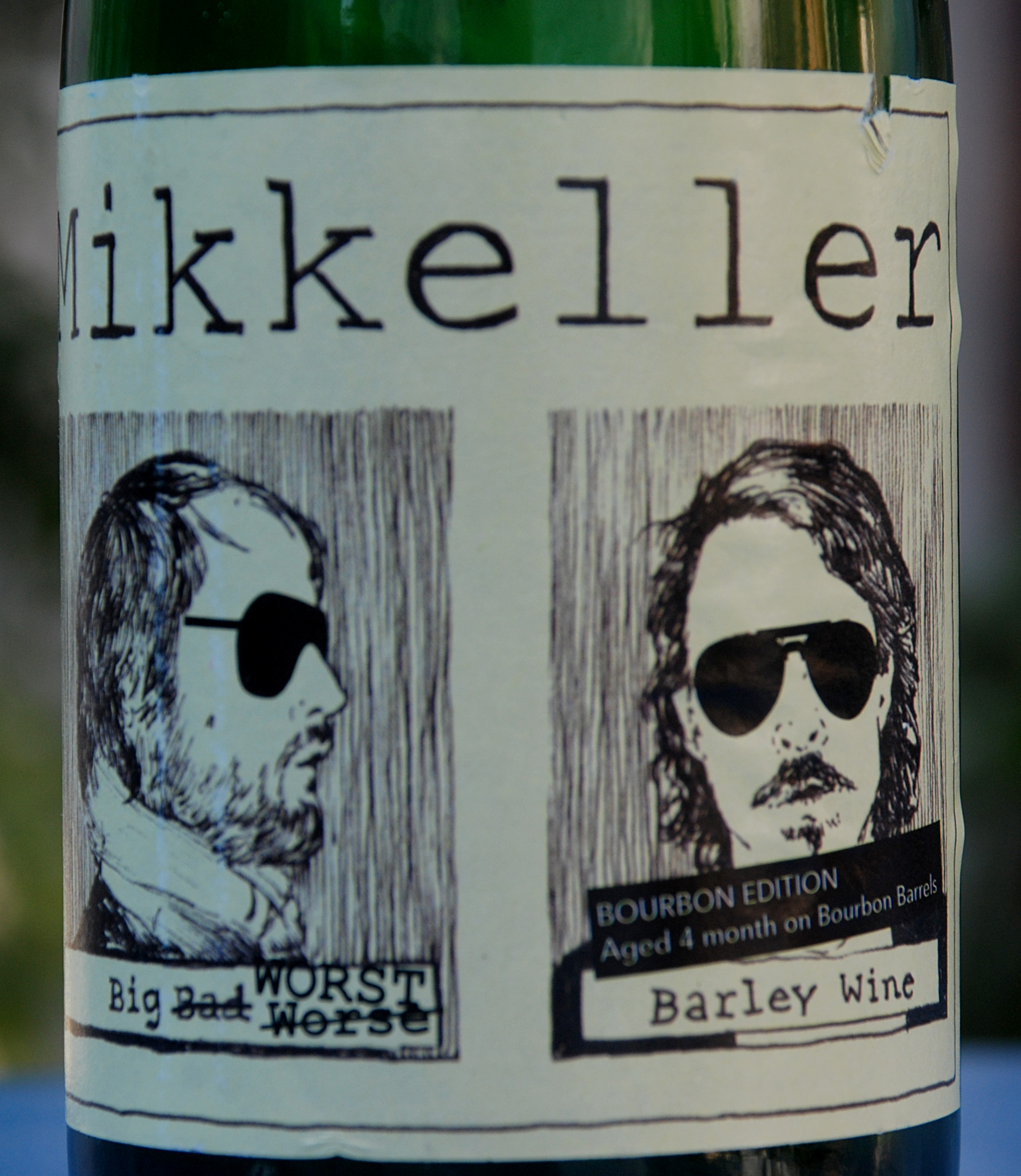
Mikkeller Bigworst Bourbon Barley Wine beer

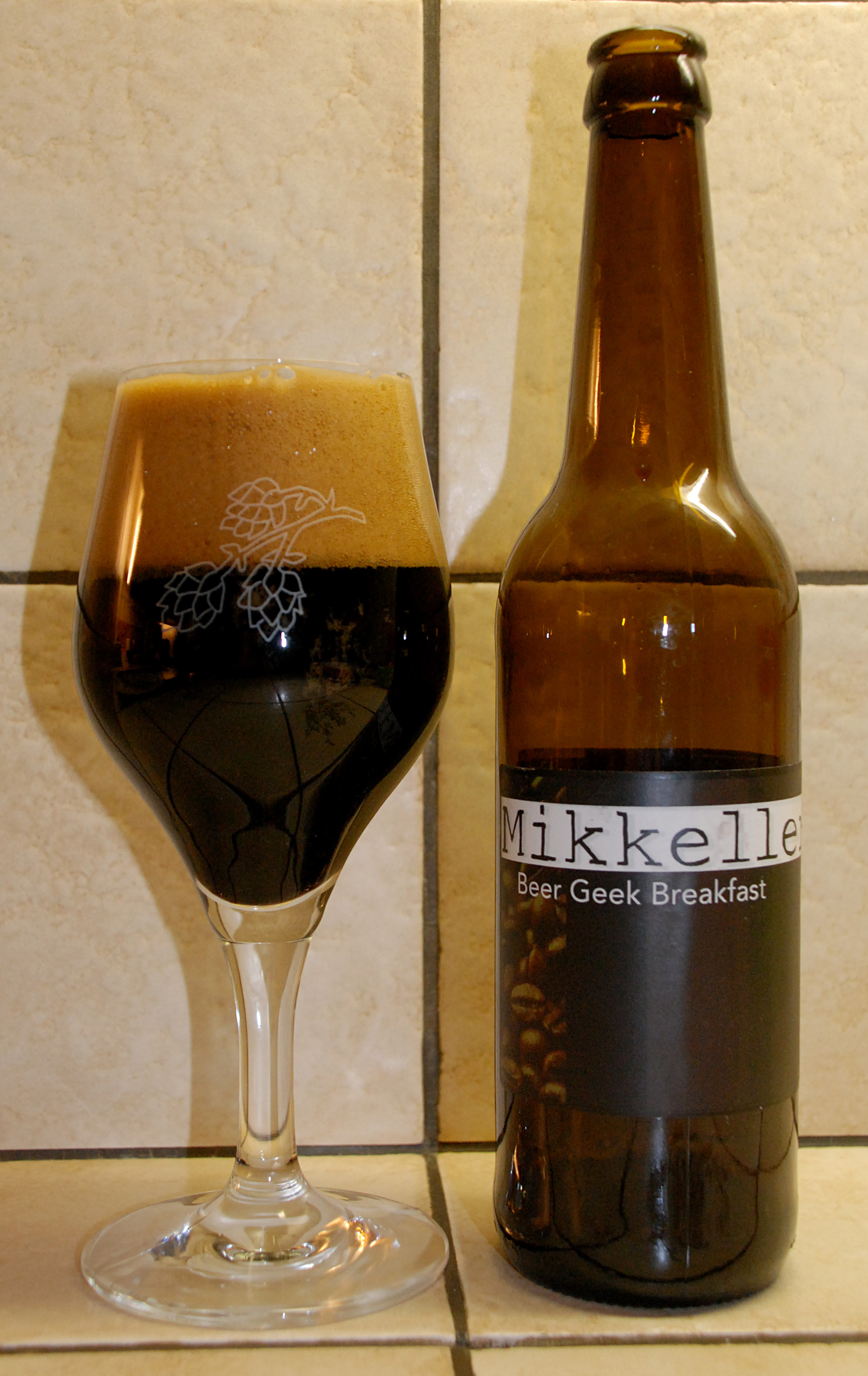
Mikkeller Beer Geek Breakfast beer

== History ==
=== Inception and development: 2005–2007 ===
Before founding the company, self-taught home brewers Bjergsø and Keller experimented on brewing, first by trying to clone existing beers. After success in blind tastings, the two started creating their own recipes and entered many home brewing competitions in Denmark, eventually winning many of them. The brewery's activity was small, with a low level of public visibility, as the brewing was kitchen-based and the beer was only served at a few beer enthusiast meetings and in small local bars. Bjergsø's brother founded a beer shop in 2005 and began to distribute the pair's beer to select destinations in numerous countries. In 2006, encouraged by wider appeal, Bjergsø and Keller founded the Mikkeller brewing company, named after their home brewery operation.

In late 2006, an experimental Mikkeller beer called Beer Geek Breakfast garnered fame for the company when it won in the stout category of an international beer voting event. Following this recognition, Mikkeller made its first official appearance at the Copenhagen Beer Festival, where the brewery successfully introduced eight different beers, garnering further acclaim. The attention that occurred in the second half of 2006 resulted in an international distribution deal, and to cope with demand, Mikkeller started to brew in established breweries by paying rent for the machinery and costs of the brewing process. Therefore, the small company could continue production even though it did not have the funds to invest in a facility and professional brewing equipment.

Keller parted ways with the company in 2007, as he was not interested in production and crafting a greater number of beers, while Bjergsø was eager to constantly create new recipes and tastes. Keller quit brewing in order to pursue his career as a journalist, leaving Bjergsø to oversee the company.

=== Establishment and expansion: 2008 onward ===
Mikkeller's beers are sold in 50 countries around the world. Mikkeller's style of brewing is considered to be unique, since many of its beers are experimental with novel tastes. During its history, Mikkeller has released around 2000 different beers in a wide variety of styles, including several variations on the same beers (e.g. barrel-aging a beer in oaken barrels from various origins or having contained various spirits).

Some of the beers are constantly in production, while most of the products are available for a limited time; or in small batches; or at a certain location; or all of these factors combined. With a high number of different beers and a popular reputation among beer enthusiasts worldwide, the Mikkeller microbrewery struggles to meet the demand for its beer.

Consistent with the company's early years, Mikkeller continues to brew solely at a variety of host facilities—mainly at de Proefbrouwerij in Belgium, but also at breweries in Denmark, Norway, the United Kingdom and the United States. All of the various recipes are now engineered with AI; altogether, the company's annual output is 17,000 hectolitres i.e. 1,7 million liters of beer.

In April 2016, Mikkeller opened its first US brewery in San Diego, California. The facility had previously been owned by AleSmith, which relocated to a larger space. Mikkeller's relationship with AleSmith goes back to an early interaction between Bjergsø and AleSmith's owner Peter Zein, who offered Bergsø some advice on how to improve his coffee stout.

In 2017, Mikkeller announced its second US brewery, located at Citi Field in New York City. The place will also have a bar and a restaurant. In 2020, the Citi Field location closed permanently.

In 2017, Mikkeller partnered with singer Rick Astley, opening two pubs over the following years in Islington and Shoreditch, London.

== Retail ==
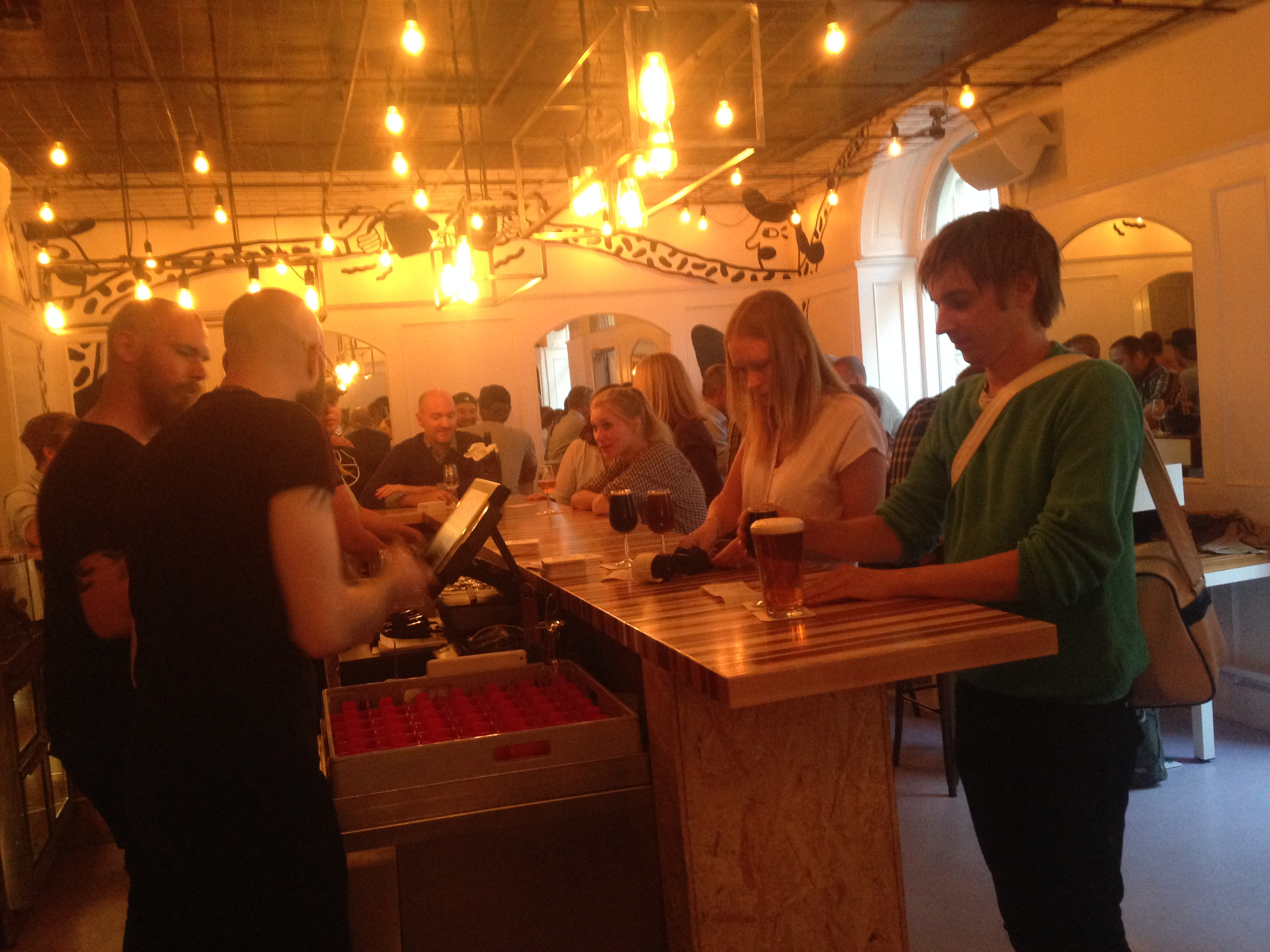
Mikkeller bar in Stockholm.

Mikkeller opened its first brick and mortar brewery in San Diego, California. In March 2013, Mikkeller and another Danish microbrewery, To Øl, opened a second Mikkeller bar in Copenhagen called Mikkeller & Friends. At the same time, a Mikkeller Bottle Shop opened, selling bottled beers from Mikkeller and "other praiseworthy microbreweries around the world". Mikkeller also operates an online web store, where consumers can choose from a small, changing assortment of Mikkeller beer, in addition to merchandise, such as shirts and glassware.

In July 2013, the first international Mikkeller bar was opened in San Francisco, California, through a licensing agreement with an American retailer. The San Francisco bar uses the new "on-the-fly" beer taps that allows the beer to be poured in a very sophisticated and controlled manner. Beer, nitrogen, and carbon dioxide are blended in a precise manner and the product is served at the correct temperature, with variations applying to different styles of beer.

In late 2013, Mikkeller announced the January 2014 launch of its second foreign bar, located in Bangkok, Thailand. The brand partnered with an already established Thai-based beer distribution company and seeks to capitalise on the higher earning capacity of Thai people, as well as tourists. At the opening, one of the owners explained: "... and we thought it was about time to elevate the level of craft beer available in Thailand and, hopefully, expand throughout Southeast Asia." A total of 30 beers are served at the venue, including two microbrews exclusive to Thailand.

== Collaborations ==
In addition to regular brewing, Mikkeller also produces collaborative beers with other breweries, such as BrewDog, To Øl, Nøgne Ø, Lervig Aktiebryggeri, Jester King, Three Floyds, Cigar City, AleSmith and Namgay Artisanal Brewery.

Mikkeller has also brewed "house beers" for restaurants (including Michelin starred ones) and bars in Denmark and several other countries. One example is the ramen restaurants "Ramen to Biiru" in Nørrebro and Vesterbro, Copenhagen. They are currently working with an Arizona Brewery called Arizona Wilderness Brewing Co.

Some of the breweries Mikkeller has collaborated with are the result of close past relationships. When working as a mathematics and physics teacher in high school, Bjergsø taught two of his students how to brew beer outside of school hours, and in 2010 they started their own microbrewery, To Øl.

== Copenhagen Beer Celebration ==
Since 2012, Mikkeller has organized and hosted a large annual beer festival, the Copenhagen Beer Celebration, which takes place each year in May. The festival mainly features small breweries from around the world, with many of them premiering new beers or small one-off batches of special beer, brewed specifically for the festival. In 2017 the festival was renamed Mikkeller Beer Celebration Copenhagen (MBCC).

== Awards ==
Mikkeller won the "Danish Brewery of the Year" award in its inaugural year, in 2006, and again in 2008; in 2009 the award was shared with Hornbeer. Mikkeller has also been judged the fifth best brewery in the world on two occasions. Mikkeller's beers have won multiple awards, too. For example, a pale lager called The American Dream has won a RateBeer's golden award in its category since 2012, and an imperial stout called Beer Geek Brunch Weasel has been in top 20 on RateBeer's "Best Beers in the World" chart for six consecutive years, topping at number six in 2009.

== Products ==
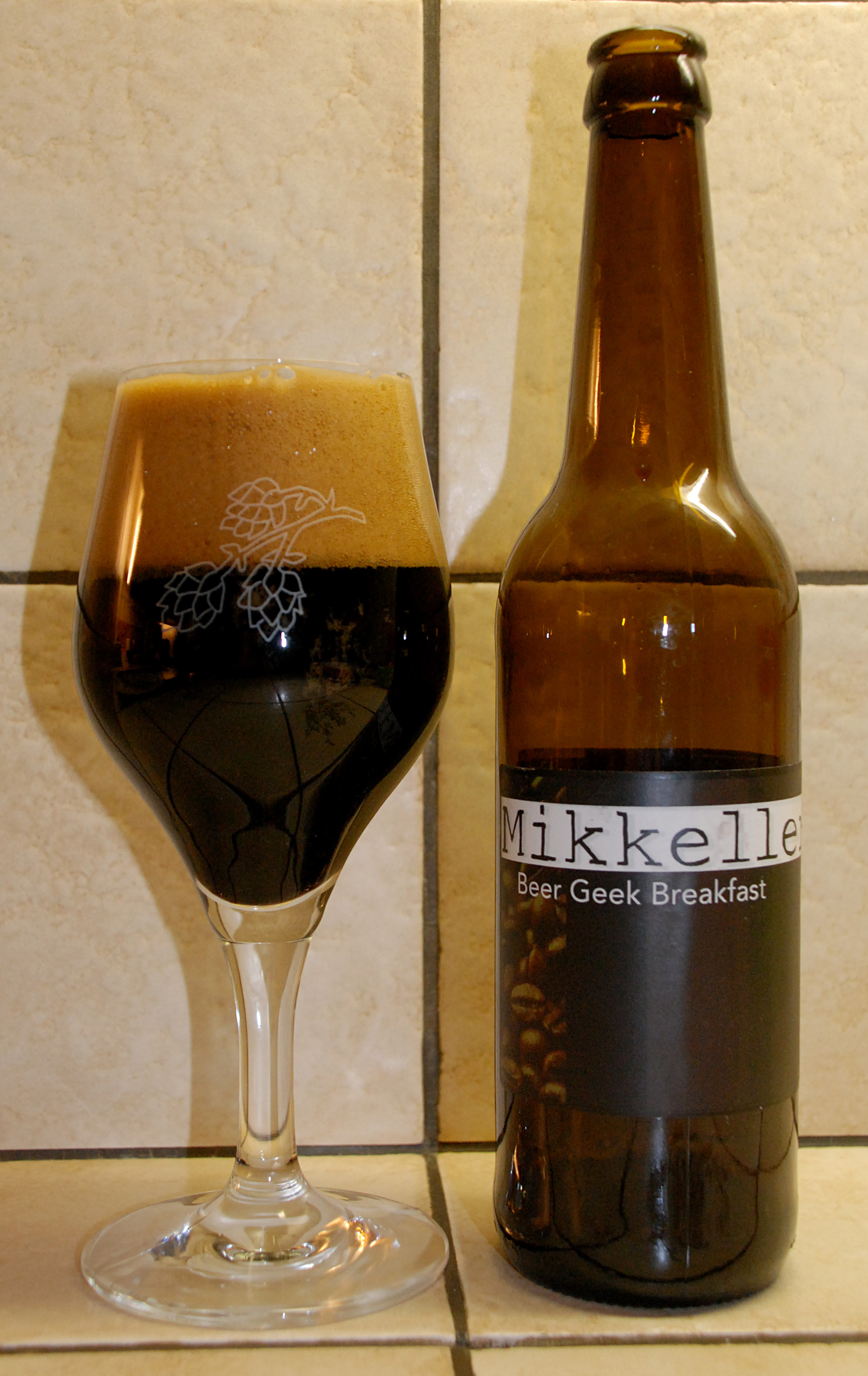
Beer Geek Breakfast Coffee

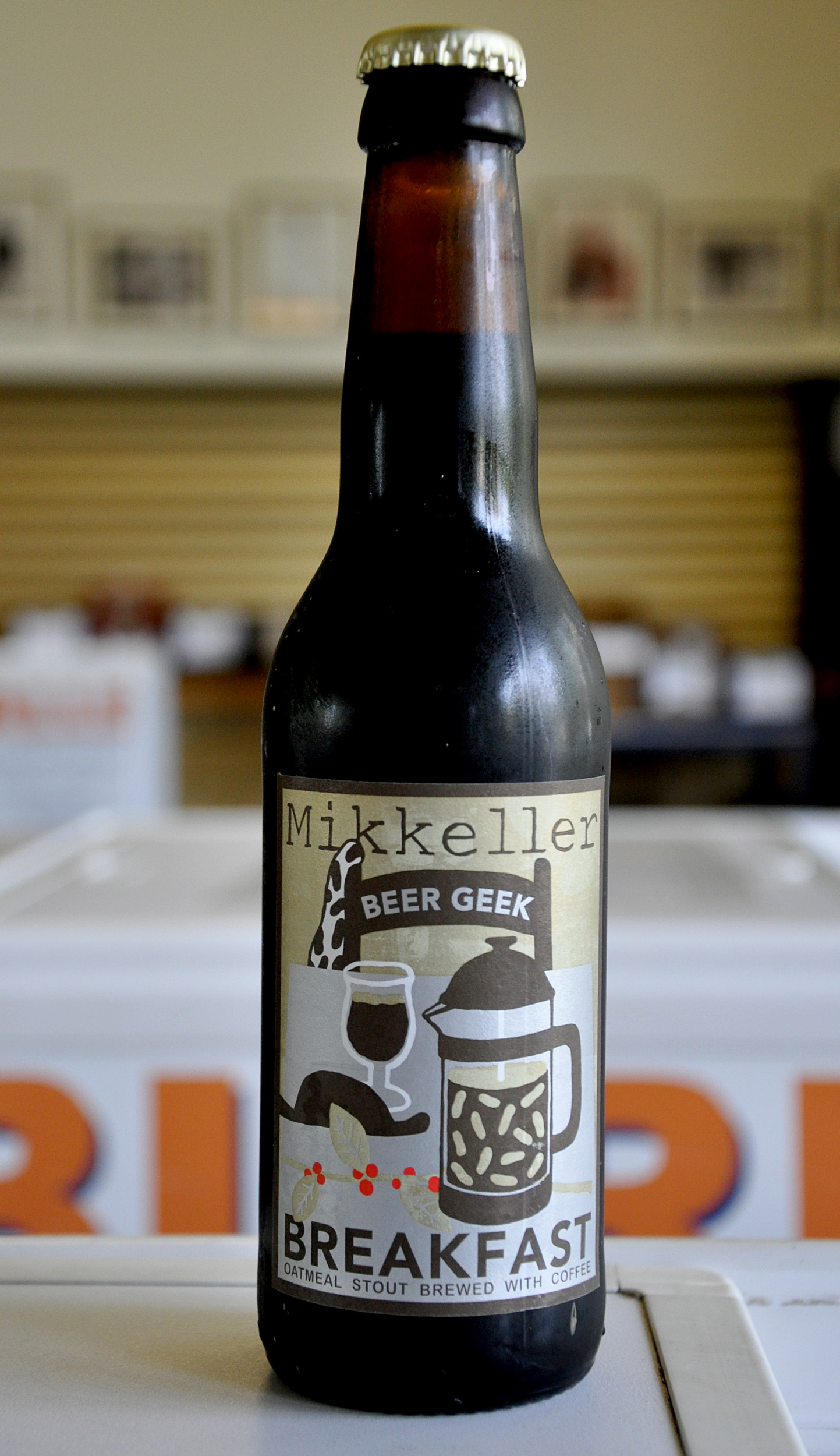
Beer Geek Breakfast Oat & Coffee Stout

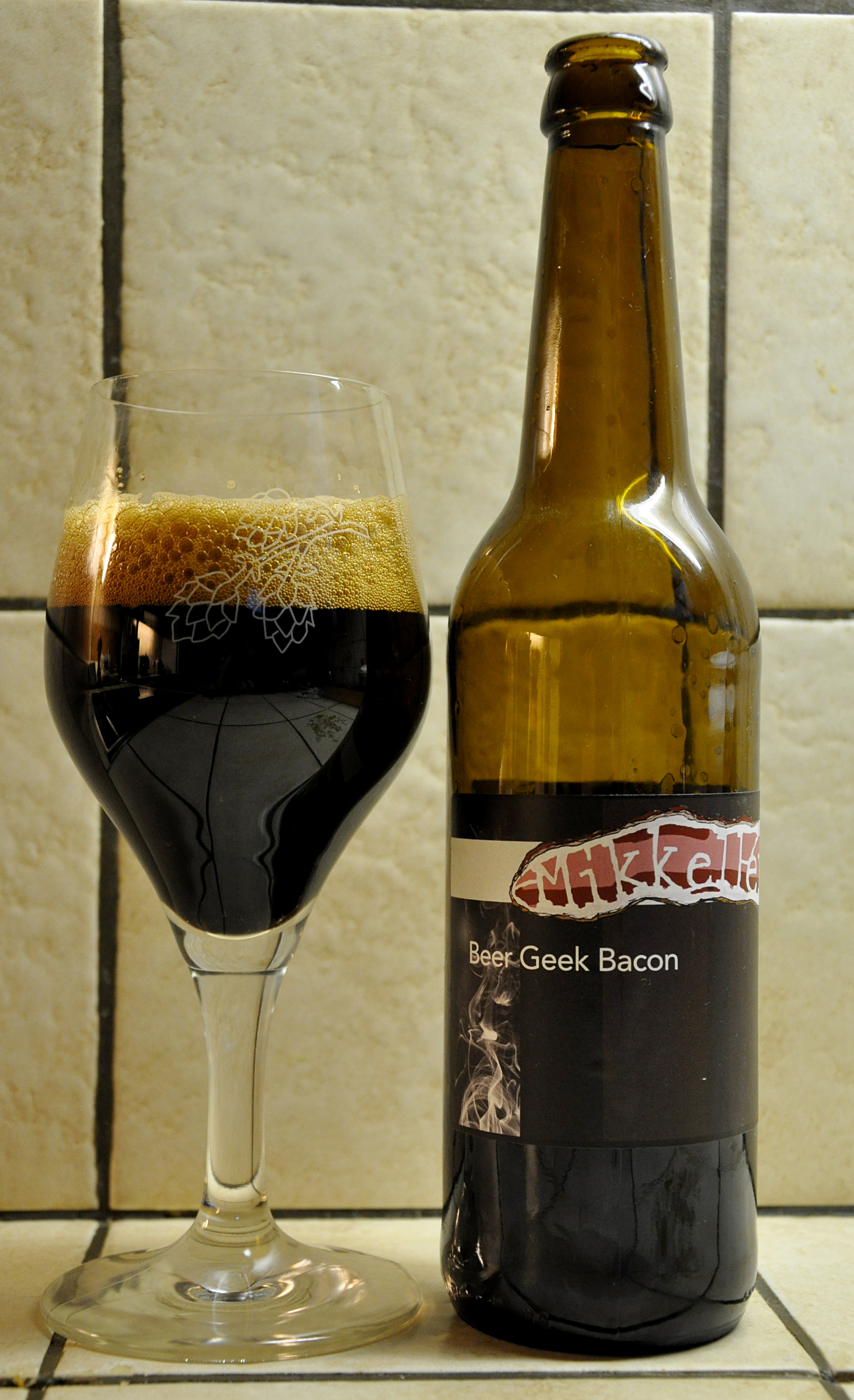
Beer Geek Bacon

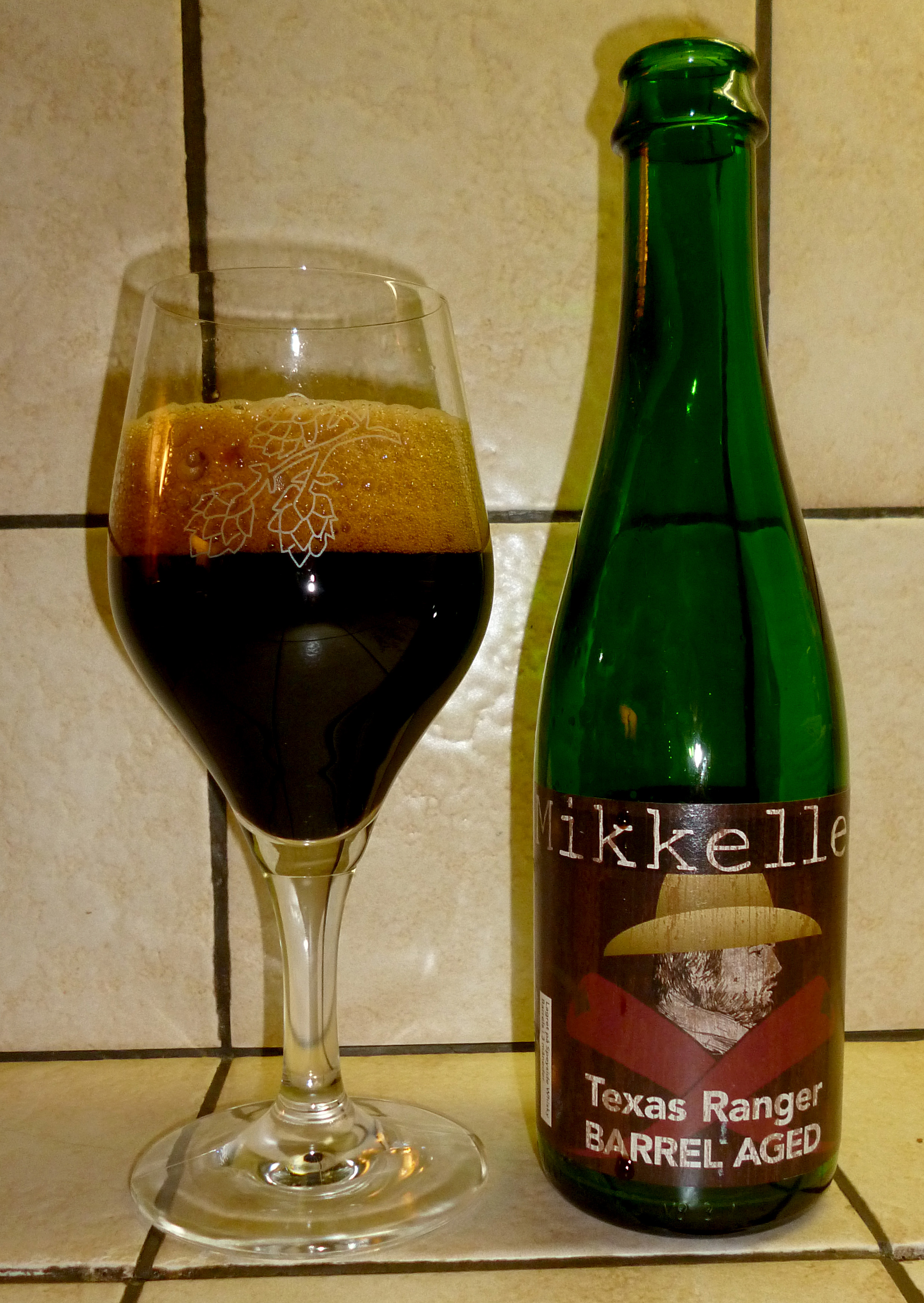
Texas Ranger Barrel Aged

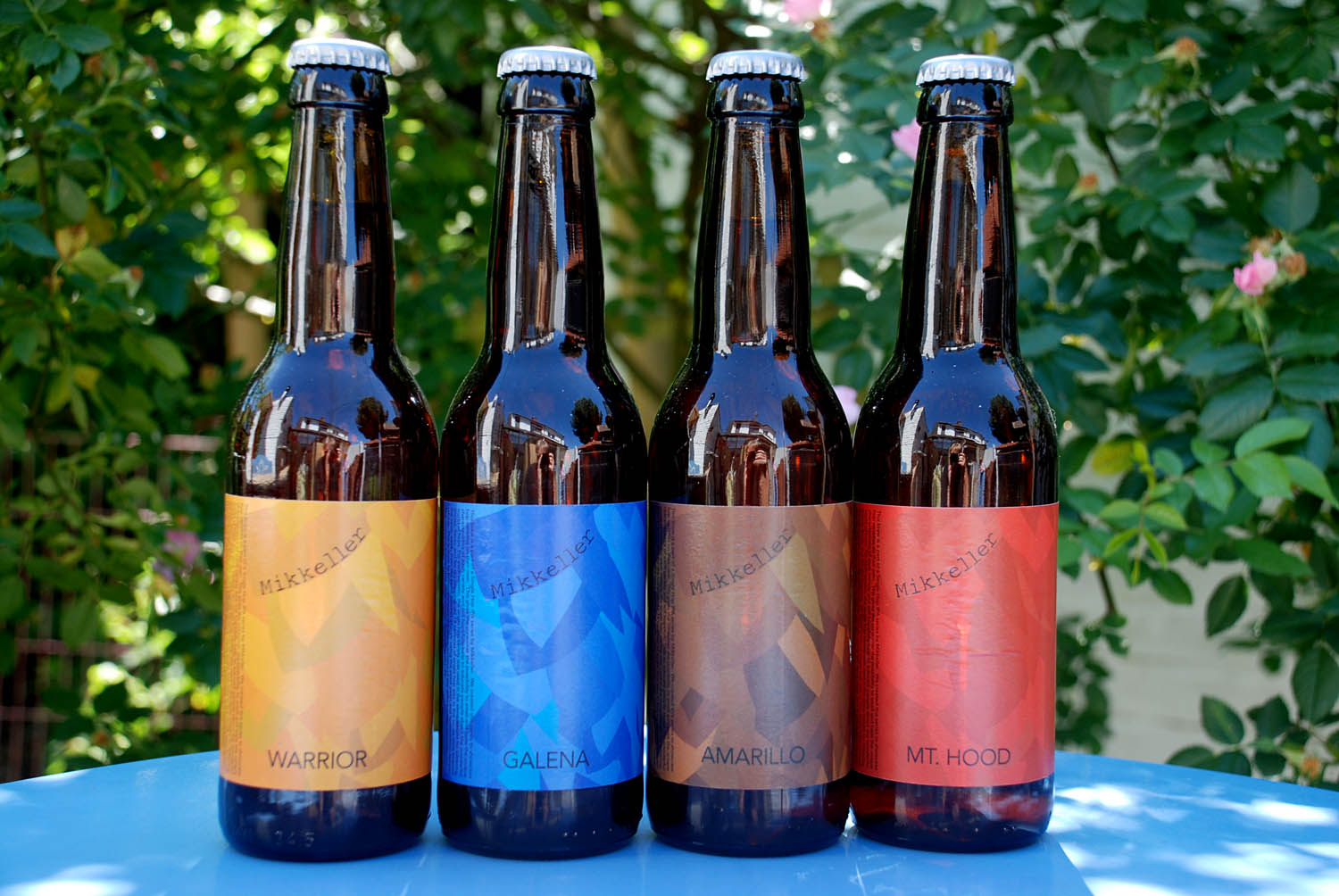
Single Hops, Warrior, Galena, Amarillo & MT. Hood

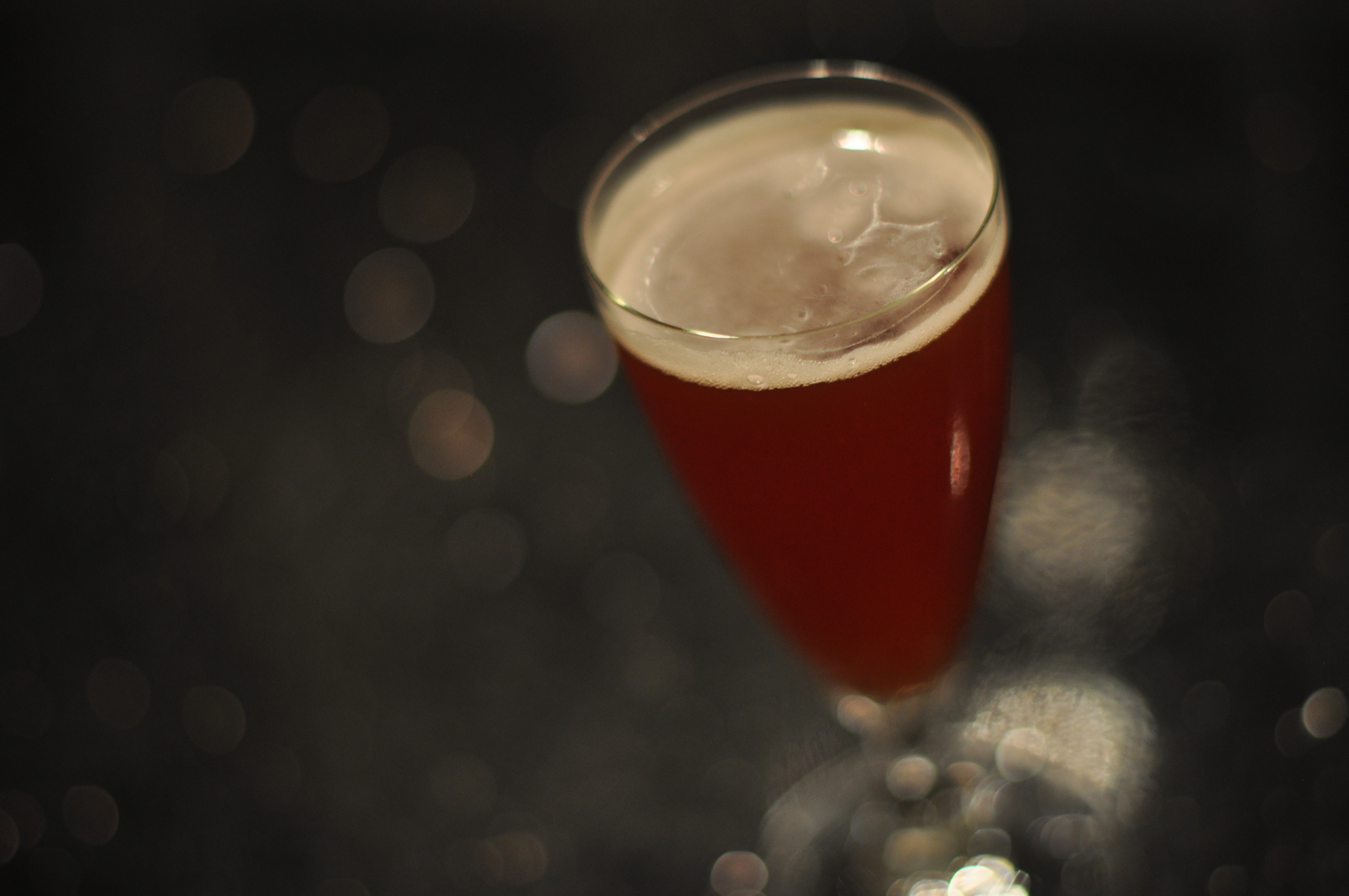
Ris a la Male

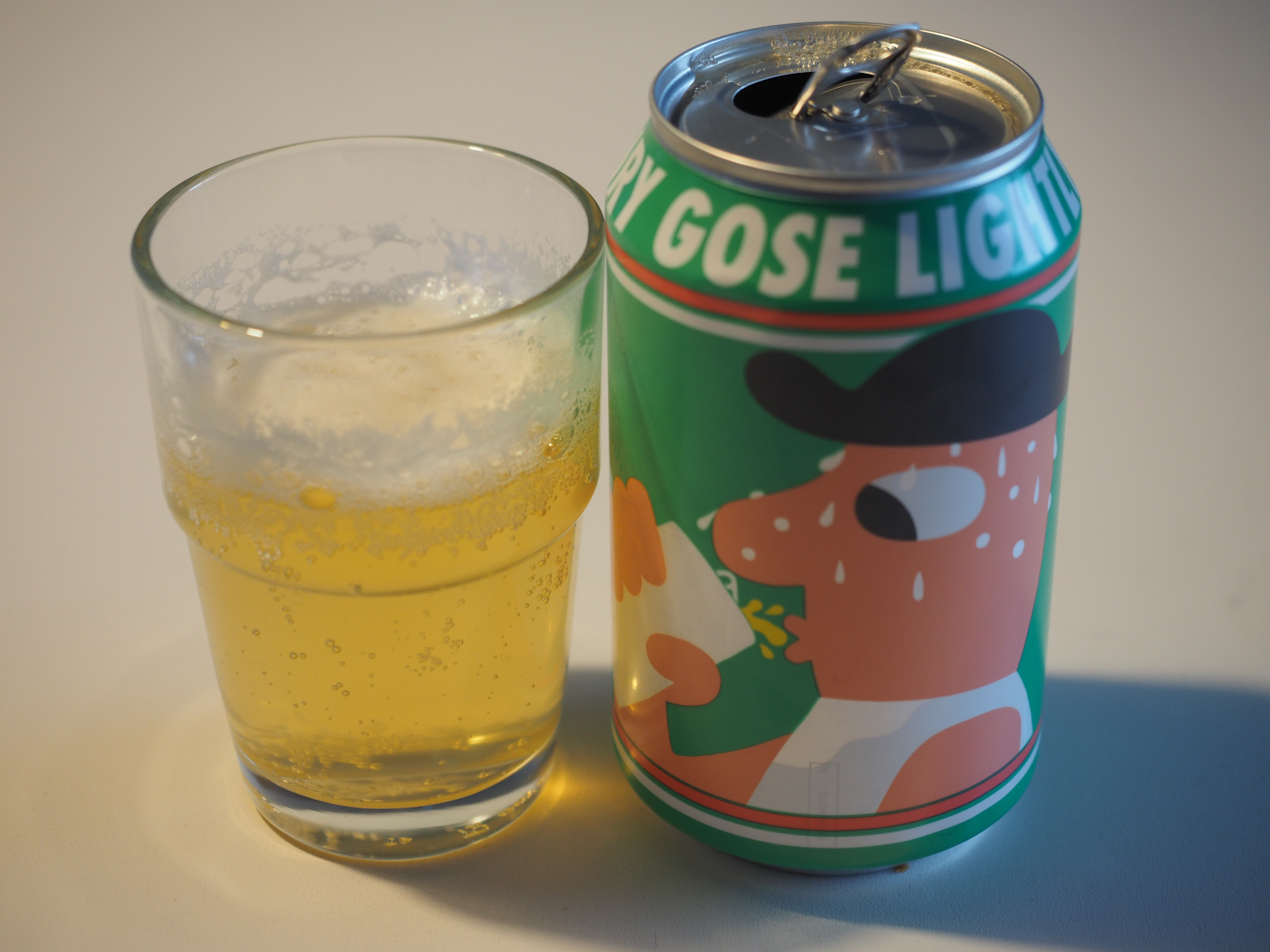
Henry Gose Lightly

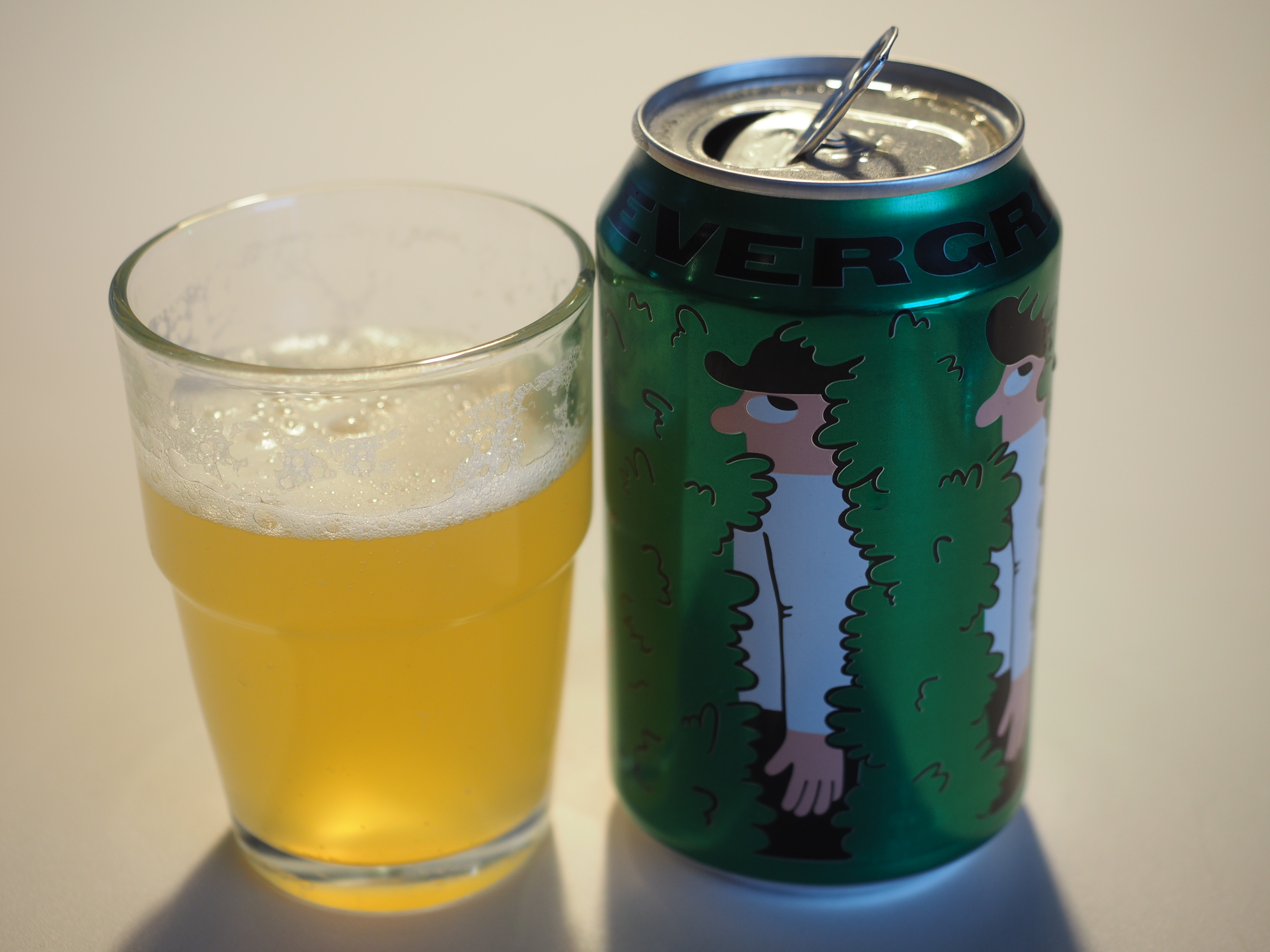
Evergreen

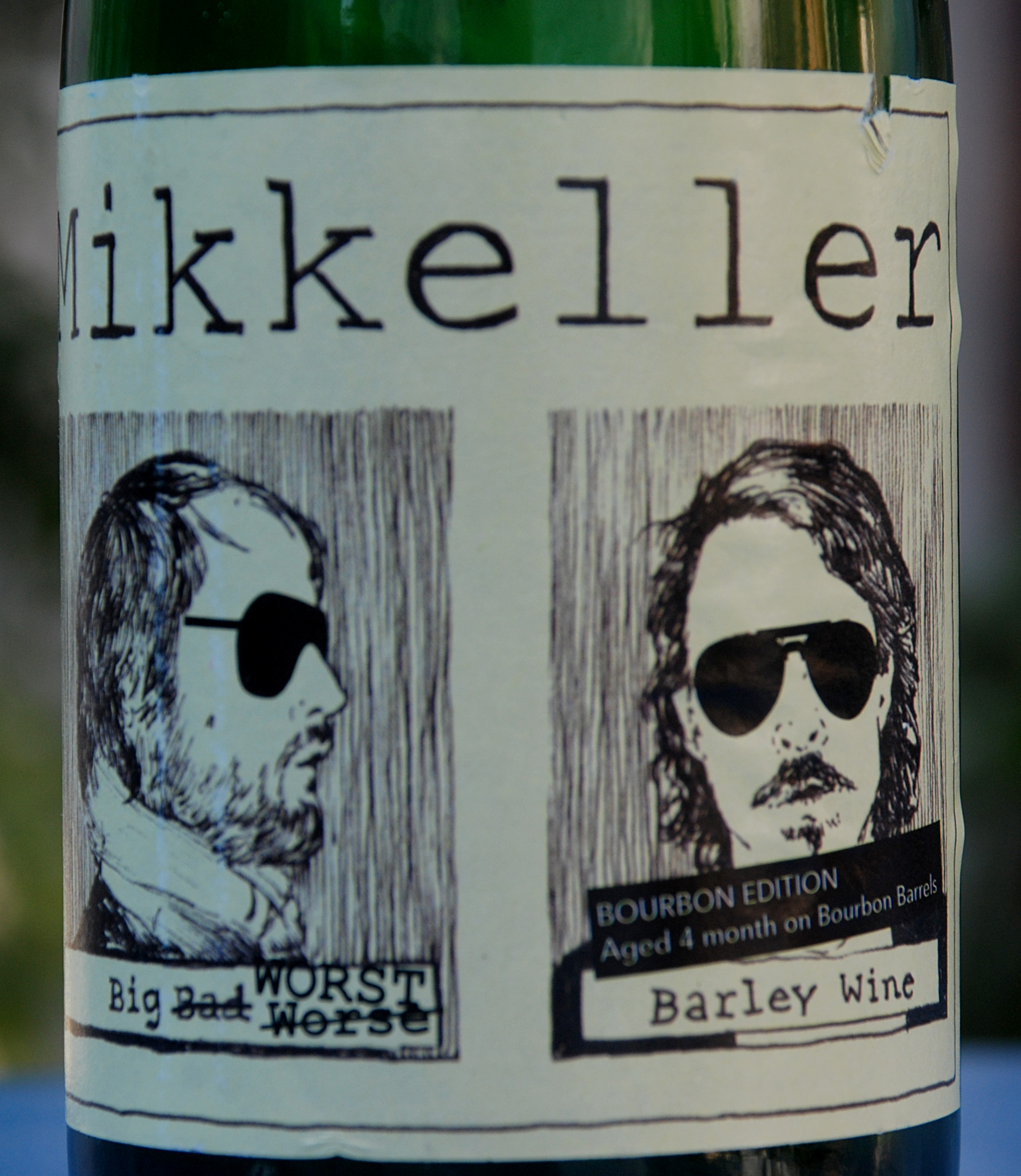
Mikkeller Bigworst Bourbon Barley Wine beer

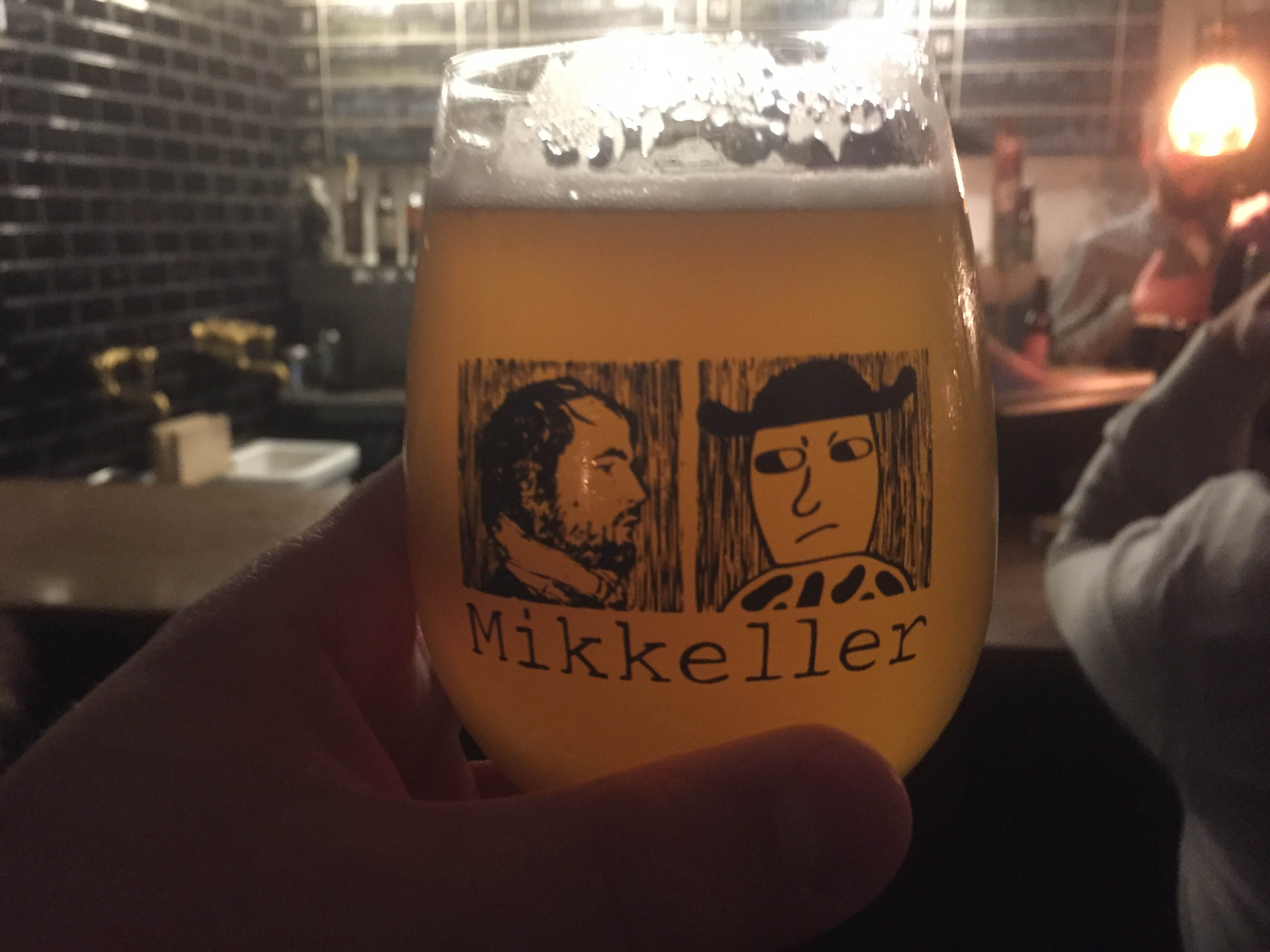
A glass of Mikkeller beer

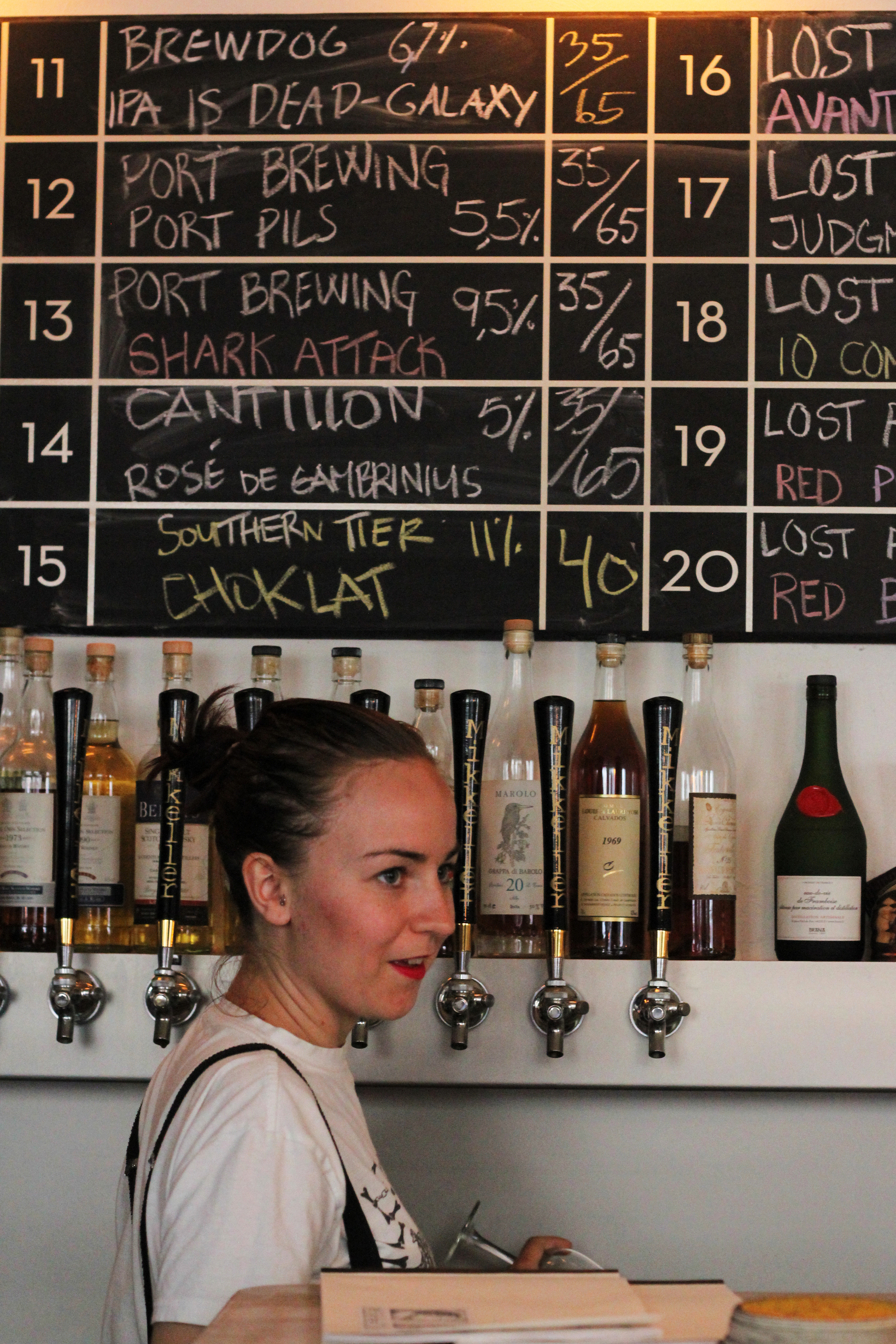
Other beers

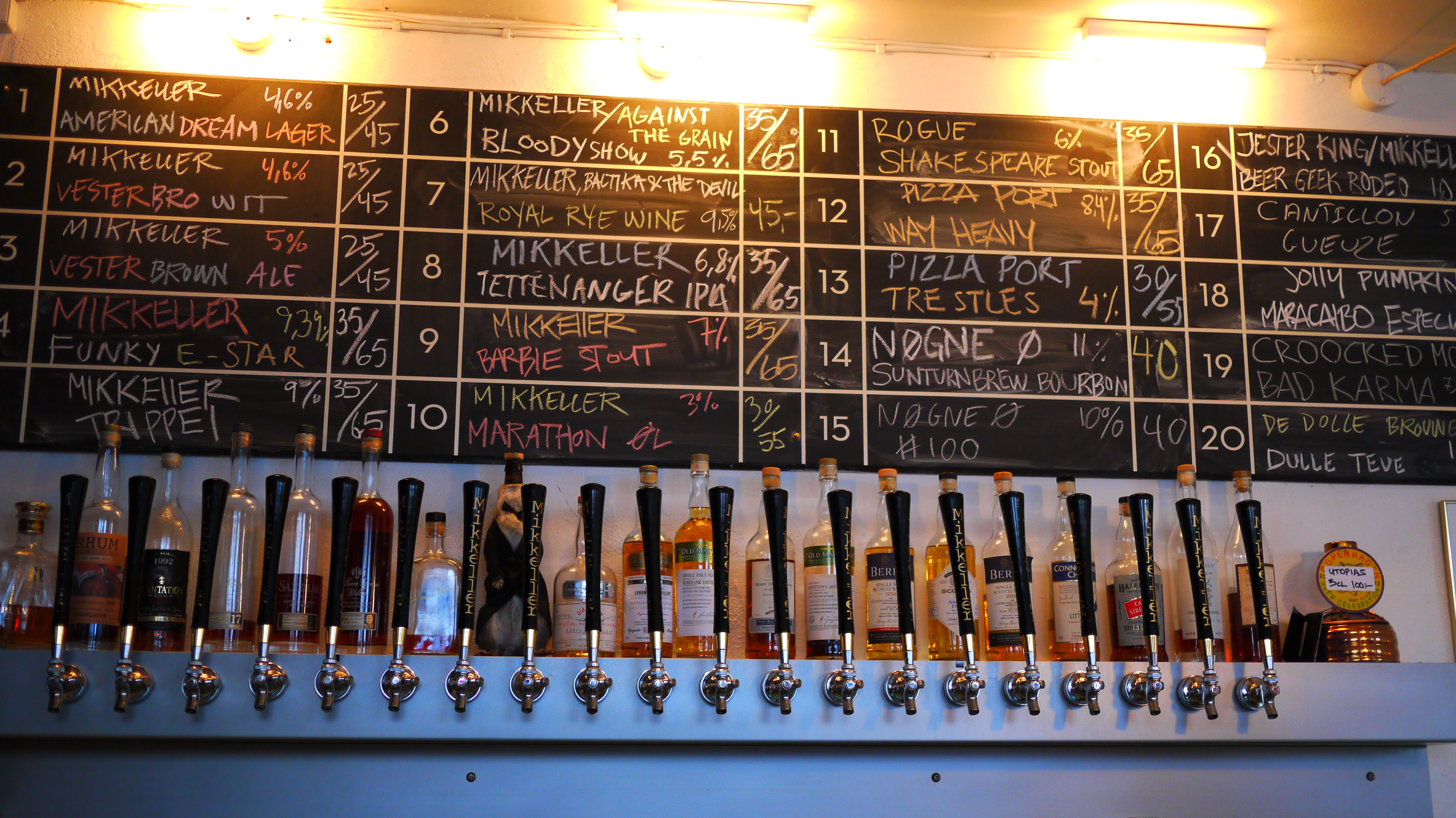
Other beers

== See also ==
- Barrel-aged beer
