= Lervig Aktiebryggeri =

Norwegian brewery

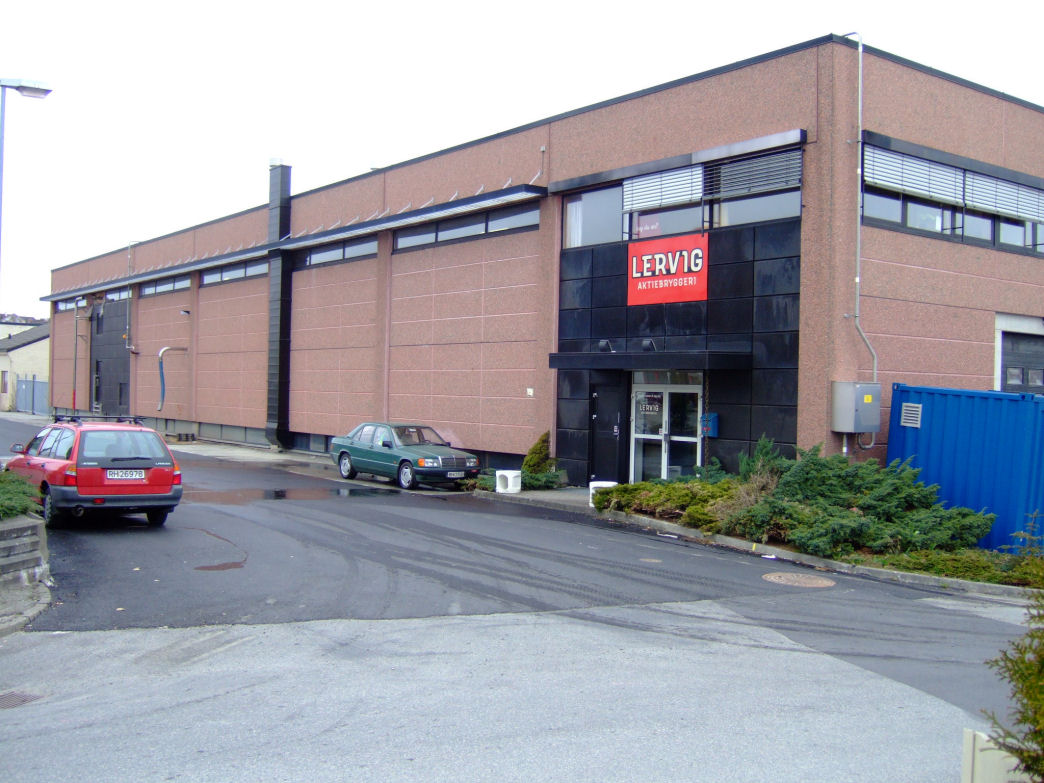
Lervig Aktiebryggeri's production facilities in Hillevåg

Lervig Aktiebryggeri is a Norwegian brewery. It was founded in 2003 in Stavanger when the production of Tou beer was moved to Oslo. From 2003 to 2005 the beer was produced by Macks Ølbryggeri in Tromsø. In 2005 the production was moved to Hillevåg in Stavanger. In the first years the brewery mostly produced pilsner as a substitute for the Tou pilsner.

In 2010 the brewery hired the American Mike Murphy as their head brewer, and made a turn towards craft beers. Heavy imperial stouts and hoppy New England IPAs are their most popular beers.

After they started producing NEIPAs the brewery has complained about the distribution to the government-owned liquor monopoly Vinmonopolet. An IPA the brewery produced in January 2017 did not go for sale until March. From June 1, 2017 the dairy company TINE started distributing the beer with their refrigerated trucks.

Lervig was on RateBeer's list of the Top 100 brewers in the world in 2014.

The company has taken part in collaborations with a number of other craft brewers including To Øl, Põhjala, Mikkeller, Evil Twin and Beavertown.

Lervig exports a third of their beers to the foreign market. In August 2017, of all the beer exported from Norway, 16.8% was from Lervig.

Lervig was started by the fund manager Kristoffer Stensrud. In 2018 the American investment fund Orkila Capital purchased 50% of the company. They spent 15 million dollars on shares, and a further 5 million on an emission. The investment fund already owned part of Danish brewery Mikkeller.

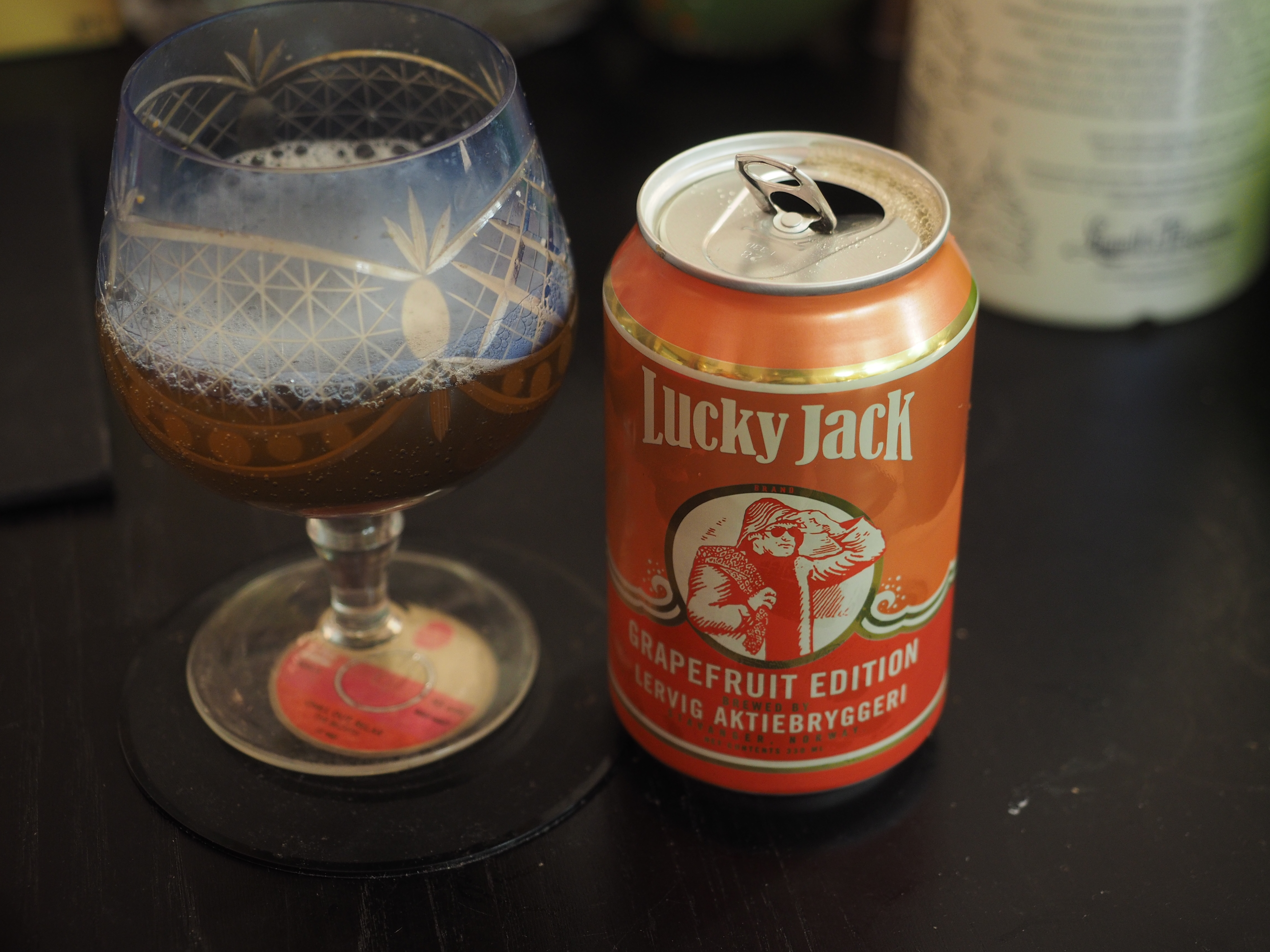
Lucky Jack Grapefruit Edition beer
