= Põhjala Brewery =

Craft brewer in Tallinn, Estonia

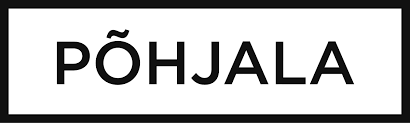

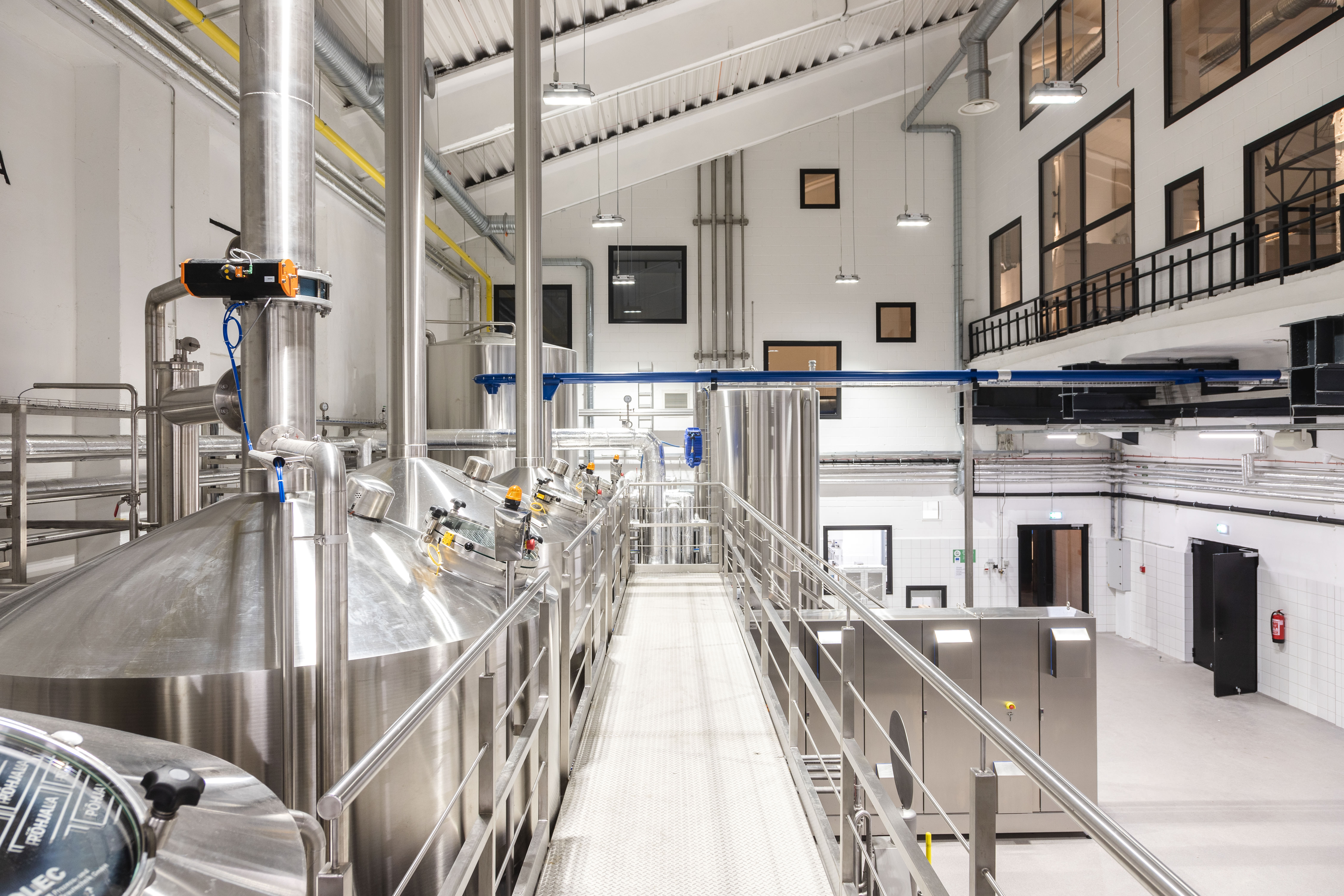
- Põhjala's 50 hl Rolec brewhouse
- Industry: Brewing
- Founded: 2011
- Founders: Enn Parel; Peeter Keek; Gren Noormets; Tiit Paananen
- Headquarters: Tallinn, Estonia
- Key people: Martin Vahtra (head brewer)
- Products: Craft beer
- Website: pohjalabeer.com

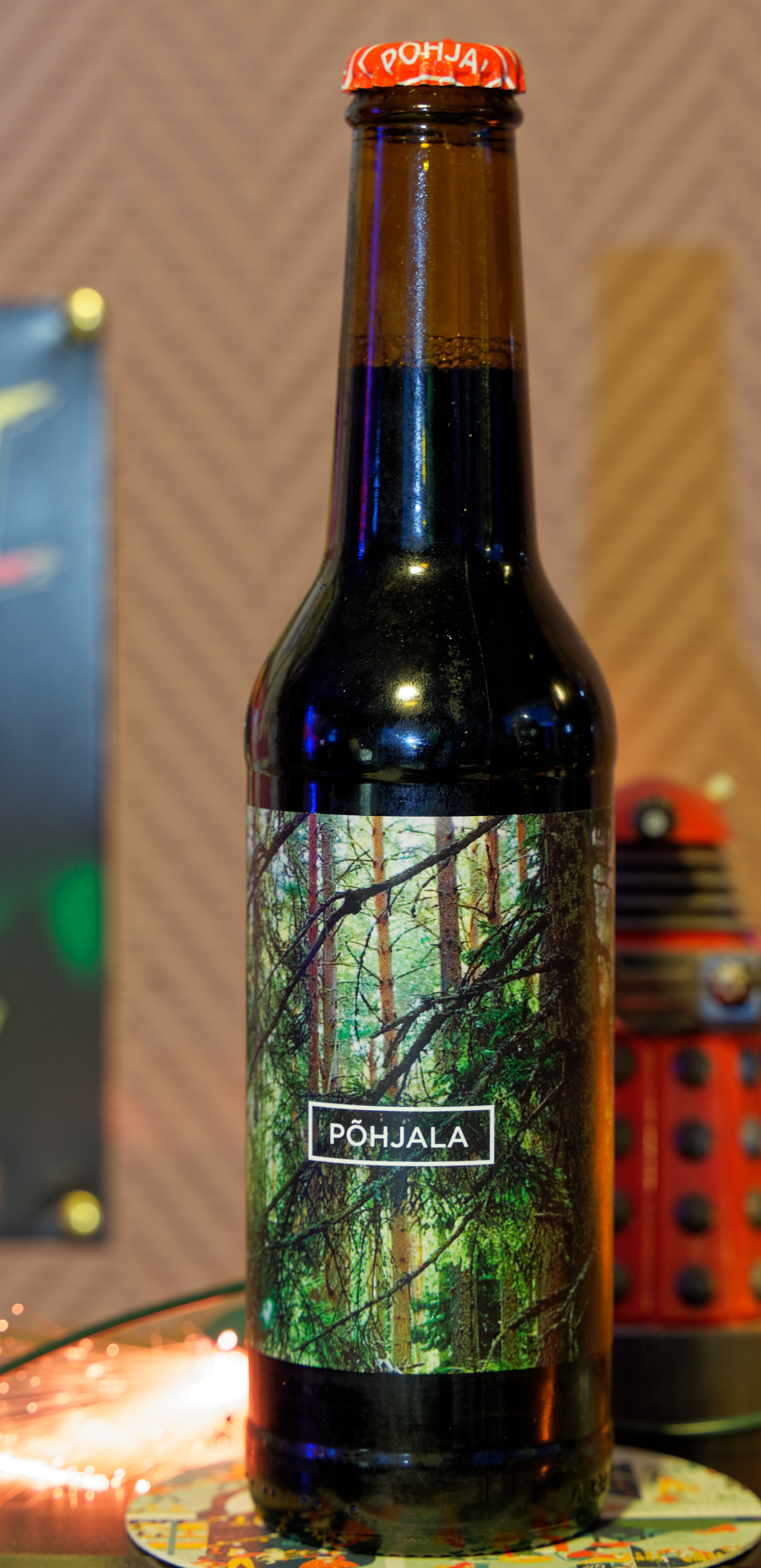
Põhjala's "Beery Christmas", 2019

Põhjala Brewery (Estonian: Põhjala pruulikoda) is a craft brewery in Tallinn, Estonia. Its name is Estonian for "northern realm". It is the largest craft brewery in the Baltic states and the only one to have been included in the Ratebeer "top 100" list of world breweries. In 2025 the company had a turnover of 5.02 million euros. Põhjala has a particular focus on porters, barrel ageing, and ingredients from the forests of Estonia.

== History ==
The brewery was founded in 2011 by four Estonian beer enthusiasts, who were soon joined by head brewer Chris Pilkington. The first Põhjala beer, Öö Imperial Baltic Porter, was contract-brewed before the company's original brewery opened in Tallinn's Nõmme district in April 2014.

In 2015, the company opened its first bar "Speakeasy" near Tallinn's main railway station.

In 2018, nearly 4.9 million euros were invested in moving production to a new brewery in the Noblessner area of Tallinn. The average capacity of the brewery is 1,200 hectolitres per month, and 6,000 bottles an hour can be filled on a new bottling line. The facility also houses a laboratory, shop, sauna and taproom with 24 taps.

In 2019, Põhjala opened a pop-up bar in the Chinese capital, Beijing.

In 2021, the brewery sponsored the Põhjala disc golf marathon, with 300 competitors in Jõulumäe, Estonia.

In 2022, Põhjala opened Põhja Konn bar in the Telliskivi area of Tallinn. It serves only Estonian craft beer from Põhjala and other local craft breweries.

On 15 March 2023, Estonian president Alar Karis visited Põhjala Brewery together with German president Frank-Walter Steinmeier.

In April 2024, Põhjala's former head brewer Chris Pilkington and his wife Kristina opened Tuletorn Brewing, a brewpub in Tallinn's Kopli district.

== Põhjala beers ==
Põhjala's best-selling beer is Virmalised, an India pale ale which accounts for over a quarter of total production. In addition to a core range of beers, the brewery produces numerous specials and has collaborated with craft brewers such as To Øl, Lervig, De Struise, Jester King and Jing-A Brewing Co.

The Cellar Series is a range of dark, barrel-aged beers while the Forest Series uses rare botanicals and forest ingredients. Põhjala exported 65 percent of its production in 2021. The main foreign markets were the Netherlands, Finland, France, China, the United Kingdom and the United States.

The brewery has been criticised for producing its Baltic porters using top fermentation, rather than the bottom- or cold fermentation often used for the beer style. In 2020 Põhjala collaborated with Polish brewers Pinta to produce Baltic Pride. It is an imperial Baltic porter, featuring a blend of fresh bottom-fermented Baltic porter and barrel aged top-fermented Baltic porter.

== Tallinn Craft Beer Weekend ==
Tallinn Craft Beer Weekend is an annual craft beer festival organised by Põhjala Brewery, which first took place in 2015. It features over 40 Estonian and international breweries, showcasing over 200 of their beers.

== Images of Põhjala Brewery ==
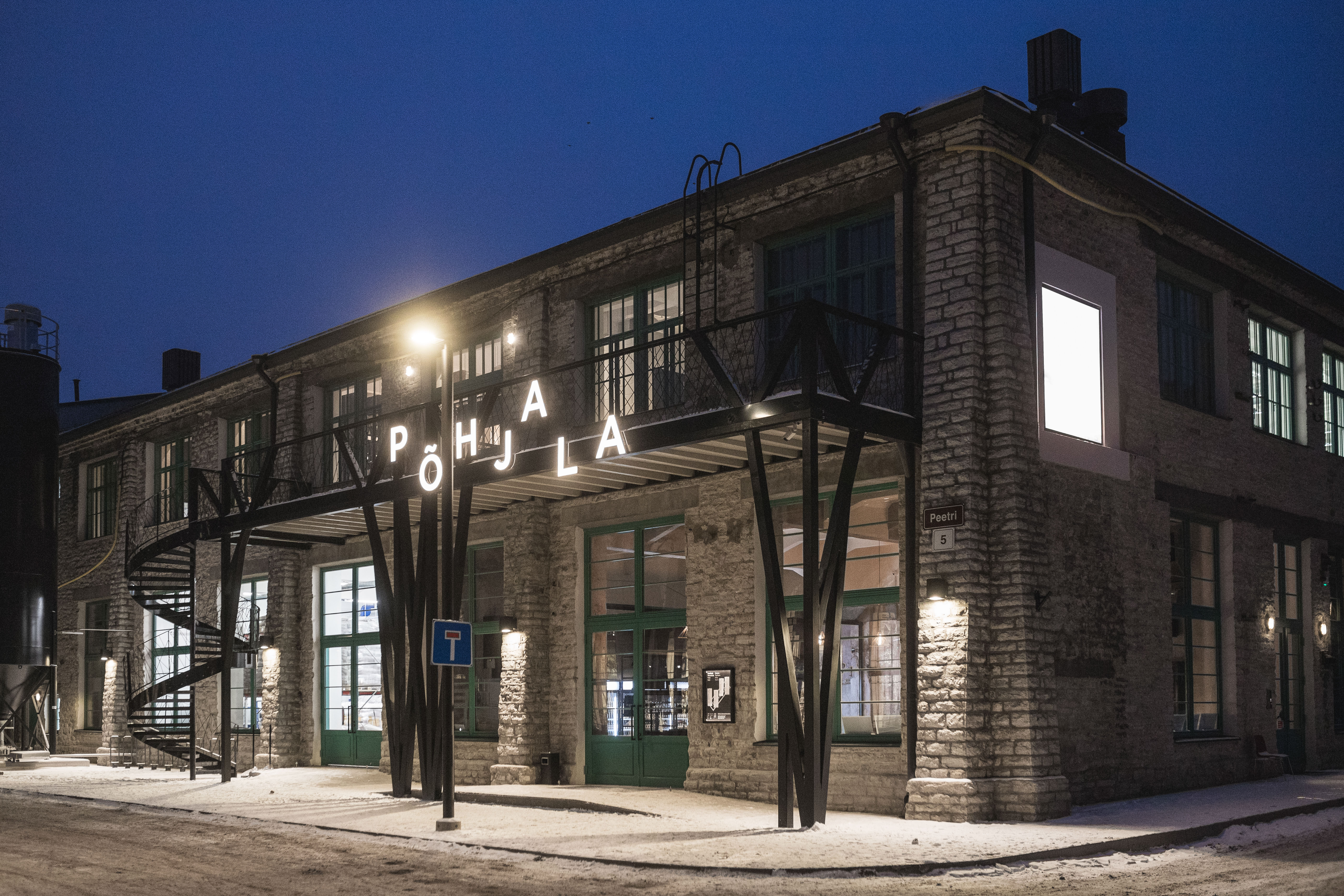
Põhjala Brewery & Tap Room

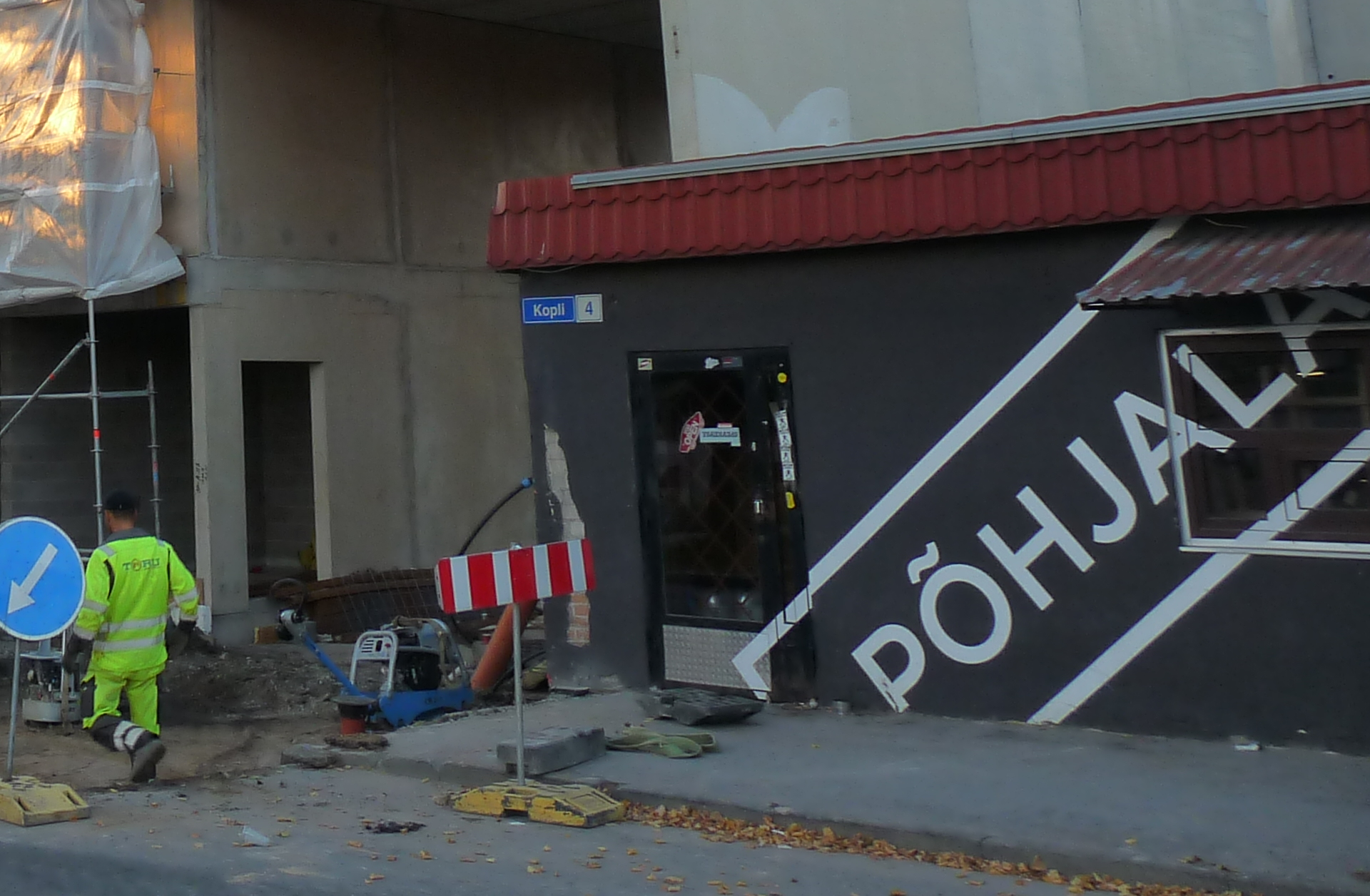
Põhjala's first bar, "Speakeasy"

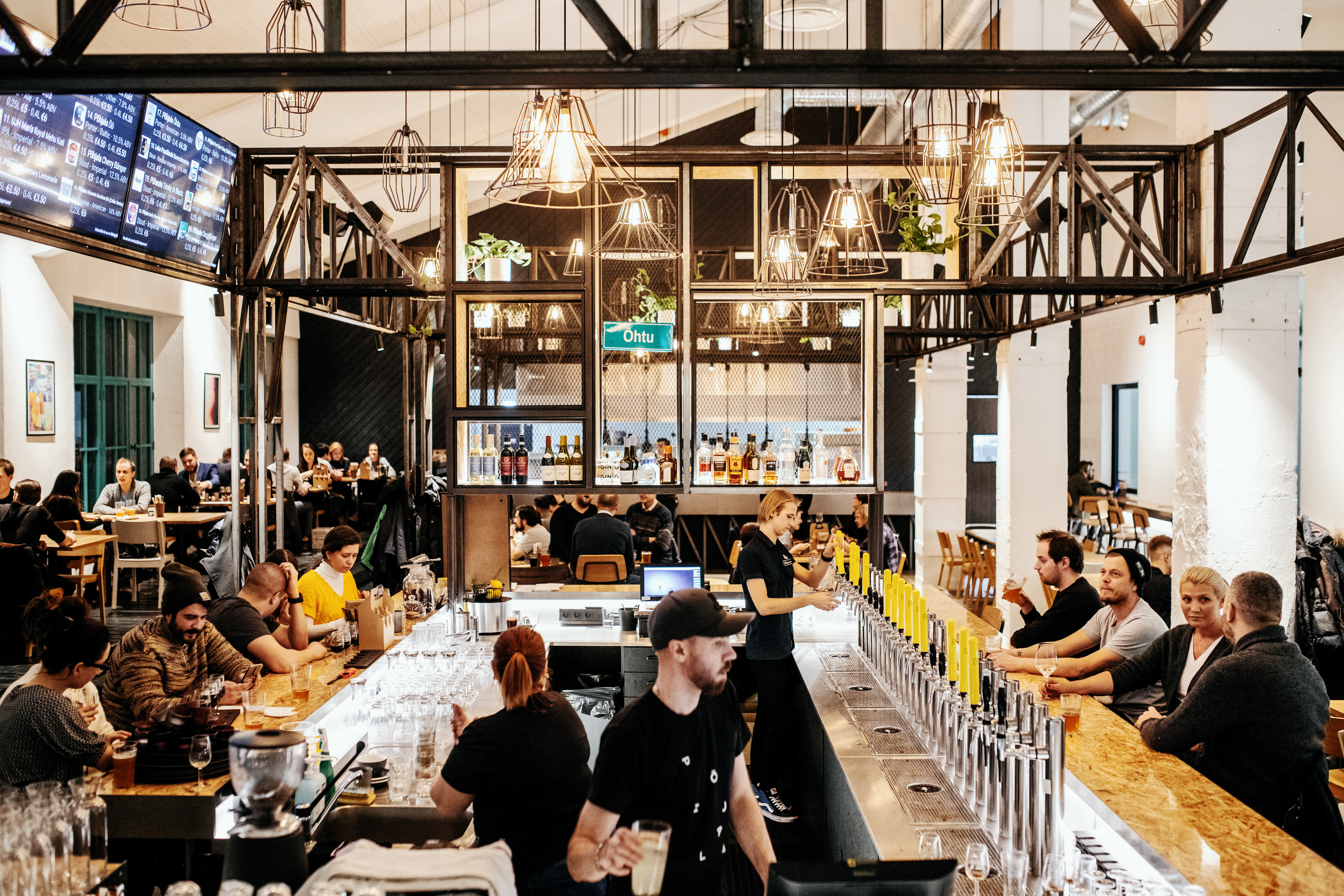
The Tap Room

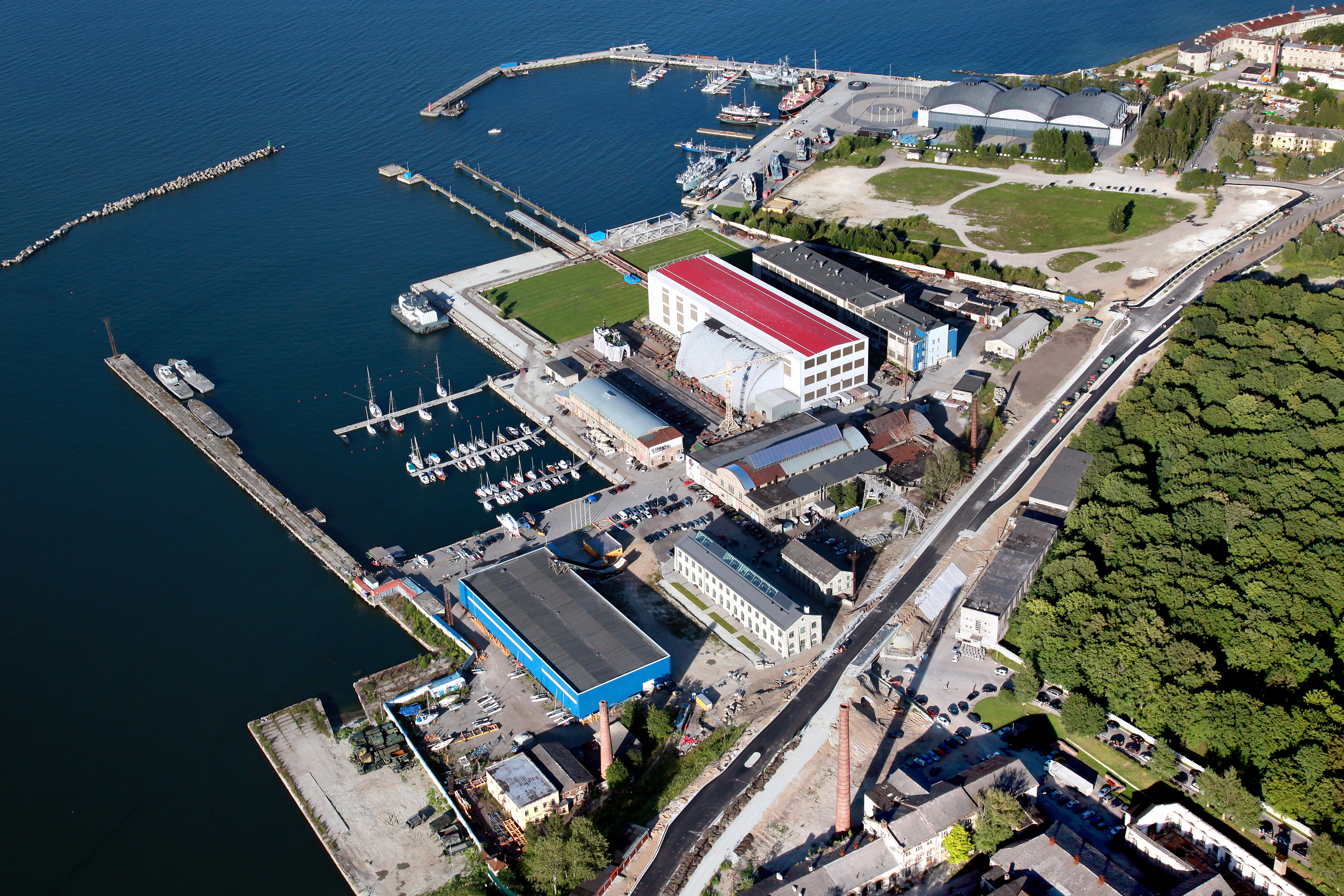
Noblessner Harbour
(Põhjala is to the bottom right)

== See also ==
- Beer in Estonia
- Barrel-aged beer
- Seaplane Harbour Museum - also located in Noblessner Harbour
