= To Øl =

Danish craft brewery

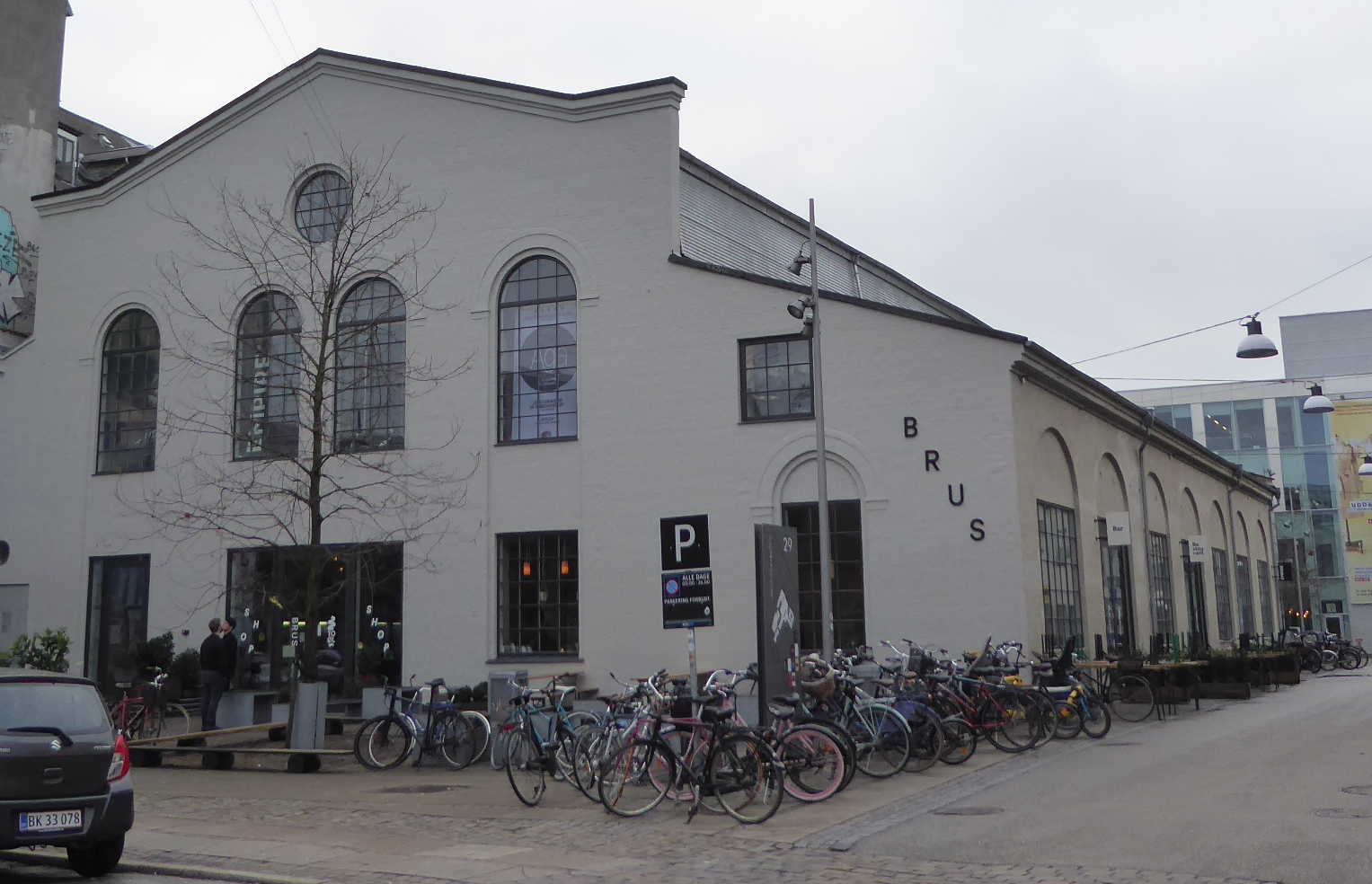
- Brus brewpub, Copenhagen
- Industry: Brewing
- Founded: 2010
- Founders: Tore Gynther; Tobias Emil Jensen
- Headquarters: Copenhagen, Denmark
- Products: Craft beer
- Owner: Tore Gynther
- Website: toolbeer.dk

To Øl (Danish for "Two Beers") is an international craft brewery based in Denmark.

== History ==
To Øl was founded by Tore Gynther and Tobias Emil Jensen in 2010 as a gypsy brewer, with brewing primarily taking place at De Proefbrouwerij in Belgium. In 2016, To Øl opened the brewpub "BRUS" in the Nørrebro district of Copenhagen. It is a combined bar, shop and restaurant with its own brewery. Beers produced at the brewpub are also canned on site and distributed under the brand name "To Øl CPH". A second BRUS bar opened in Oslo, Norway in 2017.

In 2020 production started at its brewery, known as "To Øl City", in Svinninge, Denmark. The facility spans over 26,000 square metres in an old Beauvais factory, and in addition to housing its 80 hectolitre brewhouse it has become a hub for other craft beverage producers.

== Products and collaborations ==
To Øl cooperates with Mikkeller as co-owner of a number of craft beer bars and shops in Denmark, Iceland and the Faroe Islands.

To Øl brews a wide range of different craft beers, including an alcohol-free beer, and exports to over 40 countries. The company has taken part in collaborations with other craft brewers including Mikkeller, Põhjala, Lervig, and Brewdog.

The company is reportedly developing a powdered craft beer in cooperation with a German food processing company.

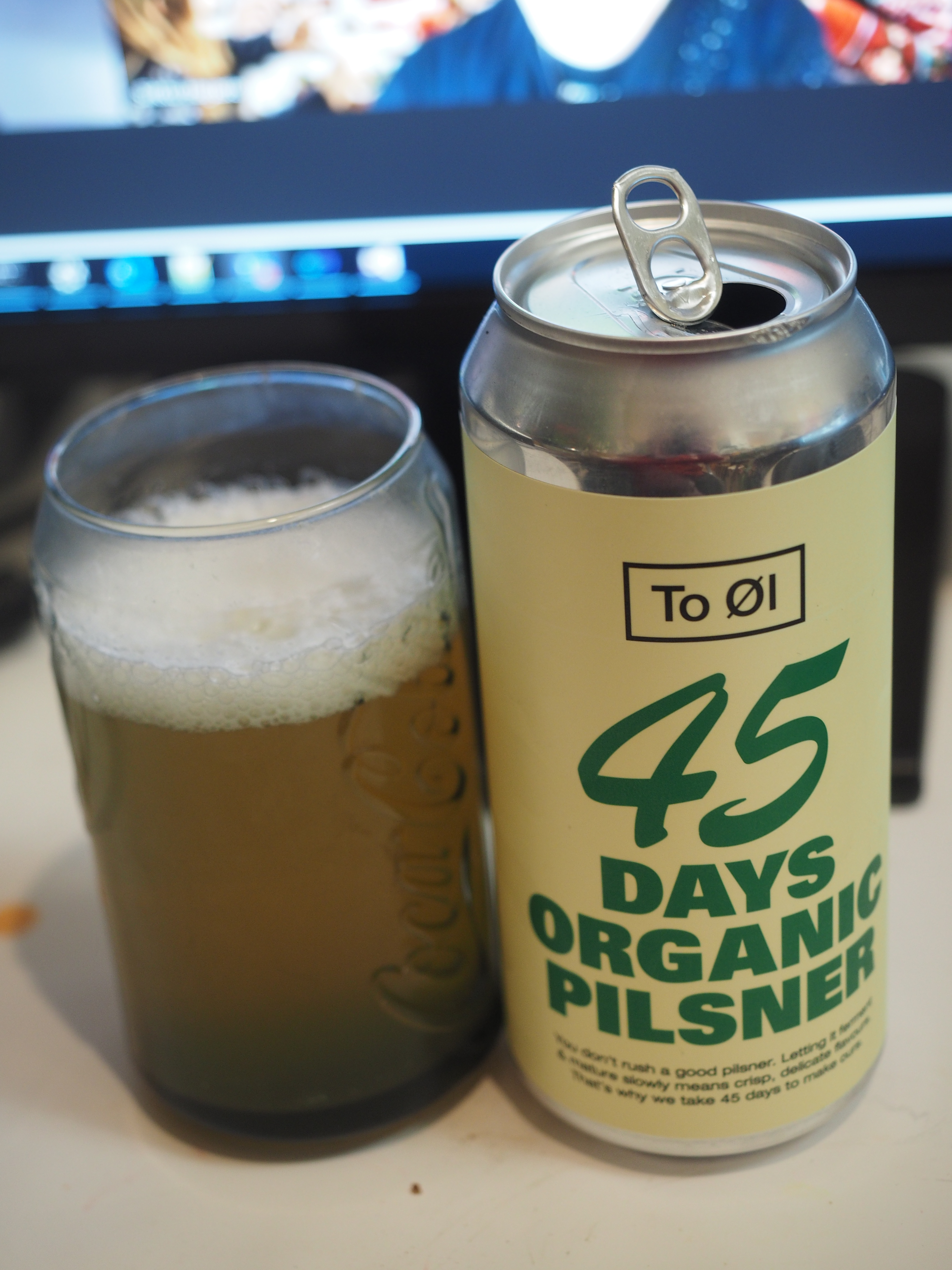
To Øl 45 Days Organic Pilsner

== See also ==
- Craft beer
- Barrel-aged beer
