= Laugar Brewery =

Brewery in Gordexola, Spain

Coordinates: 43°18′38.06″N 03°06′15.10″W

- Location: Gordexola, Spain
- Opened: 2014
- Annual production volume: 1500 hL
- Website: www.laugarbrewery.com

Laugar Brewery is a Spanish brewery founded in 2011 in Barakaldo by Eneko Neira, Txus Cabrera, Sergio Valiente and Aingeru del Campo. Their name means four beers in Basque, in reference to its four founders. Eneko had started working in Bleder brewery in Barcelona in 2008, and then convinced the rest of the crew to start homebrewing. After that, they were soon joined by Eder García, who was Eneko's classmate and also had a vast experience in homebrewing.

They started brewing small batches for local bars in Bilbao, and after attending Birrasana festival in 2013, they were invited to Borefts. After that, in 2014 they decide to set up a brewery, located in Gordexola, 18 Km away from Bilbao. In 2017, they were producing 1500 hL. a year.

They have brewed collaboration brews with European breweries like De Molen, Alvinne or Naparbier.

== Events ==
Since 2014 they organize the festival Rock & Beer in their taproom in Gordexola, and they also hold a yearly event, Tovarisch Day, when they serve several versions of their most appreciated Imperial Stout, Aupa Tovarisch.

== Awards and recognition ==
Laugar Aurrera Stanitsa is considered the best Spanish beer according to Ratebeer (2019).

Laugar Funeralópolis is considered 2nd best Spanish beer according to Untappd

Laugar Braskadi won the gold medal in Mondial de la Biére 2016 in Montreal.
