= Beer in South Korea =

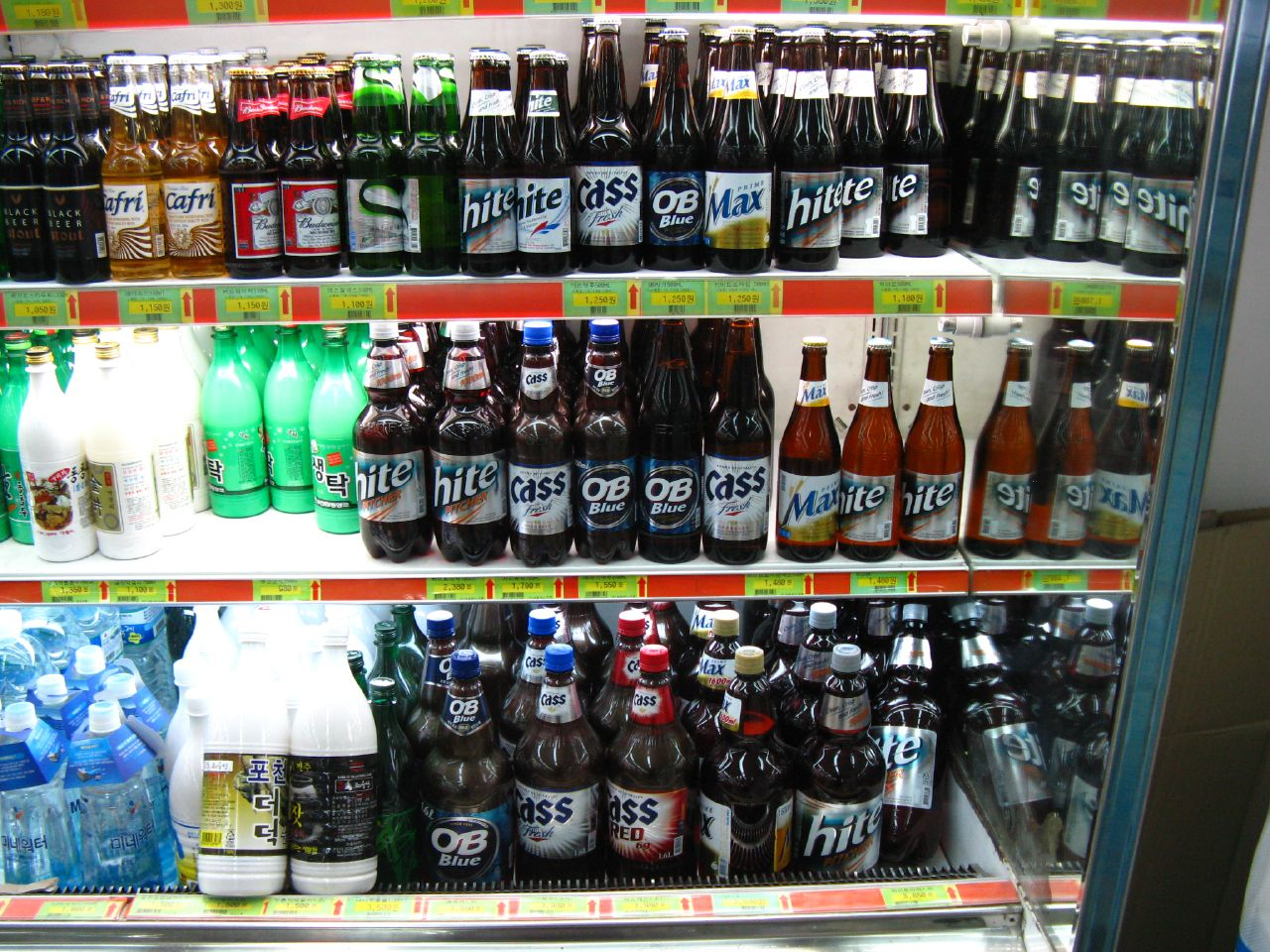
- South Korean beer on display for sale in July 2008

Korean name
- Hangul: 맥주
- Hanja: 麥酒
- RR: maekju
- MR: maekchu
- IPA: mɛ̝k̚.t͈ɕu

Beer, called maekju (Korean: 맥주; Hanja: 麥酒) in Korean, was first introduced to Korea in the early 20th century. Seoul's first brewery opened in 1908. Two current major breweries date back to the 1930s. The third brewery established in Korea, Jinro Coors Brewery, was founded in the 1990s. It was later acquired by Oriental Breweries (OB). Hite Breweries's former name was Chosun Breweries, which was established in 1933. The company changed its name to Hite Breweries in 1998. OB Breweries established as Showa Kirin Breweries in 1933. The company changed its name to OB Breweries in 1995.

The South Korean beer market is currently dominated by two major manufacturers, Hite-Jinro and OB, with several brands being sold in the local market. Most restaurants and bars in Korea only have one of these beer brands on tap (Hite or OB's Cass), as they are largely regarded to be similar in taste and price (they are mostly brewed from rice). Imported beers are widely available in Korea, but are generally expensive - usually costing at least ₩8,000 and as much as ₩15,000 for a pint of Guinness in bars in downtown Seoul, versus approximately ₩3,000 for local brands. Recently, microbreweries have sprouted up throughout the country, showing increasing signs of sophistication. Out of South Korea's mass-produced beers, only two are brewed from 100% barley malt: Max (Hite) and OB Golden Lager.

The lack of microbreweries in the South Korean market is attributed to onerous government regulations. This has constrained small-size brewers from supplying beer to locations under their ownership. These laws were eventually relaxed in June 2011, granting several small players a share in the local beer market.

A growing trend in South Korea is home brewing. While ingredients and supplies are still limited, there are many households brewing their own beer. Various brewing clubs also exist to help guide newcomers through the processes of home brewing in South Korea; one such club being Homebrew Korea.

== Domestic brands ==
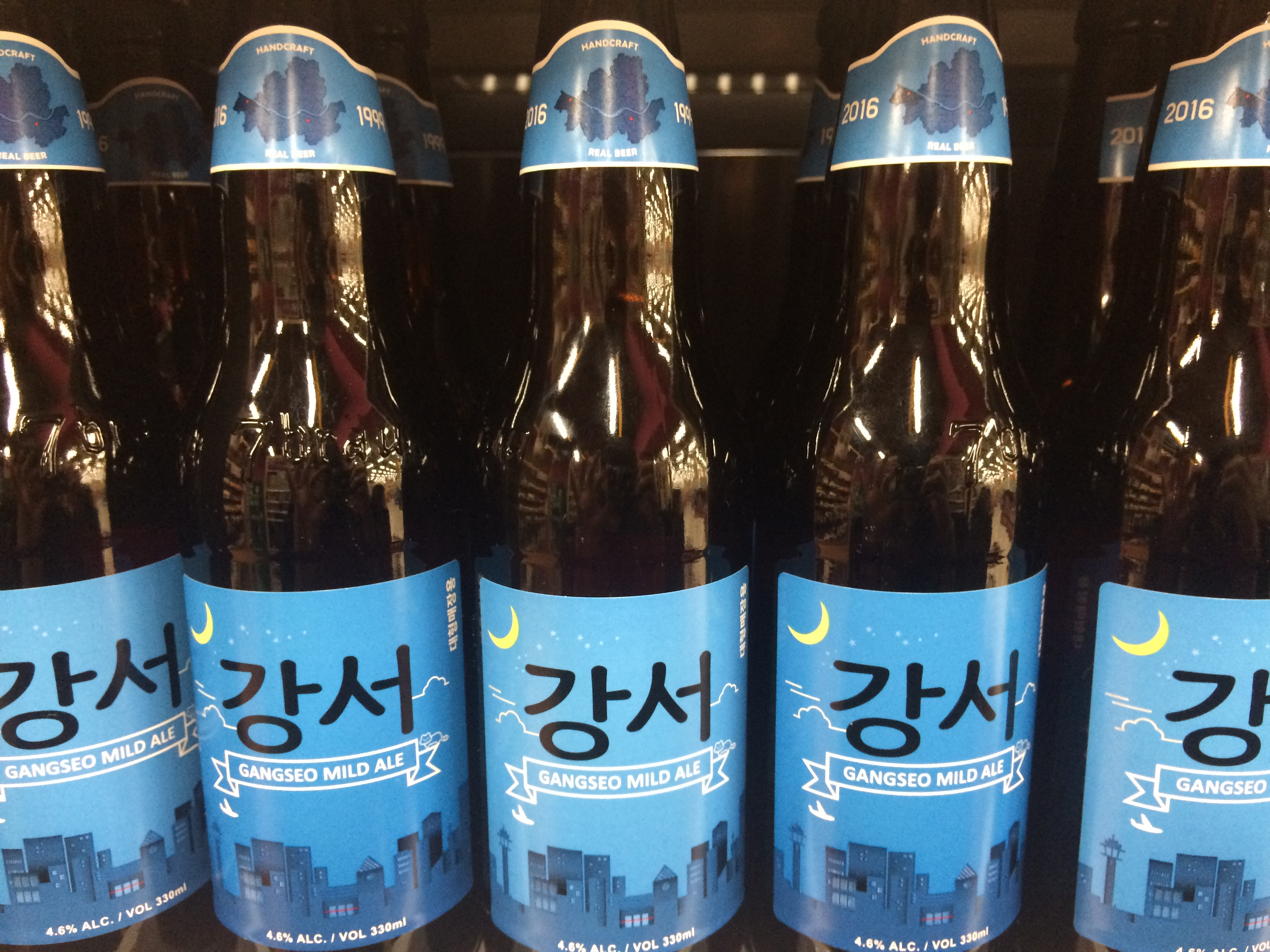
Gangseo beer

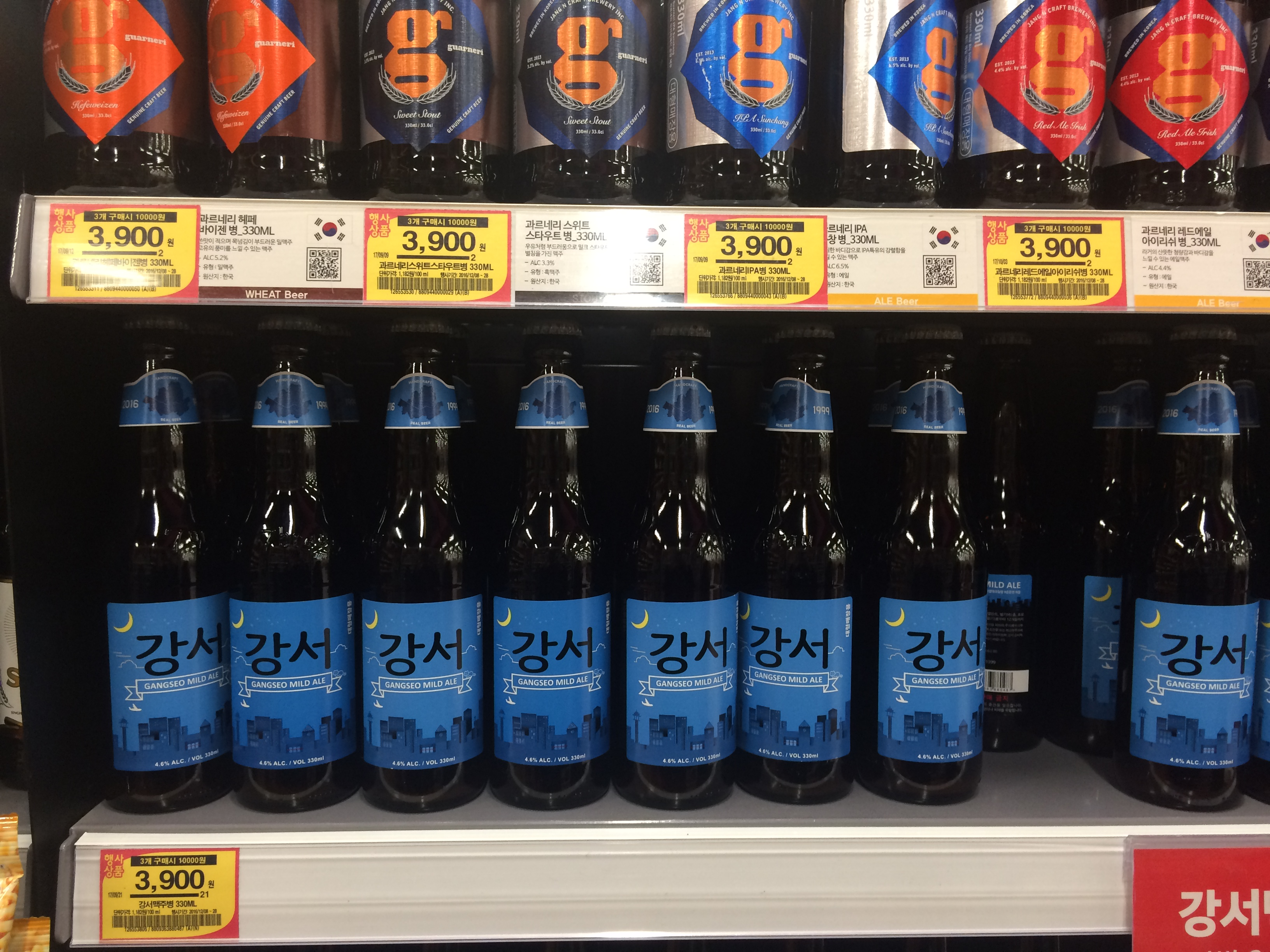
Gangseo beer

- HiteJinro: Hite, Max, Dry D, S, Stout, Lager Beer, Prime Draft, J Draft, Queen's Ale
  - HiteJinro is a merger between two alcohol companies: Hite Brewery and Jinro. Hite Brewery was established in 1933 as a liquor company. Jinro was established in 1924 as the first Korean beer company. In 2006, Jinro was acquired by Hite, a popular beverage company. HiteJinro is the world's leading producer of Soju. HiteJinro manufactures many types of alcoholic beverages.
- Oriental Brewery (OB): OB Golden Lager, Cass brands (Cass Fresh, Cass Light, Cass Red, Cass Lemon), Cafri, Aleston
  - Oriental Brewery (OB) was established in 1933. OB Golden Lager was launched in 2011.
- Lotte Liquor: Kloud
  - Lotte Chilsung was established in May, 1950. Their original product was a lemon-lime soft-drink. Since then, they have created a multitude of beverages.
- Korea Craft Brewery: ARK, Hitachino
  - KCB has collaborated with other brands such as SM and Line Friends.
- 7Bräu : Gangseo
  - 7Bräu started as a small pub in the Gangseo district of Seoul, thus lending the name of their signature beer. It is the first Korean beer named after a district (e.g. Tsingtao Brewery in China and Brooklyn Brewery in Brooklyn, New York). The label design features an air control tower, a reference to Gimpo International Airport, which is also located in the Gangseo district.
- Energin: Kimpo
  - A beer made from ginseng and rice. The rice is locally cultivated in Gimpo, South Korea.

=== Notable beers ===
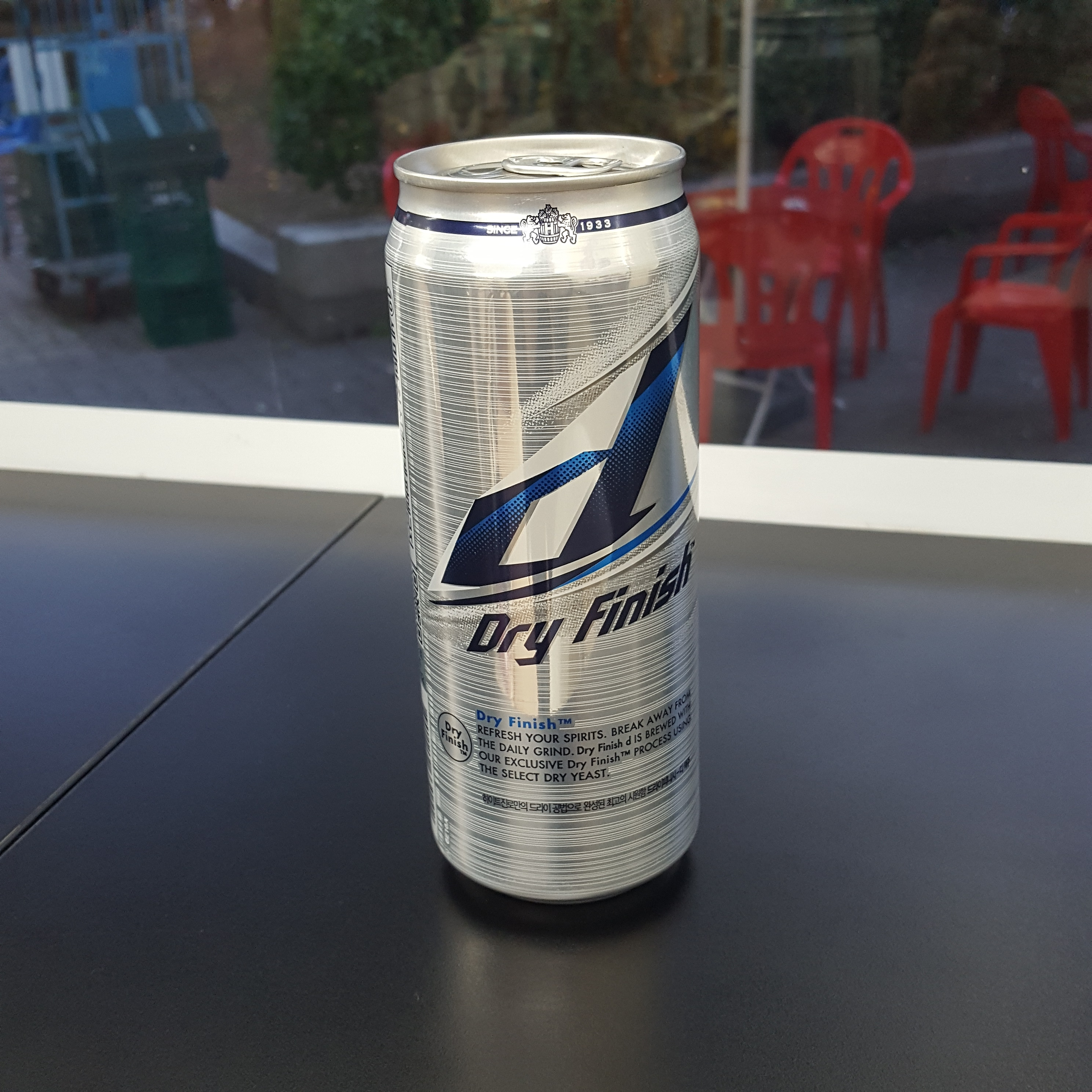
Dryfinish, Cass

- HiteJinro
  - Hite: A pale lager beer launched in 1993. Hite is 4.3% abv.
  - Max: Launched in 2006 as the first all malt Korean beer. A special edition of Max beer is made annually. Max is 4.5% abv.
  - Dry D: Launched as a dry type beer in 2010. The brewing method was made in cooperation with the Danish brewing company, Danbrew. It is made using a select dry yeast. Dry D is 4.8% abv.
  - S: A low calorie beer produced by super attenuated brewing. It contains 0.5g of fiber per 100ml. S is 3.8% abv.
  - Stout: A dark beer launched in 1991. It is a lager-type black beer made with German black malt. Stout is 5% abv.
  - Lager Beer: Made from malt and German hops. Lager Beer is 5% abv.
  - Prime Draft: Sold in regular and Green. Regular is 5% abv with Green being 4.5% abv.
  - J Draft: J Draft is 5% abv.
  - Queen's Ale: A pale ale beer top fermented and completed with a triple hopping process. Queen's Ale is 5.4% abv.

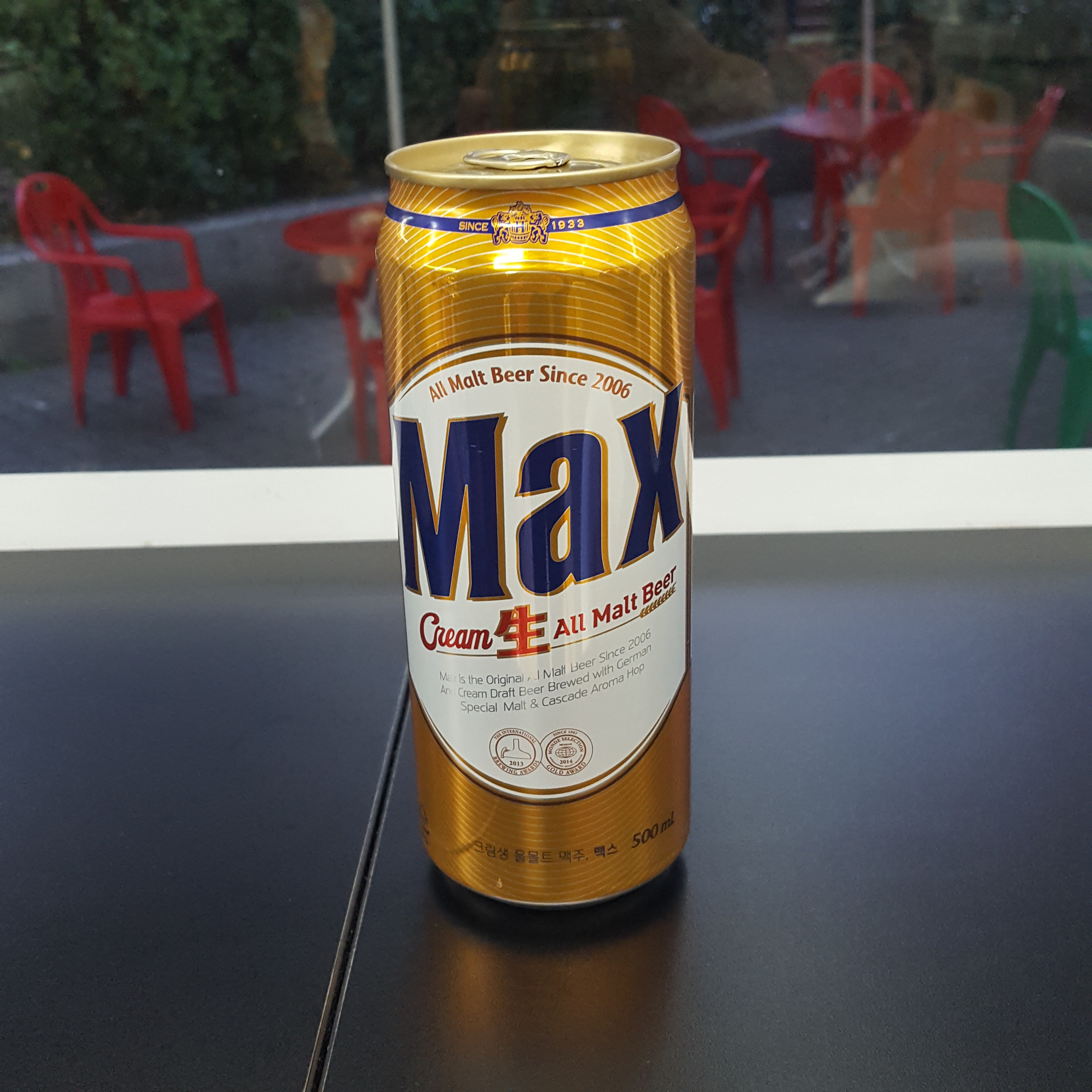
Max

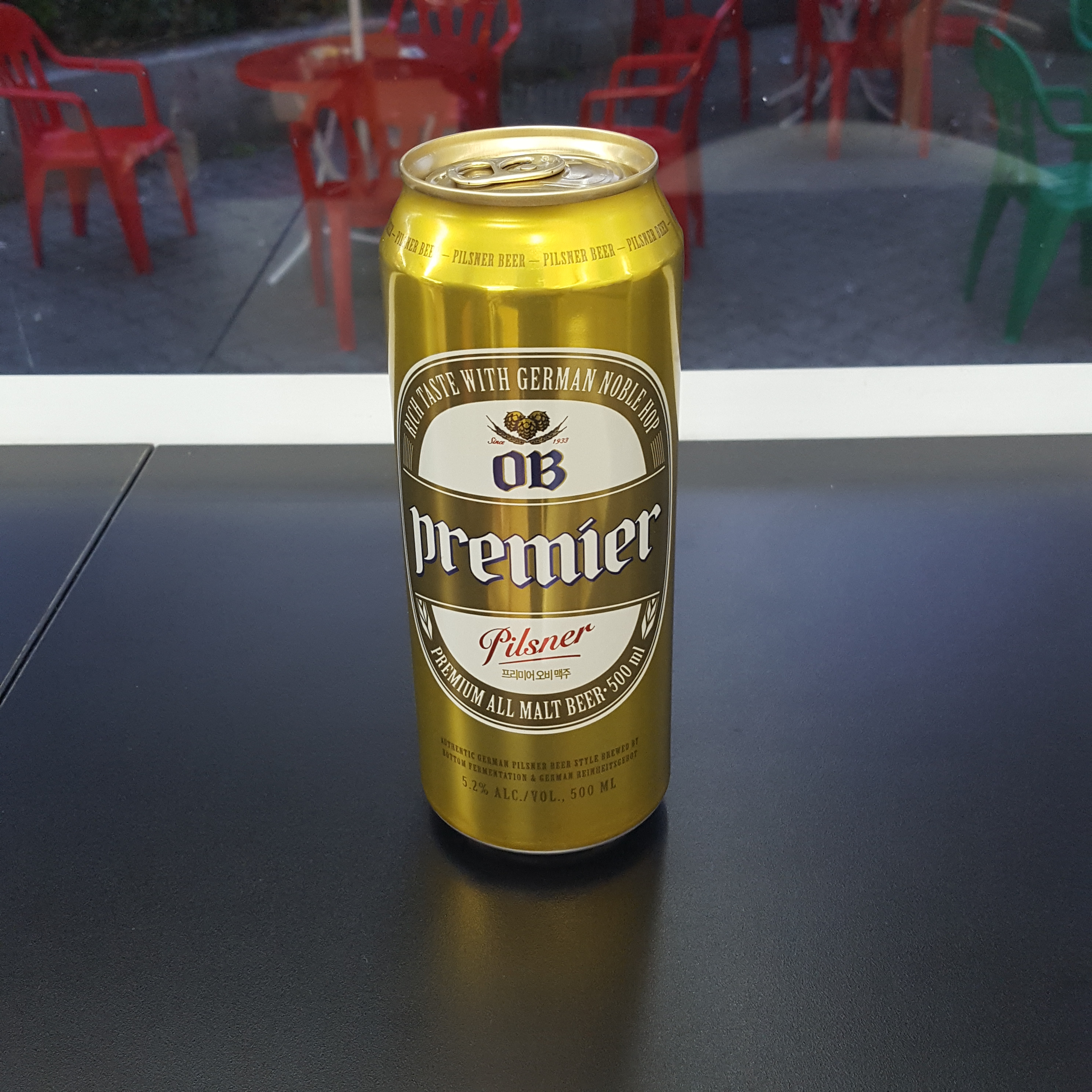
OB premier

- Oriental Brewery (OB)
  - Cass brands (Cass Fresh, Cass Light, Cass Red, Cass Lemon): There are several different beers for sale under the Cass brand name. Cass is a non-pasteurized lager. At 6.9% abv, Cass Red is the strongest variety currently sold.
  - OB Golden Lager: An all malt beer made primarily from Perle hops. OB Golden Lager is 4.8% abv.
  - Cafri: Launched as a premium beer by OB in 1995. It is the first Korean beer to have a transparent bottle and a twist-off cap. Cafri is 4.2% abv.
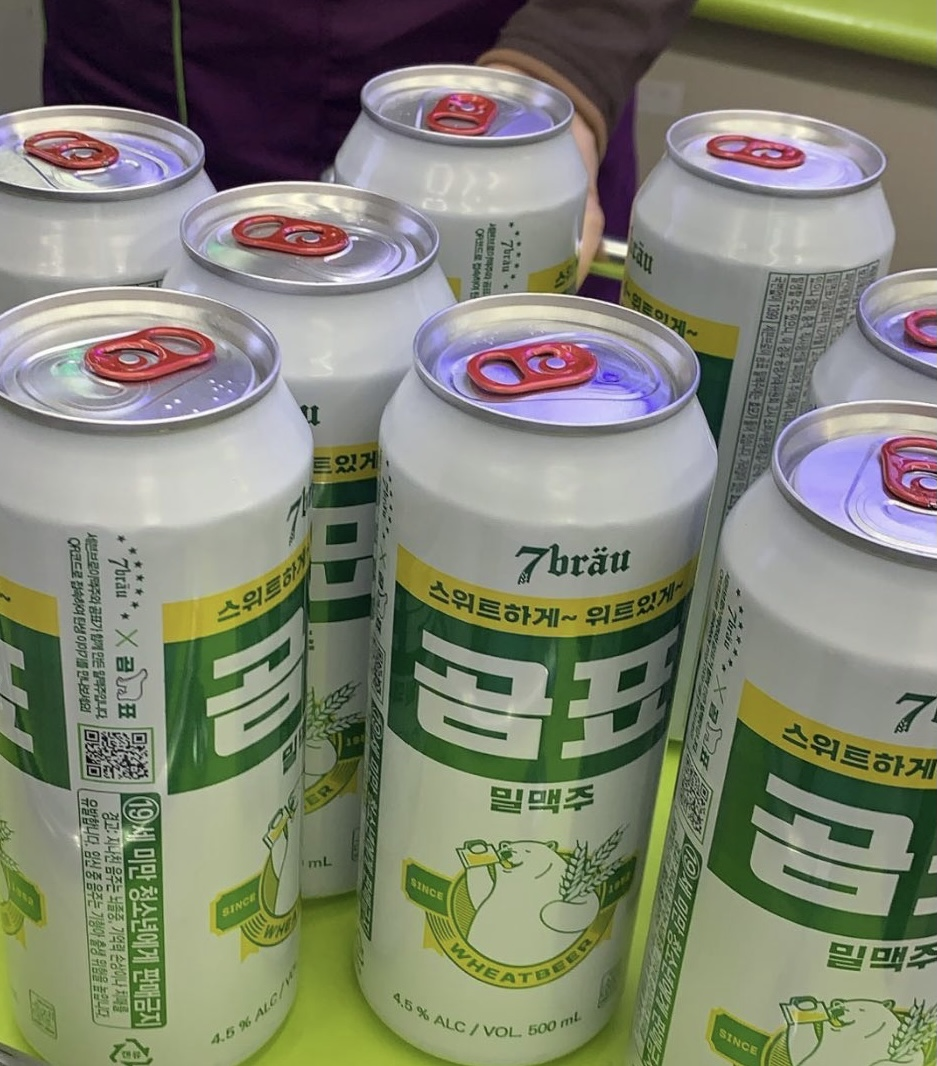
  - Gompyo Wheat Beer
    Aleston: A British style ale sold in a black and brown variety. Aleston Black is 5% abv with Aleston Brown being 5.2% abv.
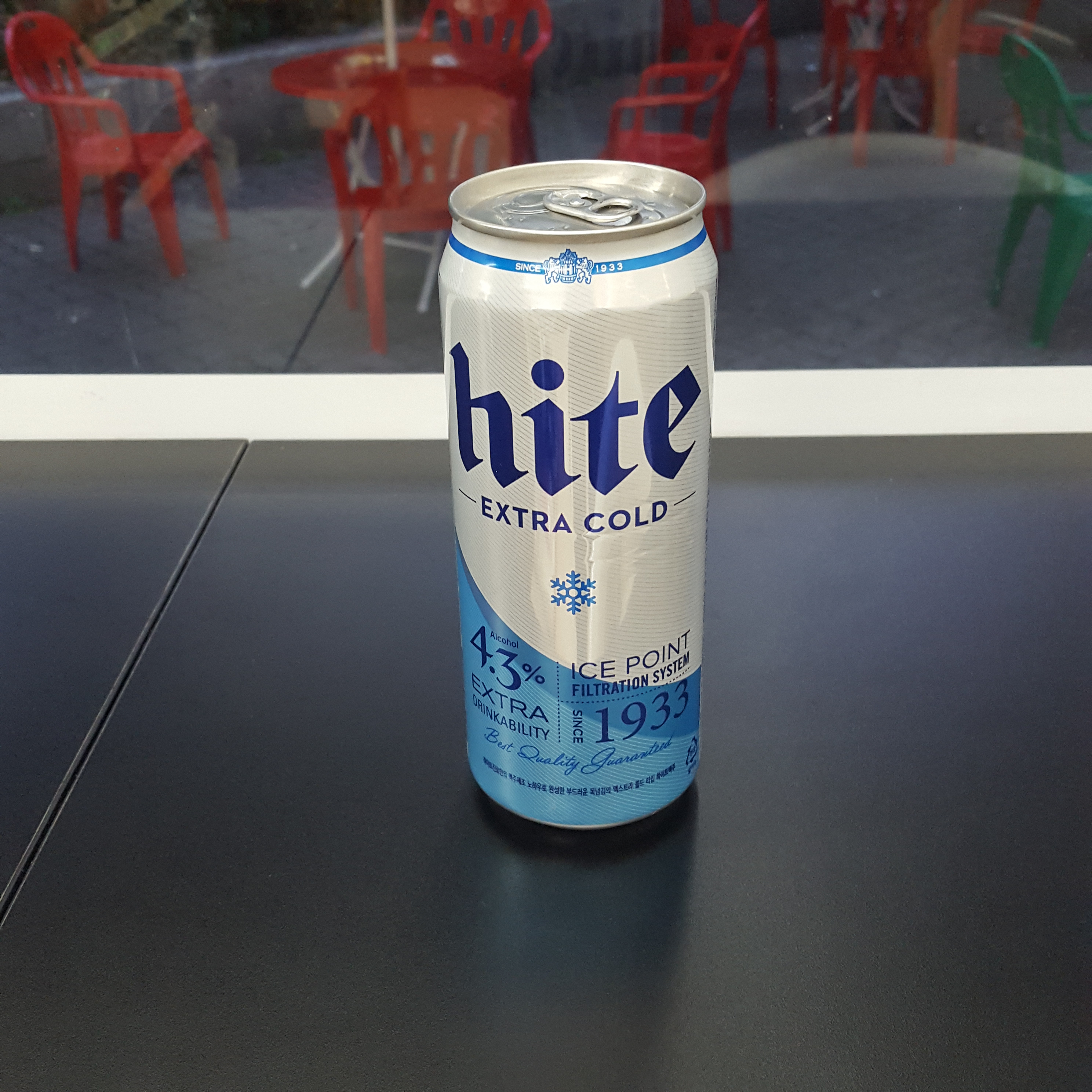
    Hite extra cold

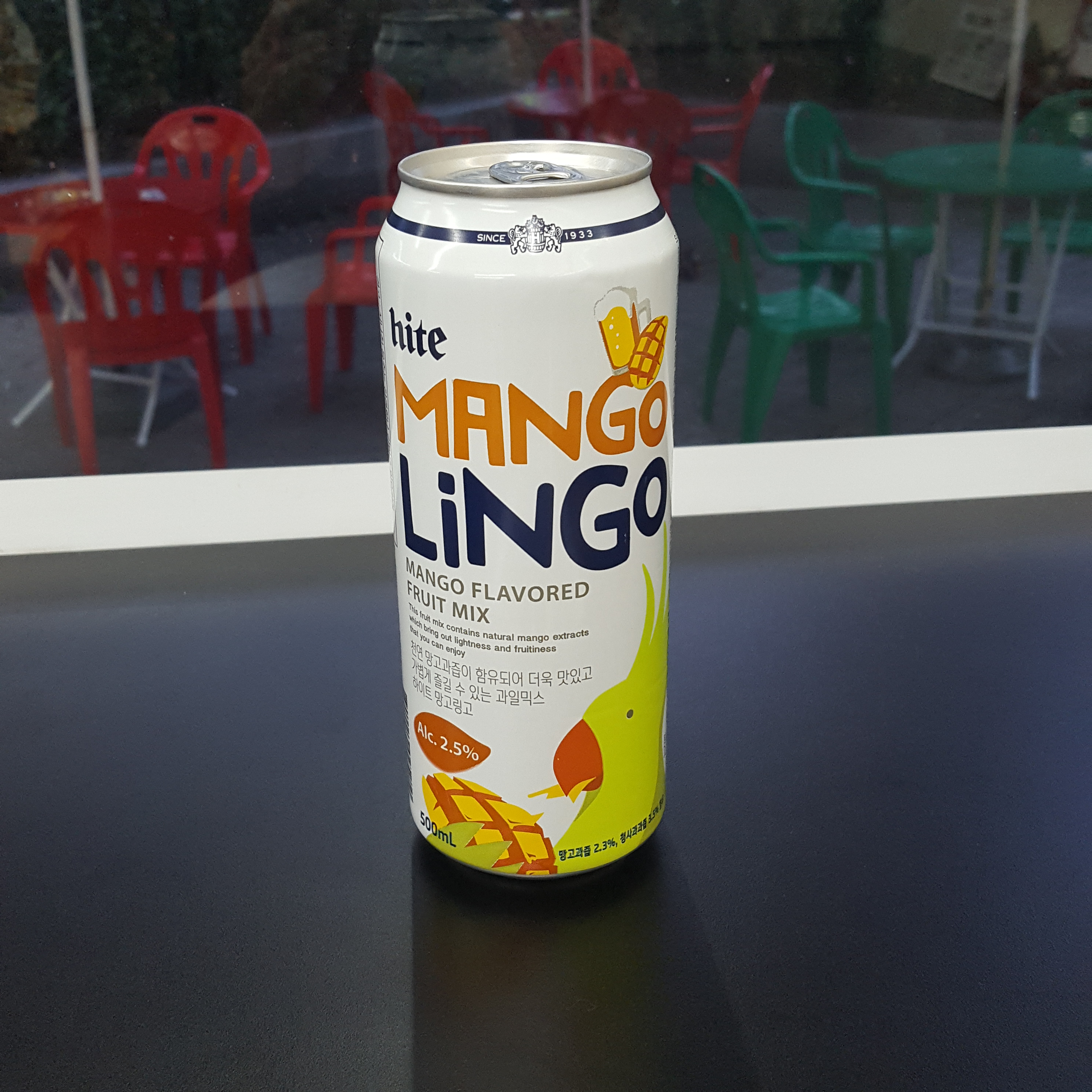
Mango Lingo

- Lotte Liquor
  - Kloud: An all-malt beer launched by Lotte Chilsung in 2014. It is made with over 50% German hops, and claims to use a "German original gravity brewing technique" where no water is added after fermentation. Kloud is 5% abv.
- Korea Craft Brewery
  - ARK: Available in Brown, Cony, and Classic. Brown and Classic are 4.3% abv with Cony being 4.5% abv.
- 7Bräu
  - The Emperor's beer: A top fermented IPA. Its name is a reference to 19th-century British imperialism. The Emperor's beer is 5.5% abv.
  - Original golden lager: A bottom fermented pilsner. Original golden lager is 5% abv.
  - Black Charisma: A top fermented stout. Black Charisma is 5% abv.
  - Glittering tenderness: A top fermented beer made from barley and wheat malt. Glittering tenderness is 4.2% abv.
  - Korean Pale Ale: A top fermented IPA with reduced bitterness (IBU). Korean Pale Ale is 4.6% abv.
  - Imperial I.P.A.: A high alcohol, top fermented mild-ale. It is produced with a large amount of hops and malt. Imperial I.P.A. is 7% abv.
  - Gompyo Wheat Beer: "Gompyo," famous for its flour in South Korea, has launched wheat beer with handmade beer maker 7Bräu, and Gompyo Wheat Beer is 4.5% abv.

== History of beer and beer market ==
Beer was first introduced to Korea in the early 20th century. Seoul's first beer brewery opened in 1908. The two current major breweries date back to the 1920s. The third brewery established in Korea, Jinro Coors Brewery, was founded in the 1990s but was later acquired by Oriental Breweries (OB).

In the past, Korean consumers had a preference for lagers versus ales or wheat beer; with the aforementioned flavors being rather unfamiliar. Recently, beer consumption has become more widespread. With the Free Trade Agreement (FTA) enacted, the importation of foreign beers tripled in 2015 compared with the previous year. The beer brand Paulaner topped sales in the first half of 2015, followed by Hoegaarden and Guinness. Recently, Korean society has shown an interest in drinking alcohol alone at home, with single-person households being the most common. This trend is depicted in the Korean TV drama Drinking Solo (Honsul).

Since 2014, the South Korean beer market has largely been dominated by OB and HiteJinro. Recently, Lotte Liquor has entered the beer market with Kloud, creating a three-way competition.

== Imported beer ==
Various foreign beer brands are available on the Korean market, with interest rapidly increasing. Major brands such as Hoegaarden, Heineken, and Budweiser rank high in the Korean beer market. Due to the cost of malt, Korean beer makers have largely turned to using corn, rice, and tapioca for manufacturing. Korean beer's malt rate is about 7%. Comparatively, German beer's malt rate is 100% with Japanese beer being 66%. With the signing of the Free Trade Agreement (FTA) between Europe and Korea in 2014, the import of foreign beers has drastically increased.

== Microbreweries ==
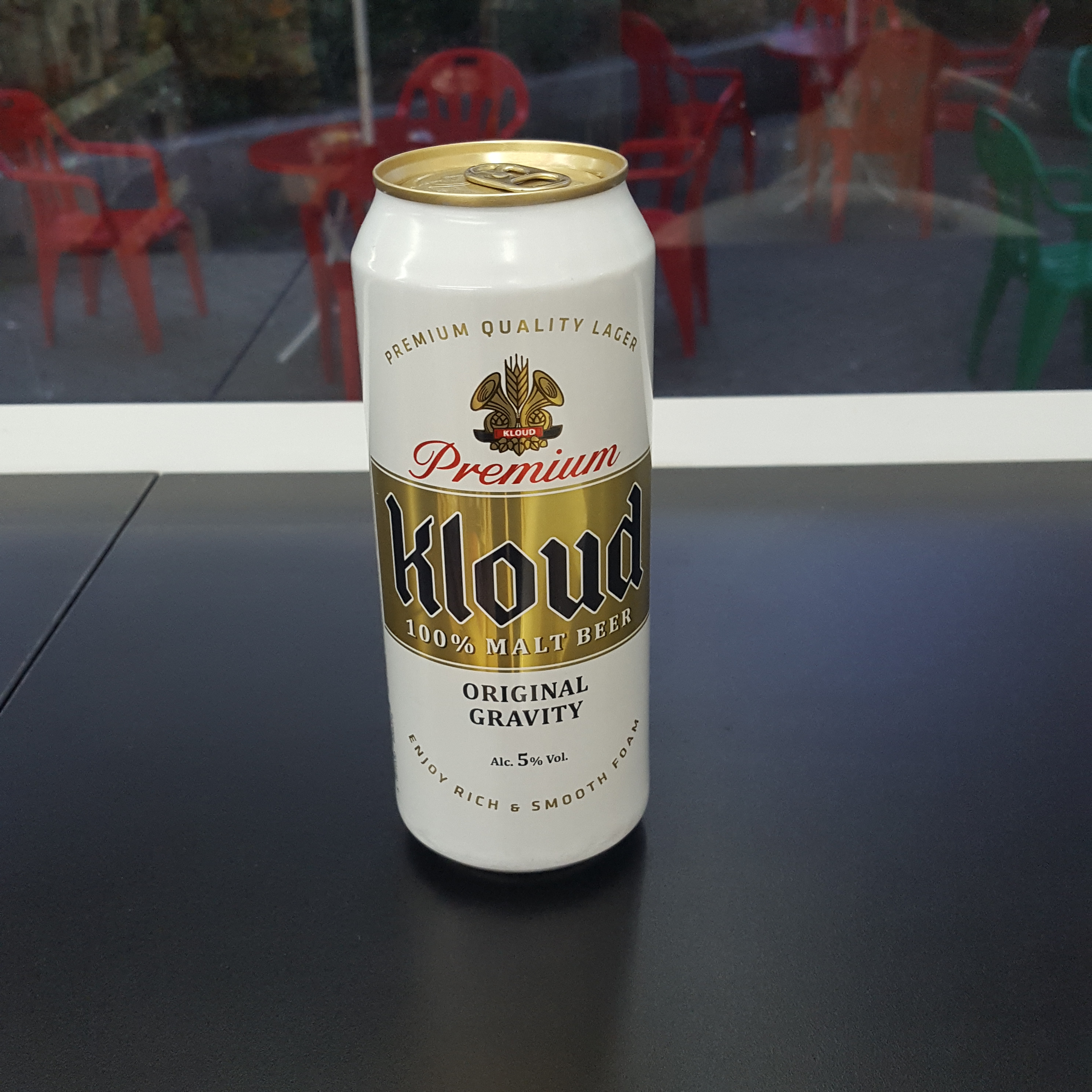
Kloud

After revision of the liquor tax law in South Korea in 2014, a new brewery license for making small scale beer has been introduced. Soon after this deregulation, craft beer scene has sprung up in South Korea. Microbreweries in South Korea have expanded the mass not only in domestic market, but also in overseas market. It has been increasing the demand and supply of microbreweries and pubs.

=== History ===
South Korean beer has a reputation for blandness and low quality. North Korean beer, in contrast, tends not to be as light and is considered relatively good for Asian beer. The British business weekly The Economist caused an uproar in South Korea when it declared in 2012 that "brewing remains just about the only useful activity at which North Korea beats the South." The article and the success of North Korean microbreweries prompted the South Korean beer industry to reform, including changing the alcohol law to allow microbrewing, in 2014.

=== List of microbreweries ===
- Praha 993: Czech Pub and Brewery located in Mangmi 2(i)-dong, Busan.
- Korea Craft Brewery: Located in Chungbuk. It has been ordered by Hitachino Nest.
- The Hand and Malt: Located in Namyangju. Owner of Korea's largest hops farm.
- Magpie Brewing Co.: Served on tap at three locations: Itaewon, Hongdae and Jeju.
- Galmegi Brewing Co.: American style brewery located in Seomyeon.
- The Booth: Located in Gyeongnidan. Began as a small pub in 2013. It produces 'Kukmin IPA', 'Dae-Dong Gang Pale Ale', 'Summer Zen Ale', 'Brewbro IPA' etc. It also serves a tap by 8 pubs in Seoul.
- Band of Brewers: pub and brewery in Seonreung.
- Gorilla Brewing: Located in Busan Gwangan-ri.
- Willow Brewery: Pub and brewery in Gangneung. It produces beers using hops cultivated by farmers in Gangneung.
- Stevens Brewing: Located in Sinsa-dong. It has been provided One-day class for making craft beer.
- SteinDorf-Bräu: Pub and brewery Located in Song-pa.
- Craftworks Taphouse: Brewpub in Namsan operational since 2013.
- Guarneri: Restaurant and pub located in Gangnam.
- AKITU Brewery: Brewery located in Busan.
- Wild Wave Brewing: Pub and brewery in Busan.
- Pyrus: Pub and Brewery in Itaewon.
- Pond Dang: Pub and Brewery in Garosu-gil.
- Play-ground Brewery: It has tap room in Ilsan, Songdo. And It has logo motivated from Korean traditional mask 'Haheo Tal'.
- Travier: Brewery in Ulsan.
- Whasoo Brewery: Pub and Brewery in Ulsan. It produces 'citron pale ale'
- Hidden Track: Brewery in Dongdae-moon.
- Saenghwal Beer: It has the most pubs in South Korea.
- Rami Brewing: Locally brewed beer, owned by Christopher Wing, James (Ilhae) Woo and Jae-man Lee.

== Beer festivals ==
- Great Korean Beer Festival: Held annually at Yongsan I-Park Mall Square in Seoul. There are many beers available both foreign and domestic. Many food options are also available.
- Chimaek Festival: Held in the city of Daegu. The festival is centered around Chimaek, the coupling of beer and fried chicken.

== Former products ==
- OB, OB Lager, OB Blue: Predecessors of OB Golden Lager.
- OB Super Dry.
- Crown, Crown Super Dry: Hite's (formerly Chosun Brewery) main product until the early 1990s.
- Hite Prime: Succeeded by Max.
- Hite Exfeel: Succeeded by S.
- ARK: The first craft beer by Korea Craft Brewery.

== Statistics ==
Beer Supplied in Korea (2011)
	Local Products	Imported Products	Total
Value; Billion Won (KRW)	3,800 (93.8%)	250 (6.2%)	4,049
Volume (Kiloliter)	1,738,759 (96.7%)	58,993 (3.3%)	1,797,752

Importation of Beer in Korea (2012)
Country	Value (Million dollar)	Share (%)
Japan	26.4	n/a
Netherlands	9.9	n/a
United States	6.5	n/a
Ireland	6.5	n/a
China	n/a	n/a
Germany	5.8	n/a
Mexico	n/a	n/a
Belgium	2.1	n/a

Market Sales Between Domestic and Imported Beer (2016)
Year	Domestic Beer Sales (Billion Won)	Imported Beer
2013	2110	300
2014	2140	360
2015	2165	500
2016 (estimated)	2190	620

== Criticism ==
In 2012 The Economist magazine published an article criticizing South Korean beers to be as boring or worse than North Korea's Taedonggang Beer. The magazine claimed some South Korean beers skimp on barley malt, using corn and rice instead. The article further described the problem as a result of the national market being a cramped duopoly (Hite-Jinro and Oriental Brewery) that prevented microbreweries from entering the market. South Korean beer companies denied the allegations, one specifically saying that "most (South) Korean beers contain more than 70 percent malt, and some including Hite Max of Hite and OB Golden Lager of OB contain 100 percent malt. Rice and corn are not cheaper than malt, and these grains are used in the mixture to generate a mild taste." Despite the negative reactions from the South Korean breweries, many local beer drinkers are still dissatisfied with the taste of local beer brands.

== See also ==
- Beer and breweries by region
- Beer in North Korea
- Korean alcoholic beverages
- Korean cuisine
- Somaek
