= Beer in Korea =

Beer in Korea may refer to:

- Beer in North Korea
- Beer in South Korea
