= De Proefbrouwerij =

Flemish brewery

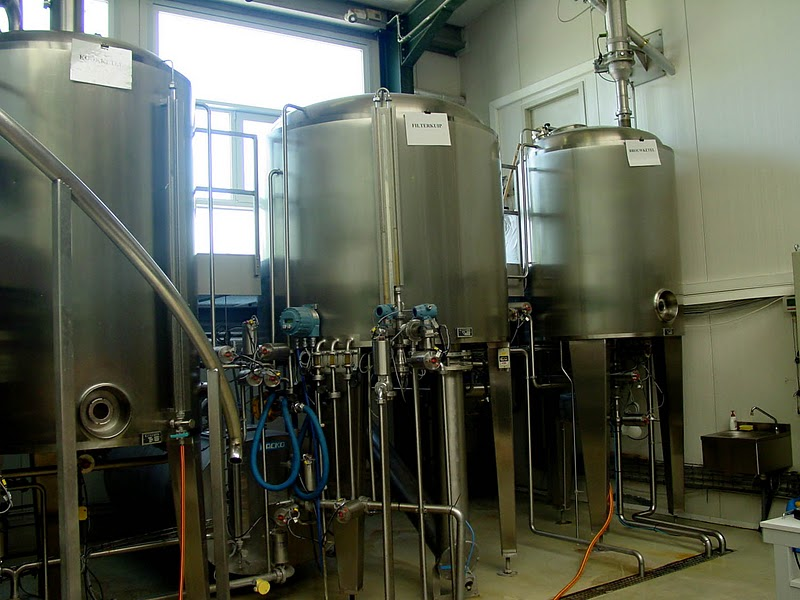
- Interactive map of De Proefbrouwerij
- Location: Lochristi; Belgium
- Opened: 1996
- Owner: Dirk Naudt and Saskia Waerniers

Active beers
Name	Type
Reinaert Amber 7°	Dubbel
Reinaert Grand Cru 9,5°	Barley wine
Reinaert Tripel 9°	Tripel

De Proefbrouwerij is a Flemish brewery founded in 1996 by Dirk Naudts and his wife Saskia Waerniers. The brewery is located in the village of Lochristi, near Ghent. They operate as a rental brewery, creating beers for third party brewers, as well as producing their own beers. They also operate a research and development department focused on the science of brewing.

== De Proef Beers ==
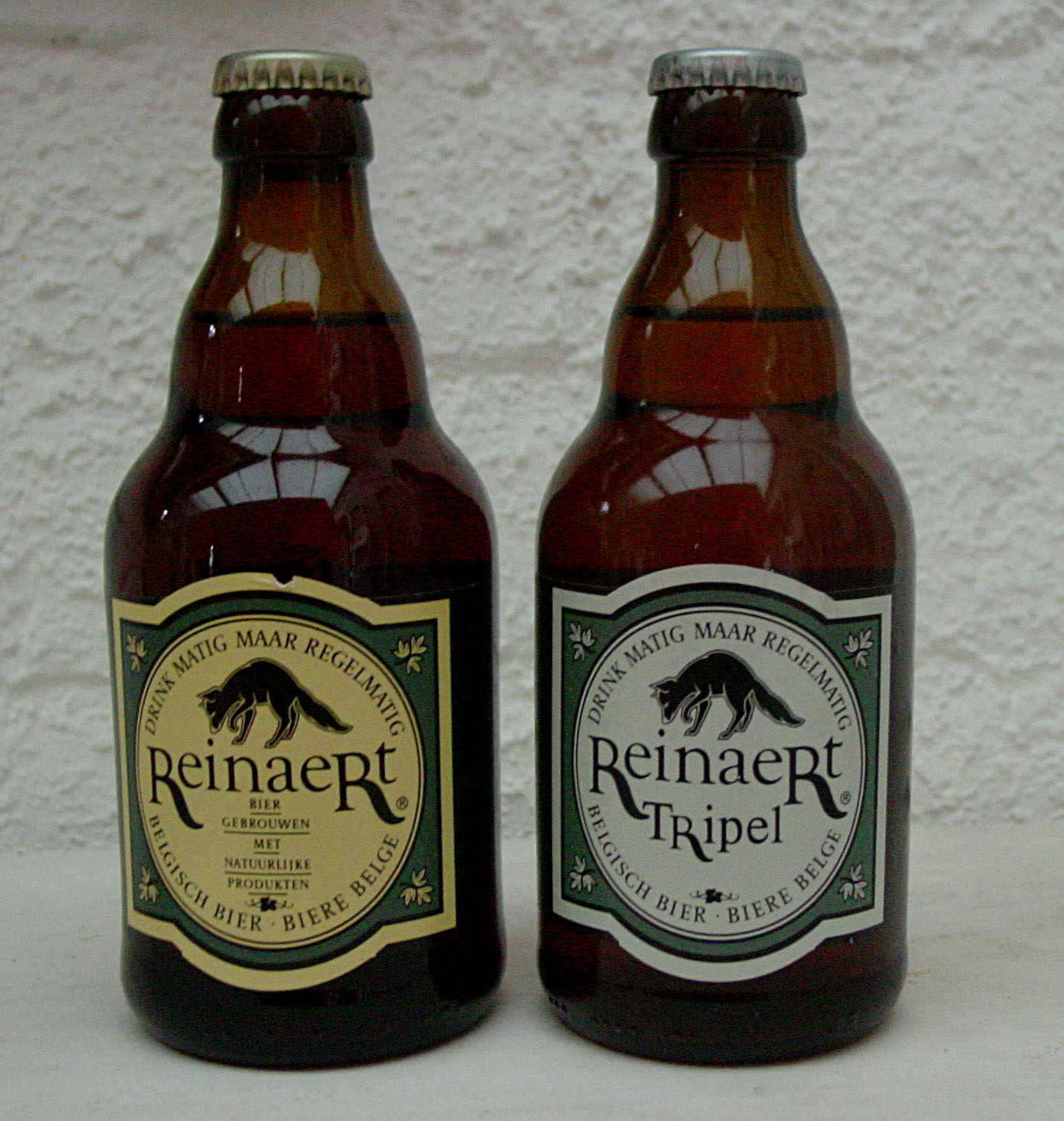
Reinaert Amber and Tripel

The brewery releases its own brand of beers under the moniker "Reinaert", these include: a flemish red ale (9%), an amber beer (7%), a tripel (9%), and a grand cru (9.5%).

== Gypsy Brewers ==
The brewery operates predominantly as a rental brewery, and provide the brewing facilities to many gypsy breweries who do not have their own facilities, or who want to produce experimental small batch beers.

=== Notable Breweries Using De Proef ===
- Bell's (USA)
- Surly (USA)
- Mikkeller (Denmark)
- The Musketeers (Belgium)
- To Øl (Denmark)
- Prearis (Belgium)
- Bieren Van Begeerte (Belgium)
- Green's (Belgium)
- Duits & Lauret (the Netherlands)
- Amazing Brewing Co. (South Korea)
- The Booth Brewing Co. (South Korea)
- Magpie Brewing Co. (South Korea)
- Omnipollo (Sweden)
- Brulandselva (Norway)
- Lowlander Botanical Beers (The Netherlands)
- Beavertown Brewery (United Kingdom)
