= Bloemenbier =

Belgian beer brand

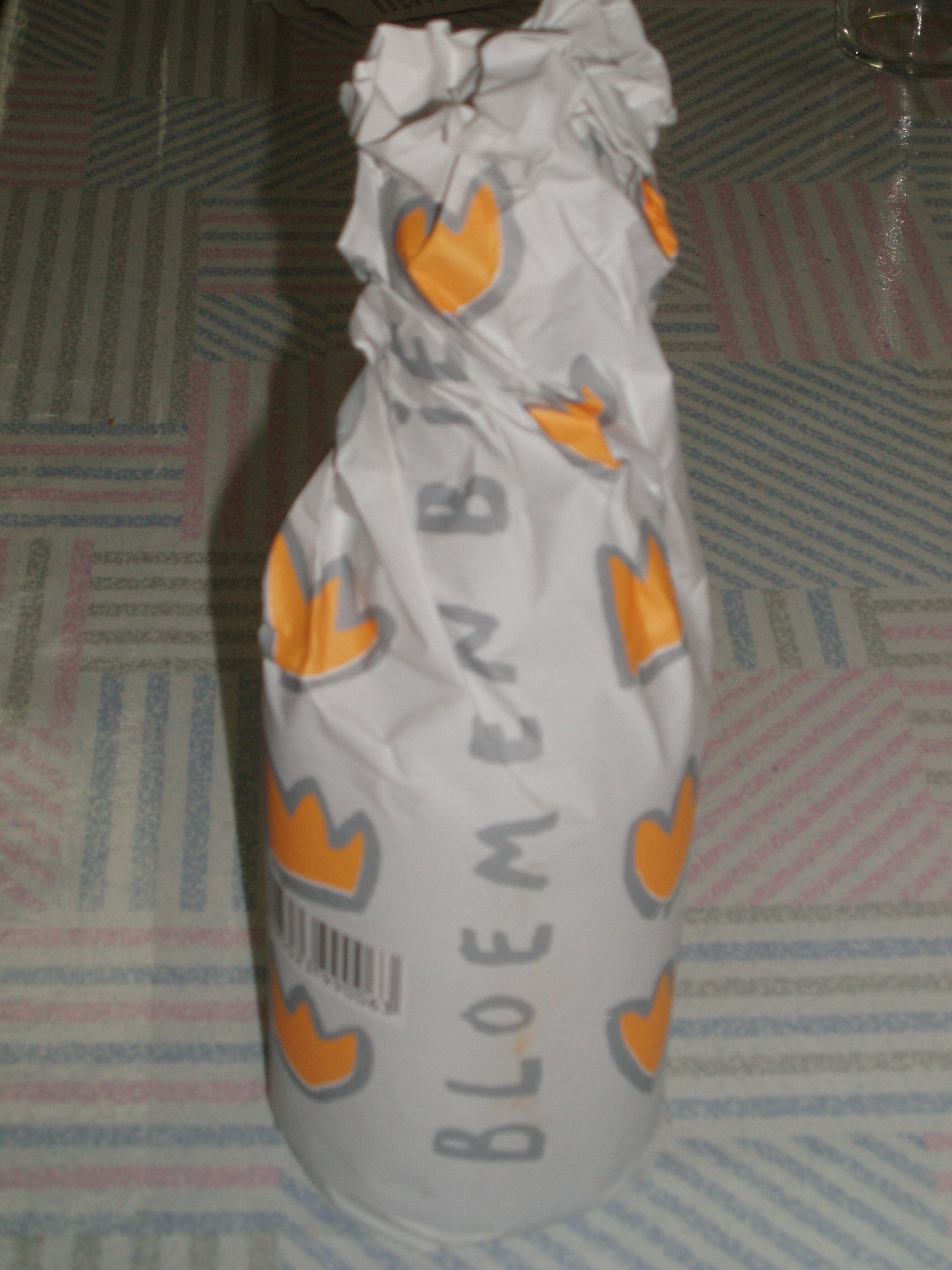
- Bloemenbier
- Type: Belgian Amber Beer
- Manufacturer: De Proefbrouwerij
- Country of origin: Belgium
- Alcohol by volume: 7%
- Colour: Amber
- Flavour: Flowers

Bloemenbier is a Belgian beer brewed with flowers. It is also notably sold in a paper-wrapped bottle.

The beer is brewed by De Proefbrouwerij in a small Belgian town in Lochristi, famous for its flowers. Bloemenbier is amber with an alcohol content of 7%. Flowers are used in the fermentation process.

== See also ==
- Beer in Belgium
