= Beer in North Korea =

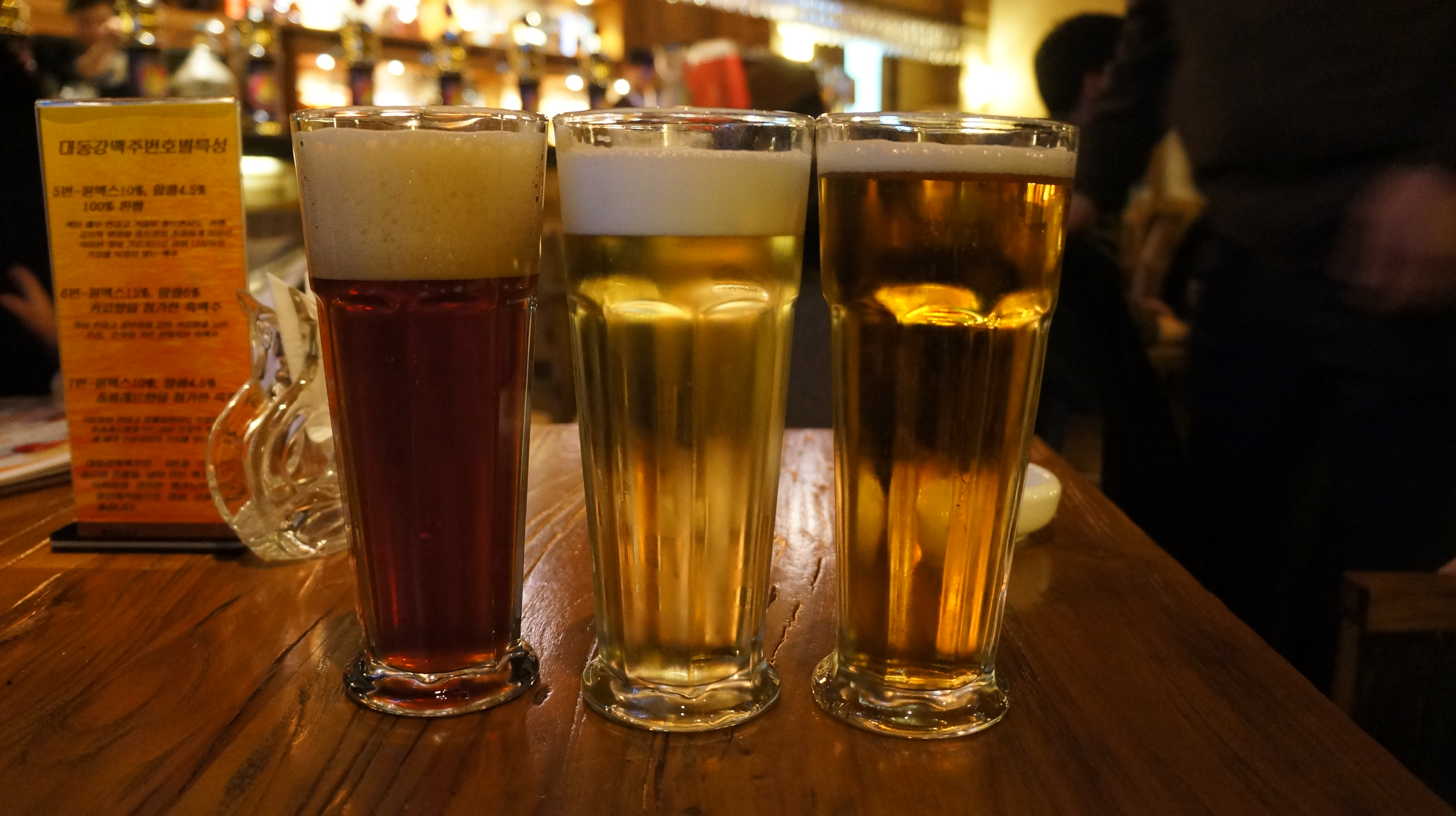
- Craft beer at the Taedonggang Microbrewery No. 3 in Pyongyang

Korean name
- Hangul: 맥주
- Hanja: 麥酒
- RR: maekju
- MR: maekchu
- IPA: mɛk̚.t͈ɕu

North Korea has at least ten major breweries and many microbreweries that supply a wide range of beer products. The top brand is the light lager Taedonggang by the state-owned Taedonggang Brewing Company.

The country's problems with goods distribution and power output have forced North Korean brewers to innovate. To minimize distribution, many restaurants and hotels maintain their own microbreweries. Because an unreliable power supply makes it difficult to refrigerate beer, North Koreans have developed their own steam beer, an originally American beer style brewed in higher than normal temperatures, that is widely available.

Although the Korean liquor soju is preferred, beer comes second when it comes to consumption. Since the 1980s, beer has been within reach of ordinary North Koreans, though it is still rationed. Tourists, on the other hand, enjoy inexpensive beer without such limitations.

== History ==
The Japanese brought beer to Colonial Korea in the 1930s in the form of German lager beers. After World War II and independence, until at least 1960, all beer in North Korea was produced domestically. By the 1980s, beer was in such wide availability that most North Koreans could drink it. Until the mid-1990s when the state rationing system started to crumble, North Koreans would receive one bottle of Korean liquor soju and three bottles of beer for every major public holiday in North Korea. All North Korean beers are bottled in domestic made glass bottles. During the North Korean famine, beer bottles were used for intravenous therapy (IV) due to the shortage of proper hospital equipment.

Although there had been breweries before, brewing in North Korea began in earnest in 2000, when the country's leader Kim Jong Il wanted to build a showcase brewery in the country. The state-owned Taedonggang Brewing Company purchased the old brewery of Ushers of Trowbridge in the United Kingdom and imported it to North Korea. In April 2002 the Taedonggang Beer Factory opened in the capital Pyongyang. The Rakwon Paradise Microbrewery and the Yanggakdo Hotel Microbrewery soon followed.

On 12 August 2016, the Taedonggang brewery opened the first beer festival in the country. The festival was cancelled for 2017, possibly due to drought.

Until recent economic difficulties, there were government-run beer halls in Pyongyang and other major cities. As of 2007, beer was generally available in private restaurants that became more common when government control on the economy was loosened.

== Beer culture ==
North Korea has a lively beer brewing culture in spite of the country's isolation.

Beer is not the most popular alcoholic beverage among North Koreans, who generally prefer the Korean liquor soju. Consequently, North Korean beer is little known. Nevertheless, beer and soju are the two most common alcoholic drinks in the country, with 94.9 per cent of all alcohol consumed (in pure alcohol) being liquor and the remaining 5.1 per cent beer. An average North Korean consumes just under a litre of pure alcohol in the form of beer annually. Nevertheless, North Koreans are said to "love a beer as much as Europeans or North Americans". According to Josh Thomas, an amateur brewer who has toured North Korean breweries:

"[T]he average Pyongyang man [drinks] beer fairly frequently — at least once a week. People in the countryside drink less often, and some never at all. Beer culture is still developing; it is mainly men going to a bar after work, drinking a couple of beers."

In the future, beer drinking is expected to trend among young people in particular. North Korean youths have begun to emulate their South Korean counterparts, for whom beer and folk music were a youth trend in the 1970s.

== Availability ==
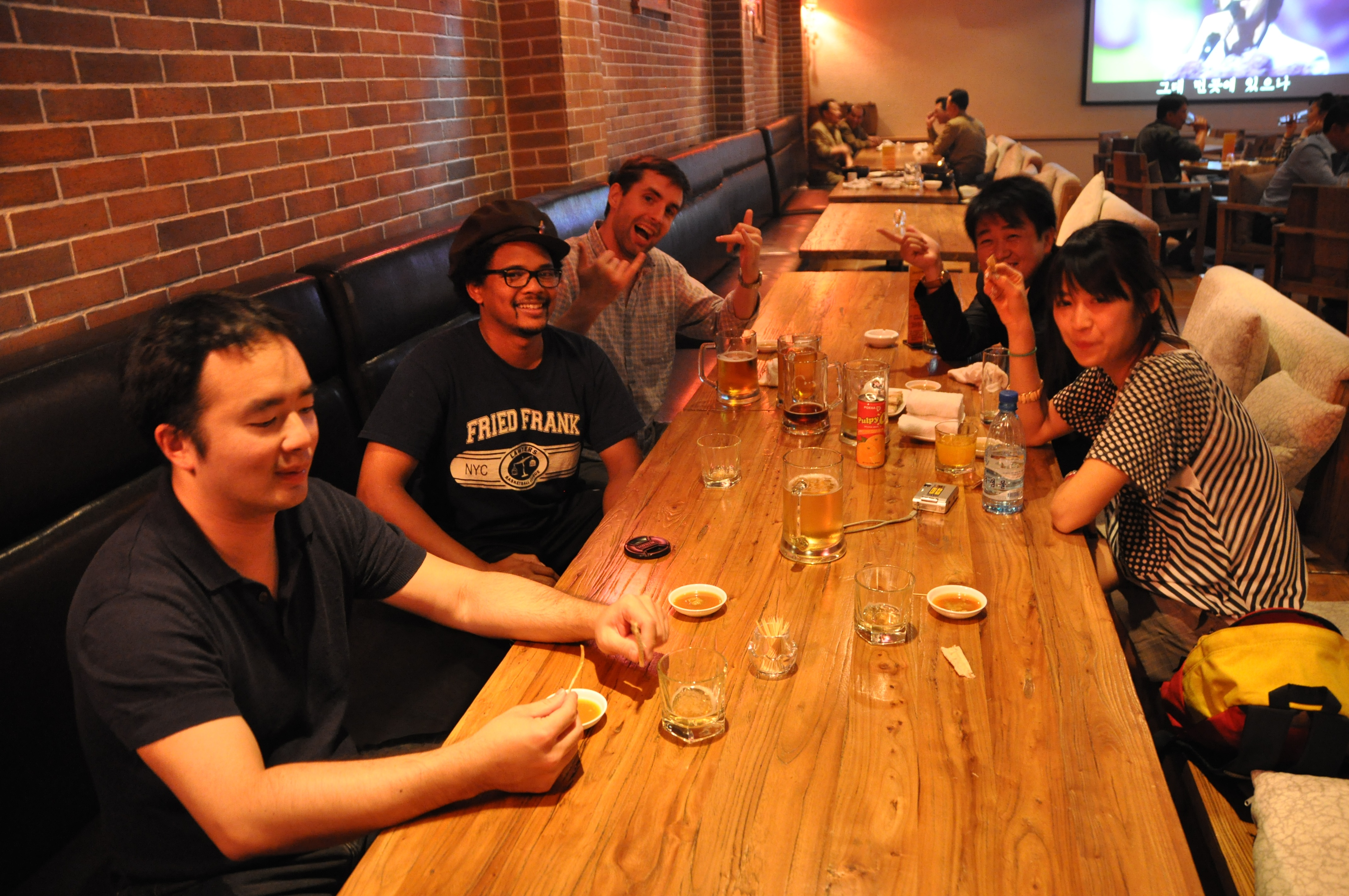
A group of tourists at the Taedonggang Microbrewery No. 3 in Pyongyang. Beer is available to tourists without limitation.

Mass-produced beer can be found everywhere in the country, and microbreweries are also common.

North Koreans need to expend food coupons when buying beer, which will diminish their grain rations. North Korean men residing in Pyongyang can receive beer vouchers that entitle them to one or two monthly liters of beer at low-end bars. These limitations make beer a beverage primarily for the elite. It is not uncommon for donju, the nouveau riche of Pyongyang, to frequent beer houses. According to the KCNA, there are some 300 newly installed beer taps in Pyongyang, consistent with plans to open 300 pubs announced earlier. There is a "huge number" of bars in Pyongyang where beer is available. In the summer and during festivals, beer tents pop up around Pyongyang.

Tourists can buy beer with foreign currency without the limitations that apply to North Koreans. A beer in international hotels cost about two euros. Although for tourists, according to Josh Thomas, the actual "price of drinking North Korean beer is bowing to a lot of statues of Kim Il-Sung and Kim Jong-Il, listening to their version of the Korean war, and eating anything and everything they give you to eat".

In farmers' markets, a bottle of beer costs about 53 North Korean won. Foreign beers such as Heineken, Tiger, Erdinger and Bavarian are increasingly available. A can of Chinese beer, such as Tsingtao or Harbin, can cost up to 4,000 won on the Jangmadang (grey market). Poor rural people brew their own beer with whatever ingredients they can find; "We found corn flower and hops and made something that came out a weird milky color. At least it was fizzy like beer", one North Korean defector remembers.

== Brands ==
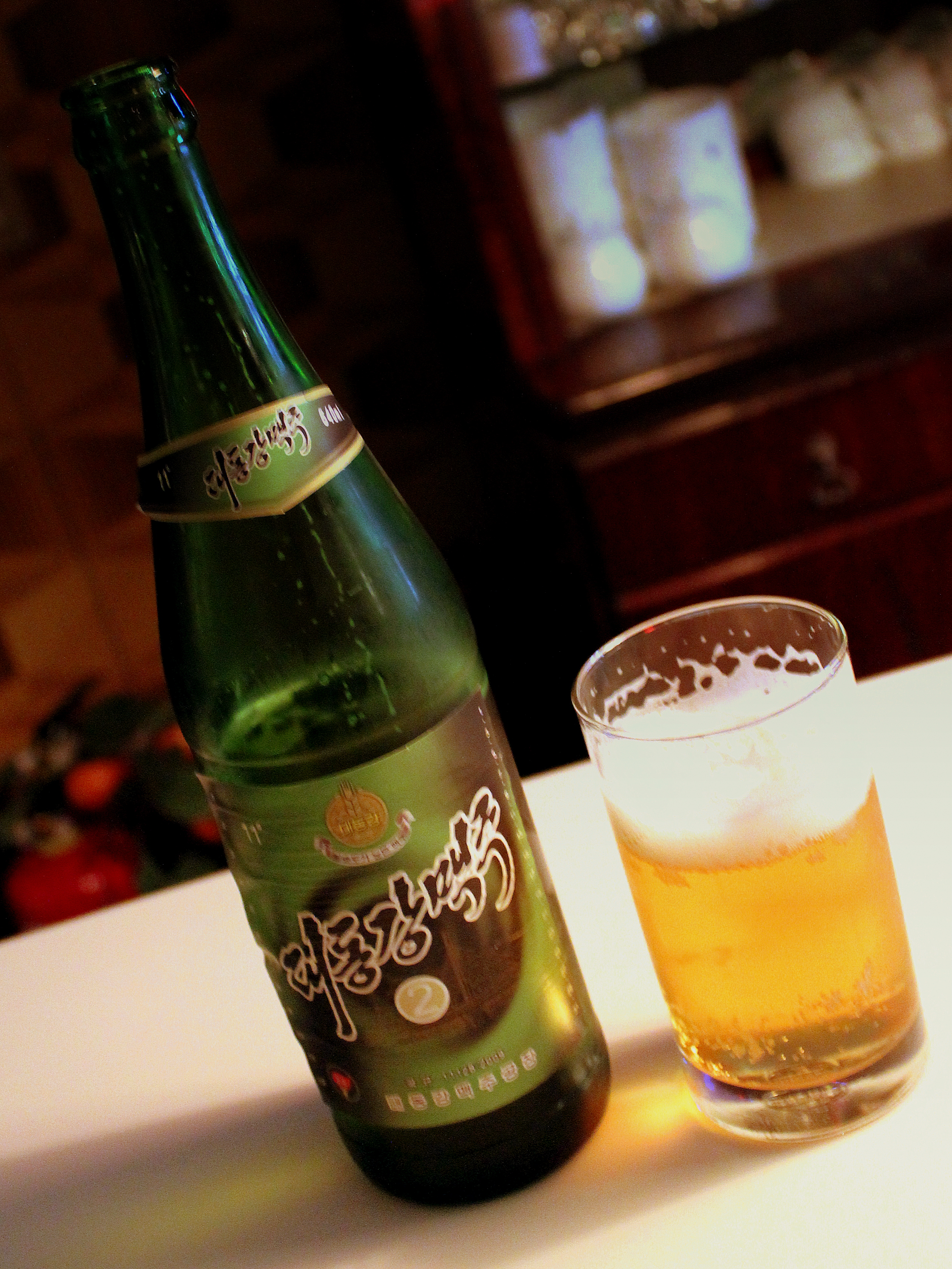
Taedonggang is the top beer brand of North Korea.

There are at least ten breweries in North Korea. The country has more major breweries than South Korea. Breweries include the Paradise Microbrewery, the Yanggakdo Hotel Microbrewery (of the Yanggakdo International Hotel), and the Taedonggang National Brewery. Several different beers are brewed in the country, "ranging from steam beers, to oatmeal stouts, to chocolate porters and pale ales". According to Josh Thomas, "[f]or a country that commonly experiences famines, North Korea has a surprisingly large range of beers."

Taedonggang, "Taedong River", a golden orange lager, is the top brand. It is considered one of the best quality beers in all of Korea, or even "significantly better" than all other mass-market beers in the rest of Asia. Taedonggang has been exported, even to South Korea, from 2005 until 2007 when Pyongyang increased its price. Other brands include Ryongsong, Pyongyang, Pohak, Ponghak, Rakwon ("Paradise") and Samgak ("Delta").

=== Microbreweries ===
There are many microbreweries in the country. The "surprising microbrewery culture" can be explained with regard to sanctions against North Korea that limit the availability of petrol, thus making distribution of beer a particularly difficult part of the product lifecycle:

"[I]t is a country of microbreweries. The hotel makes its own beer. The bowling alley makes its own beer. The restaurants make their own beer. The national Taedonggang beer was certainly available throughout the entire country, but in any location with sufficient space for a microbrewery, they seemed to build one in order to offset any supply chain inefficiencies."

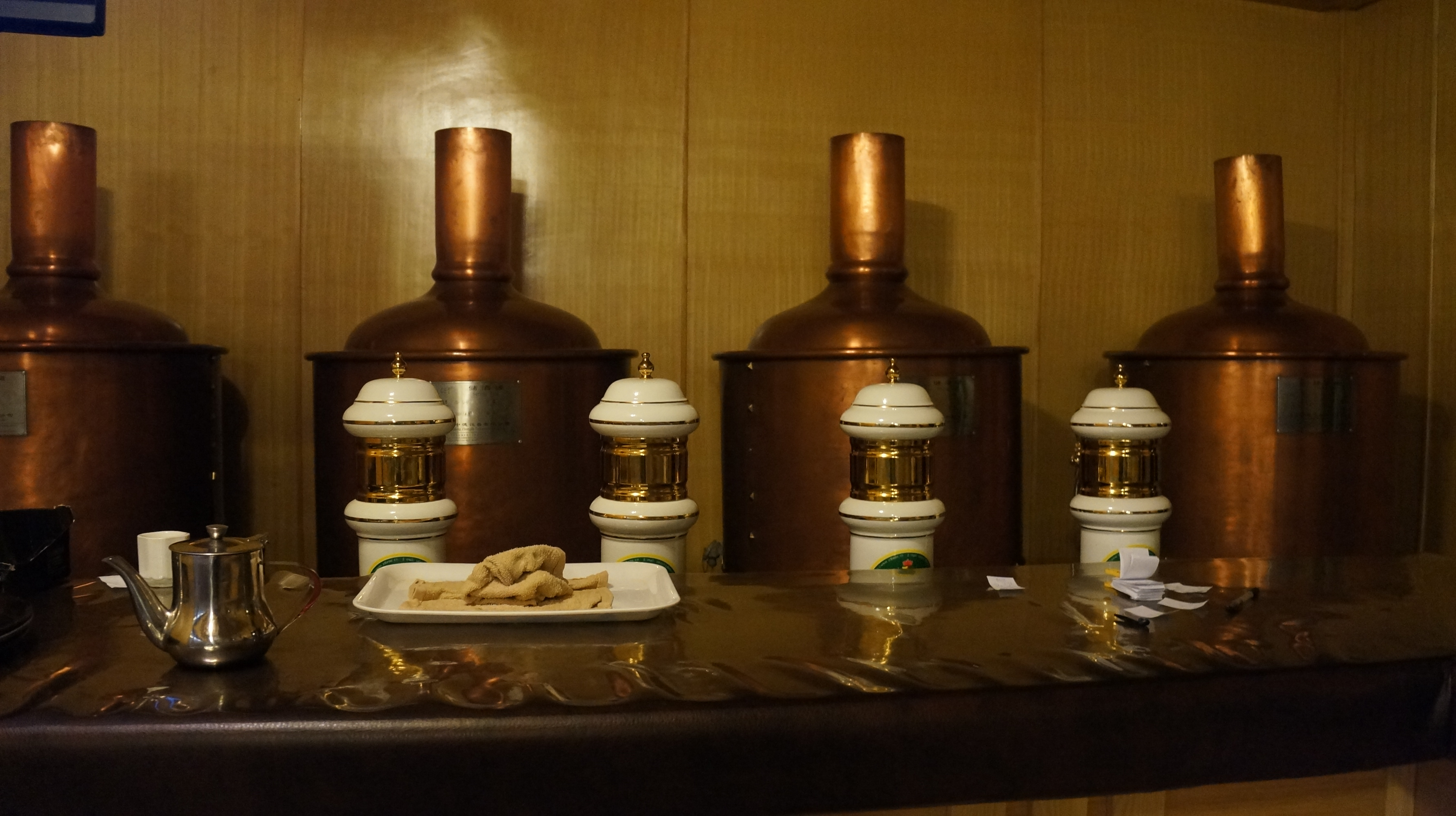
Rakwon Paradise Microbrewery in Pyongyang is one of the many microbreweries of North Korea.

Many bars and hotels brew their own beer. The Koryo Hotel, for instance, houses a microbrewery that serves what is considered "the best dark beer in town". There is also a microbrewery at the Chongjin Tourist Hotel in Chongjin. A microbrewery with Czech-made equipment exists in the Rason Special Economic Zone. Only the Taedonggang Brewing Company could be classified as a "macro" brewery and the rest are, in effect, microbreweries.

=== Steam beer ===
There is a North Korean variety of steam beer, an originally American-style of beer brewed in higher than normal temperatures. The North Korean equivalent came about through necessity, as frequent power outages made it impossible to maintain a constant low temperature for brewing. North Korean steam beers are brewed with lager yeast, but for the same reason of unreliable refrigeration, ales are also well-liked. North Korean steam beers are so ubiquitous that it can be said that "the average beer is a steam beer". Since rice—a staple in Asian beer—is reserved for food, and barley is not generally used in Korean cooking, there is ample barley to be used in brewing, up to the point of all-barley beers. As a result, beers are darker, fuller and maltier, which is considered a perk over other Asian beers. Necessities have forced North Koreans to make, according to one writer, "more interesting beers than most other countries of the world".

== Quality ==
North Korean beers have low hop content due to taste preferences. North Korean breweries have an abundance of fresh water, and due to the underdevelopment of North Korea's industries, the water used is largely free of pollutants and impurities. Other ingredients are imported.

North Korean beer, in general, is "relatively good", and tends not to be as light as its South Korean counterparts, whose reputation is of blandness and low quality. The British business weekly The Economist caused an uproar in South Korea when it declared in 2012 that "brewing remains just about the only useful activity at which North Korea beats the South." The article and the success of North Korean microbreweries prompted the South Korean beer industry to reform, including changing the alcohol law to allow microbrewing.

== See also ==
- Beer and breweries by region
- Beer in South Korea
- Drinking culture of Korea
- Energy in North Korea
- Korean alcoholic beverages
- Korean cuisine
- Poktan-ju
- Smoking in North Korea
- Somaek
- Tourism in North Korea
