= SNAB =

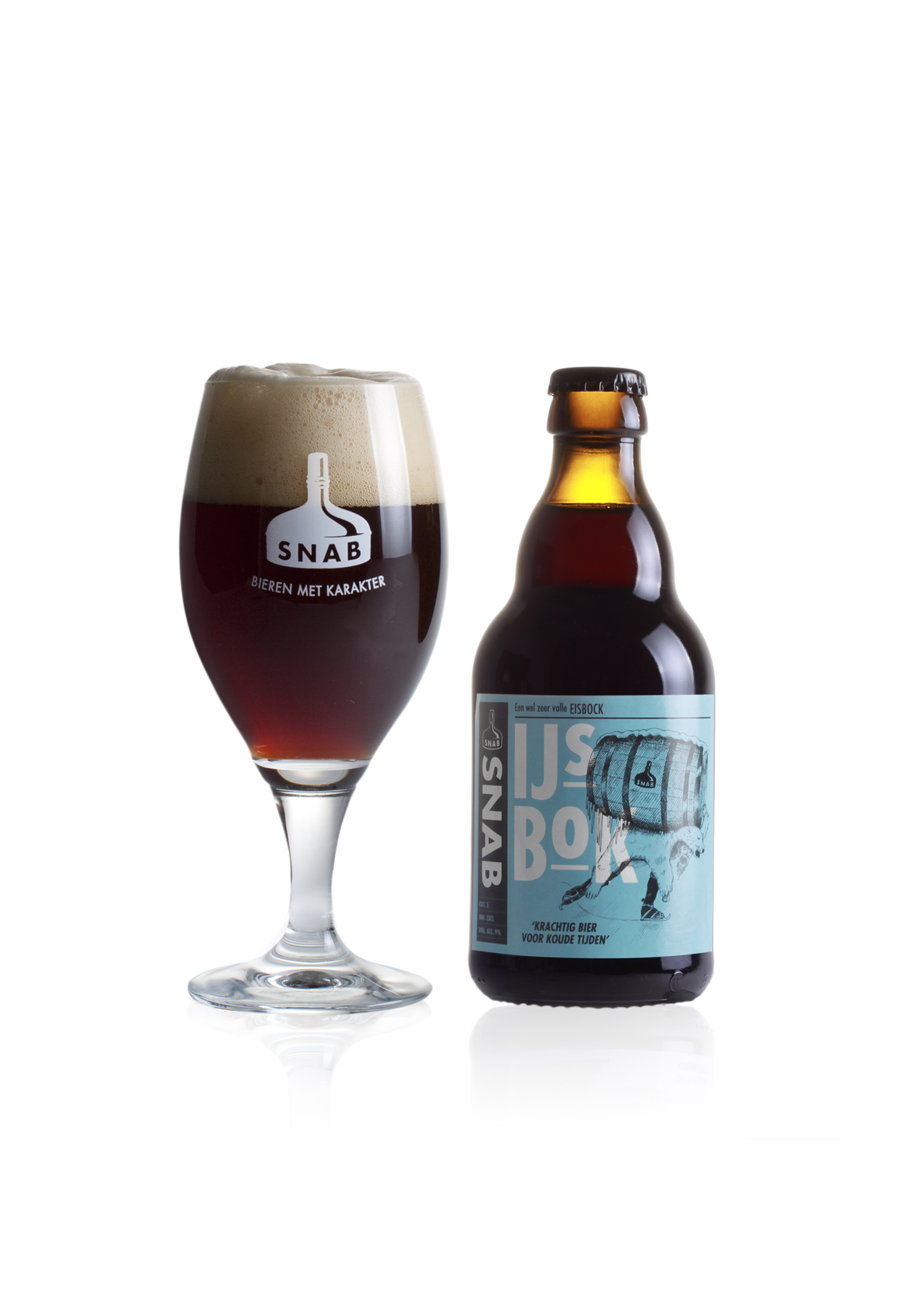
IJsbok, a beer that has won many awards for SNAB.

SNAB (an acronym in Dutch: Stichting Noordhollandse Alternatieve Bierbrouwers, North Holland Alternative Beer Brewer's Foundation) is a Dutch organisation dedicated to promoting alternative beer and beer culture in the Netherlands, from Purmerend, North Holland.

== Overview ==
SNAB was founded on 24 January 1991 to promote what they term alternative beers and beer culture. They explain this as meaning beers which are brewed either with unusual ingredients or by unusual methods. In order to achieve this they work to develop and commercialise types of beer which are relatively unknown in the Netherlands. Specifically, the SNAB lists its goals as:

- The reintroduction of older types of beer which have faded from popularity and the introduction of types of beer which have not previously been brewed in the Netherlands.
- The brewing of beers with their own recognisable taste, with the emphasis on adventurous flavours and taste sensations.
- Pushing the boundaries of brewing through the use of natural, unconventional ingredients and also combining classic styles to create new, alternative beers.

SNAB does not operate its own commercial scale brewery. Instead, recipes are developed using the foundation's own micro brewery but the beers are brewed on a commercial scale under license by the Proefbrouwerij in Lochristie, Belgium.

== Products ==
Beers produced by SNAB are:

=== Beers produced all year round ===
Name	Style	First brewed	ABV	Notes
X-Porter	Brown porter	1994	4.5%	
Koning Honing	Honey beer	1998	7.5%	Brewed with honey. Gold award, European Beer Star, 2007.
SNAB Pale Ale	American pale ale	2000	6.3%	
Maelstrøm	American barleywine	2001	9.8%	
Czaar Peter	Russian imperial stout	2002	8.5%	
Otter SB	Extra special bitter	2008	5.6%	

=== Seasonal beers ===
Seasonal beers include:

Name	Style	First brewed	ABV	Notes
Speculator	Christmas/Winter specialty spiced beer	1996	9.9%	Winter beer, produced from November.
Ezelenbok	Doppelbock	1998	7.5%	Autumn beer, produced from October. Winner of the Best Dutch Bokbeer award 2001, 2002 and 2005.
IJsbok	Eisbock	1998	9.0%	Autumn beer, produced from October. Silver award winner, World Beer Cup, 2006. Best Dutch Bokbeer, 2007. Best Strong Dutch Bokbeer, 2008.
