= Taedonggang Brewing Company =

North Korean brewing company

Coordinates: 38°59′41″N 125°48′25″E

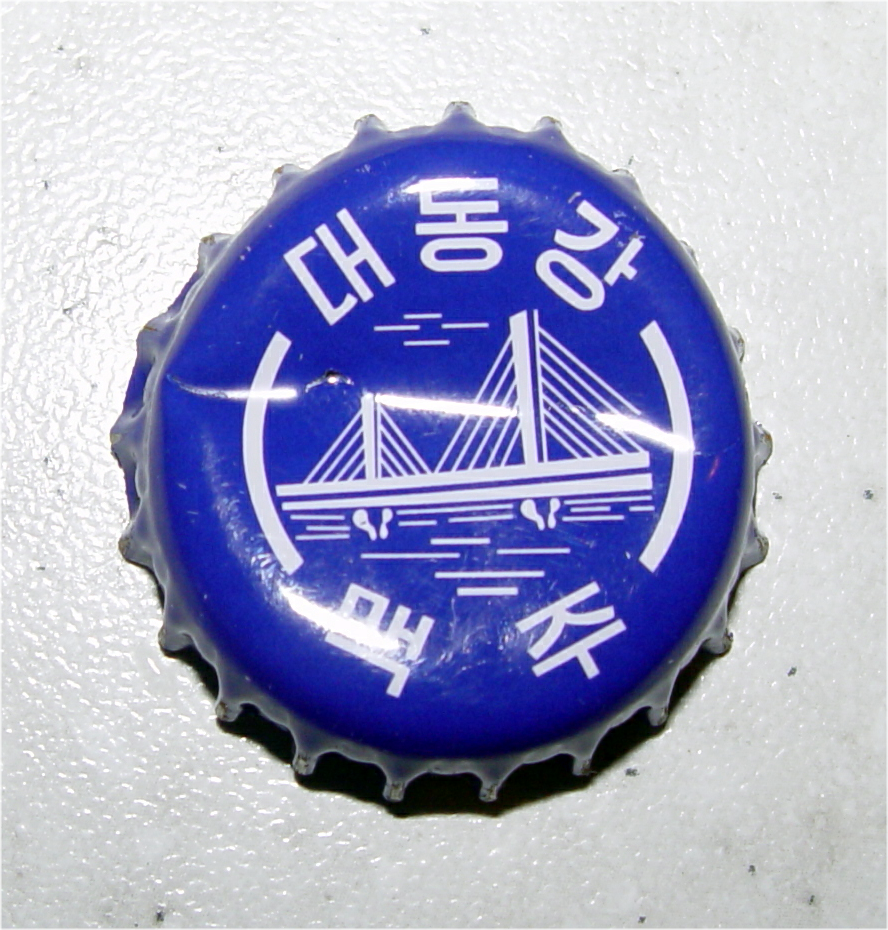
A Taedonggang bottle cap

The Taedonggang Brewing Company (Korean: 대동강맥주공장) is a state-owned North Korean beer brewery company that brews the Taedonggang beer. The brewery is located in East Pyongyang and has facilities of tens of thousands of square meters.

== History ==
In 2000, Kim Jong-il decided the country needed a showcase brewery. At that point having good relationships with the West, via connections to Germany the Government of North Korea bought the intact and still in place brewery plant of the closed Ushers of Trowbridge, Wiltshire, England for £1.5M via broker Uwe Oehms. Concerned it could be used for chemical weapons production, after assurances, Peter Ward, of brewing company Thomas Hardy Brewing and Packaging bought the plant, and arranged for a team from North Korea to travel to Trowbridge to dismantle it. Groundbreaking of the Taedonggang Beer Factory took place on 15 January 2000. Reinstalled and operational from 2002, the brewery uses German-made computerized brewing control technology. The brewery is located in the Sadong District of Pyongyang.

Taedonggang beer is named after the Taedong River, which runs through the center of Pyongyang. The Chongryu Bridge is featured on the bottle cap.

On July 3, 2009, a commercial for the product was broadcast on state-run Korean Central Television. This is a rare move, as there are very few advertisements on North Korean television. It has been broadcast three times in all.

== Products ==
The Taedonggang Brewing Company is mostly known outside the DPRK as the producer of the beer known as Taedonggang beer, which is the flagship beer of the companies. In addition, the brewery also produces a brand of draught, a brand of black beer and a rice beer.

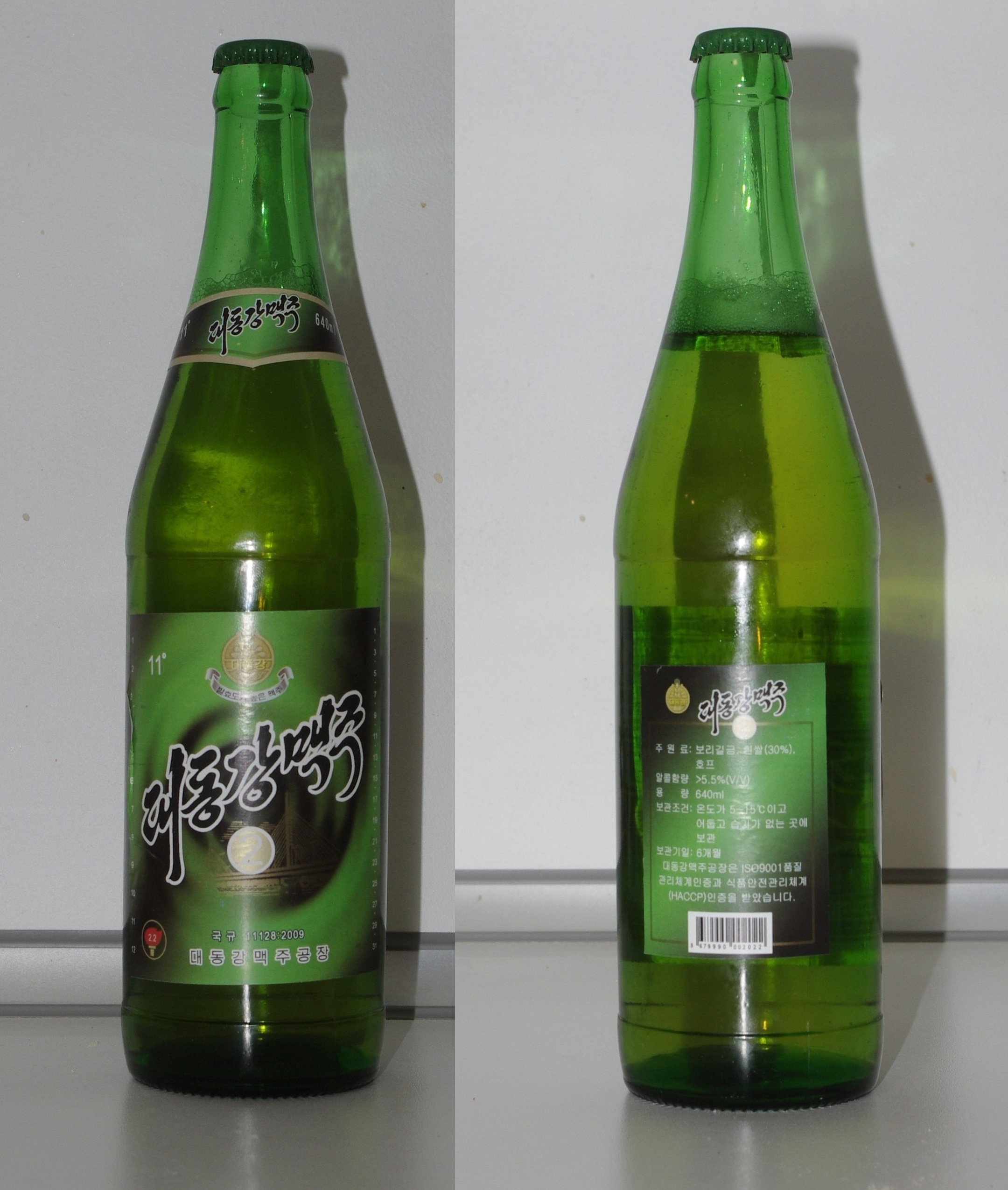
640 ml Taedonggang No.2

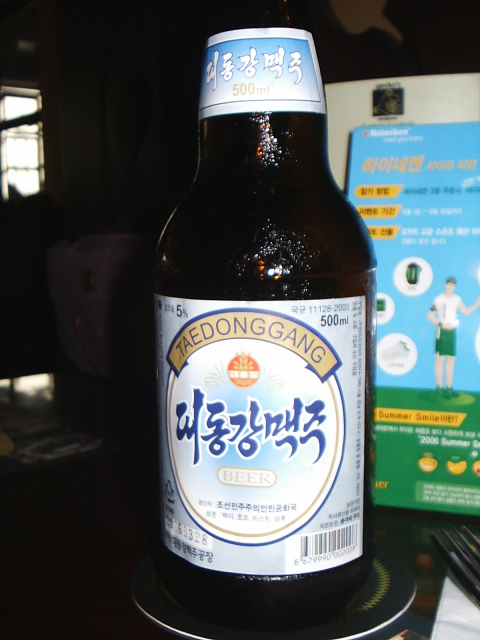
500 ml Taedonggang

== See also ==
- Beer in North Korea
- Korean cuisine
- Pyongyang Ostrich Farm
