= Taedonggang =

North Korean beer

- Type: Lager
- Manufacturer: Taedonggang Brewing Company
- Origin: North Korea
- Introduced: 2002
- Alcohol by volume: 5%
- Colour: Golden orange
- Flavour: "full-bodied lager a little on the sweet side, with a slightly bitter aftertaste"
- Ingredients: Water, barley, rice, hops

Korean name
- Hangul: 대동강맥주
- Hanja: 大同江麥酒
- RR: Daedonggang maekju
- MR: Taedonggang maekchu

Taedonggang (Korean: 대동강맥주) is a brand of North Korean beer brewed by the state-owned Taedonggang Brewing Company based in Pyongyang. There are four brands of beer marketed as Taedonggang, though the brand known simply as "Taedonggang Beer" is that described below.

== History ==
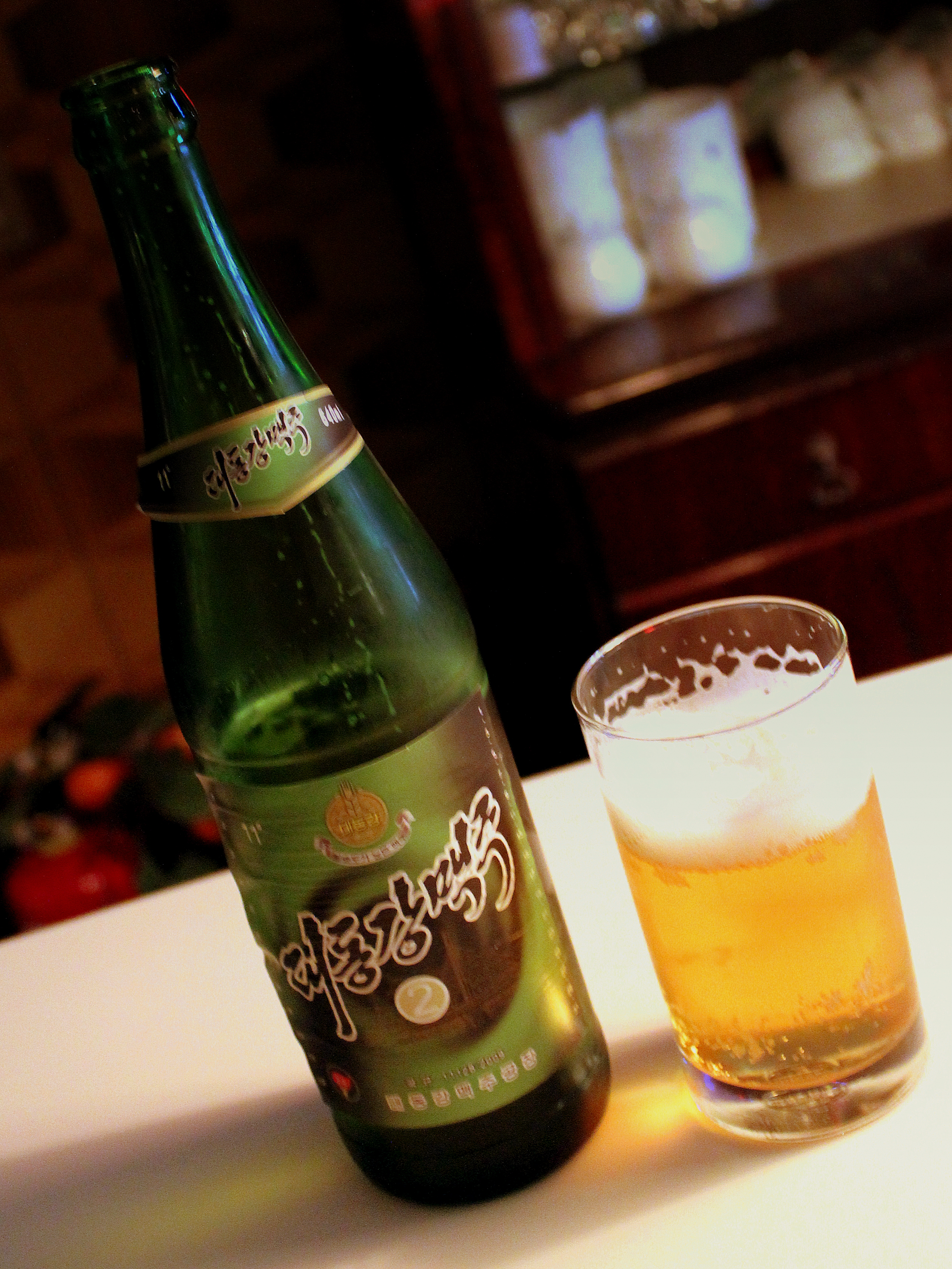
A bottle and glass of Taedonggang beer

In 2000, Kim Jong Il decided the country needed a showcase brewery. At that point having good relations with the West, via connections to Germany, the Government of North Korea bought the intact and still in place brewery plant of the closed Ushers of Trowbridge, Wiltshire, England for £1.5 million via broker Uwe Oehms. Concerned it could be used for chemical weapons production, after assurances, Peter Ward, of brewing company Thomas Hardy Brewing and Packaging bought the plant and arranged for a team from North Korea to travel to Trowbridge to dismantle it. Reinstalled and operational from 2002, the brewery uses German-made computerized brewing control technology. Since then, North Korea has had a steady supply of beer.

On 3 July 2009, a commercial for the product was broadcast on state-run Korean Central Television in a rare move, as there are very few advertisements on North Korean television. The commercial shows technicians sampling the beer and beer bottles floating in space, shooting out foam reminiscent of a missile launch. North Korea's Taepodong missiles are sometimes called "Taedong" missiles. The commercial has been broadcast three times in all.

Since 2016, the beer has been available in China in limited amounts.

== Product characteristics ==
Taedonggang beer is named after the Taedong River, which runs through the centre of Pyongyang. Its water comes from upstream Taedong River, barley and rice from South Hwanghae Province and hops from Ryanggang Province.

It has been certified with ISO 9001, ISO 22000 and HACCP.

Reviews of the currently produced varieties of Taedonggang beer are somewhat mixed. The most widely available Pilsner style lager is described by The New York Times as a "full-bodied lager a little on the sweet side, with a slightly bitter aftertaste" and "one of the highest quality beers on the [Korean] peninsula for several years". The BBC's Korea correspondent Steven Evans in a September 2016 review notes "an OK beer, a bit bland to my palate more used to magnificent British bitter - a bit too much like ghastly, dishwater, mass-produced American beer, in my opinion."

A Finnish review of Taedonggang's brown ale notes an alcohol content of 5% and a taste significantly more bitter than most Asian beers. Taedonggang lager resembles British ale.

== Types ==
Taedonggang beers are sorted by the amount of malt contained, and with numbers ranging from "7" to "1". Type "1" are made of pure malt, and "5" being pure rice. Out of type "1" to "5", the higher the number the more rice and less malt there is. Type "6" and "7" are both Schwarzbier, being "6" is made slightly more malt heavy than the other. Also, Taedonggang beer type "1" and "2" exported to Mainland China are 500 ml (18 imp fl oz; 17 US fl oz), unlike the 600 ml (21 imp fl oz; 20 US fl oz) version sold in North Korea and they have different package design.

== Availability ==
Taedonggang beer is targeted primarily at domestic consumers, but was exported to South Korea during the years of the Sunshine Policy. Limited export to South Korea began in 2005, where it is imported by Vintage Korea, a company based in Dogok, Gangnam, Seoul.

In mid-2007 availability of Taedonggang beer in South Korea began to lessen and it is widely believed now that it is no longer being imported into the country after the brewery increased the price 70% without warning.

According to expatriates in North Korea Taedonggang is the most popular brand of beer. It is widely served in restaurants and bars. The beer is also served in Pyongyang hotels catering to foreign visitors, where a small bottle costs about 0.5 euro.

== See also ==
- Beer in North Korea
- Taedonggang Brewing Company
