= Drinking culture of Korea =

The drinking culture of Korea (Korean: 한국의 술 문화) interfaces deeply with its social structure, lifestyle, and traditions. The beverages themselves are also reflective of the region's varying geography, climate, and culture.

Korean interest in making alcohol came about during the Koryo Dynasty (936–943), when exposure to foreign cultures and the introduction of distilled water provided the basis and technique for distilling alcohol.

Alcohol drinking in Korea has been described as helping create and form ties between family members and friends. Drinking is highly present within traditional family rituals, such as honoring ancestors. It has also become a major aspect of everyday socialization in Korean culture.

== History and occasions ==
Korea has a long tradition of consuming alcohol to celebrate holidays and seasonal events, in which people honor ancestors and exchange goodwill with neighbors and friends.

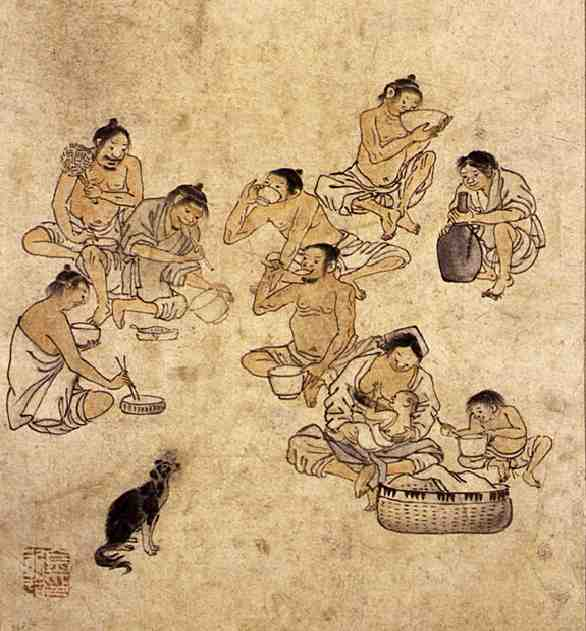
Hongdo Kim, Lunch

=== Farming ===
Drinking alcohol was often correlated with a season's passing and its related farming activities. Once a harvest ended, farmers would spend their downtime brewing and fermenting alcohol, as they looked forward to the spring.

Field workers often drank a glass of rice wine (takju) accompanied by a light breakfast snack, before heading to the fields. Traditional Korean music (nongak) would play while they worked.

=== Korean New Year ===
Upon the new year, Koreans consumed soju to drive out disease and bad spirits.

==== Daeboreum ====
The 15th day of the new year in the Korean calendar is a traditional holiday named Daeboreum. Many people attend moon-viewing events all over the region for the new year's first full moon. On that night, Koreans drink wine in hopes of receiving good news quickly for the next year. While children do not drink, they are encouraged to place their lips on the cup, then pour the wine down a chimney to deter sickness and vaporization.

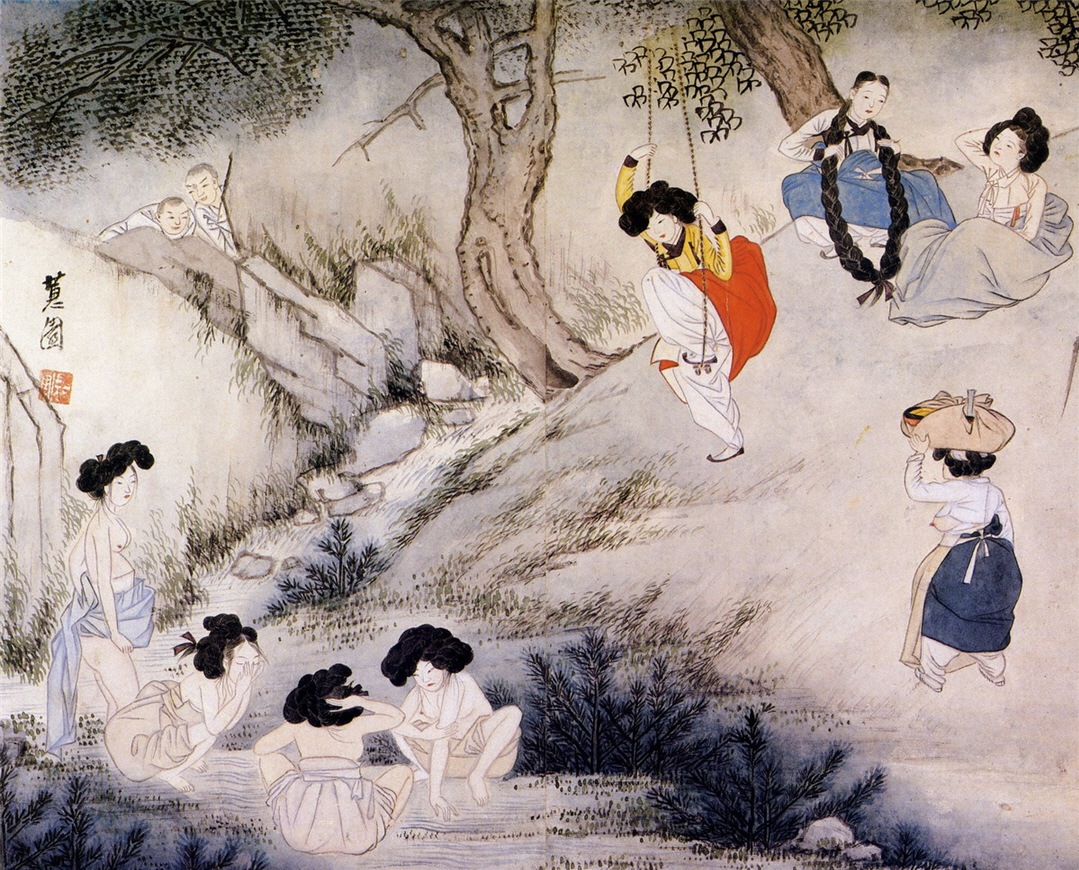
Yun-bok Shin 'Danopungjeong'

==== Dano ====
On the fifth day of the fifth month of the lunisolar calendar, Koreans celebrate the festival of Dano. This is an important holiday that honors the transplanting of rice seedlings, and it is the time of year when yin energy is weakest and yang is strongest.

During Dano, Koreans hold a memorial service for their ancestors and toast the day with a drink whose properties are said to repel evil spirits, providing escape from misfortune and promoting health and longevity.

=== Other uses ===
Alcohol consumption was also used to medicate both adults and children during illness. Because alcohol was held in such high regard, Korean people took great pains to pass down drinking customs from generation to generation.

== Drinking etiquette ==
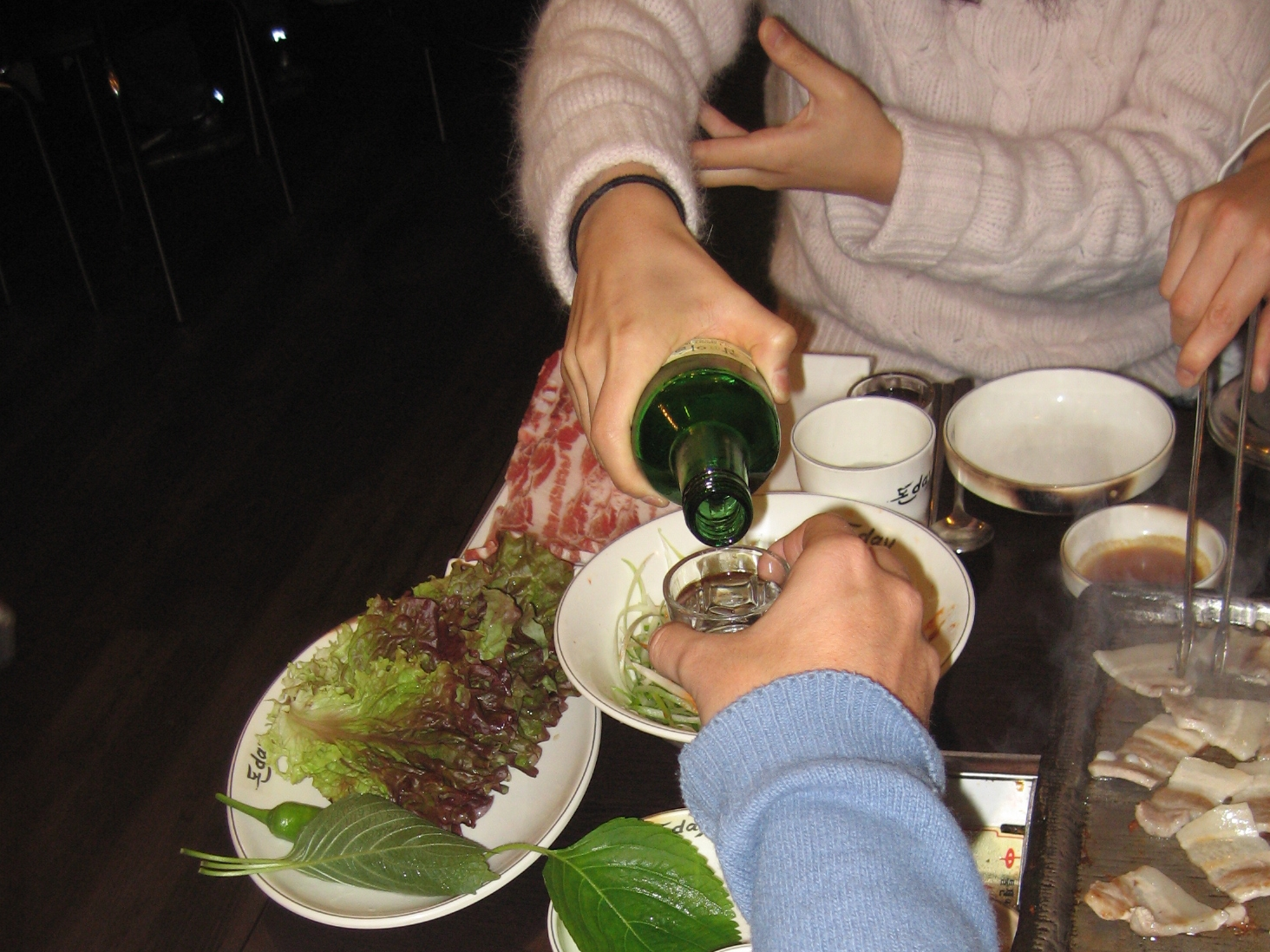
A glass of soju being poured

Koreans have strict rules of etiquette that apply to the consumption of alcoholic beverages. When receiving a cup from an elder, one must hold it with two hands (left palm at the bottom and holding the cup with the right hand) and bow their head slightly. When it is time to drink, the drinker must turn away from the elder and cover their mouth and cup with their hands. The first drink must be finished in one shot. When the cup is empty, the drinker hands it back to the person who poured it, and the drinker then pours that person a shot. This starts a series of cup-and-bottle passes around the table.

== Modern era ==
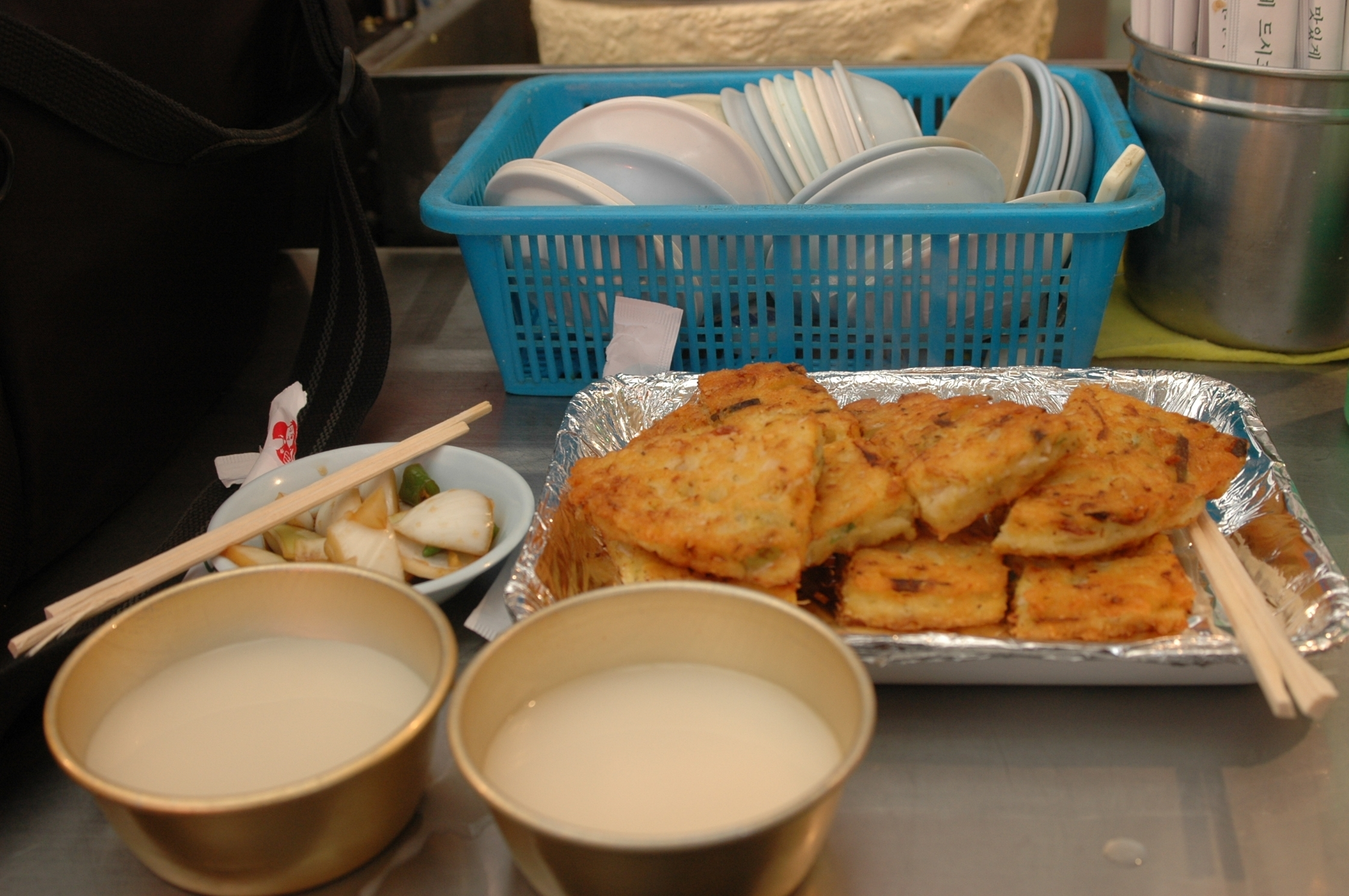
Makgeolli and bindaetteok

As society developed, drinking culture began to change. In the past, people drank on specific days, such as New Year's, but alcohol consumption later became common, regardless of the occasion. The types of alcoholic beverage consumed also changed, with bomb shots such as poktanju or cocktails including somaek becoming popular in the modern era.

=== Consumption trends ===
Drinking is a major part of modern Korean life. A large majority of Korean people regard it as a necessary element of socializing. According to a 2018 WHO report, South Koreans drink 10 litres (2.2 imp gal; 2.6 US gal) of alcohol per capita each year. By the mid-2020s, alcohol consumption was on the decline, due to health consciousness and post-COVID-19 pandemic changes to corporate culture.

=== Drinking and the workplace ===
Drinking plays an important role in workplace norms in Korean culture. One of the most important forms of socialization in Korean organizations is hoesik, or "dining together", which requires workers to attend events that involve alcohol consumption, often mandated by unwritten rules of workplace etiquette. It has been reported that a typical job application form will even ask applicants to reveal whether or not they drink alcohol, and if so, how much.

Reports have also shown that over 50% of Koreans drink in order to relieve stress, much of which is work-related.

Hoesik has been shown to have various negative impacts on employee welfare, productivity, and work environment. Frequent binge drinking may result in low work productivity due to tardiness, hangovers, or total work avoidance.

=== Health-related initiatives ===
In the mid-2010s, the South Korean government launched a campaign to decrease heavy drinking. It urged people to not mix their drinks, refrain from bar-hopping, and to return to their homes by 9 pm. Some corporations initiated new policies on hoesik, such as the "119 campaign", which enjoins workers to consume no more than one type of alcohol, visit no more than one venue, and no later than 9 pm. Other, similar initiatives, such as the "829 campaign" and "222 campaign", encourage workers to finish hoesik between 8 and 9 pm and not offer more than two drinks to others. Few of these efforts have met with success, however.

=== Alcohol-related disease ===
Drinking is the second leading cause of health decline in South Korea, with liver cancer and other liver disease being among the top ten causes of death in the nation. An increasing number of South Koreans have also been diagnosed with osteonecrosis, which is often caused by excessive alcohol consumption.

=== Hangover drinks ===
Hangover drinks (Korean: 숙취해소음료) are beverages sold in South Korea to ease a hangover after heavy drinking. They are typically consumed before drinking alcohol and are popular due to the prevalence of social drinking in the country. Ingredients in hangover drinks are said to break down toxins produced by the liver and reduce the impact of alcohol on neurotransmitters in the brain. Primary ingredients tend to derive from traditional Korean medicine, including Asian pear and Oriental raisin. Apart from beverages, hangover relief products also come in jelly, candy, and pill form.

A 2017 article stated that hangover remedies perform two main functions: helping break down acetaldehyde, an organic chemical compound that contributes to hangover, and helping stimulate liver function. It cited several local products containing such ingredients as Chinese juniper and turmeric, which are claimed to break down toxic substances within the body, as well as milk thistle, which is said to protect liver function.

== See also ==
- Korean alcoholic beverages
