= Omnipollo =

Swedish microbrewery

Omnipollo AB
- Company type: Private limited company
- Industry: Alcoholic beverage
- Founded: 2011
- Founder: Henok Fentie; Karl Grandin
- Headquarters: Stockholm, Sweden
- Website: https://omnipollo.com/

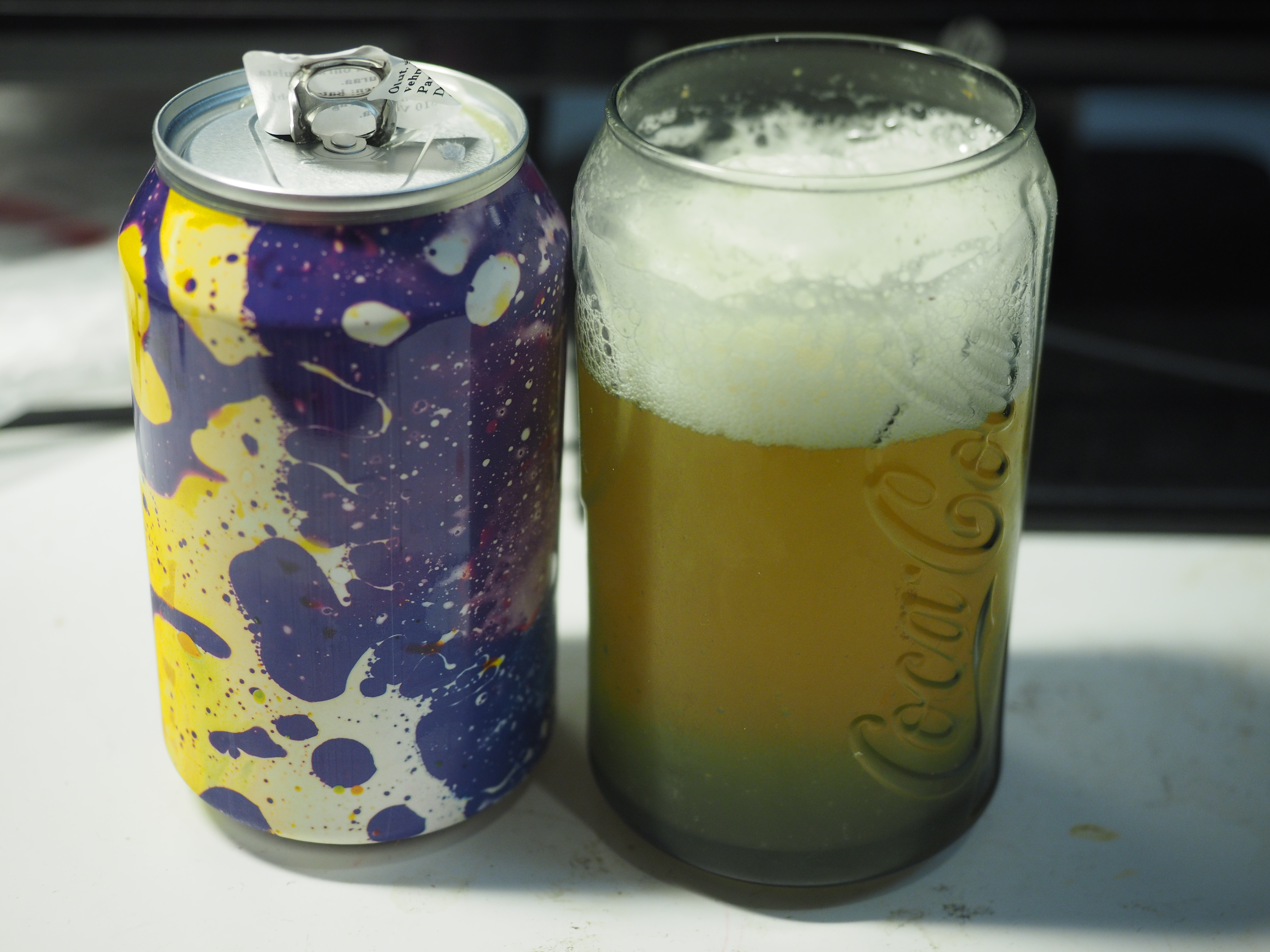
A can of Omnipollo Marbles pale ale, showing the vivid can design typical of Omnipollo.

Omnipollo is a Swedish microbrewery known for its style of beers and beer can design.

Omnipollo started as a "gypsy brewery", but as of 2020 Omnipollo has its own brewery, located inside an old church in Sundbyberg, Sweden. The company also operates bars in Stockholm, Hamburg and Tokyo.

The name Omnipollo comes from a portmanteau of the words "Omnipotent" and the Spanish word for chicken "Pollo".

== History ==
Omnipollo was founded in Stockholm by brewer Henok Fentie and artist Karl Grandin in 2010. A common friend of Fentie's and Grandin's saw that the pair had similar visions and introduced them to each other. They first discussed art more than beer but soon moved to creating their first beer product, a Belgian-style beer called Leon. The brewery has won several awards, for example their double IPA Nebuchadnezzar won the award for Best Beer of the Year at the Stockholm Beer & Whiskey Festival 2012.

== Bars ==
In 2015, the brewery opened the pub "Omnipollos hatt", which in addition to mainly their own produced beer, also serves pizza. In 2018, the bar "Omnipollo - Gothenburg" was also opened in Gothenburg which closed again in 2020 during the corona pandemic. In the summer of 2019, "Omnipollos Flora" opened in German Biergarten style in Humlegården in Stockholm. In autumn 2019, Omnipollo opened its first bar abroad, "Omnipollos Hamburg" in Hamburg, Germany. In 2020 Omnipollo opened a bar in Tokyo, Japan.
