= The Booth Brewing Co. =

Brewery from South Korea

The Booth Brewing Co. is a microbrewery headquartered in Seoul, South Korea. The brewery was founded in 2015 by Sunghoo Yang, a former investment analyst, Heeyoon Kim, a former Korean medical doctor, and Daniel Tudor, a journalist for The Economist. They had been operating a pizza pub since 2013. In 2015, they acquired a brewing facility in Eureka, California, previously owned by Lost Coast Brewery. They are well known for Taedonggang Pale Ale, a collaboration with Danish microbrewery Mikkeller, and also for being the second non-U.S. craft brewer to produce beer in their own facility in the United States.

== History ==
The brewery started as a small, casual pub in the alleyways of Gyeongnidan in Seoul. The idea to start the pub was inspired by Tudor's article in The Economist, which claimed: "brewing remains just about the only useful activity at which North Korea beats the South." The pub began selling Bill's Pale Ale, The Booth's first brew, along with a small selection of pizza. After realizing how crucial the cold chain transportation system was to maintaining the quality and flavor of beer, the owners established the first cold chain import and distribution system, The Booth Cold Chain. This was soon importing beers from Mikkeller, Evil Twin, To Øl, and 8 Wired. Two crowdfunding campaigns titled Equity for Booth were launched, in September 2015 and February 2017.

== Production ==
The Booth's beers are produced at four locations (The Booth's Pangyo Brewery, The Booth's Eureka Brewery, Brew Hub, and De Proefbrouwerij), on three continents (Asia, North America, and Europe). Production at Brew Hub has helped quintuple The Booth's production of their flagship beers, Kukmin IPA and Kieuk IPA. Its beers include Taedonggang Pale Ale: International Pale Ale, made in collaboration with Danish gypsy-brewery Mikkeller, and Kieuk Session IPA: Session India Pale Ale, made in collaboration with Kiha and the Faces, an indie music band from Korea. In October 2015, they acquired a brewing facility in Eureka, California, formerly owned by Lost Coast Brewery. In December 2020, the Eureka facility was shut down.

== The Beer Week Seoul ==
The Booth hosts one of the biggest craft beer events in Korea, the Beer Week Seoul. The event introduces breweries and sells beers normally unavailable to the Korean market. Breweries such as Other Half, Mikkeller, Evil Twin, To Øl, and AleSmith have participated in the past.

The Booth's flagship beer, Kukmin IPA, was awarded Best Craft Beer at the 2017 Korea Wine and Spirits Awards. Two of the co-founders, Heeyoon Kim and Sunghoo Yang, were selected for Forbes 30 Under 30 Asia for 2017.
