= Ushers of Trowbridge =

Former brewery in Wiltshire, England

Coordinates: 51.3218°N 2.21011°W

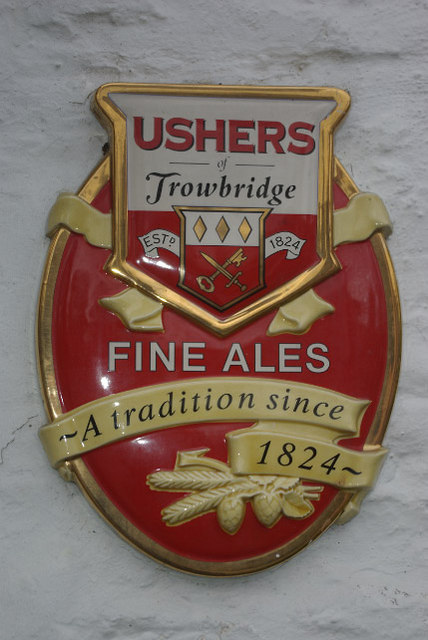
- Industry: Alcoholic beverage
- Founded: 1824; 202 years ago
- Founder: 1824–1959: Usher family 1960–1971: Watney Mann; 1972–1989: Grand Metropolitan; 1990–2004: Independent
- Defunct: 2004; 22 years ago, purchased by Punch Taverns
- Headquarters: Trowbridge, Wiltshire, England
- Area served: Southwest
- Key people: Thomas Usher
- Products: Beer
- Footnotes; Ushers beers now brewed by Wychwood Brewery

Ushers of Trowbridge was a brewery in Trowbridge, Wiltshire, England, between 1824 and 2000.

== History ==
In 1824, Thomas Usher and his wife Hannah acquired a small brewery in Back Street, Trowbridge, renaming it Usher's Wiltshire Brewery. In 1844, the couple's three sons joined the partnership, allowing the parents to retire in 1869. After this, the beers and brand developed a loyal following, facilitating a quick expansion of the company through the 19th century. In 1887, the partnership took over Fanshaw & Palmer of Donnington, Berkshire. This resulted in the registration in 1889 of Usher's Wiltshire Brewery Ltd to combine the two organisations. From its date of formation until the Second World War, the company acquired some fifteen independent breweries and their associated public house premises.

After 1945, the company acquired Conigre House and gardens in Trowbridge, then the home of the local Liberal Club, enabling it to double the scale of its brewery and bottling plant.

Having dropped the apostrophe from its registered name in 1951, in 1960 the company agreed to a takeover bid from the acquisitive Watney Mann. The joint assets included the brewery sites in both London (soon closed) and Trowbridge, together with 900 pubs. In 1964, the company changed its registered name to Ushers Brewers Ltd. Watney Mann merged with Grand Metropolitan Hotels in 1972.

In 1991 Roger North, the MD of Grand Met Brewing led a management buyout creating a reconstituted Ushers Brewers Ltd, with an estate of smaller pubs deemed by Grand Metropolitan to be too small or not capable of redevelopment. The new company began acquiring pubs to provide a distribution network, under a holding company called Innspired Pubs. By March 1997 the company owned 541 pubs and floated on the London Stock Exchange after a previous float had been aborted in 1995.

Following a profit warning, North took the company private again in December 1998 with the backing of Alchemy Partners. The accounts to 31 October 1998 showed the brewery making operating profit of £6.3m on sales of £45.8m whilst the tenanted pubs had an operating profit of £11.7m on turnover of £27.9m. However, North fell out with Alchemy because they "wanted to take Ushers down a route with less emphasis on brewing and brands". Alchemy merged Ushers with 250 pubs in the Alehouse chain that they had acquired in June 1997, and replaced North with Robert Breare who came from a hotel background and proclaimed himself "a devotee of a major separation between brewing and retail". Breare claimed that the brewery was "big enough to make serious money. When it is close to capacity it is very, very profitable" but it was running at 70% of its 600,000 barrels-per-year capacity and was closed in 2000.

The residual pub operator company, renamed Innspired Pubs plc, was bought by Punch Taverns in September 2004. Today, beers are brewed under the Usher name by the Wychwood Brewery for Refresh UK.

== Legacy ==
The brewery equipment was sold for £1.5M to North Korea via German broker Uwe Oehms. It now forms the core of the Taedonggang brewery, just outside Pyongyang. In 2009, its new brew "Taedong River Beer" made international headlines after featuring in what is thought to be North Korean television's first beer advert.

The main Trowbridge site was redeveloped into housing (including the Ushers Apartments) and a Sainsbury's supermarket.
