= Magpie Brewing =

South Korean craft brewery

Magpie Brewing Co.
- Location: Seoul and Jeju, South Korea
- Opened: 2011; 15 years ago
- Website: www.magpiebrewing.com

Magpie Brewing Co. is a South Korean craft brewery based in Seoul and on Jeju Island. Founded in 2011 as a home-brewing project in the Itaewon district of Seoul, it grew into one of the country's better-known craft beer producers, operating taprooms in Seoul and on Jeju as well as its own brewery on the island.

== History ==
Magpie began in 2011 when a group of friends started brewing beer in a home-brewing studio near Gyeongnidan-gil in Itaewon, Seoul. One of the co-founders, Erik Moynihan, has said the venture started as a hobby before becoming a commercial operation. The company opened a bar in the Tapdong area of Jeju City in 2014, and in 2016 it built its own brewery in a converted citrus warehouse on Jeju Island. Its head office is in the Yongsan District of Seoul.

By 2019 the company was exporting to Hong Kong and Thailand and ran a membership programme for its sour and barrel-aged beers.

== Beers ==
Magpie produces a range of styles including pale ale, porter and a gose called "The Ghost". In 2019, The Ghost was named Champion Beer of Asia at the SEA Brew conference in Thailand, a competition organised with the German hops company Barth-Haas; the beer also took gold in two of the contest's categories.

== Locations ==
The company's original venue is its taproom in Itaewon, Seoul. It later expanded with locations in Seoul and on Jeju Island, including a brewpub in Jeju City.

== Reception ==
Magpie has been described in English-language media as a notable stop on South Korea's craft beer scene. The Korea Times reported on the brewery's tenth anniversary in 2022.
