= Dogos =

Dogos may refer to:

- Plural of dogo (disambiguation), in various senses
- Dogos XV, a professional rugby union team based in Cordoba, Argentina
- Stefanos Dogos (born 1994), a Greek footballer
- Rastislavice (Hungarian: Dögös), a village and municipality in the Nové Zámky District in the Nitra Region of south-west Slovakia

== See also ==
- DOGSO, denial of obvious goal-scoring opportunity, a type of professional foul in association football
- Doggos, dog-based internet meme
