= Helsingborgs Bryggeri =

Brewery in Scania, Sweden

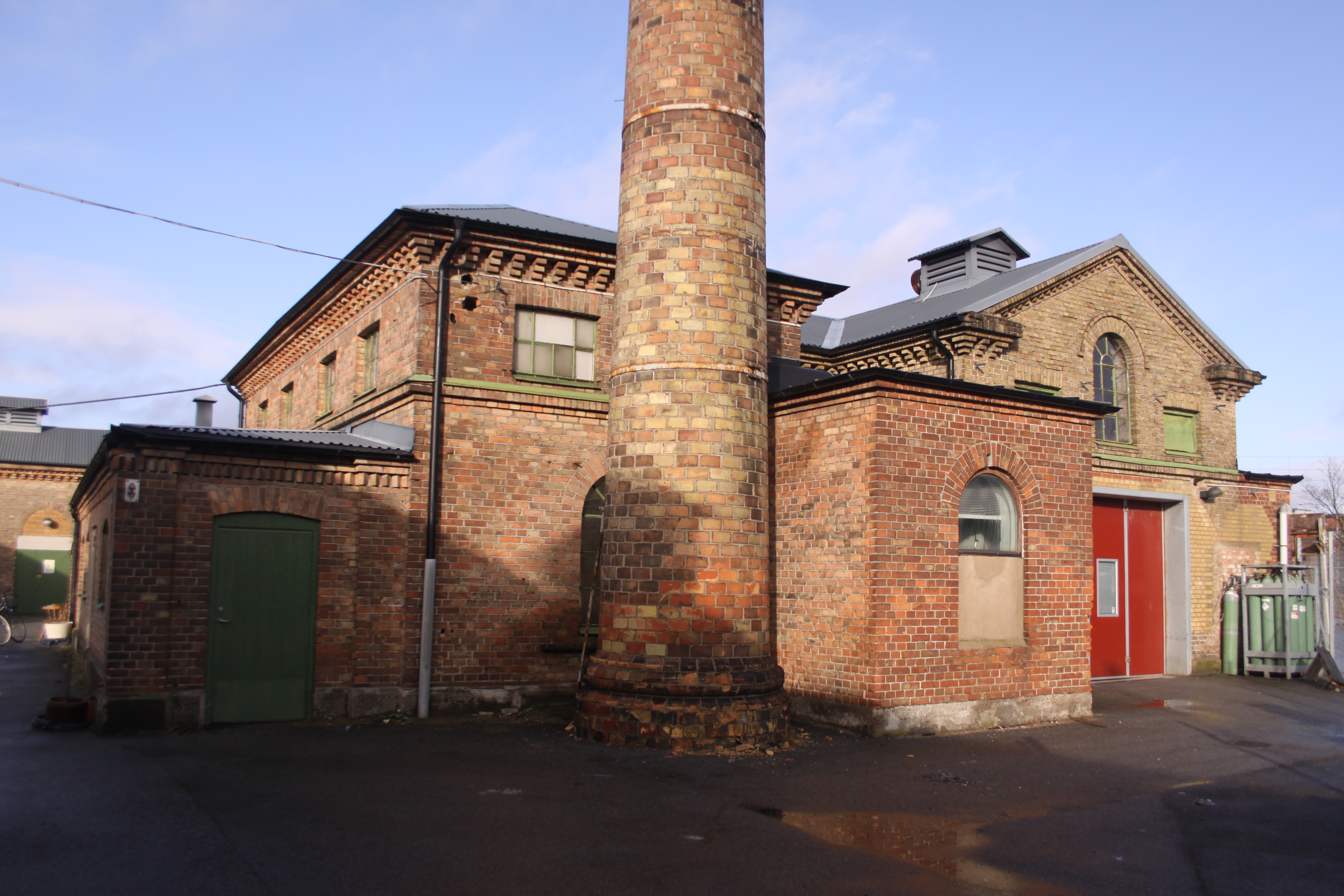
- Industry: Microbrewery
- Founded: 2010
- Headquarters: Helsingborg, Sweden
- Products: Beer
- Website: Helsingborgsbryggeri.se

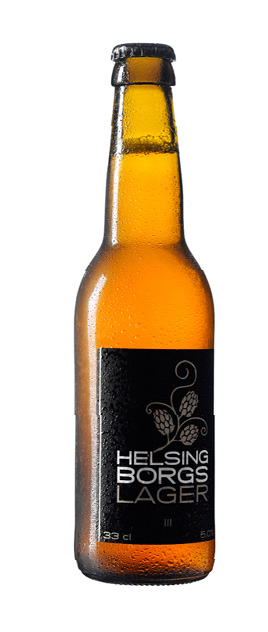
A bottle of Helsingborgs Lager

Helsingborgs Bryggeri is a Swedish microbrewery, based in northeastern Scania, Sweden. Since the first beer was bottled in the summer of 2011, the company has brewed 16 different kinds of strong beer, many of them with ingredients such as liquorice and coffee from companies in and around Helsingborg.

== Early history and new start ==
The original "Hälsingborgs Bryggeri" was founded in 1850 by Swedish bank director S. H. Hafström. It, along with many other microbreweries of that time, was bought by the large brewery Pripps in 1967, and it was shut down in 1975.

Two beer enthusiasts named Rasmus Varfeldt and Hans Nelson started a new brewery under the same name in 2010, and in 2013 they brewed around 80 000 litres (21 000 gallons) of beer. In 2011, they won a prize for "Best Swedish Lager" at the Gothenburg Beer and Whiskey Festival for their "Helsingborgs Lager".
