= Wermlands Brygghus =

Microbrewery in Kristinehamn, Värmland, Sweden

Coordinates: 59.3164954°N 14.1127203°E

- Type: Microbrewery
- Location: Kristinehamn Municipality, Värmland County, Sweden
- Opened: 2013
- Annual production volume: 1,000 hectolitres (850 US bbl)
- Owned by: Wermlands Brygghus AB
- Website: http://wermlandsbrygghus.se/

Active beers
Name	Type
Wermlands Premiärbrygd	American Pale Ale
Wermlands Ale	American Pale Ale
Wermlands Ale 3,5 %	American Pale Ale, Low-alcohol beer
Wermlands Lättöl	Ale, Low-alcohol beer
Wermlands IPA	India Pale Ale
Wermlands Kaffestout	Stout
Wermlands Lager	Pale lager
Wermlands Lager 3,5 %	Pale lager, Low-alcohol beer
Wermlands Lättale Dunkel	Ale, Low-alcohol beer

Seasonal beers
Name	Type
Wermlands Vinter	Ale, Christmas beer
Wermlands Vinter 3,5 %	Ale, Christmas beer, Low-alcohol beer

Other beers
Name	Type
Wermlands Champale	Bière de Champagne / Bière Brut

Wermlands Brygghus is a microbrewery located in Kristinehamn, Värmland, in the west of central Sweden.

The brewery was founded in 2012 by Hans and Christina Skan. It is the first microbrewery in Värmland and the first operating brewery in Kristinehamn since 1957, when the then last operating brewery was taken over by Pripps and subsequently closed.

Brewing started in 2013, and the first beer brewed was the Wermlands Premiärbrygd. The Wermlands Premiärbrygd was originally intended to be a one-time production, but it has since become brewed on a regular basis.

Wermlands Brygghus has seen substantial growth since its founding. Yearly production was 100,000 liters in 2016, compared to 45,000 liters in 2013. By 2016, the brewery had two full-time employees and two part-time employees.

The brewery moved from its first premises outside Kristinehamn to much larger premises near the train station in Kristinehamn in 2017. The new place measures 700 square meters, with 10 meters in ceiling height. The brewery is now housed one of the old brick buildings belonging to former turbine-producer Kristinehamn Turbin AB (now Blue Future Turbine AB). The building dates back to 1913 and is part of the local industrial heritage. With the new premises and investments in new equipment, the brewery increased its capacity and aimed to successively increase yearly production to 500,000 liters. The new premises also made possible a brew pub, which opened on 30 April 2017.

The brewery had an assortment of 12 beers, including a seasonal Christmas beer and five low-alcohol beers, as of 2017.

The brewery offers tours and openings for both private persons and companies. In addition, the brewery also offers a brew pub, where the assortment can be tasted at regular occasions.

== Distribution ==
Distribution is mainly concentrated to Värmland in central Sweden. The beers can be found at certain pubs, restaurants and hotels. The low-alcohol beers can also be found at various grocery stores, approximately one hundred grocery stores in central and southern Sweden as of 2016. The standard alcohol beers can also be found or, when not included in the local standard assortment, specially ordered at Systembolaget. As of 2016, beers from Wermlands Brygghus can be found at 14 Systembolaget stores in Värmland.
