= Dogo =

Dogo may refer to:

== Dogs ==
- Various molossoid dogs breeds originating in Spanish-speaking regions, including
  - the Dogo Argentino
  - the Dogo Canario, now known as Presa Canario
  - the Dogo Cubano, extinct
  - the Dogo Español or Alano Español
  - the Dogo Mallorquín or Ca de Bou
  - the Dogo Sardesco

== Places ==
- Dogo, Sikasso, Mali
- Dogo, Mopti, Mali
- Dogo, Niger
- Dōgo Onsen, a hot spring in Japan
- Dōgojima, an island in Japan
- Mount Dōgo, a mountain in Japan

== Other uses ==
- Dogo Janja, singer-songwriter and rapper
- Dogo Beer, brand of beer
- Dogo, Paa - a Ghanaian musician

== See also ==
- Dogo-Dogo, Niger
- Club Dogo
- DoggoLingo
