= Vienna microbreweries =

Microbreweries in Vienna, Austria

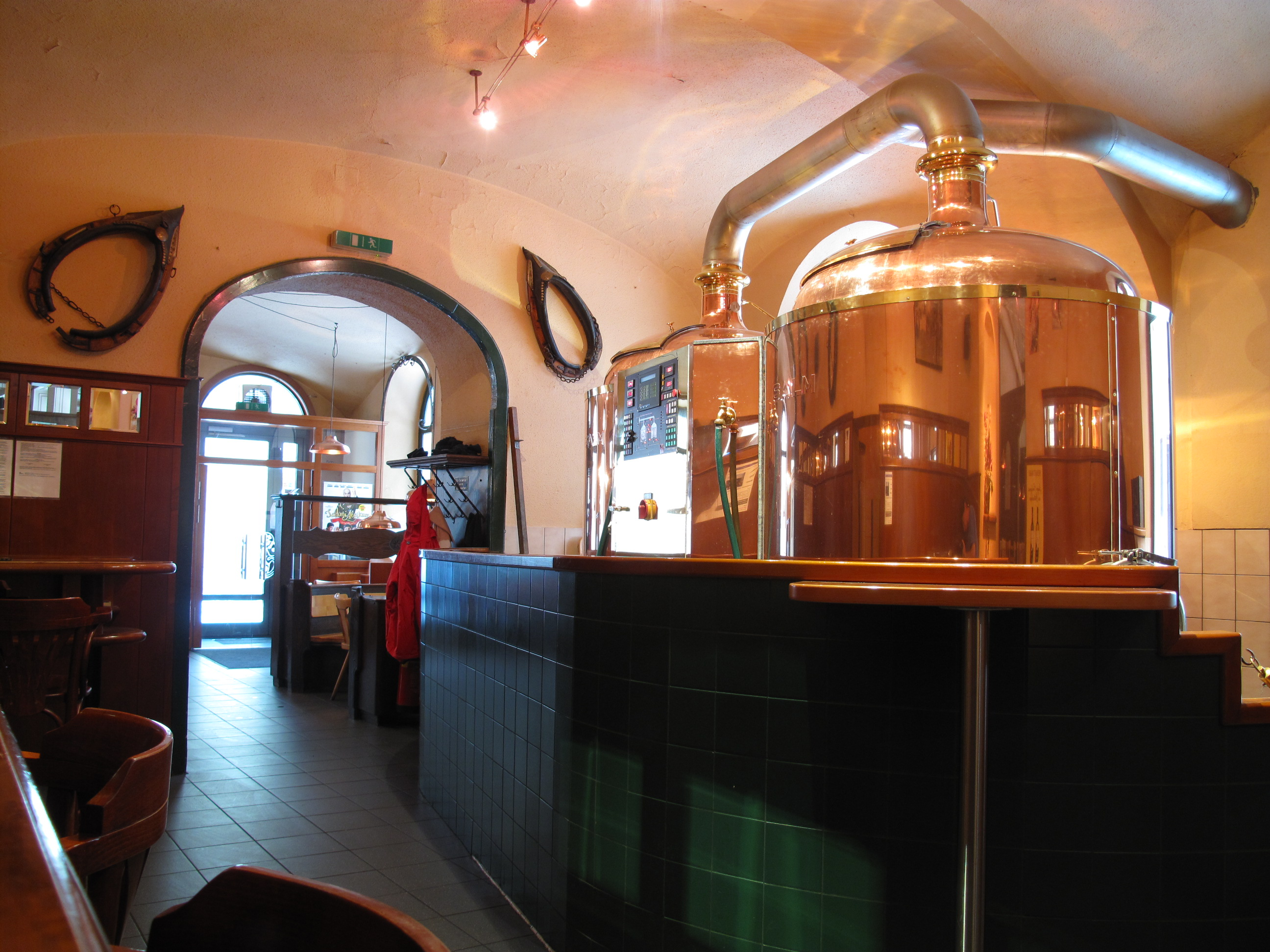
Wieden Bräu, a typical Viennese microbrewery. Customers can sit close to the copper brewing equipment.

The Viennese microbrewery (German: Wiener Brauhaus, Wiener Kleinbrauerei) is a typical institution of Vienna. These microbreweries serve their own beer to the public. They also serve food, in many cases traditional Austrian dishes. In many cases the actual brew equipment is in the center of the place and the tables for the customers are located around the equipment. Some microbreweries open in the late morning and offer both lunch and dinner, others open in the late afternoon. Notice: The term "X-Bräu" does not always mean that it is a real brew pub.
