= Dogo Beer =

Brand of beer

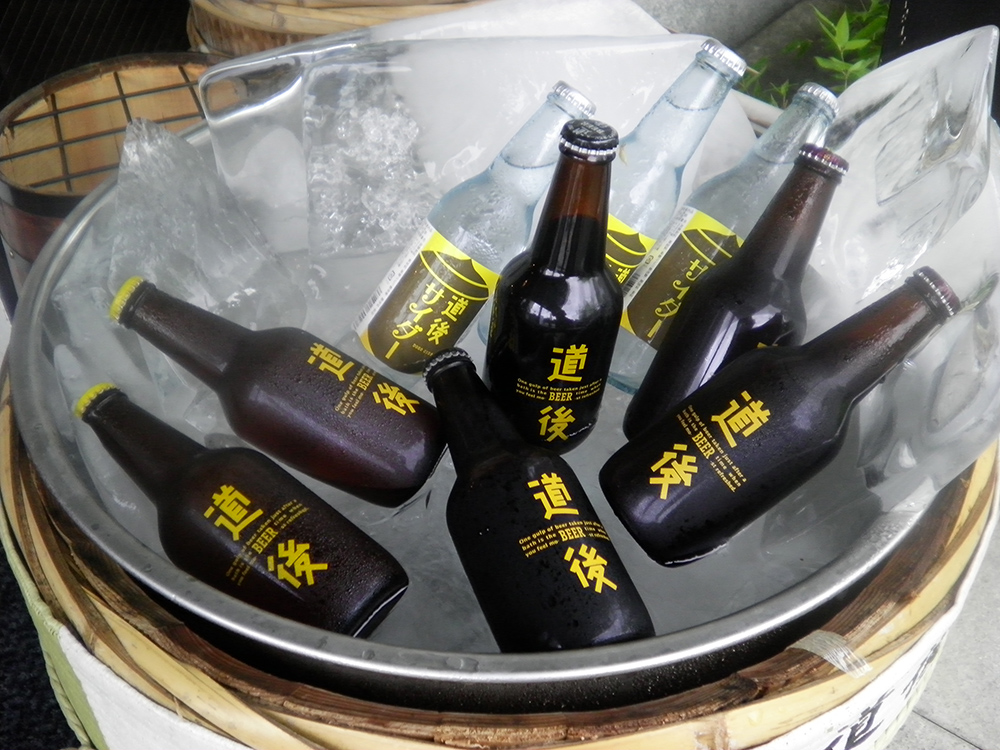
Dogo Beer

Dogo Beer (道後ビール) is a brand of beer brewed by Minakuchi-Shuzō’s microbrewery in Dōgo, Matsuyama, Ehime, Japan. One of the features of Dogo Beer is its stronger bubbles, as it is intended to be consumed after taking a meal at Dōgo Onsen.

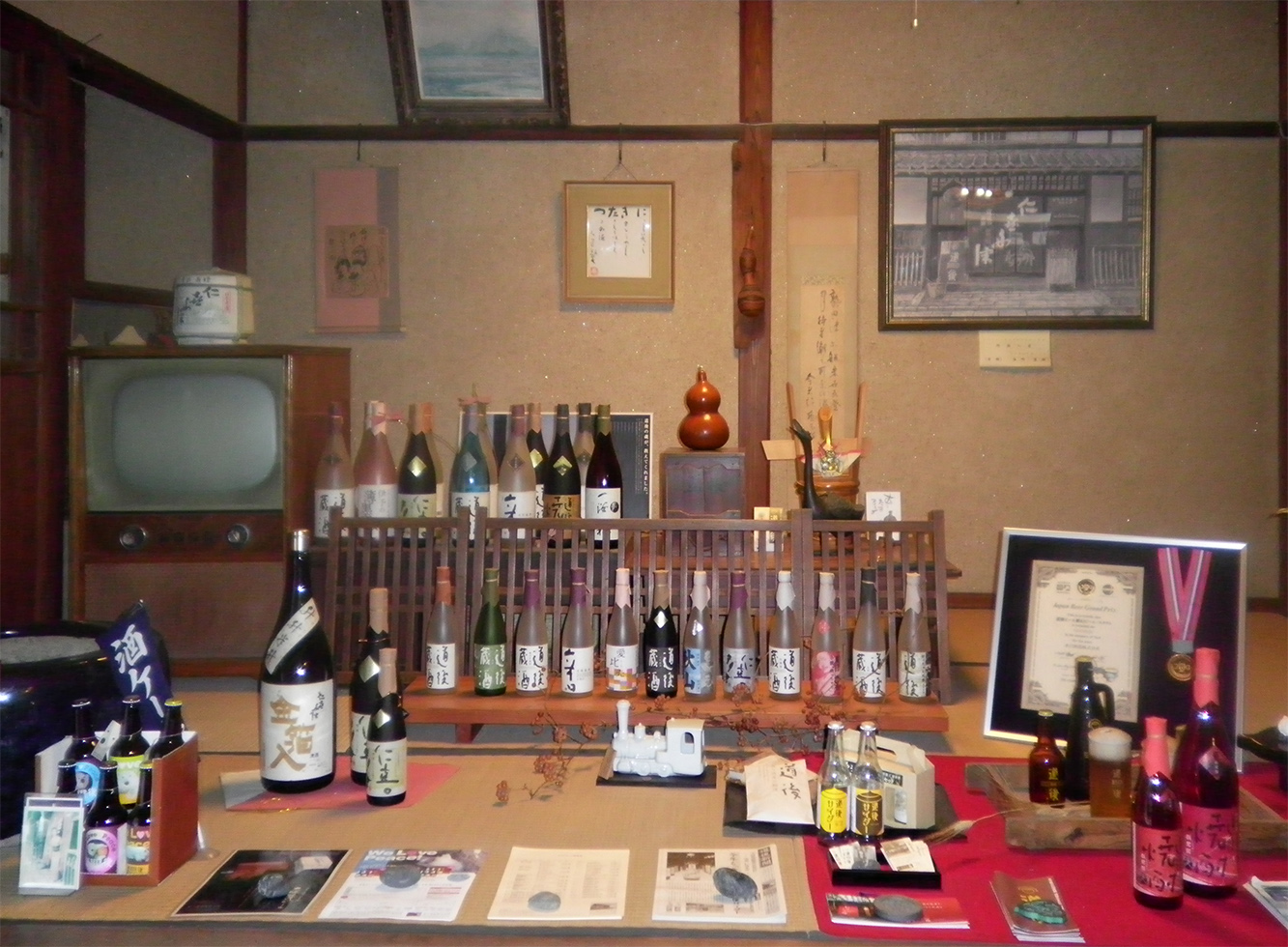
Inside Minakuchi Shuzo

== History ==
Minakuchi Shuzo, which makes Dogo Beer, was founded during the Japanese Meiji era in 1895. Dogo beer was created in August 1996.

Dogo Beer can be purchased at Nikitasu kurabu, a retail shop, and also served at Nikitatsuan, a restaurant established in October 1996. Fresh Dogo Beer can be purchased at Dogo Biru Kan, which opened in November 1996 in front of Dogo Onsen.

== Types of Dogo Beer ==
There are four main types of Dogo beer:

- Dogo Botchan 5% (Kölsch)
- Dogo Madonna 5% (Altbier)
- Dogo Soseki 5% (Stout)
- Dogo Nobosan 5% (Hefeweizen)

== Making Dogo Beer ==
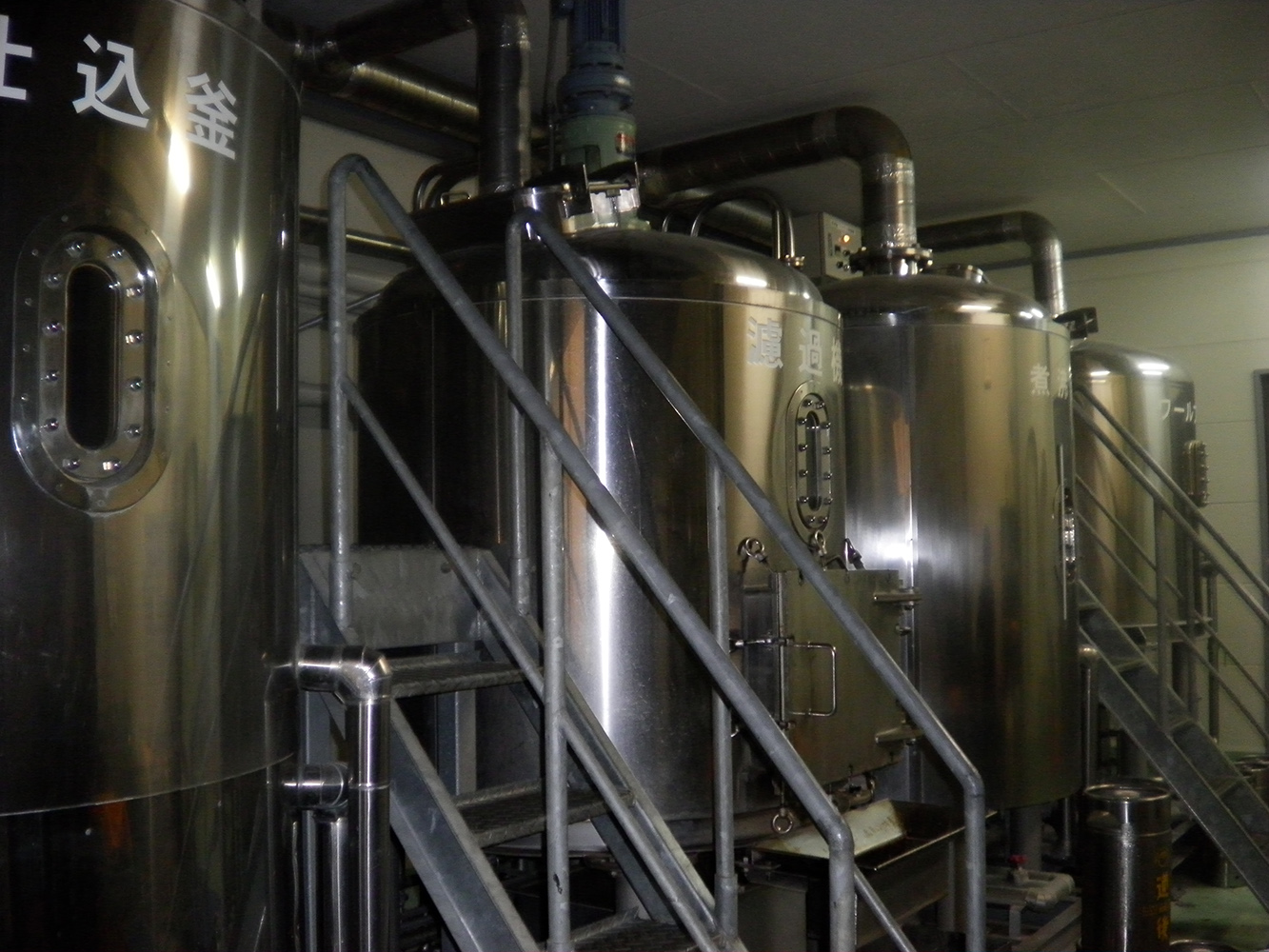
Making Dogo Beer

According to a Dogo beer company pamphlet, Dogo beer is made according to the following procedures, which are in line with the brewing practices most commonly used today:

1. Malt is put into hot water, and then the malt starch changes into malt sugar.
2. Liquid is filtered, and made to be clear.
3. Hops are added and heated up enough, at that moment the particular smell and bitter taste of beer are generated.
4. Solid protein is removed and leaving a transparent liquid.
5. It is cooled in a bacteria-free condition.
6. Oxygen and beer yeast are added into it causing fermentation. The yeast makes sugar split into alcohol and carbonic acid.
7. It is poured into some containers and aged at 0 degrees to make its taste mild.

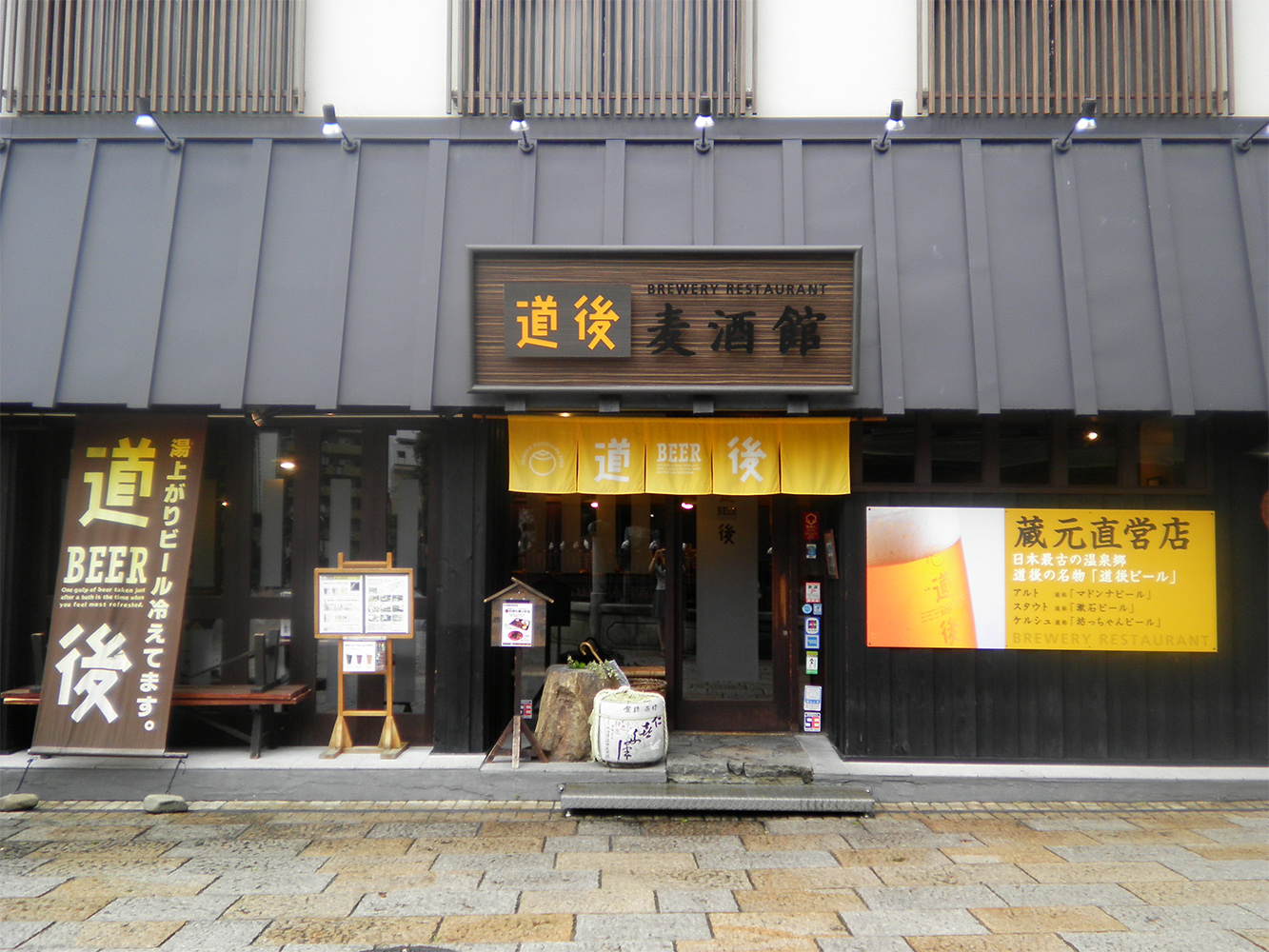
Dogo Brewery Restaurant
