= Craft beer in South Korea =

A 2014 revision of the liquor tax law eased restrictions on small-scale breweries, triggering a rapid expansion of the craft beer industry across South Korea. The number of breweries grew from 54 in 2014 to more than 100 by 2018. Microbreweries in South Korea have expanded the base not only in the domestic market, but also in overseas markets. It has been increasing that demand and supply of microbreweries and pubs.

== History ==
South Korean beer has a reputation for blandness and low quality. North Korean beer, in contrast, tends not to be as light and is considered relatively good for Asian beer. The British business weekly The Economist caused an uproar in South Korea when it declared in 2012 that "brewing remains just about the only useful activity at which North Korea beats the South." The article and the success of North Korean microbreweries prompted the South Korean beer industry to reform, including changing the alcohol law to allow microbrewing, in 2014.

== List of South Korean microbreweries ==
- The Booth Brewing Co.: Located in Gyeongnidan. Began as a small pub in 2013. It produces 'Kukmin IPA', 'Dae-Dong Gang Pale Ale', 'Summer Zen Ale', 'Brewbro IPA' etc. It also serves a tap by 8 pubs in Seoul.
- Band of Brewers: pub and brewery in Seonreung.
- Praha993: Czech pub and brewery located in Mangmi 2(i)-dong, Busan.
- Korea craft breweries: Located in Chungbuk. It has been ordered by Hitachino Nest.
- The hand and Malt : Located in Namyangju. Owner of Korea's largest hops farm. 100% owned by brewing giant AB-InBev since 2018
- Gorilla Brewing: Located in Busan Gwangan-ri.
- Galmegi Brewing Co.: American style brewery located in Busan Gwangan-ri.
- Magpie Brewing Co.: Founded in 2012 in the Gyeongnidan area of Itaewon, Seoul, one of South Korea's earliest craft breweries. The company operates venues in Itaewon, Euljiro, and Jeju City, and produces all beers at its brewery on Jeju Island (opened 2016).
- Budnamu Brewery: Pub and brewery in Gangneung. It produces beers using local ingredients from Korea as well as western style craft beer.
- Stevens Brewing: Located in Sinsa-dong. It has been provided One-day class for making craft beer.
- SteinDorf-Bräu: Pub and brewery Located in Song-pa.
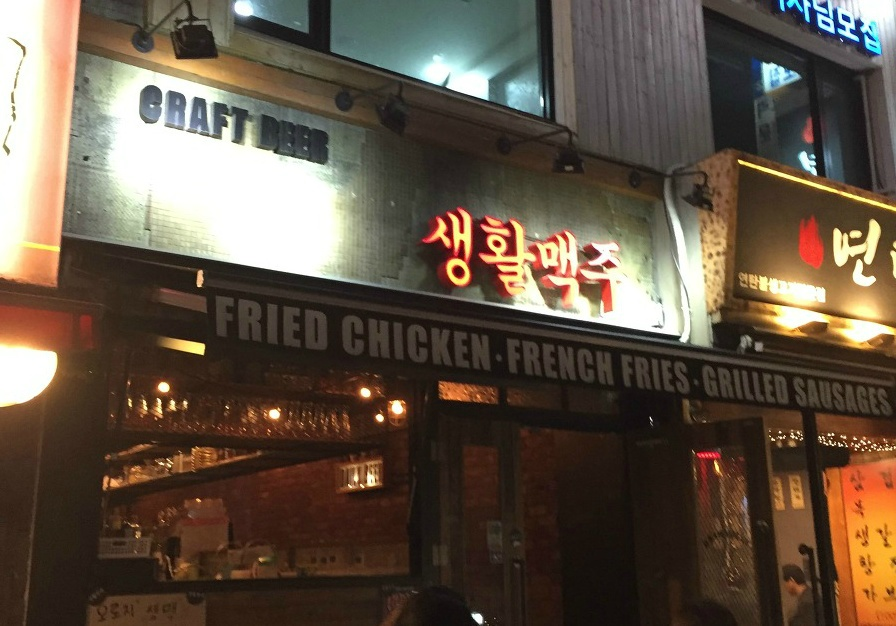
  Saenghwal Beer in Shin nonhyun
- AKITU Brewery: Brewery located in Busan.
- Wild Wave Brewing: Pub and brewery in Busan.
- Pyrus: Pub and Brewery in Itaewon.
- Pond Dang: Pub and Brewery in Garosu-gil.
- Play-ground Brewery: It has tap room in Ilsan, Songdo. And It has logo motivated from Korean traditional mask 'Haheo Tal'.
- Travier: Brewery in Ulsan.
- Whasoo Brewery: Pub and Brewery in Ulsan. It produces 'citron pale ale',
- Won Nation Brewery: located in Hapjeong, Seoul. Constantly producing seasonal beers.
- Hidden Track: Brewery in Dongdae-moon.
- Saenghwal Beer: It has the most pubs in South Korea.
- Seoul Brewery: Brewpub in Hapjeong, Seoul https://www.seoulbrewery.com/

== See also ==
- Beer in South Korea
- Beer in North Korea
