= Bourgogne des Flandres =

Belgian beer

Bourgogne des Flandres Brune
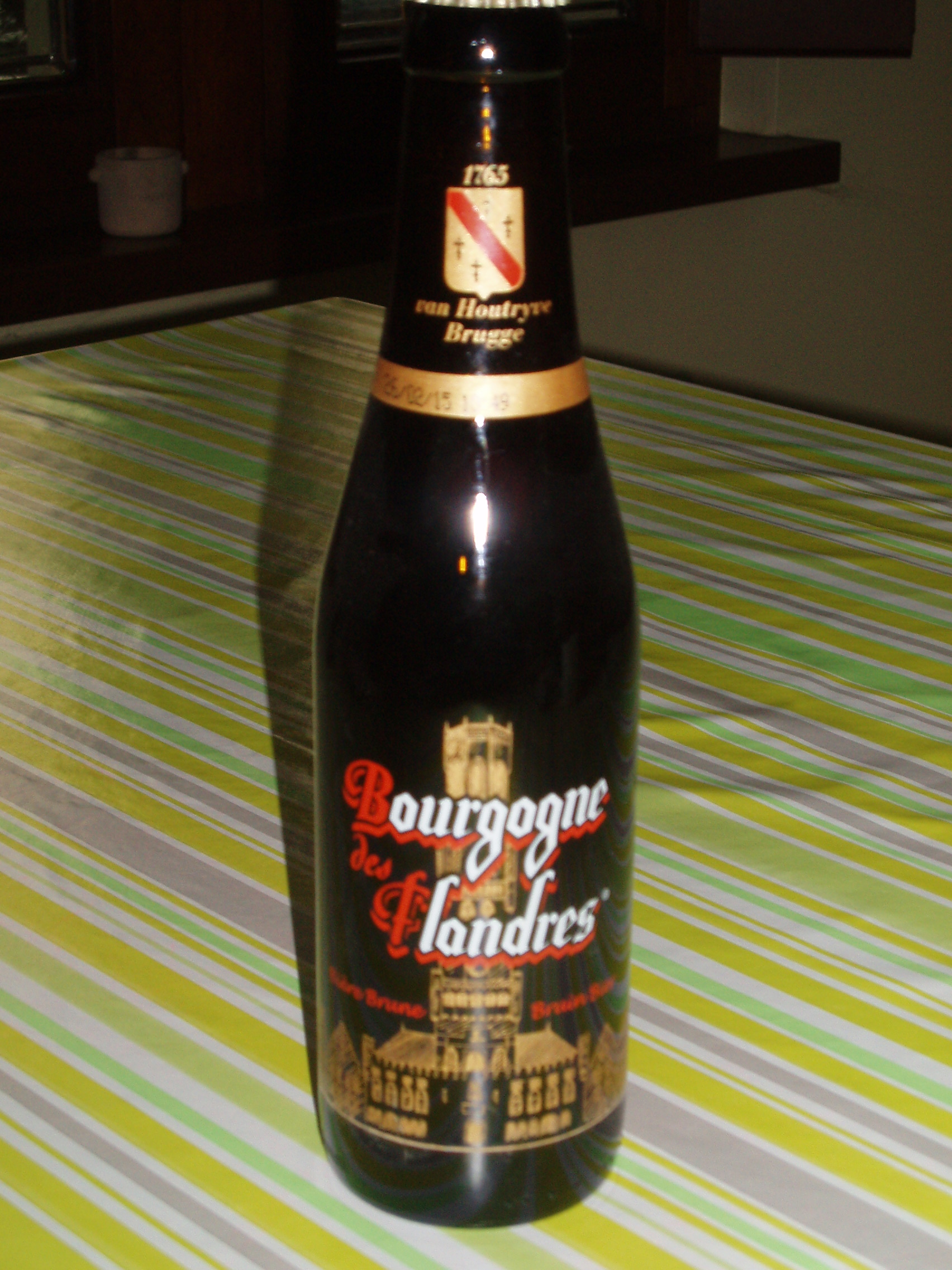
- Type: Special
- Manufacturer: Timmermans Brewery
- Origin: Belgium
- Introduced: 1911
- Alcohol by volume: 5%
- Colour: Brown

Bourgogne des Flandres Blonde
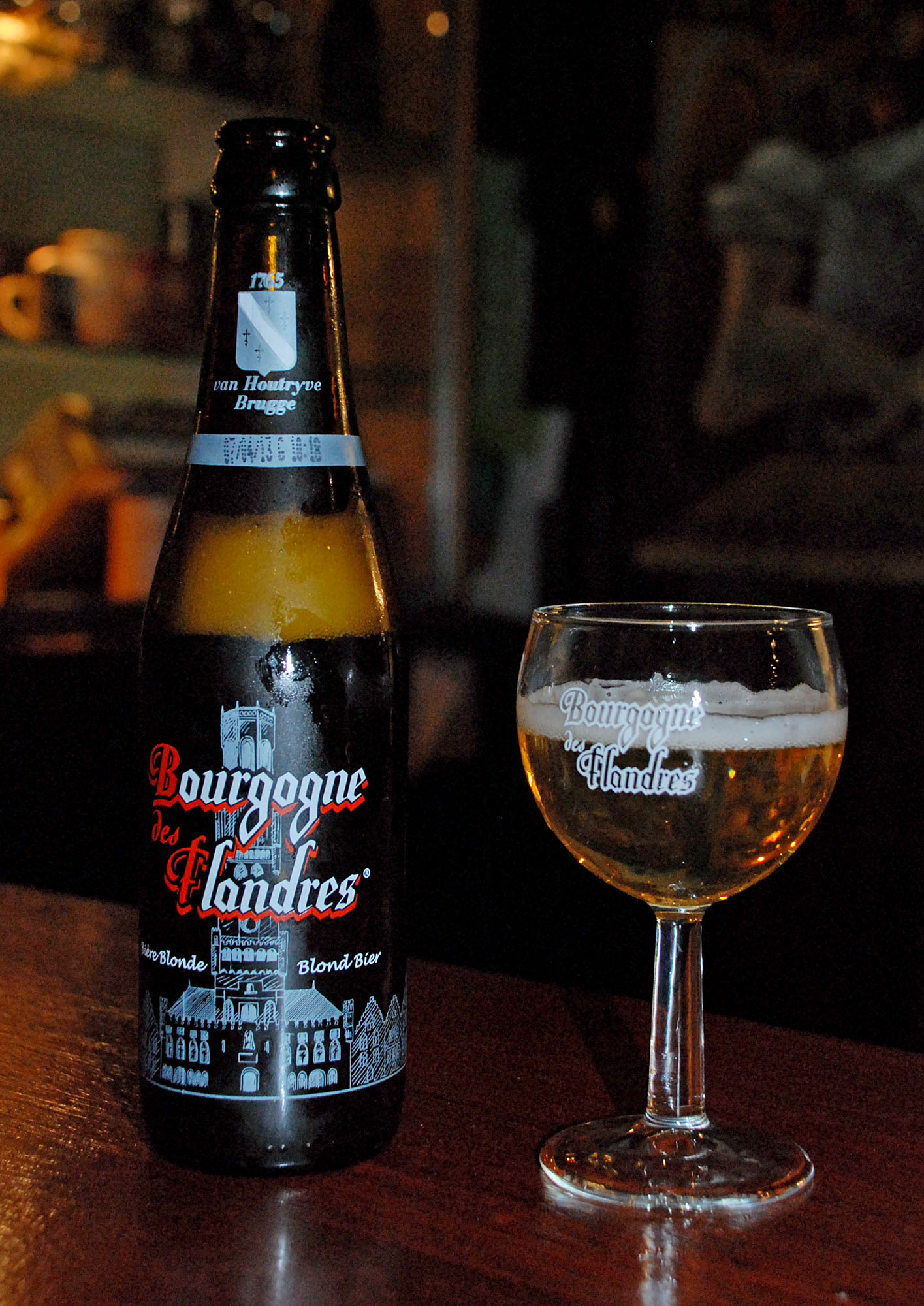
- Type: Blonde
- Manufacturer: Timmermans Brewery
- Origin: Belgium
- Alcohol by volume: 6%

Bourgogne des Flandres is a Belgian beer brewed by Timmermans Brewery in Itterbeek in the municipality of Dilbeek which is located in Flemish Brabant.

== History ==
Bourgogne des Flandres has existed since 1911. It was then brewed by Van Houtryve Family. In 1957, it was produced by the Verhaeghe Brewery which would produce later on the Duchesse de Bourgogne. Since the early 1990s, Bourgogne des Flandres has been brewed by the Timmermans Brewery which is a part of John Martin Brewery group.

== Beers ==
- Bourgogne des Flandres Brune is a special type of brown beer formed by mixed fermentation combining a selection of mixed lambic (spontaneous fermentation) and a brown beer of high fermentation and aged in oak barrels. In 2009, it was awarded with 3 stars by Superior Taste Award of the International Taste & Quality Institute, and in 2012 it won the bronze medal at the Brussels Beer Challenge in the category of Red Ale: Old Red (Flanders Red Ale)
- Bourgogne des Flandres Blonde is a light ale beer which is formed with high fermentation and it has strong bitterness, measuring 6% alcohol by volume.
