= Luizenmolen =

Replica windmill in Brussels, Belgium

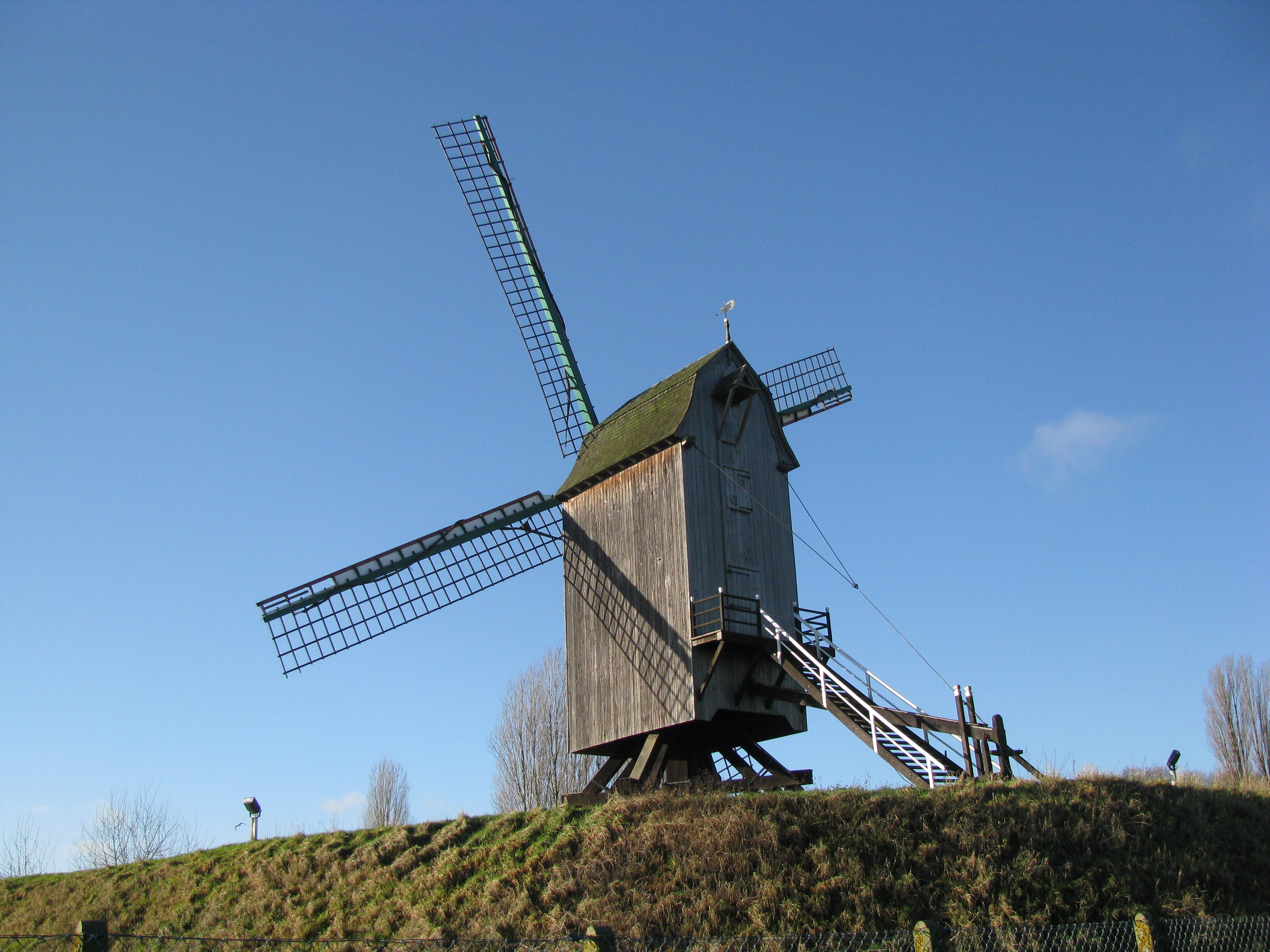
- The Luizenmolen in 2014
- Interactive map of Luizenmolen

Origin
- Mill location: Rue des Papillons / Vlindersstraat 192, 1070 Anderlecht, Brussels-Capital Region, Belgium
- Coordinates: 50°50′2.836″N 4°16′2.503″E
- Operator: Luizenmolen-Anderlecht
- Year built: 1864 (original)

Information
- Purpose: Gristmill
- Type: Post mill
- No. of sails: 4

The Luizenmolen (lit. 'Louse Mill') is a post mill in Anderlecht, a municipality of Brussels, Belgium. It is a fully functional windmill built in 1996 as a replica of an earlier mill erected on the same site in 1864. The reconstruction was initiated by a local heritage group concerned with preserving the district's rural history. The current structure was inaugurated in May 1999 and designated a protected monument in 2007.

The mill stands on an artificial hill along the Rue des Papillons/Vlindersstraat (lit. 'Butterfly Street') in Neerpede, approximately 30 metres (98 ft) from the site of the original mill, which was demolished in 1955. It remains in working order and is open to visitors.

== Toponymy ==
The name Luizenmolen originates from the former Luizenstraat (French: Rue aux Poux; lit. 'Louse Street') in Neerpede, where the original mill once stood. The toponym may derive from the Limburgish word Luys, meaning "meadow for mowing", though it is more likely linked to the presence of lousewort (Dutch: luizenkruid), a plant believed to spoil hay and spread lice among livestock. The term luis might also have referred to poor soil or even a personal name.

== History ==
=== First Luizenmolen (1864–1955) ===
The first Luizenmolen was built in 1864 behind the Vlasendael Farm in Neerpede. According to tradition, supported by certain structural features, the mill may have originated from another locality, though no written sources confirm this. The request to establish it dates from 1862, and relocating post mills was common practice.

In 1874, the mill was moved to an embankment beside the existing farmhouse, where the old mill mound remains visible today. Its first owner and builder was P.-J. Paridaens-Lindemans from Heikruis, likely a descendant of J.-B. Paridaens, a miller active there in 1807. Paridaens employed Staaf De Crem and his son Jef as millers. A valuation dated 1 December 1883 lists Henri Pierre Van Leeuw-Roelandts as tenant and likely miller, with three pairs of millstones installed inside.

P.-J. Paridaens died in April 1905, followed by his widow six months later. On 8 May 1906, the mill was sold at a public auction to its tenant-miller, Henri Pierre Van Leeuw-Roelandts. After his father's death in 1914, Jozef became the Luizenmolen's last miller, operating it with Staaf and Jef De Crem until 1928.

In 1939, the Van Leeuw-Roelandts family sold the disused mill to the municipality of Anderlecht, which, encouraged by the Royal Commission for Monuments and Landscapes and local art circles, drafted plans to restore the Luizenmolen and its surrounding valley. These efforts were interrupted by the outbreak of the Second World War, though correspondence between Anderlecht's chief engineer and mill expert Alfred Ronse, along with surviving restoration specifications, still exist. At the request of the Royal Commission, the Luizenmolen was listed as a protected monument in 1942. However, from 1943 onwards, and especially after the war, the mill was neglected and deteriorated rapidly. It was declassified in 1954 and ultimately demolished in February 1955 after years of decay.

=== Second Luizenmolen (1992–present) ===
By 1955, only drawings, paintings, a postcard, and a single German wheat millstone from the original Luizenmolen remained, with other relics preserved at the Beguinage of Anderlecht. A handful of local residents, unwilling to accept the loss of their mill, rallied around Éric Tomas, who would later become president of the Brussels Parliament. This led to the creation of the non-profit association Luizenmolen-Anderlecht in 1992, with the goal of reconstructing the mill.

The project, supported by the King Baudouin Foundation, was carried out near the old miller's house and historic mound, with plans by the architect Georges Piron and technical advice from Levende Molens. Millwrights Herman and Guido Peel executed the construction, including a new mound positioned a short distance from the original site. By May 1998, the mill body was placed on the pivot, which spent the winter without sails, and the fully operational Luizenmolen was inaugurated on 29 May 1999, marking the last windmill to be built in Belgium in the 20th century. The first volunteer millers were Jan Delcour, Eric Diederich, and Bruno Steinrück; by 2011, only Diederich remained active, later joined by Mohamed El Harchi and Willy Stas in 2013.

By decree of 8 February 2007, the Luizenmolen was listed as a protected monument for its historical, aesthetic, and ethnological value. Maintenance work has included subsidence repairs in 2009, replacement of oak foundation blocks in 2013, and reinforcement of cross plates in 2016, following concerns about structural stability. On 1 October 2016, the mill received the "Active Mill 2016" designation from Molenforum Vlaanderen, recognising its architectural quality, technical operation, and community involvement.

As of late 2023, the mill is temporarily out of operation due to urgent repairs to the sails and internal staircase, with a subsidy request submitted to the Brussels-Capital Region. While it can no longer produce saleable flour, the mill continues to host workshops and remains open to visitors.

== Description ==
The Luizenmolen is a post mill constructed primarily from oak, with red pine and cedar used for cladding and mechanical components. The mill body rotates around a central vertical post to face the wind, supported by four sets of diagonal braces resting on two horizontal cross plates mounted on four brick piers, with the taller piers traditionally aligned north–south. The mill weighs approximately 35 tonnes (77,000 lb).

The structure contains two floors: an upper stone floor and a lower flour floor. It has two pairs of millstones, each 1.2 metres (3.9 ft) in diameter, with the upper runner stones rotating and the lower bedstones remaining stationary. The sails are 12 metres (39 ft) long with a total span of 24.5 metres (80 ft), constructed with iron rods, wooden planks, and an oak lattice. The gabled roof and wind-facing walls are covered with cedar tiles. The mill was built using traditional methods that minimised the use of metal in its construction.

== Impact ==
Comics expert Pierre Borms has suggested that the windmill in the Spike and Suzy album The Spanish Ghost was inspired by the Luizenmolen. Willy Vandersteen based the story on Pieter Bruegel's The Peasant Wedding, transporting the characters to 16th-century Brabant. After escaping Gaasbeek Castle, they spend the night in a post mill resembling the Luizenmolen, notable for its high mansard roof. Nearby landmarks such as St. Anne's Church of Sint-Anna-Pede are depicted, and the scene ends with a church fire before the characters move to an inn in Anderlecht. Modern comparisons highlight a clear visual resemblance, supporting the mill's influence on the comic.

== See also ==
- History of Brussels
- Belgium in the long nineteenth century
