= John Martin Brewery =

Brewery in Belgium

John Martin is the name of a beer brewery in Genval (Walloon Brabant), Belgium, founded in 1909 by English businessman John Martin (1886-1966). A family company, it is currently run by his grandson, Anthony Martin. Besides brewing Belgian-style ales, the company also imports British and Irish beers, and produces soft drinks for Schweppes under license. It is the oldest Guinness distributor in the world.

In 1993 the company bought Timmermans Brewery, a lambic beer brewery from Itterbeek founded in 1702.

In 2015, the company opened the new Brasserie de Waterloo at Mont Saint Jean. In 2016, it opened the Bourgogne des Flandres brewery in Bruges.
