= Aarschotse Stadsbrouwerij =

Brewery located in Aarschot, Belgium

The Aarschotse Stadsbrouwerij ("Aarschot city brewery"), located in the city of Aarschot, Belgium, is an initiative of the city's governing body in collaboration with local brewing-enthusiasts.

== History and description ==
In 1989 the city decided to ensure that the Aarschotse Bruine, a typical Flemish Red-Brown beer of the wider Aarschot countryside, was being brewed again after the last local brewer ceased trading in 1969. Before that year many local brewers made the beer but take-overs and consolidation of the market caused them to cease brewing. In 2012 the city governors decided to support the initiative of the tourist board and make the barn of the culture centre Het Gasthuis available for conversion to a brewery.

The local beer- and wine-making guild Bier- en wijngilde ‘t Alternatief and De Aarschotse Bierwegers revived the taste, the brewing process and the production of the beer. Product development has successfully revived the Forto (blond) and Duc (dark) beers.

Visitors can follow the brewing process in the city brewery and taste the product in the " 't Bruine Café" .

== Products ==
Beers produced by the Aarschotse Stadsbrouwerij :

- Aarschotse Bruine
- Aarschotse Duc
- Aarschotse Forto
- Gasthuis Tripel

== Printed sources ==
- Alle Belgische Bieren, ed. Hilde Deweer, Stichting Kunstboek Oostkamp, 2015 ISBN 978-90-5856-526-6
