= Duchesse de Bourgogne =

Brand of Belgian beer

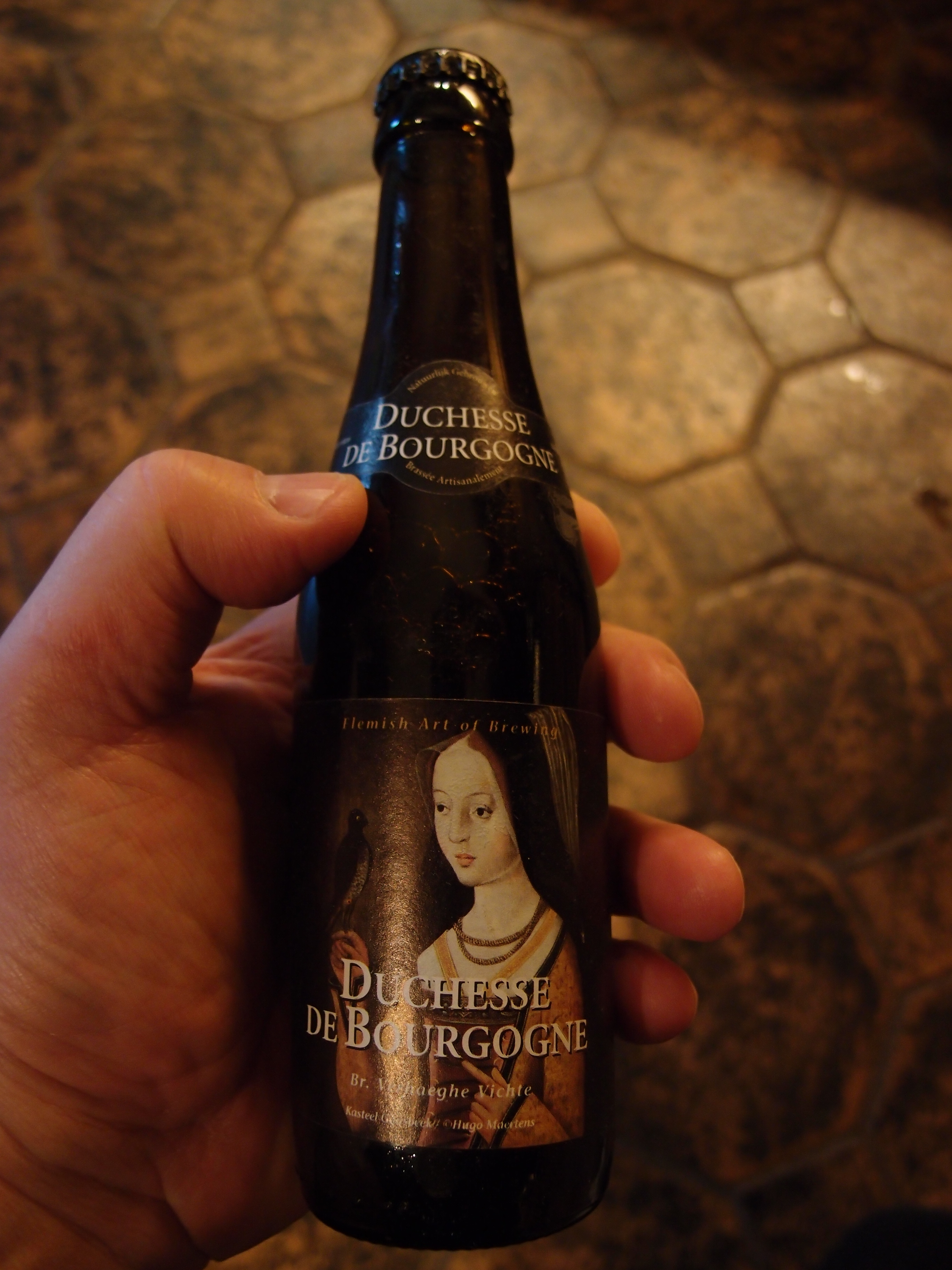
Beer Duchesse de Bourgogne.

Duchesse de Bourgogne (pronounced [dyʃɛs də buʁɡɔɲ]; French for 'Duchess of Burgundy') is a Flanders red ale-style beer produced by Brouwerij Verhaeghe in Vichte, Belgium. After a primary and secondary fermentation, this ale is matured in oak barrels for 18 months. The final product is a blend of a younger 8-month-old beer with an 18-month-old beer, it has an alcohol percentage of 6.2%.

The name of the beer is meant to honour Duchess Mary of Burgundy, the only daughter of Charles the Bold, who was born in Brussels in 1457 and died in a horse riding accident in 1482. Like all Flemish red ales, Duchesse de Bourgogne has a characteristically sour, fruity flavour similar to that of lambic beers.
