= The blind leading the blind =

Idiom and metaphor in the form of a parallel phrase

"The blind leading the blind" is an idiom and a metaphor. It describes a situation where a person ignorant of a given subject gets advice and help from someone just as ignorant.

== History ==
The idiom can be traced back to the Upanishads, which were written around 800 BCE:

Abiding in the midst of ignorance, thinking themselves wise and learned, fools go aimlessly hither and thither, like the blind led by the blind.

— Katha Upanishad

A similar metaphor exists in the Buddhist Pali Canon, composed in North India, and preserved orally until it was committed to writing during the Fourth Buddhist Council in Sri Lanka in 29 BCE:

Suppose there were a row of blind men, each holding on to the one in front of him: the first one doesn't see, the middle one doesn't see, the last one doesn't see. In the same way, the statement of the Brahmans turns out to be a row of blind men, as it were: the first one doesn't see, the middle one doesn't see, the last one doesn't see.

— Canki Sutta (MN 95)

A similar expression appears in Horace (Epistles, book I, epistle XVII, line 4): caecus iter monstrare uelit ("the blind wishing to show the way"). Horace was the leading Roman lyric poet during the time of Augustus (27 BCE – 14 CE).

The phrase also features in the New Testament. It is mentioned several times in the gospels, with similar stories appearing in Matthew, Luke and the non-canonical gospel of Thomas. It possibly reached the evangelists via the hypothesised Q source.

"Every plant that my heavenly Father has not planted will be pulled up by the roots. Leave them; they are blind guides [of the blind]. If a blind man leads a blind man, both will fall into a pit."

— Matthew 15:13-14

Sextus Empiricus (160 – 210 CE) compares ignorant teachers and blind guides in his Outlines of Scepticism:

"Nor does the non-expert teach the non-expert—any more than the blind can lead the blind."

The phrase appears in Adagia, an annotated collection of Greek and Latin proverbs compiled during the Renaissance by Dutch humanist Desiderius Erasmus Roterodamus. The first edition, Collectanea Adagiorum, was published in Paris in 1500 CE.

Augustine of Hippo, a Catholic theologian, writes ″Vae caecis ducentibus! Vae caecis sequentibus!,″ Latin for, "woe to the blind that lead, woe to the blind that follow."

== Artistic depictions ==
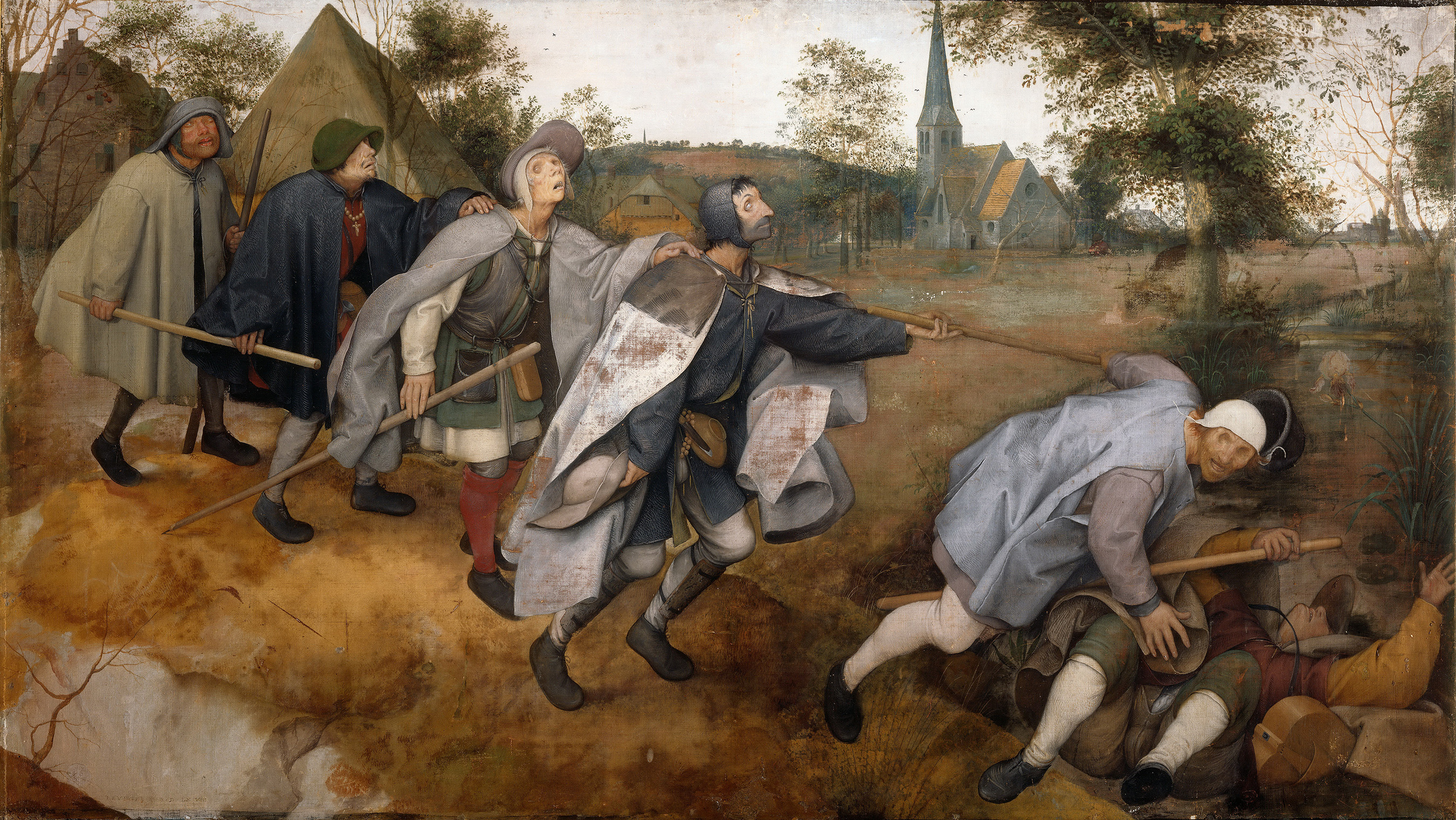
The Blind Leading the Blind by Pieter Bruegel the Elder, 1568

Perhaps the most famous artistic depiction of the phrase is Pieter Bruegel's The Blind Leading the Blind. The distemper on canvas painting was completed in 1568 and is currently in the collection of the Museo di Capodimonte in Naples, Italy.
