= The Parable of the Blind =

Painting by Pieter Bruegel the Elder

The Blind Leading the Blind
- De parabel der blinden (Dutch)
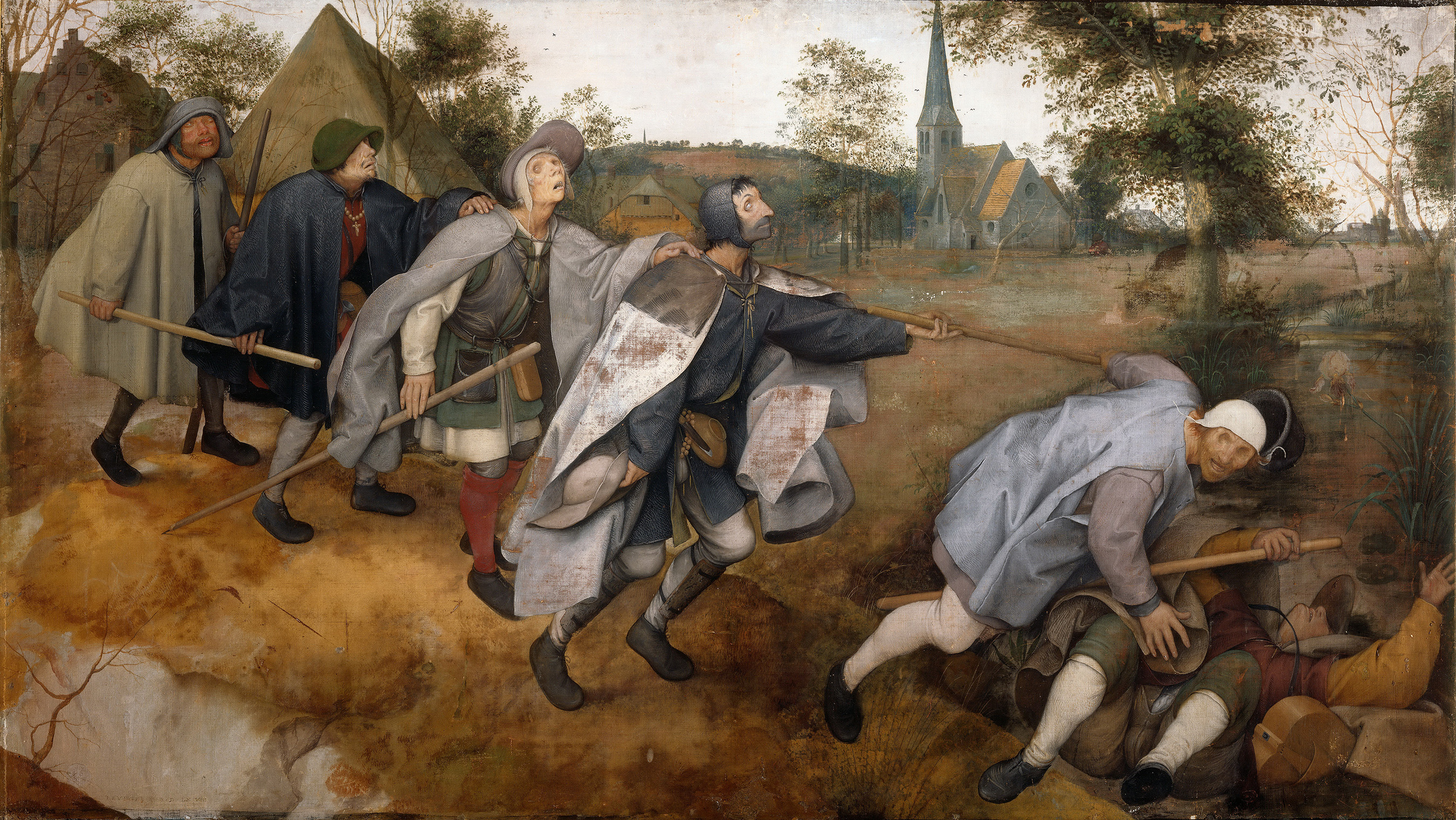
- Artist: Pieter Bruegel the Elder
- Year: 1568
- Type: Distemper on linen canvas
- Dimensions: 86 cm × 154 cm (34 in × 61 in)
- Location: Museo di Capodimonte, Naples

The Blind Leading the Blind, Blind, or The Parable of the Blind (Dutch: De parabel der blinden) is a painting by the Netherlandish Renaissance artist Pieter Bruegel the Elder, completed in 1568. Executed in distemper on linen canvas, it measures 86 cm × 154 cm (34 in × 61 in). It depicts the Biblical parable of the blind leading the blind from Matthew 15:14, and is in the collection of the Museo di Capodimonte in Naples, Italy.

The painting reflects Bruegel's mastery of observation. Each figure has a different eye affliction, including corneal leukoma, atrophy of globe and removed eyes. The men hold their heads aloft to make better use of their other senses. The diagonal composition reinforces the off-kilter motion of the six figures falling in progression. It is considered a masterwork for its accurate detail and composition. Copies include a larger version by Bruegel's son Pieter Brueghel the Younger, and the work has inspired literature such as poetry by Charles Baudelaire and William Carlos Williams, and a novel by Gert Hofmann.

Bruegel painted The Blind the year before his death. It has a bitter, sorrowful tone, which may be related to the establishment of the Council of Troubles in 1567 by the government of the Spanish Netherlands. The council ordered mass arrests and executions to enforce Spanish rule and suppress Protestantism. The placement of St. Anna's Church of the village of Sint-Anna-Pede has led to both pro- and anti-Catholic interpretations, though it is not clear that the painting was meant as a political statement.

== Description ==
The painting depicts a procession of six blind, disfigured men. They pass along a path bordered by a river on one side and a village with a church on the other. The leader of the group has fallen on his back into a ditch and, because they are all linked by their staffs, seems about to drag his companions down with him. A cowherd stands in the background.

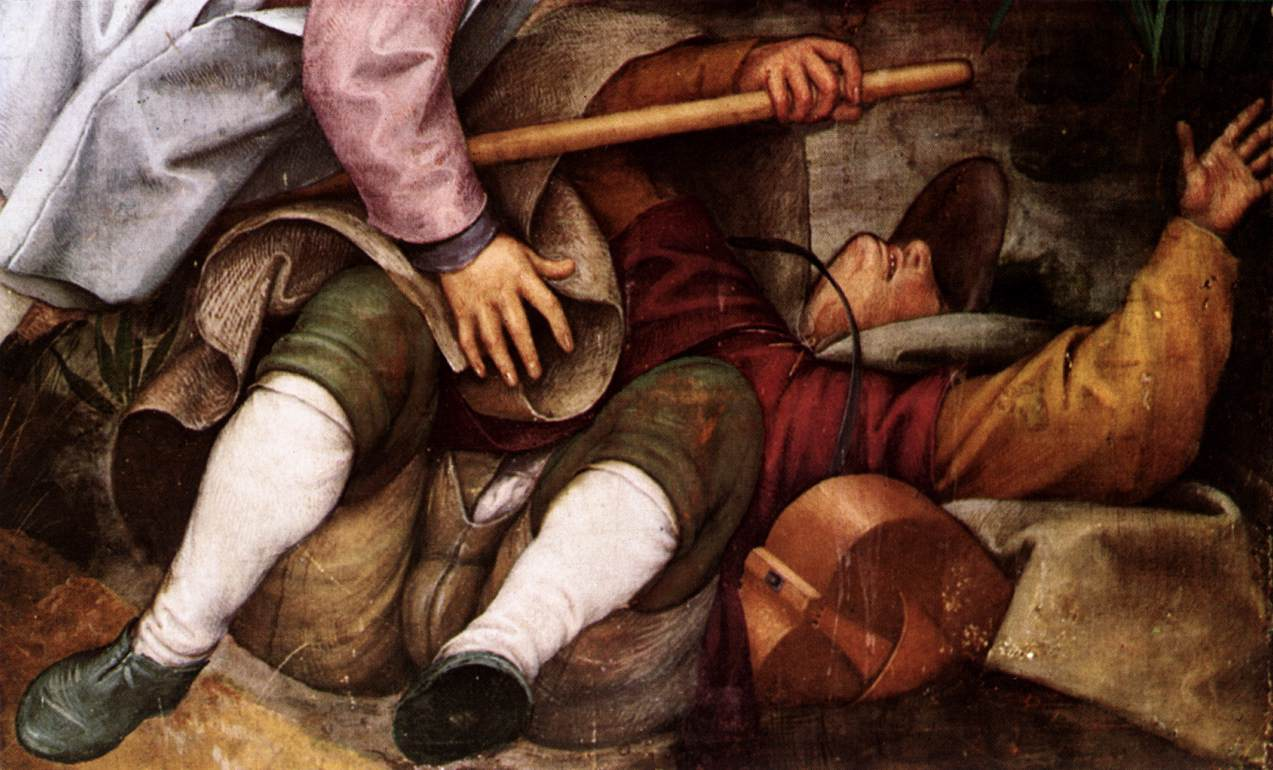
Bruegel demonstrates mastery of foreshortening in depicting the leader of the blind men.

Bruegel based the work on the Biblical parable of the blind leading the blind from Matthew 15:14, (Note: Matthew 15:14) in which Christ refers to the Pharisees. According to art critic Margaret Sullivan, Bruegel's audience was likely as familiar with classical literature as with the Bible. Erasmus had published his Adagia two years before Bruegel's painting, and it contained the quotation "Caecus caeco dux" ("the blind leader of the blind") by Roman poet Horace. Bruegel expands the two blind men in the parable to six; they are well dressed, rather than wearing the peasant clothing that typifies his late work. The first blind man's face is not visible; the second twists his head as he falls, perhaps to avoid landing face-first. The shinguard-clad third man, on his toes with knees bent and face to the sky, shares a staff with the second, by which he is being pulled down. The others have yet to stumble, but the same fate seems implied.

The faces and bodies of the blind men, and background detail including the church, are rendered in exceptionally fine detail. The backward-falling posture of the guide demonstrates Bruegel's mastery of foreshortening. Bruegel's settings tend to be fictional, (Note: Of Bruegel's oeuvre only the Naval Battle in the Gulf of Naples (1560) also has an identifiable setting.) but that of The Blind Leading the Blind has been identified as the village of Sint-Anna-Pede, and the church as St. Anna's Church.

=== Style ===
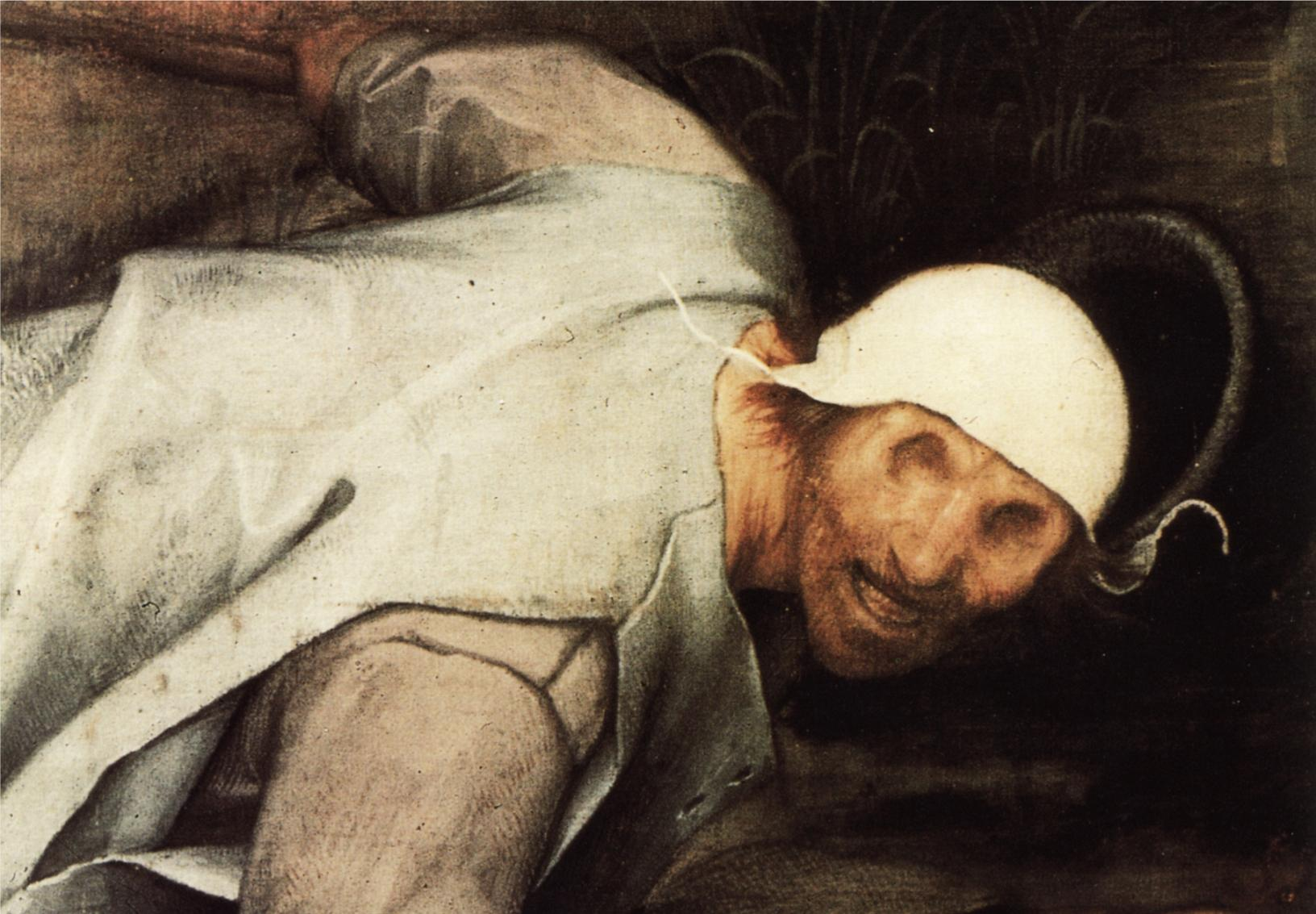
Detail of the second blind man falling. Ophthalmologists have determined his eyes have been removed.

One of four surviving Bruegel paintings in distemper, (Note: The others are The Adoration of the Kings (1564), The Misanthrope (1568) and the recently-attributed Wine of Saint Martin's Day.) the work is a tüchlein, a type of light painting that uses tempera made from pigment mixed with water-soluble glue. This medium was widely used in painting and manuscript illumination before the advent of oil paint. It is not known from whom Bruegel learnt its use, but amongst those speculated are his mother-in-law, illuminator Mayken Verhulst; his teacher Pieter Coecke van Aelst; and painter and illuminator Giulio Clovio, with whom he resided in Italy and whom he helped paint miniatures in distemper. Due to the high perishability of linen cloth and the solubility of hide glue, tüchleins do not preserve well and are difficult to restore. The Blind Leading the Blind is in good condition and has suffered no more than some erosion, such as of a herdsman and some fowl in the middle ground. (Note: The herdsman can be seen in later derivative paintings, such as the one by Pieter Brueghel the Younger.) The grain of the linen canvas is visible beneath the delicate brushstrokes. The work is signed and dated BRVEGEL.M.D.LX.VIII. The painting measures 86 cm × 154 cm (34 in × 61 in), the largest of 1568.

The austere tone is achieved through pigments in a colour scheme of mostly greys, greens, brownish-reds, and blacks. The diagonal movement of the bodies creates a dramatic tension in the foreground which is divided diagonally from the landscape background. The flat country features are distinctly Flemish, unlike in most of Bruegel's landscapes, in which he introduced foreign elements such as mountain ranges even into local scenery.

In contrast to earlier depictions of the blind as beneficiaries of divine gifts, Bruegel's men are stumbling and decrepit, and portrayed without sympathy. The eyeless figure would have been interpreted as a man who had suffered punishment for wrongdoing or fighting.

Bruegel painted with the empirical objectivity of the Renaissance. In earlier paintings the blind were typically depicted with eyes closed. Here, Bruegel gives each man a different ocular affliction, all painted with a realism that allowed identification of their conditions by later experts, though there is still some diagnostic disagreement. French anatomical pathologist Jean-Martin Charcot and anatomical artist Paul Richer published an early account, Les difformes et les malades dans l'art ("The deformed and sick in art", 1889), and French pathologist Tony-Michel Torrillhon followed with more research on Bruegel's figures in 1957. The first man's eyes are not visible; the second has had his eyes removed, along with the eyelids: the third suffers from corneal leukoma; the fourth atrophy of the globe; the fifth is either blind with no light perception, or photophobic; and the sixth has pemphigus or bullous pemphigoid. Charcot and Richer noted Bruegel's accuracy in portraying the blind men facing not forward but with their faces raised in the air, as they would have had to rely on their senses of smell and hearing.

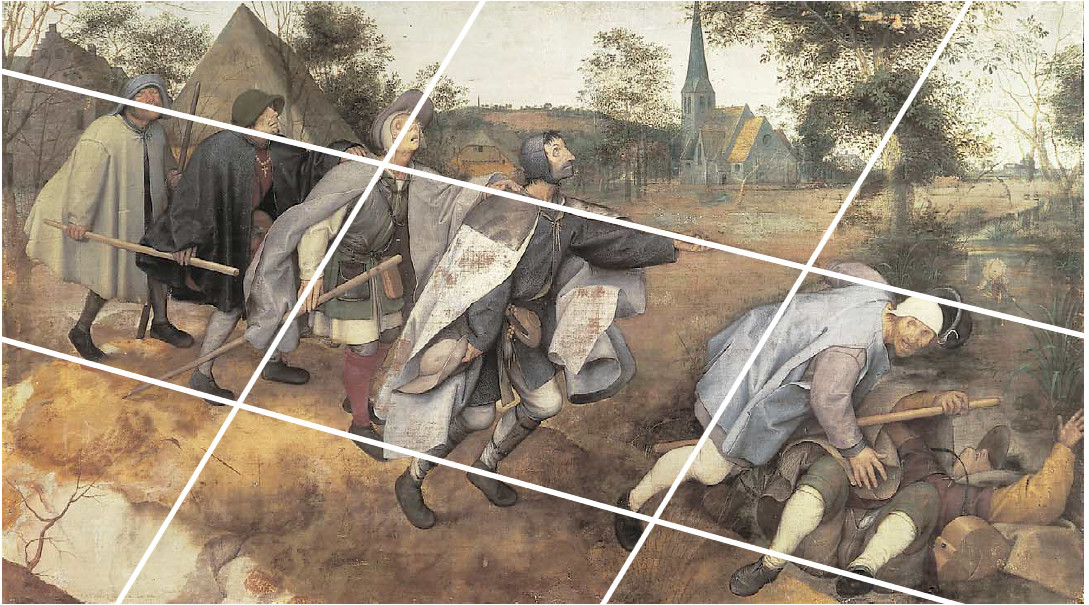
The diagonal composition creates tension and gives a sense of movement.

== Background ==
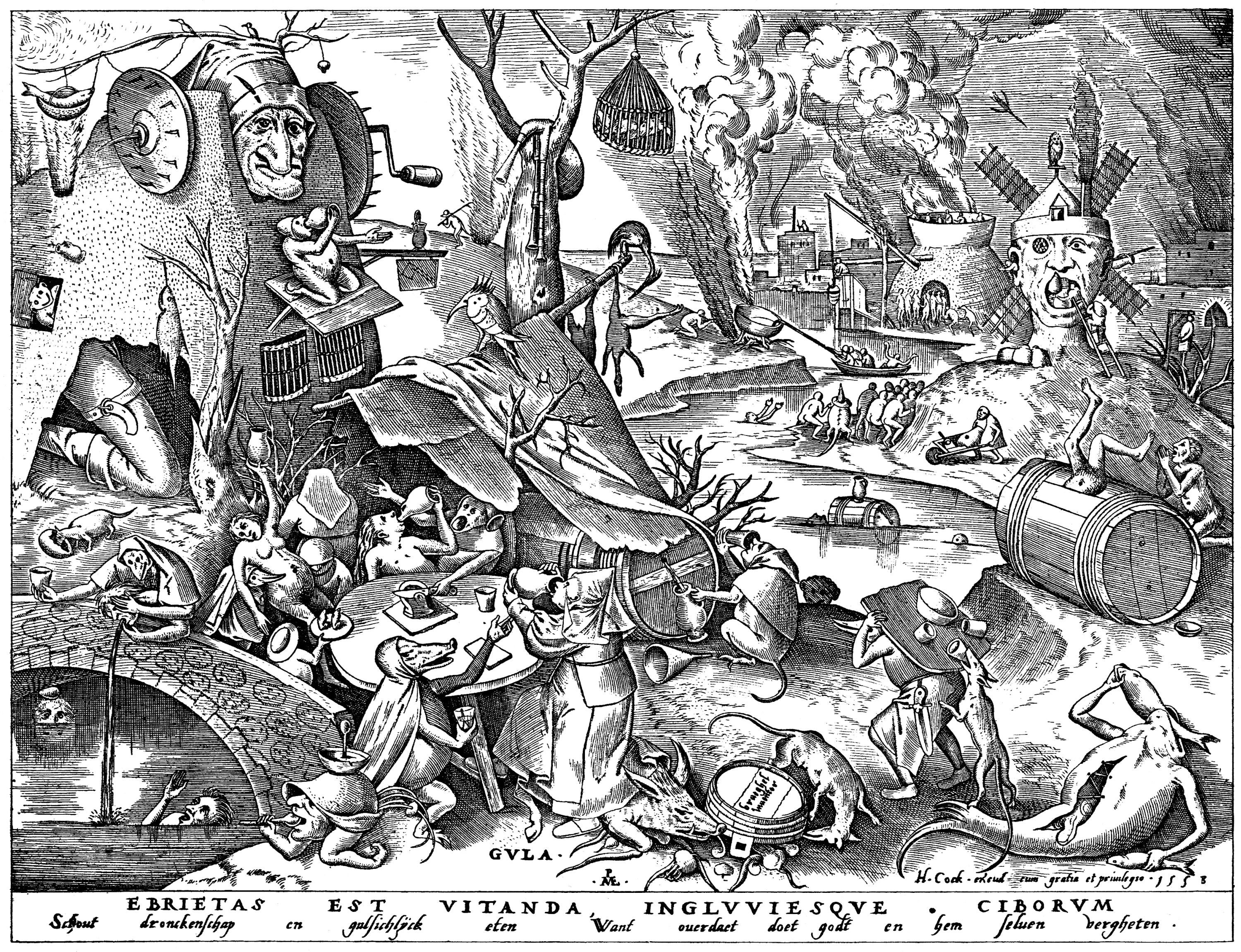
Gluttony, Bruegel, 1558. This early work follows the busy, fantastical work of Bosch.

Sixteenth-century Europe was undergoing many societal changes: the Protestant Reformation and its rejection of public religious imagery; Renaissance humanism and its emphasis on empiricism at the expense of religious faith; and the growth of the middle class amidst the rise of mercantilism. It was a time of rapid advances in learning and knowledge, and a move towards the empirical sciences—the age of the heliocentric theory of Copernicus and of Gutenberg's printing presses. The cartography of Ortelius influenced the painting of landscapes, and the advances Vesalius brought to the study of anatomy via the direct observation of dissected bodies, motivated artists to pay greater attention to the accuracy of the anatomy in their works.

Art was now traded in open markets; artists sought to distinguish themselves with subjects different from traditional noble, mythological, and Biblical ones, and developed new, realistic techniques based on empirical observation. Classical literature provided precedents for dealing with "low" subjects in art. Genre art and its depiction of ordinary people and everyday life emerged against this background.

Pieter Bruegel the Elder began his career illustrating landscapes and fantastic scenes in a dense style that earned him a reputation as artistic heir to Hieronymus Bosch. He soon came to follow the example of another master, Pieter Aertsen, who had made a name for himself in the 1550s depicting everyday scenes in a highly realistic style, such as the detailed array of meat products that dominate his large Butcher's Stall of 1551. Bruegel's subjects became more quotidian and his style observational. He achieved fame for detailed, accurate and realistic portrayals of peasants, with whom his paintings were popular. He painted on linen canvas and oak panel, and avoided scenes of magnificence and portraits of nobility or royalty. The peasants Bruegel at first depicted were featureless and undifferentiated; as his work matured, their physiognomy became markedly more detailed and expressive.

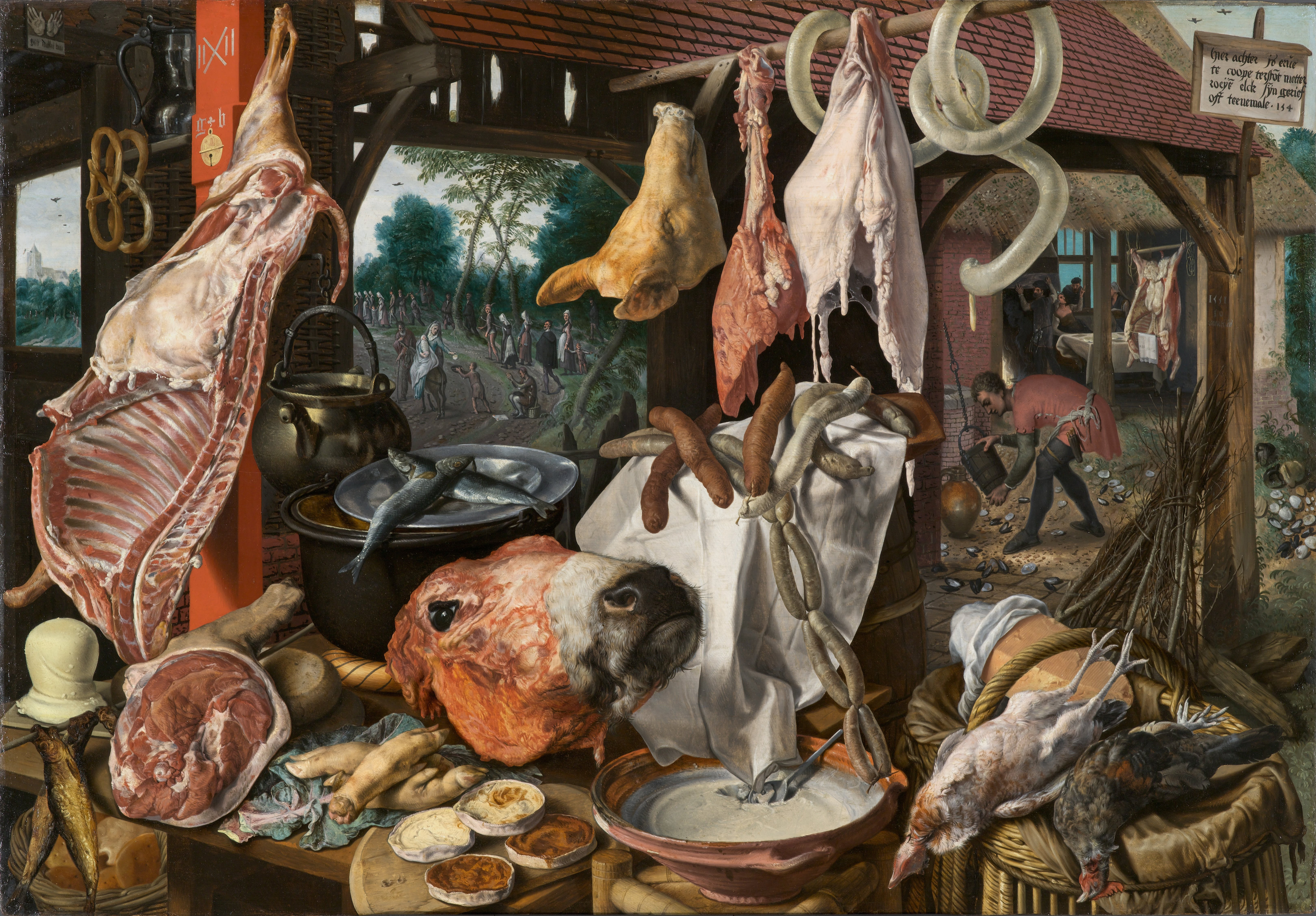
Pieter Aertsen pioneered painting the quotidian. A Meat Stall with the Holy Family Giving Alms, Aertsen, 1551

In 1563, Bruegel married Mayken, the daughter of his teacher Pieter Coecke van Aelst, and moved to Brussels, the seat of government in the Spanish Netherlands (1556–1714). In 1567 the governor of the Netherlands, the Duke of Alba, established the Council of Troubles (popularly called the "Blood Council") to suppress non-Catholic religions and enforce Spanish rule, leading to mass arrests and executions. Whether Bruegel had Calvinist sympathies or intended a political message in The Blind is not clear, but the evidence indicates he likely held views critical of the Catholic Church. A bitter, sorrowful tone characterizes his last works, such as The Blind and The Magpie on the Gallows.

In ancient Greece the blind were depicted as having received gifts from the gods, and blind singers were held in high regard. In mediaeval Europe, the blind were depicted as the subjects of miracles, such as Bartimaeus in the healing the blind near Jericho in Mark 10:46–52. (Note: Mark 15:46) Following the Reformation, painted depictions of saints and miracles fell out of favour in Protestant areas. In Catholic thought, charitable works of mercy, such as giving alms to the blind and poor, were good works which, together with faith, helped the salvation of the doer. However, the Protestant doctrine of sola fide rejected the efficacy of works in achieving salvation, prescribing that it depended on faith alone (and the complication of God's predestined will for each individual). The status of charity for the poor and infirm diminished, and beggars saw their circumstances deteriorate. In popular literature of the time, the blind were depicted as rogues or targets of pranks. The parable of the blind leading the blind also appears as one of the illustrated proverbs in Bruegel's Netherlandish Proverbs (1559). (Note: The proverb in Dutch is: "Als de ene blinde de andere leidt, vallen ze beiden in de gracht." (English: "When one blind man leads another, they both fall into the ditch."))

== Analysis ==
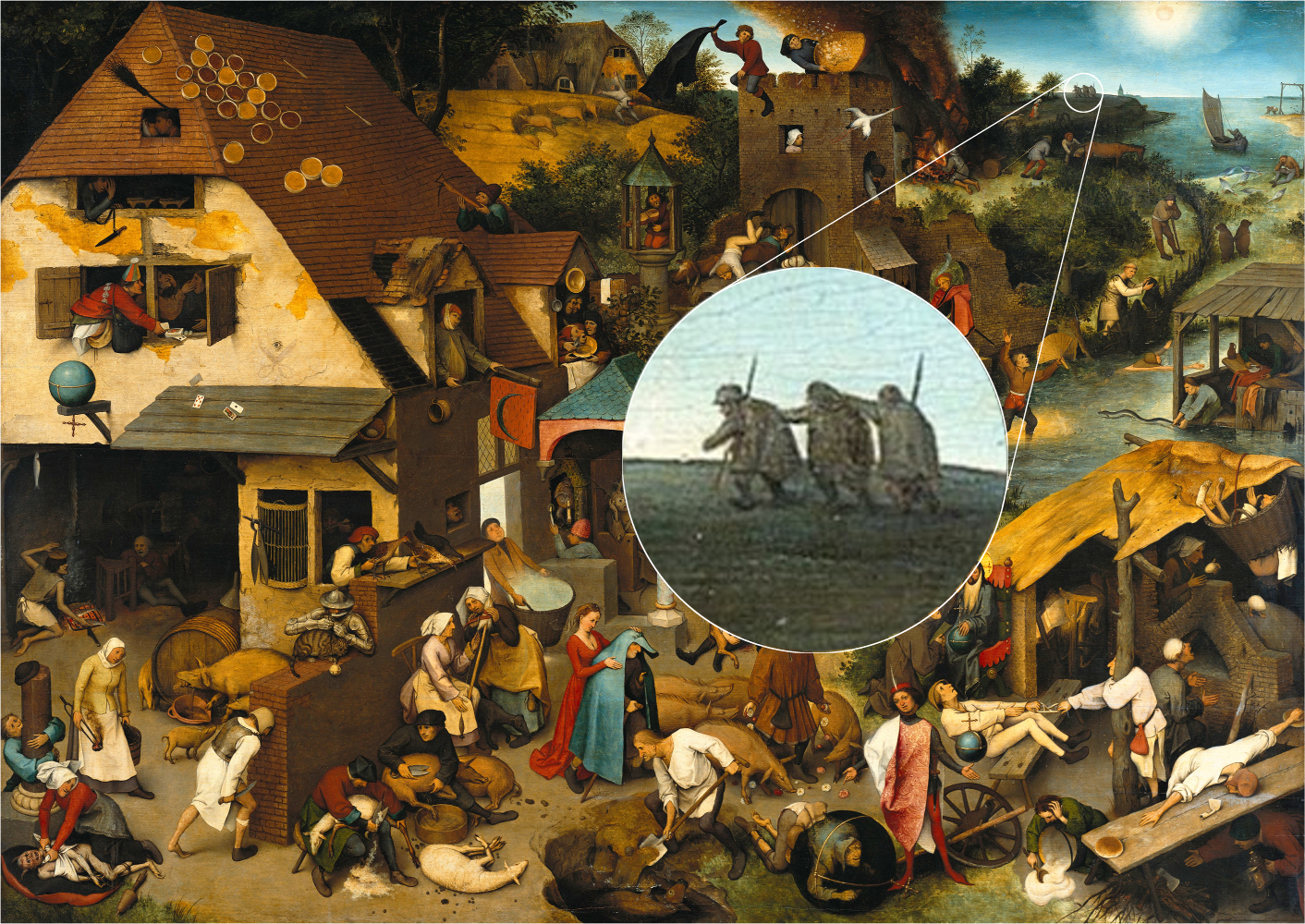
Bruegel earlier depicted the blind leading the blind (inset) in Netherlandish Proverbs (1559).

Charles Bouleau wrote of the tension in Bruegel's compositional rhythms. The picture is divided into nine equal parts divided by a set of parallel oblique lines. These are divided by another network of lines at constant angles to the first. The composition invites the reader to follow the action rather than dwell on the individual figures. The blind men resemble each other in dress and facial features, and they appear as if they succeed one another in a single movement culminating in a fall, beginning on the left with "rambling, then hesitation, alarm, stumbling, and finally falling". The succession of heads follows a curve, and the further the succession, the greater the space between heads, suggesting increasing speed. The steep roofs of the background houses contribute to the composition's feeling of motion.

Art historian Gustav Glück noted incongruities in that the beggars are well-dressed and carry staves and full purses. Academics Kenneth C. Lindsay and Bernard Huppé suggest Bruegel may have implied that the blind men represent false priests who ignored Christ's admonitions not to carry gold, purses, or staves; (Note: Matthew 10:10) the leader carries a hurdy-gurdy, a musical instrument associated with beggars in Bruegel's time; this perhaps implies a false minstrel, one who sings praises not for God.

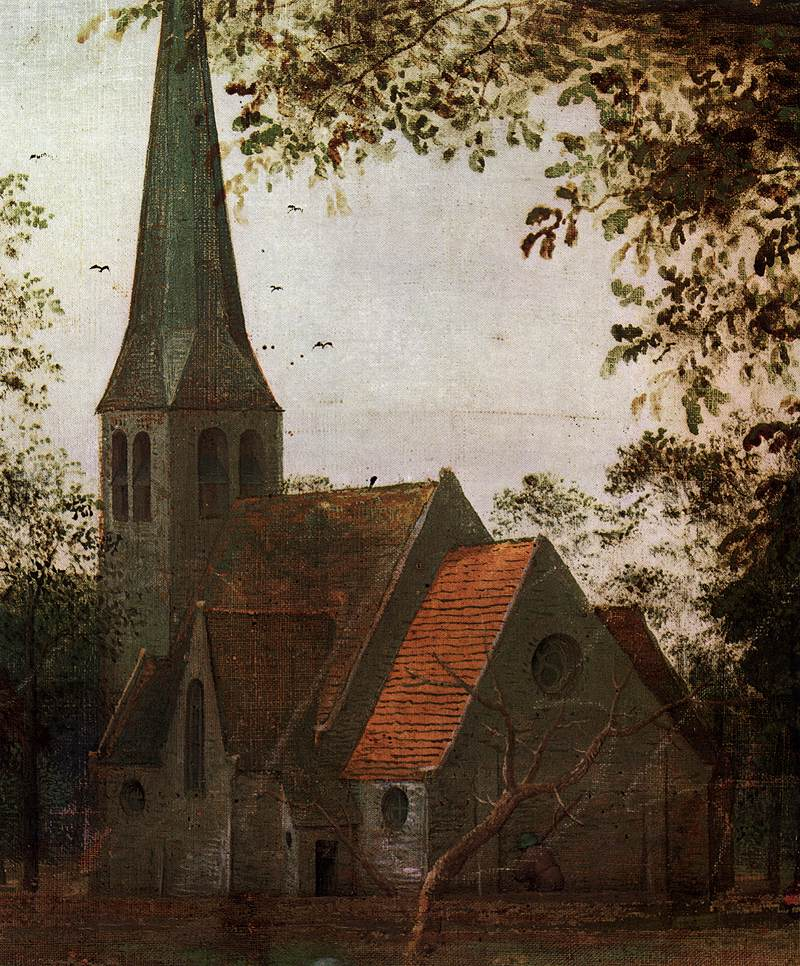
St. Anna's Church in the village of Sint-Anna-Pede. The inclusion of the church has led to conflicting interpretations of the painting.

The church in the background, identified as St. Anna's Church at Dilbeek in modern Belgium, has sparked much commentary. One view holds that the church is evidence of the painting's moralistic intent—that while the first two blind men stumble and are beyond redemption, the other four are behind the church and thus may be saved. Another interpretation has it that the church, with a withered tree placed before it, is an anti-Catholic symbol, and that those who follow it will fall following a blind leader as do the men in the ditch. Others deny any symbolism in the church, noting that churches frequently appear in Bruegel's village scenes as they were a common part of the village landscape. Medical researcher Zeynel A. Karcioglu suggests the church represents indifference to the plight of the handicapped.

In contrast to the posed, static figures typical of paintings of the period, Bruegel suggests the trajectory of time and space through the accelerated movement of the figures. Critics Charcot and Richer wrote that the concept of visualizing movement was not formulated until the 17th century, and that Bruegel prefigures motion pictures and Duchamp's Nude Descending a Staircase, No. 2. Karcioglu sees the painting as anticipating the 19th-century chronophotography of Étienne-Jules Marey. Dutch film director Joris Ivens stated, "If Bruegel were alive today he would be a film director."

== Legacy ==
The Blind Leading the Blind has been considered one of the great masterpieces of painting. Bruegel's is the earliest surviving painting whose subject is the parable of the blind leading the blind, though there are earlier engravings from the Low Countries known that Bruegel was likely aware of, including one attributed to Bosch, and another by Cornelis Massijs. Bruegel's paintings have enjoyed worldwide popularity and have been the subjects of scholarly works in disciplines even outside the arts, such as medicine.

Bruegel's depictions of beggars in paintings such as The Blind Leading the Blind left a strong influence on those who followed him, such as David Vinckboons. Hieronymus Wierix incorporated a copy of The Blind Leading the Blind into the series Twelve Flemish Proverbs. A forgery attributed to Jacob Savery called The Blind appeared c. 1600 bearing a false inscription dating it 1562. Bruegel's son Pieter Brueghel the Younger painted a larger copy in c. 1616 with extra details, including a flock of sheep, that hangs in the Louvre; this copy was in the collection of Ferdinando Gonzaga, Duke of Mantua, patron of Italian Baroque painter Domenico Fetti, who may have been influenced by the painting when he executed his own version of the parable around 1621–22.

Paintings inspired by Bruegel's The Blind Leading the Blind

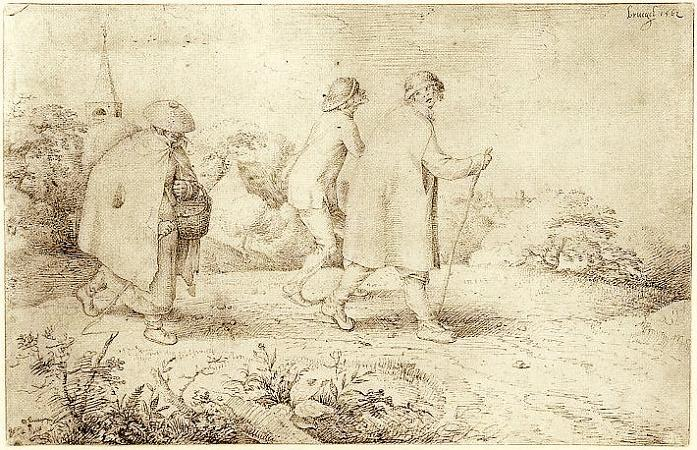
Forgery attributed to Jacob Savery, c. 1600

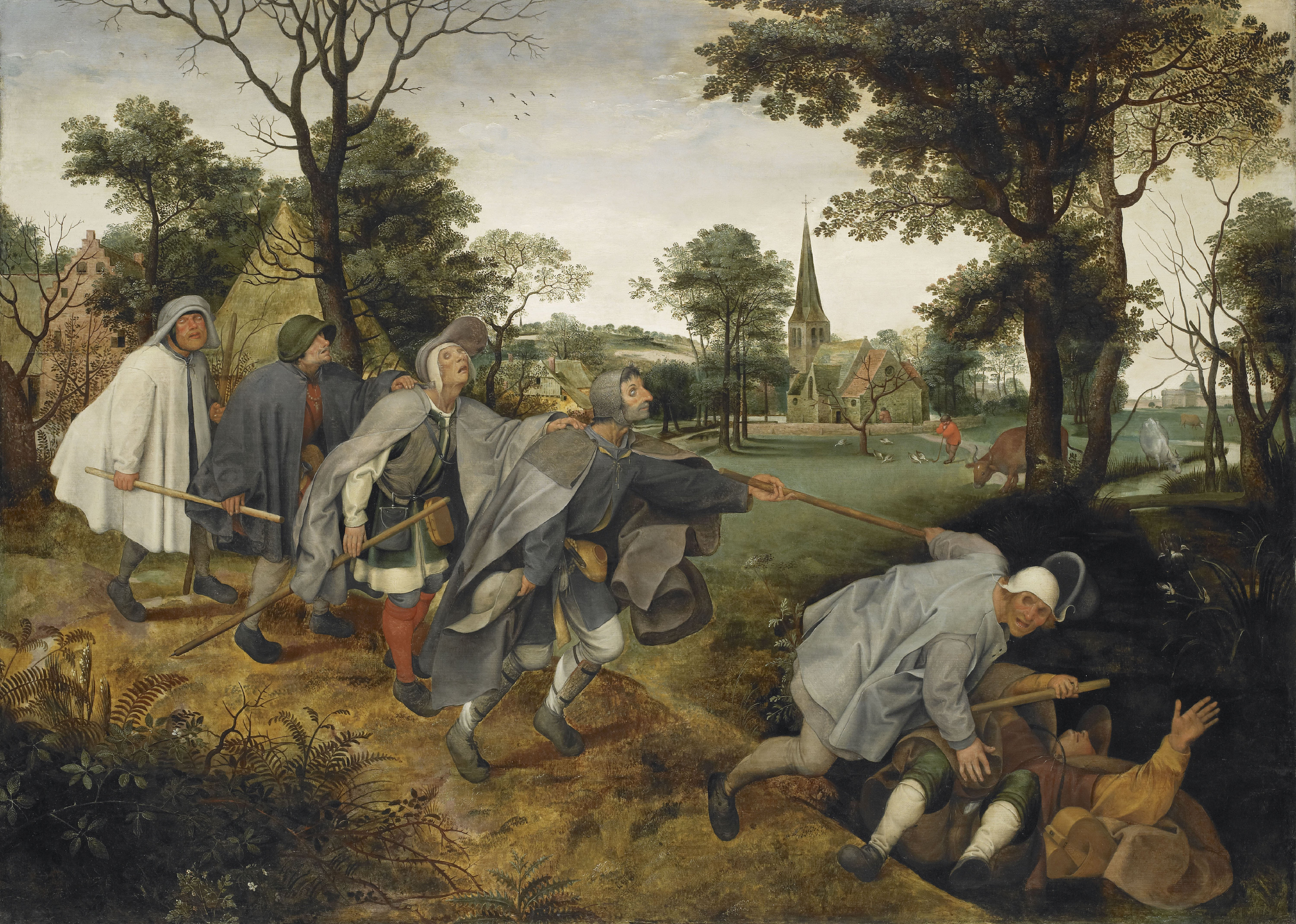
A copy by the school of Pieter Brueghel the Elder,

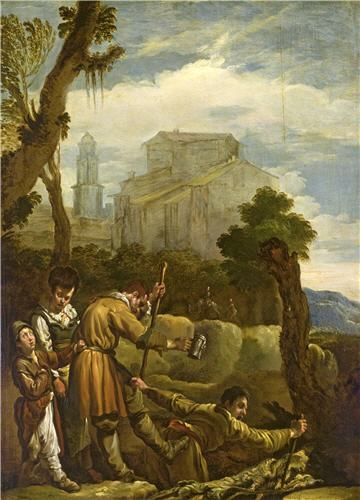
Domenico Fetti, c. 1621–22

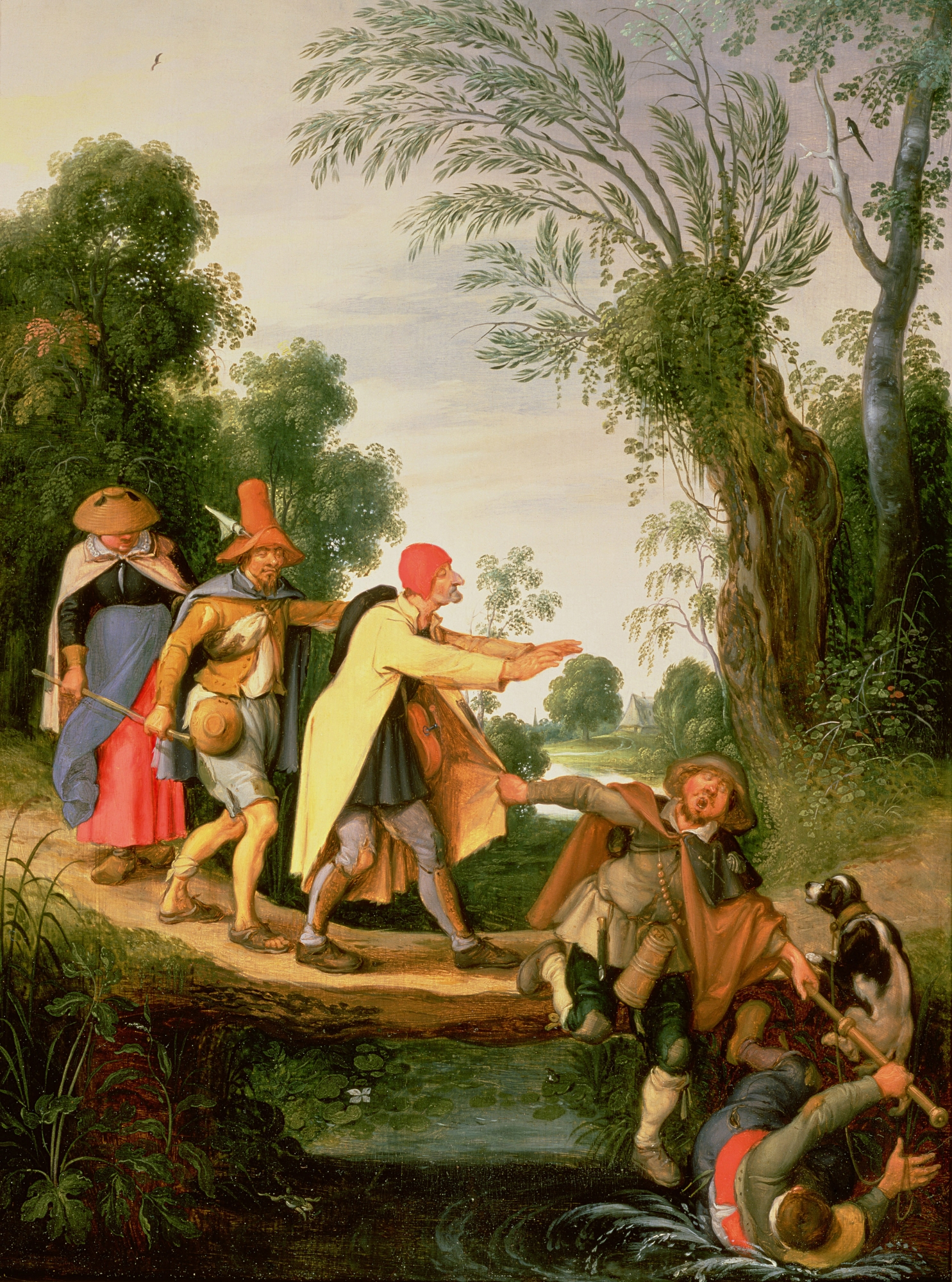
Sebastian Vrancx, early 17th century

Gassed, 1919, by John Singer Sargent

The painting has been the subject of poetry, including works by the Germans Josef Weinheber and Walter Bauer, and Frenchman Charles Baudelaire's "The Blind". (Note: "Les Aveugles" Contemple-les, mon âme; ils sont vraiment affreux! Pareils aux mannequins; vaguement ridicules; Terribles, singuliers comme les somnambules; Dardant on ne sait où leurs globes ténébreux. Leurs yeux, d'où la divine étincelle est partie, Comme s'ils regardaient au loin, restent levés Au ciel; on ne les voit jamais vers les pavés Pencher rêveusement leur tête appesantie. Ils traversent ainsi le noir illimité, Ce frère du silence éternel. Ô cité! Pendant qu'autour de nous tu chantes, ris et beugles, Eprise du plaisir jusqu'à l'atrocité, Vois! je me traîne aussi! mais, plus qu'eux hébété, Je dis: Que cherchent-ils au Ciel, tous ces aveugles? —Charles Baudelaire, Les Fleurs du mal (1861 edition)) American William Carlos Williams wrote a series of poems on Bruegel's paintings; his "Parable of the Blind" focuses on the meaning of The Blind's composition—a word that appears three times in the poems eight tercets. The figures stumble diagonally downward, and—

... one
follows the other stick in
hand triumphant to disaster

— William Carlos Williams, "Parable of the Blind", Pictures from Brueghel (1962)

Bruegel's painting served as a model for Belgian playwright Maurice Maeterlinck's one-act The Blind. West German writer Gert Hofmann's 1985 novel The Parable of the Blind features Bruegel and the six blind men: to accomplish a realistic portrayal, Bruegel repeatedly has the men cross a bridge and fall into a creek in midwinter until their expressions achieve the desolation Bruegel believes represents the human condition. A 1987 historical novel Bruegel, or the Workshop of Dreams by Claude-Henri Rocquet has Bruegel painting the blind out of fear of losing his own eyesight.

French cartoonist F'Murr's comic strip Les Aveugles (1991) was inspired by Bruegel's painting.

== Provenance ==
The Blind Leading the Blind and The Misanthrope were discovered in the collection of the Count Giovanni Battista Masi of Parma in 1612, when Ranuccio I Farnese, Duke of Parma confiscated Masi's property for his part in a conspiracy against the House of Farnese. How the painting arrived in Italy is uncertain, though it is known that Masi's father Cosimo returned from the Netherlands in 1595 with a number of Netherlandish paintings. The Farnese art collection came to be one of the largest of the Renaissance era, divided amongst the Farnese residences in Parma and Rome.

In the 18th century, Charles III of Spain inherited the collection from his mother, Elisabeth Farnese, heiress of the Duchy of Parma in north Italy, who became Queen consort of Spain. As a younger son, Charles had been made Duke of Parma, then boldly seized the Kingdom of Naples, becoming Charles VII of Naples, before inheriting the Spanish throne. Charles housed the collection in what is now the National Museum of Capodimonte in Naples. The painting hangs in the Capodimonte with The Misanthrope, as part of the Farnese collection.

== See also ==
- List of paintings by Pieter Bruegel the Elder
