= Vichte =

Coordinates: 50°50′N 3°24′E

Vichte (Dutch pronunciation: [ˈvɪxtə]) is a village in the municipality of Anzegem, in the south of West Flanders, Flanders, Belgium. It has 4,345 inhabitants (2004). Small, densely populated village with an important textile industry. Famous for its 12th century Roman Catholic church (now serving as a cultural centre) and its privately owned castle. It is also the location of Brewery Verhaeghe, well known for its Flemish red ales.

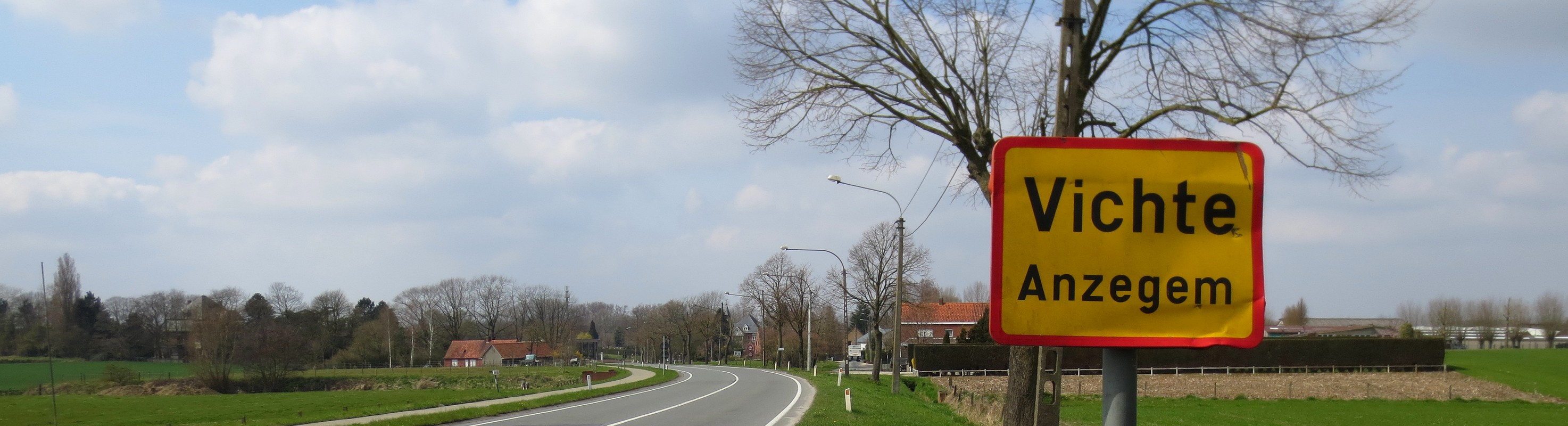
Vichte
