= Itterbeek =

Village in Dilbeek, Belgium

Coordinates: 50°50′22″N 4°15′00″E

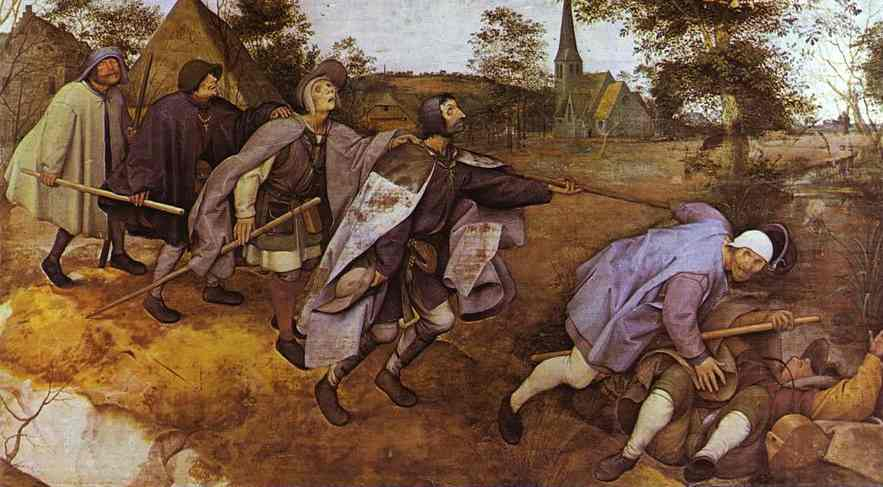
The Blind Leading the Blind by Pieter Brueghel the elder, with the church of Sint-Anna-Pede

Itterbeek is a historical village in the province of Flemish Brabant, Belgium, and since 1977 a submunicipality of Dilbeek.

== Toponymy ==
The village derives its name from the Indo-European words 'eud-' (water) en 'baki' (stream). One of the first mentions dates back to the 12th century, as Itrebecche. In 1176 the village was mentioned as Itterbecca.

== History ==
Itterbeek used to be part of the allodium of Sint-Pieters-Leeuw. During the 9th century, it became subject to the chapter of Cologne. Itterbeek gained some importance in the 13th century when the area, despite the presence of vassals of the family van der Aa, came under the power of Gaasbeek and formed the so-called Nieuw Land van Gaasbeek together with Dilbeek and Sint-Martens-Bodegem. Judicial power was exercised by a bench of aldermen.

Around 1244, Itterbeek became a separate parish, as part of the diocese of Cambrai. The oldest seal of Itterbeek, used in 1309, consists of a star and the words “S. Scabinorum de Itterbeka”. On a second seal, used around 1380, a crowned lion carrying a double rook is seen. The escutcheon of Itterbeek is derived from this seal.

In 1690 Itterbeek, Dilbeek and Sint-Martens-Bodegem were made a countship, Tirimont, by Charles II of Spain, and awarded to Louis-Alexander Scockart.

In 1977 Itterbeek became a part of Dilbeek.

== Geography ==
With 4487 inhabitants and her 541 hectares, Itterbeek is the fourth largest submunicipality of Dilbeek, after Dilbeek proper, Groot-Bijgaarden and Schepdaal. The village of Sint-Anna-Pede (and a small part of Sint-Gertrudis-Pede) also lie within the borders of the submunicipality of Itterbeek.

== Attractions ==
- The 13th-century Gothic church of St Peter
- The Sint-Anna Church in Sint-Anna-Pede: a 13th-century Romanesque church, which is depicted on The Blind Leading the Blind by Pieter Brueghel the elder.
- The Bruegelmuseum: 12 large reproductions of landscapes by Pieter Brueghel, who came to the area looking for inspiration.
- The seventeen bridges: a concrete viaduct 520m in length and 28m high across the valley of the Pedebeek. Sixteen of the bridges are part of the viaduct, while the seventeenth bridge lies under one of the arches.
- Timmermans Brewery: a Lambic beer brewery that was founded in 1781.

== Culture ==
=== Associations ===
- Chiro Allegro and Jokonta
- Davidsfonds Itterbeek, KWB, KAV and KVLV
- Kon. Fanfare Sint-Pieter
- Theater company Saffier

== Education ==
- 't Keperke
- De Wip

== Sport ==
- Football Club KVC Itna Itterbeek
- Tennis association SDI
