= The Parable of the Blind (novel) =

1985 novel by Gert Hofmann

- First edition (German)
- Author: Gert Hofmann
- Original title: Der Blindensturz
- Translator: Christopher Middleton
- Language: German
- Publication date: 1985
- Publication place: Germany
- English publication date: 1989
- Media type: Print (Hardback & Paperback)
- Pages: 152

Der Blindensturz (1985), translated as The Parable of the Blind, is a short novel in ten chapters by German writer Gert Hofmann.

Inspired by Parabel der Blinden (1568), a painting by Netherlandish artist Pieter Bruegel, the novel tells the story of the work's creation from the point of view of the six blind men depicted in the painting. The story is recounted in the present tense, first person plural. The "we" that comprises the six blind men often seems to consist of one entity; however, most of the men have separate names and identities and will sometimes say or do things that distinguish them from the group.

Der Blindensturz has been translated into English by Christopher Middleton for Fromm International in 1989.

== Synopsis ==
The action of the story is concerned with the six blind men who are hired to be painted by an unnamed painter (whom the reader will come to realize is Bruegel) and their confused journey to the painter's house. After becoming lost, nearly drowned, and attacked by a dog, the men finally arrive at the painter's house where they are fed and warmed (and nearly burned by the fire). The blind men are then led to a bridge and are told to repeatedly walk across it in a line as they hold on to each other and fall into the stream, while the painter paints them from inside his open window.

== Reception ==
In Spike Magazine, Edmund Hardy writes: "Hofmann’s prose is so concentrated and unrelenting that claustrophobia turns to terrible awareness . . . [the] novel is a joke on metaphor—which, classically, bridges the inward mental activity to the world of appearances, left in this novel as a swing bridge hanging over the water—making the parable, 'in this light', a parable of the parables." In his review, Hardy also praises Middleton's translation.

An anonymous reviewer in Kirkus Reviews writes: "Hofmann . . . has written a spare, surprisingly electric novella . . . [A] lean, effective, and subtle work, the best by Hofmann to be translated here so far."

Publishers Weekly describes the novel as an "implacably bleak fable."
