= Dilbeek =

- Municipality
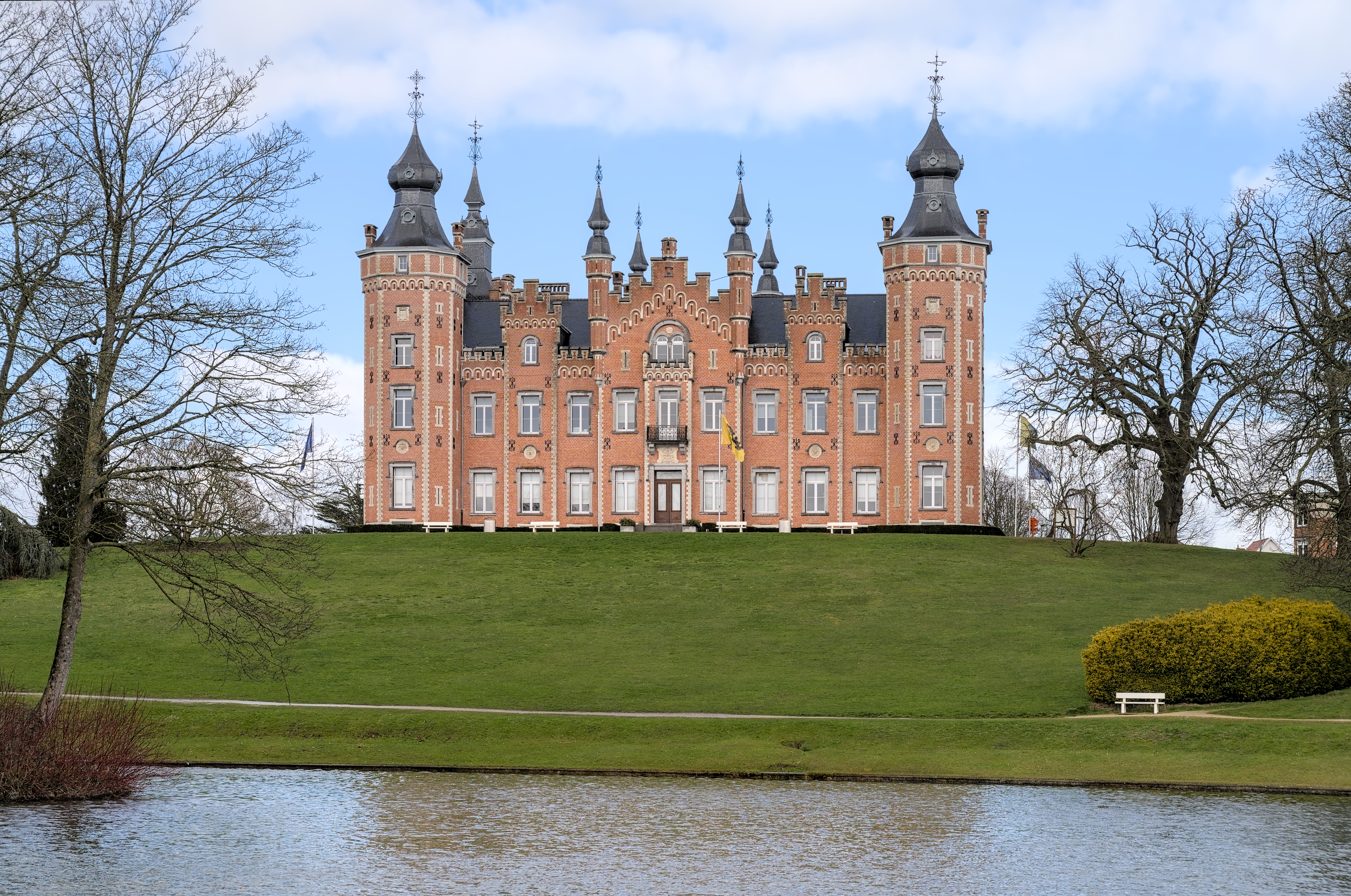
- De Viron Castle, serving as town hall

- Flag Coat of arms

- Location of Dilbeek in Flemish Brabant
- Interactive map of Dilbeek
- Location in Belgium
- Coordinates: 50°50′42″N 4°15′54″E
- Country: Belgium
- Community: Flemish Community
- Region: Flemish Region
- Province: Flemish Brabant
- Arrondissement: Halle-Vilvoorde

Government
  - Mayor: Stijn Quaghebeur (N-VA)
  - Governing parties: N-VA, Open Vld

Area
  - Total: 41.48 km^{2} (16.02 sq mi)

Population (2025-12-31)
  - Total: 45,180
  - Density: 1,089/km^{2} (2,821/sq mi)
- Postal codes: 1700–1703
- NIS code: 23016
- Area codes: 02
- Website: www.dilbeek.be

Dilbeek (Dutch pronunciation: [ˈdɪlbeːk]) is a municipality in the province of Flemish Brabant, in the Flemish region of Belgium. The municipality comprises the villages of Dilbeek proper, Groot-Bijgaarden, Itterbeek (with Sint-Anna-Pede), Schepdaal (with Sint-Gertrudis-Pede), Sint-Martens-Bodegem, and Sint-Ulriks-Kapelle. Dilbeek is located just outside the Brussels-Capital Region (and is part of the city's urban sprawl, contiguous with Berchem-Sainte-Agathe, Moortebeek (Anderlecht) and Molenbeek-Saint-Jean) in the Pajottenland, hence the local name Poort van het Pajottenland (Gate to the Pajottenland).

Even though Dilbeek is located in the Dutch-language area of Belgium, there is a French-speaking minority represented by 2 members on the 35-seat local council. It is a mostly residential community with some preserved rural areas and some industrial zones. The Brussels Ring road (R0, part of E19) bisects the municipality, with a major junction with the A10 motorway (part of E40) located within its boundaries.

== History ==
=== Medieval origins ===
The life of Saint Alena, the 7th-century martyr daughter of a lord of Dilbeek, was set in Dilbeek and Forest (Vorst). The historical facts of her life, however, are disputed. In Carolingian times, Dilbeek and its neighbouring villages were part of the pagus Bracbatensis. This territory, ruled by the Lords of Aa in Anderlecht, was integrated into the Landgraviate of Brabant by the counts of Leuven around 1085. The first mention of the name Dedelbeccha dates from 1075, while the name Bigardis, later transformed into Groot-Bijgaarden (in French Grand Bigard), dates from 1110. Bigardis was originally a dependency of the Abbey of Saint Bavo in Ghent, but by 1125, nuns under the leadership of Saint Wivina had founded a religious community there. Around 1183, the landgraviate became the Duchy of Brabant, within which Dilbeek remained as an independent parish until the French Revolution.

=== 16th century until now ===
The area's parishes belonged to the see of Cambrai until 1559 when they were placed under the administration of the Archbishop of Mechelen. Also in the 16th century, Dilbeek, Itterbeek and Sint-Martens-Bodegem were placed under the local rule of the Lords of Gaasbeek. The following decades were marked by the wars that opposed Catholics and Protestants, which resulted in the ruin of the Abbey of Groot-Bijgaarden. The final dismantlement and sale of the buildings occurred during the French regime in the 1790s.

== Events ==
- Each of the six communes that make up the current municipality organizes several annual fairs and kermesses.
- Every spring, a tulip festival takes place in Dilbeek.
- Each summer the Vijverfestival (Pond Festival), where Flemish bands perform on a floating stage, takes place at the pond behind the town hall in Dilbeek proper.

== Sights ==
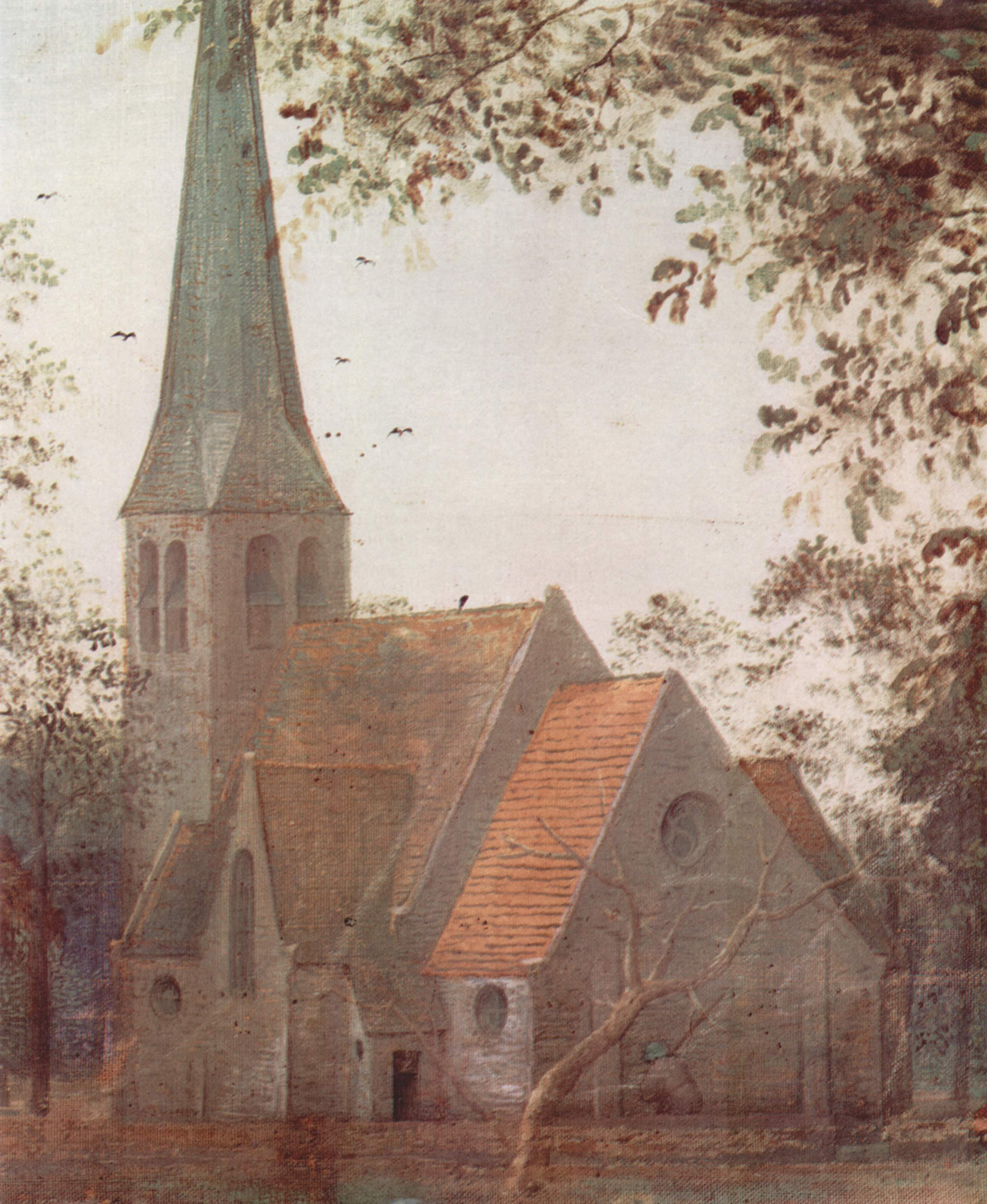
Church of Sint-Anna-Pede, as painted by Peter Brueghel the Elder in The Parable of the Blind

- The imposing castle of Groot-Bijgaarden was built in 1640 around a 14th-century keep. Nearby is the Sint-Wivina domain, where ruins of the original abbey still stand.
- Dilbeek's local authority offices, also known as the de Viron Castle, was built in 1863 in Tudor-style on the ruins of a 14th-century fortification. One of the medieval towers, the Sint-Alenatoren, can still be seen in the park surrounding the current building. On his visit to this fort, Charles V was reportedly served rabbit instead of his favourite hare, which resulted in the nickname konijnenfretters (rabbit eaters) for the inhabitants of Dilbeek. Several other buildings of interest (farm, ice cellar, stagecoach building) can also be found in the park
- The rural communes contain numerous old farms, including Het Neerhof, a 13th-century building that belonged to the abbey of Forest.
- The tower of the Sint-Ambrosiuskerk (church of Saint-Ambrose) dates from the same century.
- The main church of Sint-Anna-Pede (Itterbeek) was the model used by Peter Brueghel the Elder in his 1568 painting The Parable of the Blind currently in Naples. The village now houses a Brueghel museum as well as a restored watermill dating from 1776.
- Dilbeek also houses an interesting tram museum, tracing the history of this local mode of transportation since its beginning in 1887.
- The village of Sint-Gertrudis-Pede (Schepdaal) is the location of Payottenland's only working watermill, a centuries-old building thoroughly renovated in the eighties and nineties.
- Brewery Angerik, a microbrewery that brews ales, lambic beers and a lager.

== Famous inhabitants ==
- Saint Alena, Christian saint (died c. 640)
- Saint Wivina, monastic foundress, 12th century.
- Romain Maes, cyclist who won the 1935 Tour de France (1913–1983)
- Johan Anthierens, journalist, publicist, critic, and writer (1937–2000)
- Goedele Liekens, former Miss Belgium
- Urbanus, a famous Flemish comedian was born and raised in Schepdaal.
- Black Box Revelation, a garage-rock band formed in 2005 by Dilbeek natives Jan Paternoster and Dries Van Dijck.
- Remco Evenepoel, Belgian cyclist nicknamed the "Schepdaal Cannibal".
- Jean Brusselmans, Belgian painter

== Twin cities ==
- Austria: OberVellach, part of Hermagor
- United States: Dalton, Georgia
- South Africa: Franschhoek
