= Gert Hofmann =

Gert Hofmann (29 January 1931 – 1 July 1993) was a German writer and professor of German literature.

== Life ==
Hofmann was born and grew up in Limbach, Saxony which, after World War II, became part of East Germany. In 1948, he moved with his family to Leipzig. There, he attended a school for translators and interpreters, studying English and Russian. In 1950, he enrolled to Leipzig University, where he studied Romance languages and Slavic languages. In 1951, he fled from the German Democratic Republic and settled in Freiburg im Breisgau, where he continued his studies. In 1957, he graduated with a thesis on Henry James.

Hofmann began his writing career as a writer of radio plays. After one year as a research assistant at the University of Freiburg, he left Germany in 1961 for Bristol to teach German literature. Over the next ten years he taught at universities in Europe in Toulouse, Paris, Edinburgh, and in the United States at New Haven, Berkeley, California and Austin.

From 1971 to 1980 he lived in the southern Austrian town of Klagenfurt, while teaching at the University of Ljubljana in Slovenia, former Yugoslavia.

In 1980, aged 49, he returned to Germany, moving to Erding near Munich, becoming a novelist. He died there in 1993 after suffering a stroke.

== Works ==
A number of Hofmann's works have been translated by his son, the poet Michael Hofmann (born 1957 in Freiburg). Die Denunziation (1979) and Veilchenfeld (1986) are concerned with The Holocaust.

- Interpretationsprobleme bei Henry James (1957)
- Der Bürgermeister (1963). The Burgomaster, trans. Donald Watson (1968)
- Der Sohn (1966)
- Kündigungen (1969)
- Unser Mann in Madras (written 1965, published 1969). Adapted as a short film, Our Man in Madras, in 2014.
- Advokat Patelin (1976)
- Die Denunziation (1979)
- Die Fistelstimme (1980)
- Fuhlrotts Vergeßlichkeit. Portrait eines uns bekannten Kopfes (1981)
- Gespräch über Balzacs Pferd: Vier Novellen (1981). Balzac's Horse and Other Stories, trans. Christopher Middleton (1989)
- Die Überflutung (1981)
- Auf dem Turm (1982). The Spectacle at the Tower, trans. Christopher Middleton (1989)
- Die Rückkehr des verlorenen Jakob Michael Reinhold Lenz nach Riga (1984)
- Unsere Eroberung (1984). Our Conquest, trans. Christopher Middleton (1991)
- Der Blindensturz (1985). The Parable of the Blind, trans. Christopher Middleton (1989)
- Veilchenfeld (1986). Our Philosopher, trans. Eric Mace-Tessler (CB Editions, 2020; New York Review Books, 2023)
- Die Weltmaschine (1986)
- Casanova und die Figurantin (1987)
- Unsere Vergeßlichkeit (1987)
- Vor der Regenzeit (1988). Before the Rainy Season, trans. Edna McCown (1992)
- Der Kinoerzähler (1990). The Film Explainer, trans. Michael Hofmann (1996)
- Tolstois Kopf (1991)
- Das Glück (1992). Luck, trans. Michael Hofmann (2004)
- Das Thema kommt, verbeugt sich, sagt: Wie wär's? (1992)
- Die kleine Stechardin (1994). Lichtenberg and the Little Flower Girl, trans. Michael Hofmann (2004)

== Awards and honors ==
Hofmann received several literary awards during his lifetime including the Ingeborg-Bachmann-Preis for Die Fistelstimme (1979), the Alfred-Döblin-Preis (1982), and the Hörspielpreis der Kriegsblinden for Die Brautschau des Dichters Robert Walser im Hof der Anstaltswäscherei von Bellelay, Kanton Bern (1983). In 1987, he became a member of the Deutsche Akademie für Sprache und Dichtung in Darmstadt. He received the Literaturpreis der Stadt München in 1993. In 1995, Hofmann and his son Michael won the Independent Foreign Fiction Prize for The Film Explainer.

== See also ==
- The Holocaust in popular culture
