= Sint-Anna-Pede =

Coordinates: 50°49′54″N 4°14′00″E

Sint-Anna-Pede is a village in Itterbeek, Belgium, which is a deelgemeente of Dilbeek. It gets its name from the Pedebeek, the stream that flows through the village.

Sint-Anna-Pede was already mentioned in the first half of the 12th century as "Pethe"; later also as "capelle beatissima Anna in Peda" and as "apud Pede juxta nova capella", which means that there was possibly an older building at the same site.

== Attractions ==
- St. Anna's Church : a 13th-century Roman church, restored in the 17th century in the Gothic style. It is depicted in The Blind Leading the Blind, a painting by Pieter Bruegel the Elder. It has had protected status since 1948.
- the Bruegel Museum: twelve large reproductions of landscapes by Pieter Bruegel, who came to the area looking for inspiration.
- the Zeventien bruggen (Seventeen bridges): a concrete viaduct of 520 m long and 28 m high across the valley of the Pedebeek. Sixteen of the bridges are part of the viaduct, while the seventeenth bridge lies under one of the arches.
- the Klein Sint-Anna-kasteeltje (Small Saint-Anna Castle): a castle where, according to legend, Charles V of Spain, Bruegel and Louis XIV of France would have slept.
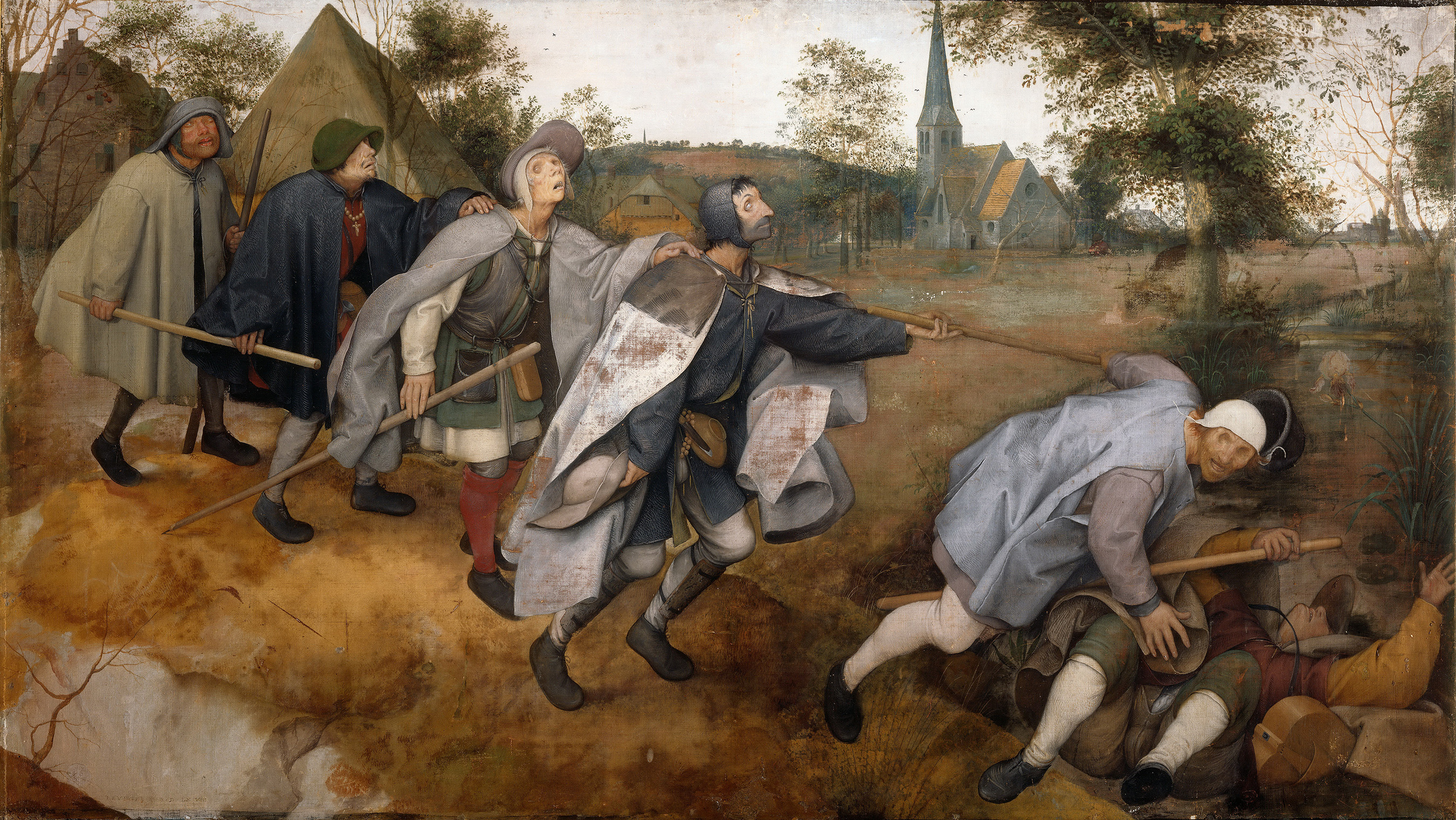
The Blind Leading the Blind, Pieter Bruegel the Elder, 1568

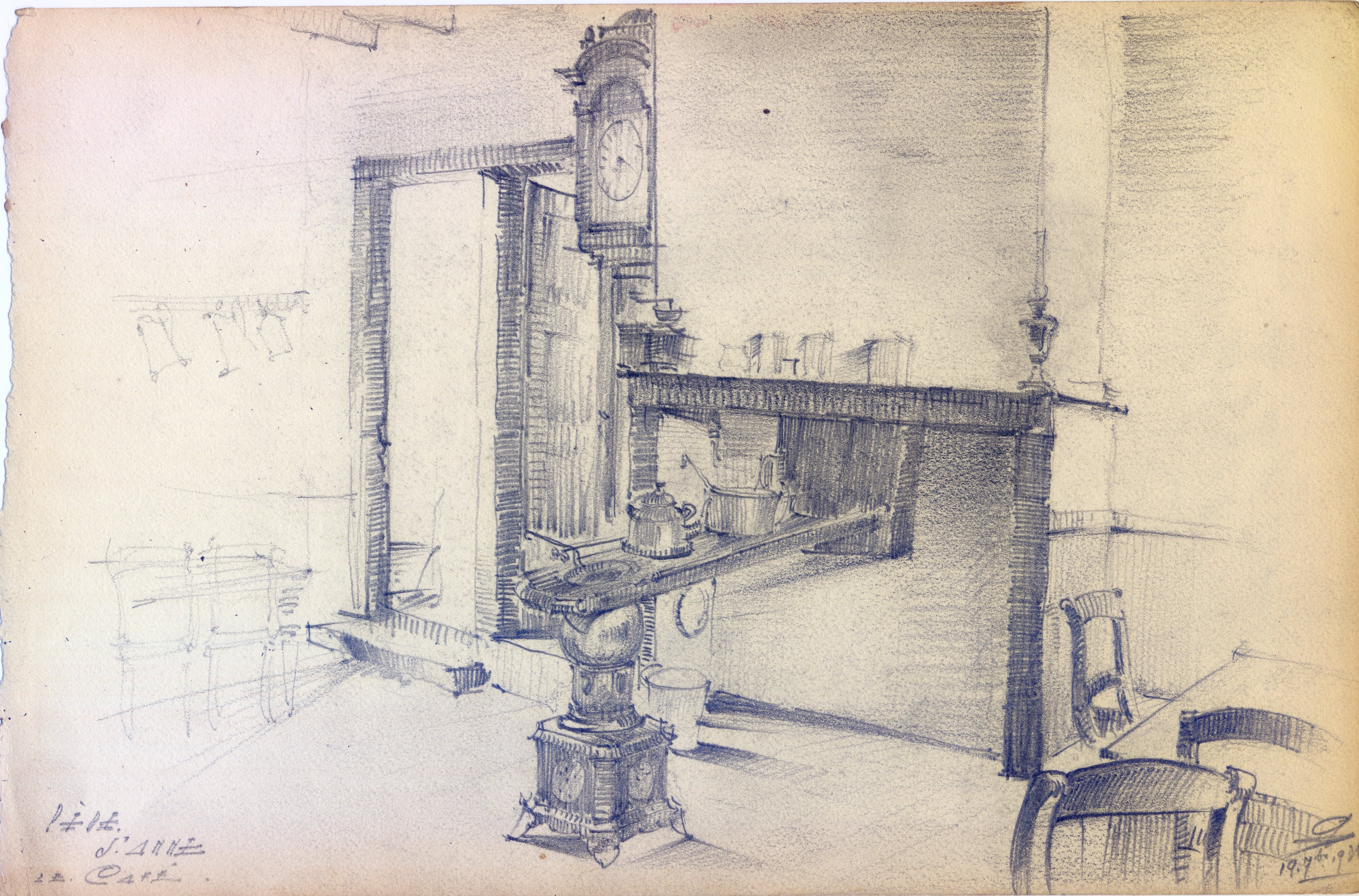
The old café at Sint-Anna-Pede, drawing by Léon van Dievoet, 1936
