= Verhaeghe Brewery =

Small brewery located in Belgium

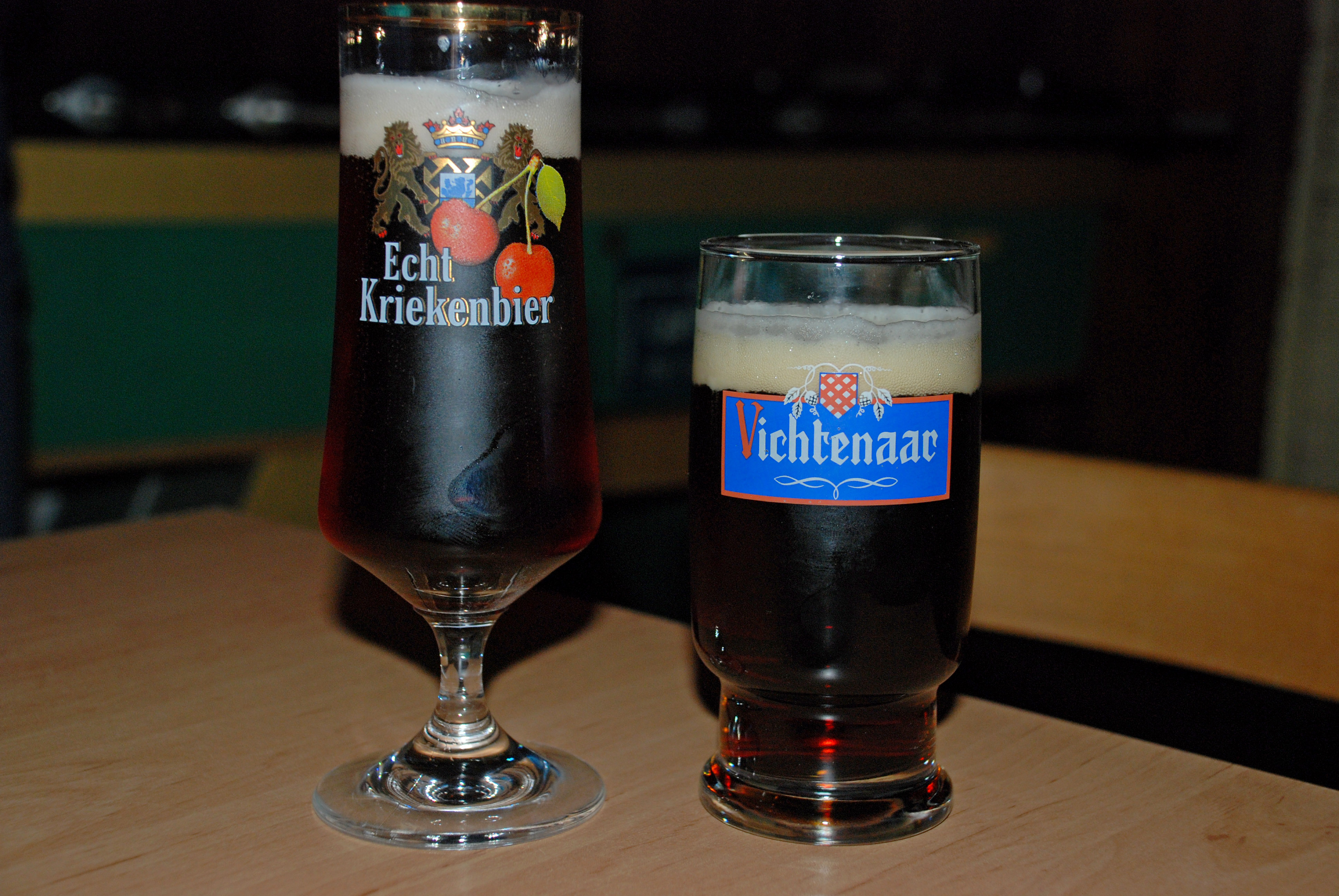
"Echt Kriekenbier" and "Poperings Nunnebier"

Brewery Verhaeghe (Dutch - Brouwerij Verhaeghe) established in 1875, is a small brewery located in Vichte, West Flanders, Belgium.

They specialise in Flanders red ales including Duchesse de Bourgogne, an internationally renowned Flemish red. In addition, their range includes Vichtenaar (the most basic Flemish red of the brewery); Echt Kriekenbier (Vichtenaar with cherries added in to create a kriek style beer); Verhaeghe Pils (the breweries pilsner style beer for local distribution); Cambrinus (a copper coloured hoppy ale); and Christmas-Verhaeghe (the breweries' Christmas style beer).
