= Timmermans Brewery =

Brewery in Itterbeek, Belgium

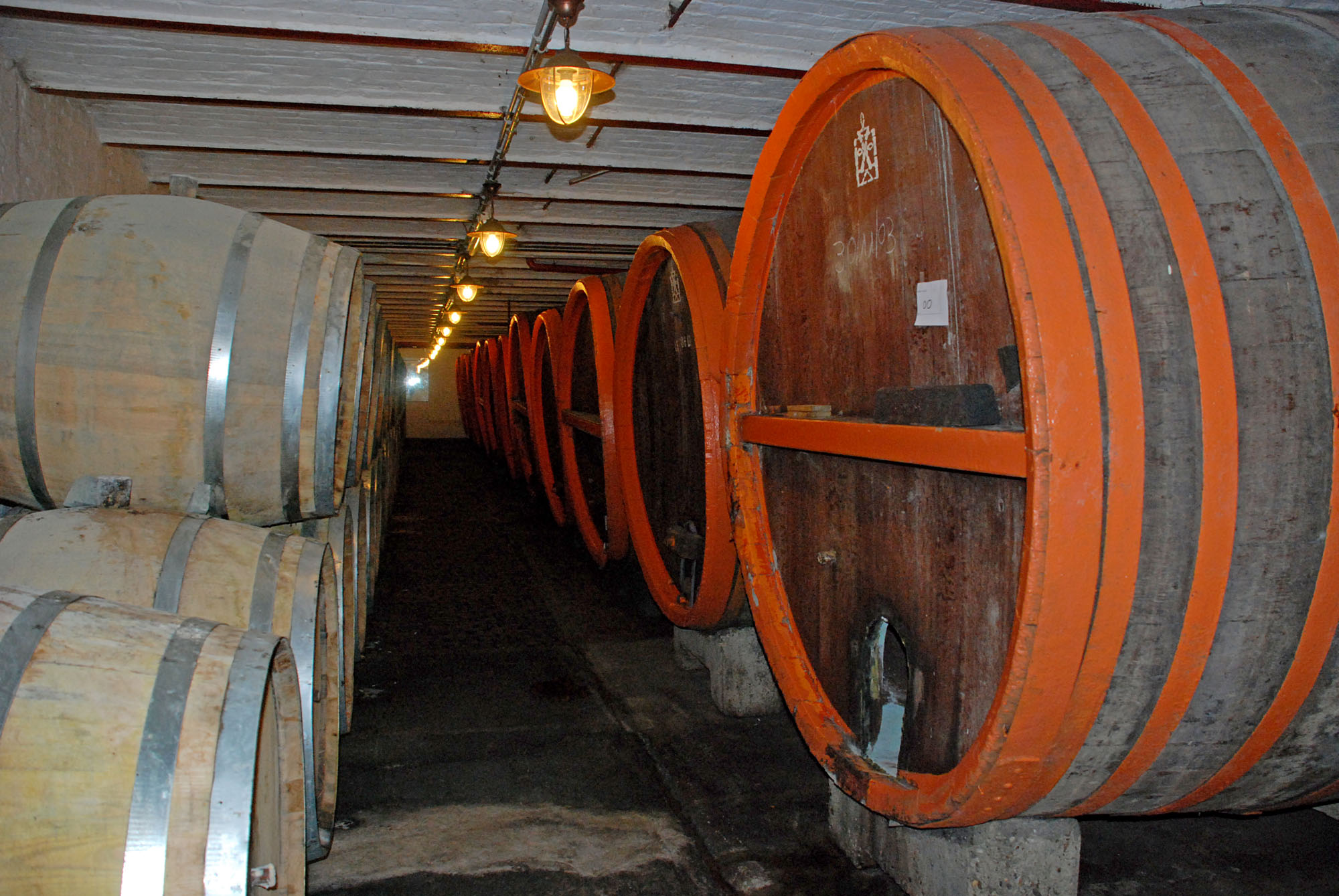
Barrels of fermenting beer at Timmermans

Brouwerij Timmermans (Timmermans Brewery) is a lambic brewery in Itterbeek, Belgium, founded in 1702.
