= Saint Anna's Church, Itterbeek =

Church in Dilbeek, Belgium

Coordinates: 50.83131°N 4.23364°E

Saint Anna's Church
- Dutch: Sint-Annakerk
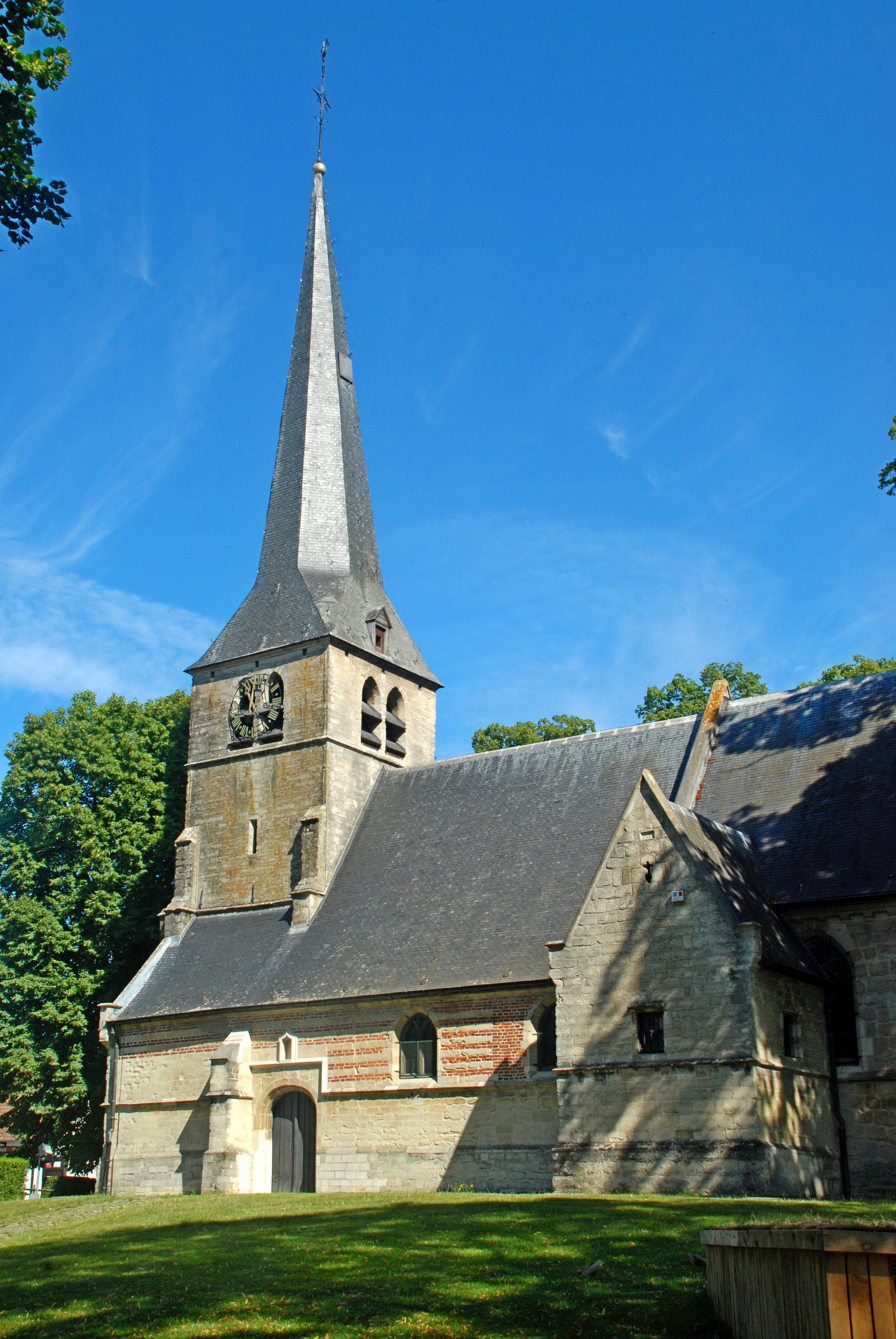
- Saint Anna's Church in 2013
- Saint Anna's Church
- Location: Sint-Anna-Pede, Dilbeek
- Country: Belgium
- Denomination: Roman Catholic

History
- Founded: c. 1250

Architecture
- Style: Romanesque, Gothic

Saint Anna's Church (Dutch: Sint-Annakerk) is a Roman Catholic church in Sint-Anna-Pede, in the municipality of Dilbeek, Belgium, built around 1250. It is depicted in the painting The Blind Leading the Blind by Pieter Breughel the Elder.

== History ==
Saint Anna's Church was built around 1250. Founded by the Beguine convent of Brussels. It is mentioned in apud Pede juxta nova capella ("at Pede near the new chapel").

The nave of the church was erected in the 16th century. In the 17th century, the church was renovated in a Gothic style, with the addition of a rib vault.

The church and surroundings were protected in 1948.

== Architecture ==
Saint Anna's Church is built in sandstone, combined with layers of bricks. It has both Romanesque and Gothic architectural characteristics. The church furniture includes a wooden pulpit with an image of the Good Shepherd (18th century), statues of Saint Joseph (18th century) and a wooden statue of Saint Anna with her daughter Maria (17th century).

The church is situated in the middle of a former cemetery and is surrounded by a copse of trees.

== The Blind Leading the Blind ==
Saint Anna's Church is depicted in the painting The Blind Leading the Blind by Pieter Breughel the Elder. The painting shows six blind men walking past the Pedebeek stream. The first one has already fallen and is lying in the stream. The second one tries to keep his balance, but starts to fall anyway. In his fall, he drags the third one with him. The last three have yet to fall.

According to a local legend, the painter lived at the time in the small castle that is also represented in the painting.

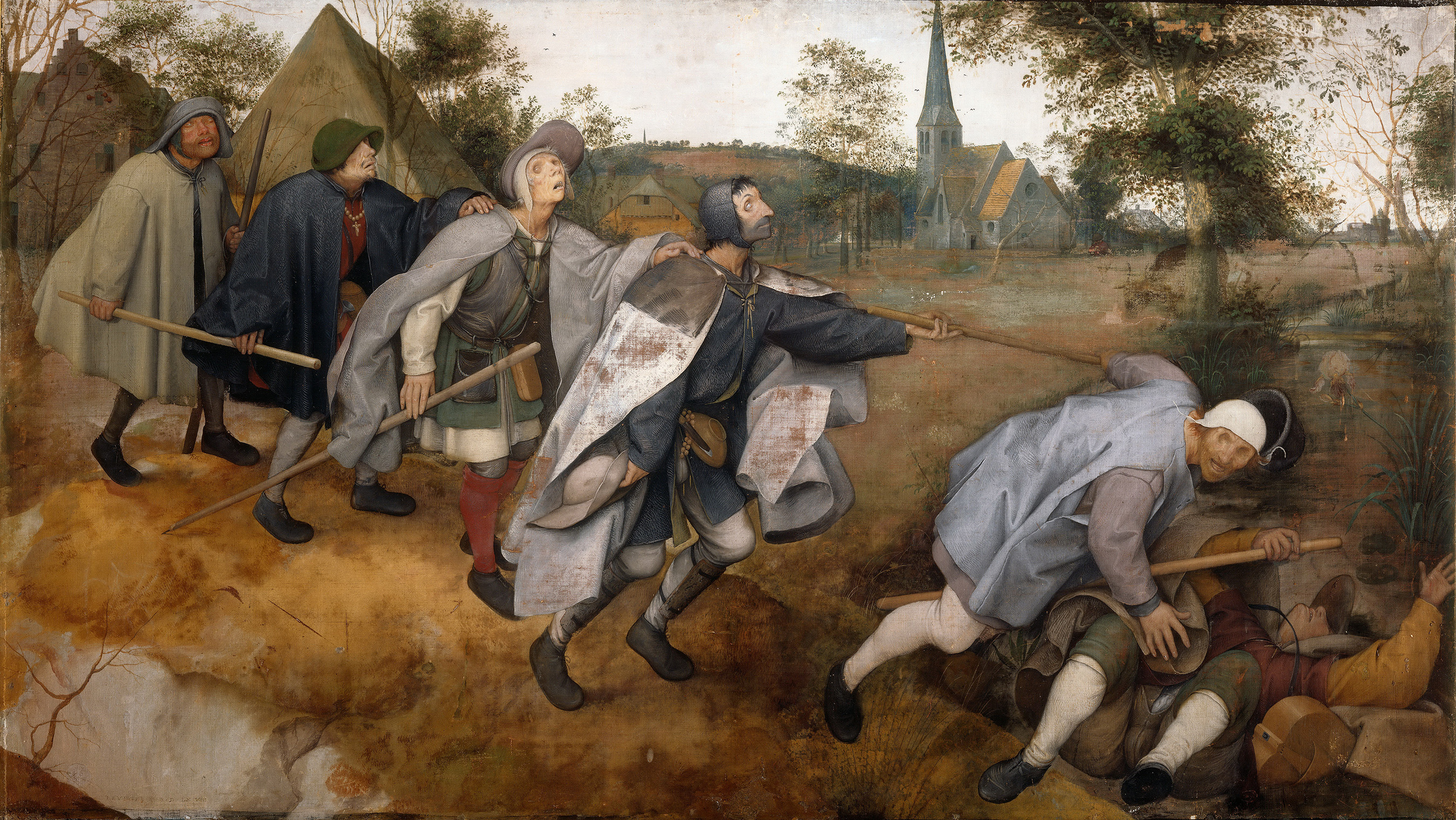
The Blind Leading the Blind, Pieter Breughel the Elder, 1568

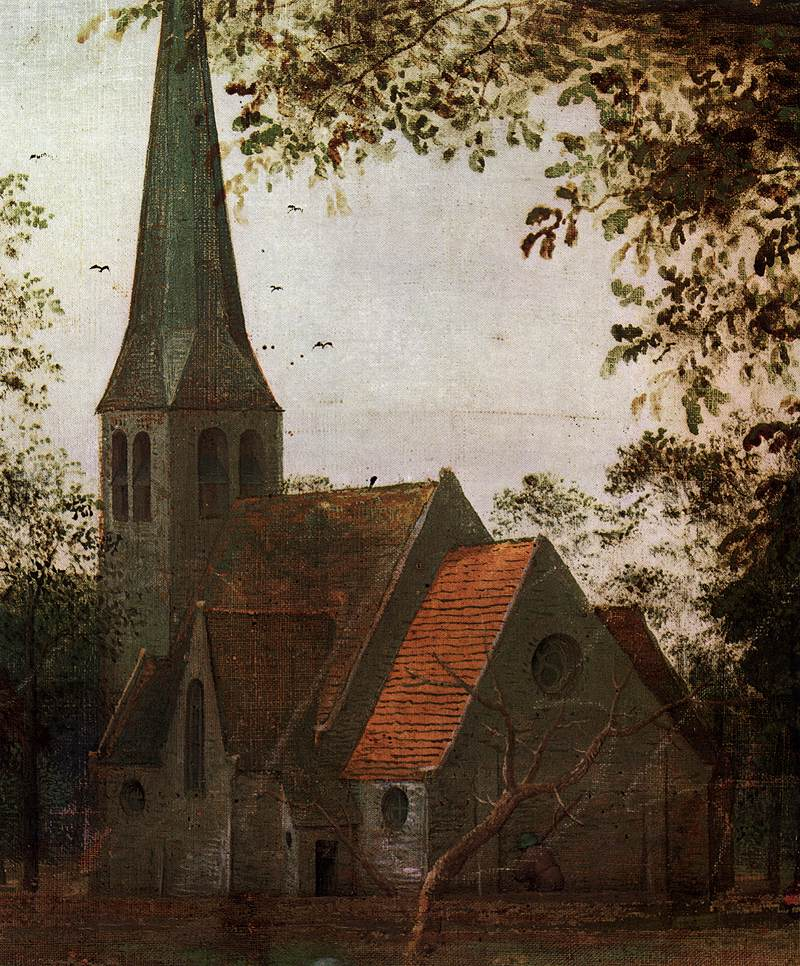
Detail of the painting depicting Saint Anna's Church

== Bibliography ==
- Article by Toerisme Dilbeek:
  - Summary/abstract: "Sint-Annakerk: Herdebeekstraat 176 – 1701 Itterbeek – beschermd bij RB 19.07.1948". ITTERBEEK. Toerisme Dilbeek (in Dutch). Archived from the original on 25 April 2012.
  - Full version: Huug (22 December 2009). "De Sint-Annakerk: Herdebeekstraat 176 – 1701 Itterbeek, Geklasseerd bij Regentsbesluit van 19.7.1948" [St. Anna's Church: ...] (PDF) (in Dutch). Uit: openmonumentenmap 1991. Archived from the original (PDF) on 25 April 2012.
