= Flanders red ale =

Belgian beer style

- Country of origin: Belgium
- Yeast type: Top-fermenting
- Alcohol by volume: 5.0% - 6.2%
- Color (SRM): 10 - 16
- Bitterness (IBU): 15 - 25
- Original gravity: 1.046 - 1.054
- Final gravity: 1.008 - 1.016

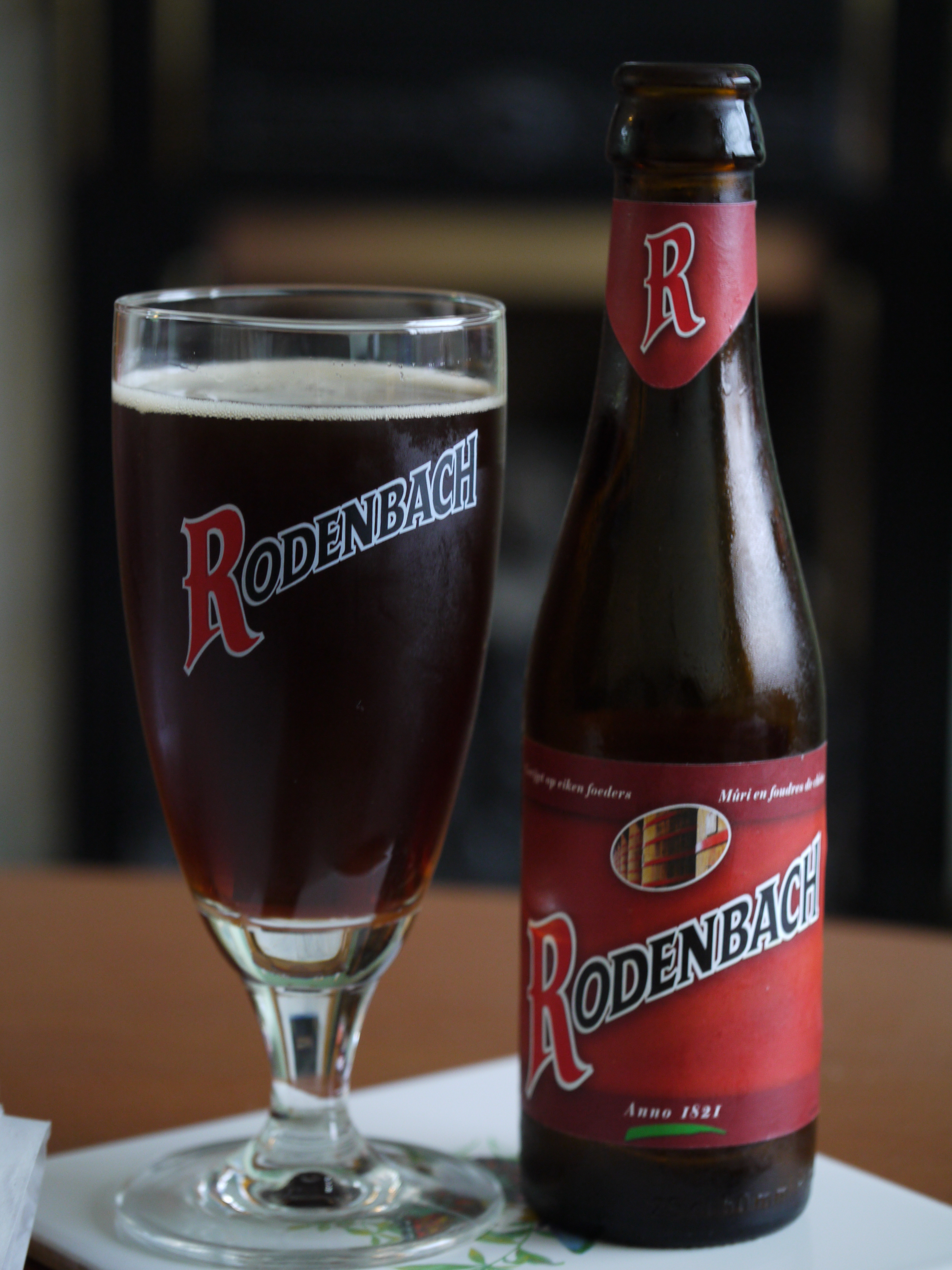
A Rodenbach Flemish red ale.

Flanders red ale (Dutch: Vlaamse rode ale) or Flemish red-brown (Vlaams roodbruin), is a style of sour ale brewed in West Flanders, Belgium.

Flanders red ale is fermented with organisms other than Saccharomyces cerevisiae, especially Lactobacillus, which produces a sour character attributable to lactic acid. Long periods of aging are employed, a year or more, often in oak barrels, to impart a lactic acid character to the beer. Red malt is used to give the beer its colour and the matured beer is often blended with a younger batch before bottling to balance and round the character.

Flanders red ales have a strong fruit flavour similar to the aroma, but more intense. Plum, prune, raisin and raspberry are the most common flavours, followed by orange and some spiciness. The sour or acidic taste can range from moderate to strong. There is no hop bitterness, but tannins are common. Consequently, Flanders red ales are often described as the most wine-like of all beers.

Notable examples include Duchesse de Bourgogne, Rodenbach and VanderGhinste Roodbruin.

== Examples ==
- Rodenbach Brewery: Rodenbach
- Rodenbach Brewery: Rodenbach Grand Cru
- Omer Vander Ghinste Brewery: VanderGhinste Roodbruin
- Omer Vander Ghinste Brewery: Cuvee des Jacobins
- Brewery Verhaeghe: Duchesse de Bourgogne
- Brewery Verhaeghe: Vichtenaar
- Bourgogne des Flandres
