= TTA =

TTA may refer to

- Tan Tan Airport, Morocco, IATA code
- Teacher Training Agency, former name of the Training and Development Agency for Schools, England
- Technical Theatre Awards, UK
- Terran Trade Authority, the setting for a series of science-fiction books
- Tetradecylthioacetic acid, a fatty acid
- The Three Amigonauts, a cartoon series
- The Tough Alliance, a synthpop duo from Sweden
- Thenoyltrifluoroacetone, a chelating agent also commonly known as TTFA
- Tibial tuberosity advancement, a knee operation in dogs
- Tiny Toon Adventures, an animated television series
- Toledo Technology Academy, a public high school in Toledo, Ohio, US
- Tomorrowland Transit Authority PeopleMover, in Tomorrowland in Magic Kingdom at Walt Disney World Resort in Orlando, Florida
- Total TEU Allowance
- Tramway Touristique de l'Aisne, a tourist tramway in Belgium
- Transport Ticketing Authority, Victoria, Australia
- Transport triggered architecture, computer processor design
- Triangle Transit Authority, a regional transit service in North Carolina, US
- Tri-State Transit Authority, a transit service in the Huntington, West Virginia, US area
- Ṭa (Indic), the eleventh consonant of Indic abugidas
- Transfusion-transmitted anaplasmosis, a human bacterial infection caused by blood transfusion
- TTA – Racing Elite League, a Swedish touring car championship
- TTA, a codon for the amino acid Leucine
