= Schepdaal =

Village and deelgemeente of Dilbeek in Flanders, Belgium

Coordinates: 50°50′N 4°11′E

Schepdaal is a village and deelgemeente of Dilbeek in Flanders, Belgium.

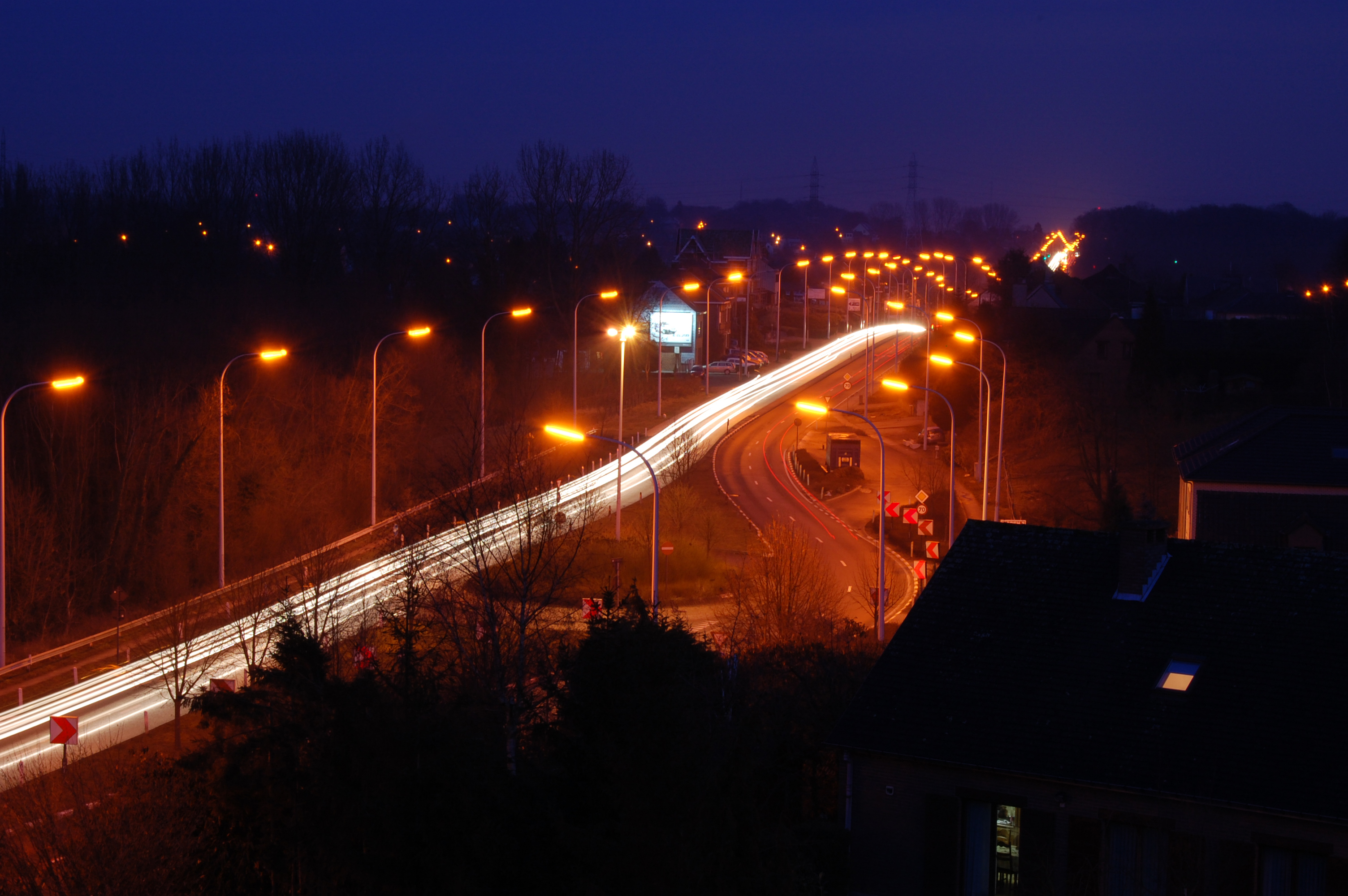

== History ==
The oldest mention dates back to 1260, when the area was called Scepdale. Before 1827 Schepdaal was a part of Zierbeek, named after the stream with the same name that runs through the village, and was a part of Sint-Martens-Lennik.

From 1497 to 1577 Schepdaal was the property of the lords of Gaasbeek. In 1457 Zierbeek had its own seal.

Only until the occupation by Holland, Schepdaal became a municipality on its own. Clerical, it became independent of Sint-Martens-Lennik in 1842. In 1977 it became a deelgemeente of Dilbeek.

== Geography ==
Apart from Schepdaal itself, there are two other villages within its borders: Sint-Gertrudis-Pede and Zierbeek. Schepdaal has 5372 inhabitants.

== Attractions ==
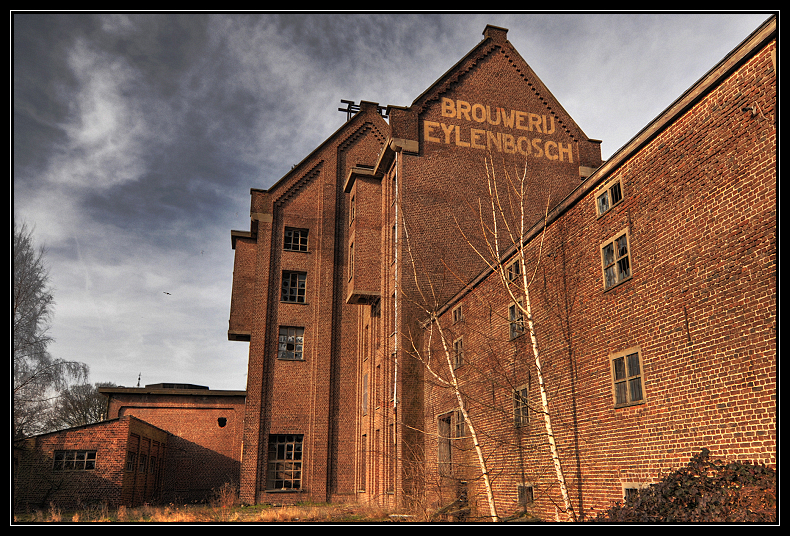
Former brewery Eylenbosch

=== Schepdaal ===
- Tram Museum (1962)
- Former brewery Eylenbosch (1851)
- Sint-Rumoldus Church (1853)
- Castle of Schepdaal (now on the territory of Sint-Martens-Lennik)

=== Sint-Gertrudis-Pede ===
- Watermill Sint-Gertrudis-Pede (1774)
- Sint Geertrui church

=== Zierbeek ===
- Hof te Zierebeek (18th century)

== Public transport ==
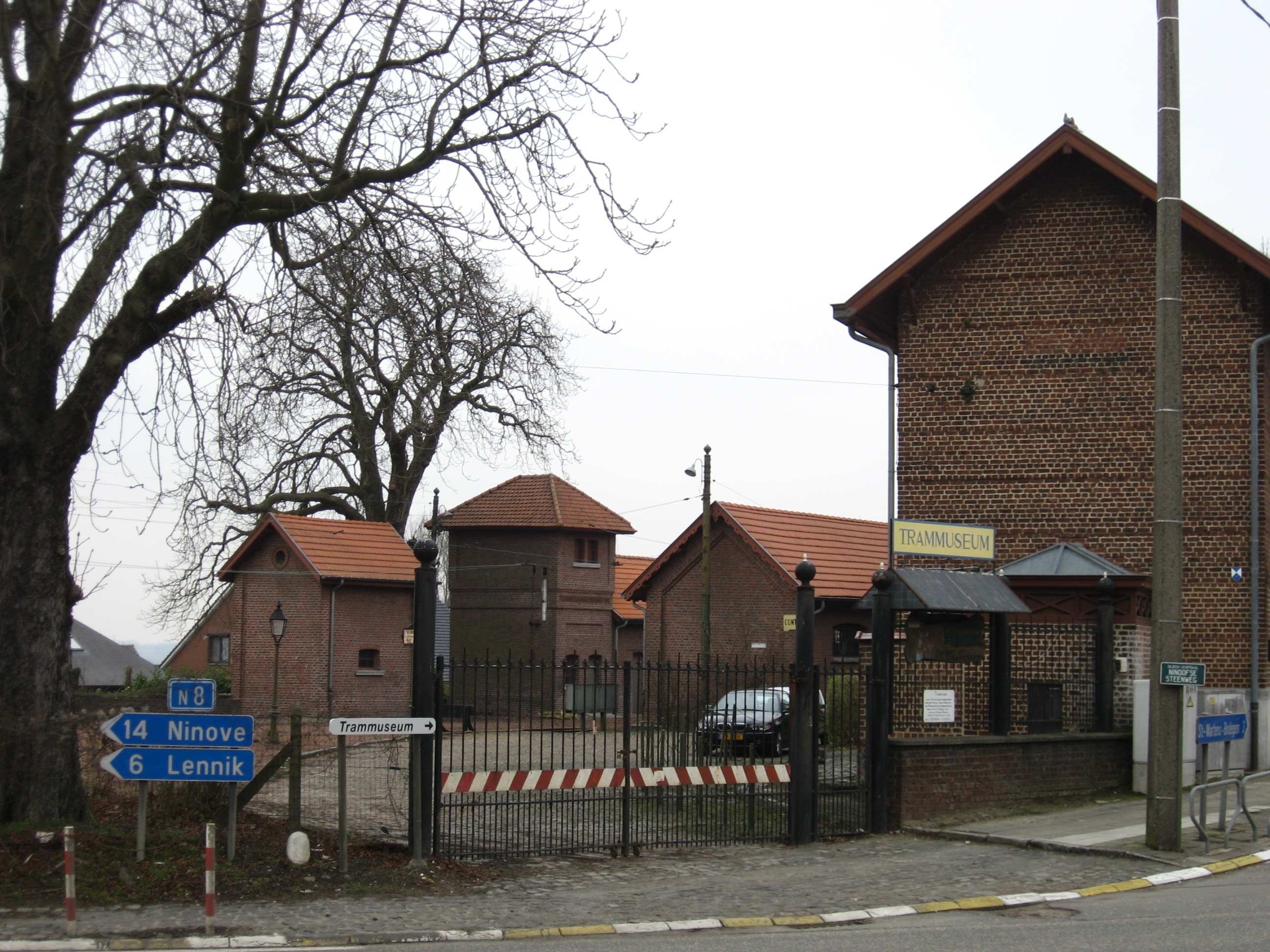
Museum entrance

On 8 September 1887 the first vicinal tramway in Brabant, Schepdaal – Brussels Ninoofsepoort was opened. The depot of the line was located in Schepdaal. This depot was transformed into the National Museum of Vicinal Tramways in the late 60's. The museum was maintained by volunteers, and closed in 1998 for renovations. On 1 July 2009 the tram Museum was reopened by the vzw "erfgoed Vlaanderen".

== Sport ==
- Football Club FC Schepdaal

== Famous inhabitants ==
- Urbain Servranckx, better known as the comic Urbanus, is born in Sint-Gertrudis-Pede.
- Adri van Tiggelen, former Dutch football player of Anderlecht.
- Remco Evenepoel, a cyclist from Belgium, lives in Schepdaal.
- Jef Valkeniers, last mayor of Schepdaal.
