= Tram engine =

Type of tram

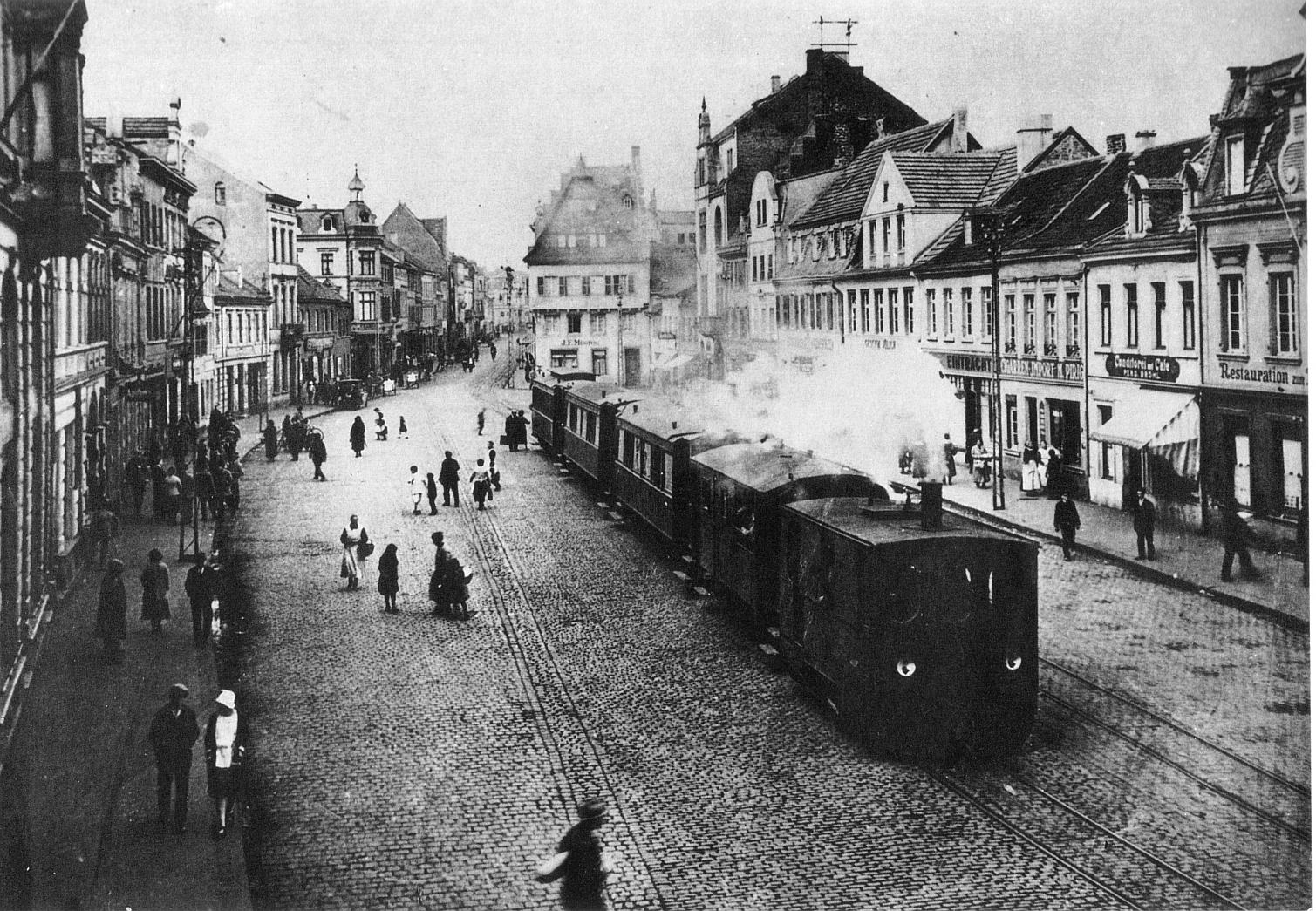
A German steam tram engine from the Cologne-Bonn railway, pulling a train through Brühl marketplace.

A tram engine is a steam locomotive specially built or modified to run on a tramway track on or beside a road or street.

== Legal and safety requirements ==
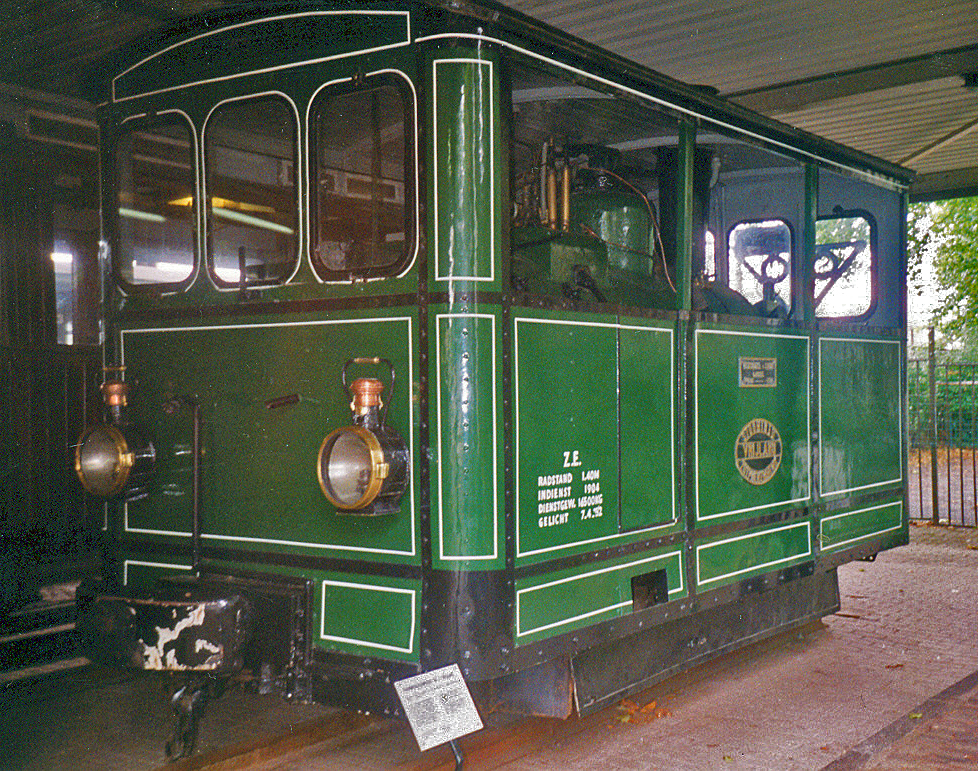
Steam tram locomotive from the Geldersche Tramwegen in the Netherlands

In the steam locomotive era, tram engines had to comply with certain legal requirements and safety and environmental standards, although these varied depending on the country or region used:

- The engine must be governed to a maximum speed of 16 kilometres per hour (9.9 mph) (12 km/h or 7.5 mph in the UK),
- No steam or smoke may be emitted,
- It must be free of noise and vibration generated by blast or clatter,
- The machinery must be concealed from view at all points above 10 centimetres (3.9 in) from rail level,
- Most of the locomotives must have a driver's cab at each end.

To avoid emission of smoke, the fuel used was coke instead of coal. To prevent visible release of steam into the atmosphere, two opposite systems were used:

- condensing the exhaust steam back into water, which would be re-circulated back into the water tank,
- reheating the exhaust steam to make it invisible.

== Builders ==
=== United Kingdom ===
Great Eastern Railway

The Great Eastern Railway built ten Class G15 0-4-0T trams from 1883 to 1897 and twelve Class C53 0-6-0T trams from 1903 to 1921.

Beyer, Peacock & Company

Beyer, Peacock & Company built some steam tram engines, including three for the Glyn Valley Tramway in Wales.

Henry Hughes

Hughes's Locomotive & Tramway Engine Works, Loughborough started building tram engines in 1876. His engines were of the saddle-tank type and exhaust steam was condensed in a tank under the footplate by jets of cold water from the saddle-tank.

Kitson & Company

Kitson & Company started to build tram engines in 1878. It used a roof-mounted, air-cooled, condenser of thin copper tubes in which the exhaust steam was condensed, similar to the radiator on a modern road vehicle. The air-cooled system eventually became standard for steam tram engines.

William Wilkinson

William Wilkinson of Holme House Foundry, Wigan patented the exhaust steam reheating system about 1881. While it may seem unusual to re-heat steam after, rather than before, use because it would involve a waste of fuel, the purpose of superheating the exhaust was to ensure 'no water can be emitted from the chimney to the annoyance of passengers'. Furthermore, the expansion into a hot chamber in the boiler minimised the noise of the exhaust. Despite the inefficiency inherent in this, the Wilkinson system was popular for a time, and engines of the Wilkinson type continued to be built up to about 1886. Similar reheaters were also used for road steam wagons, such as the Sentinel.

Others

Other British builders of steam tram engines included:

- Aveling & Porter
- Charles Burrell & Sons
- Dick, Kerr & Company
- Thomas Green & Son
- Manlove, Alliott & Company
- Manning Wardle
- Merryweather & Sons
- Hawthorn Leslie built steam tram locomotives for the Railway Operating Division in 1915; they were copies on SNCV type 18.

=== Germany ===
Krauss

The German firm Krauss built steam tram engines, including one for the Wolverton and Stony Stratford Tramway in England.

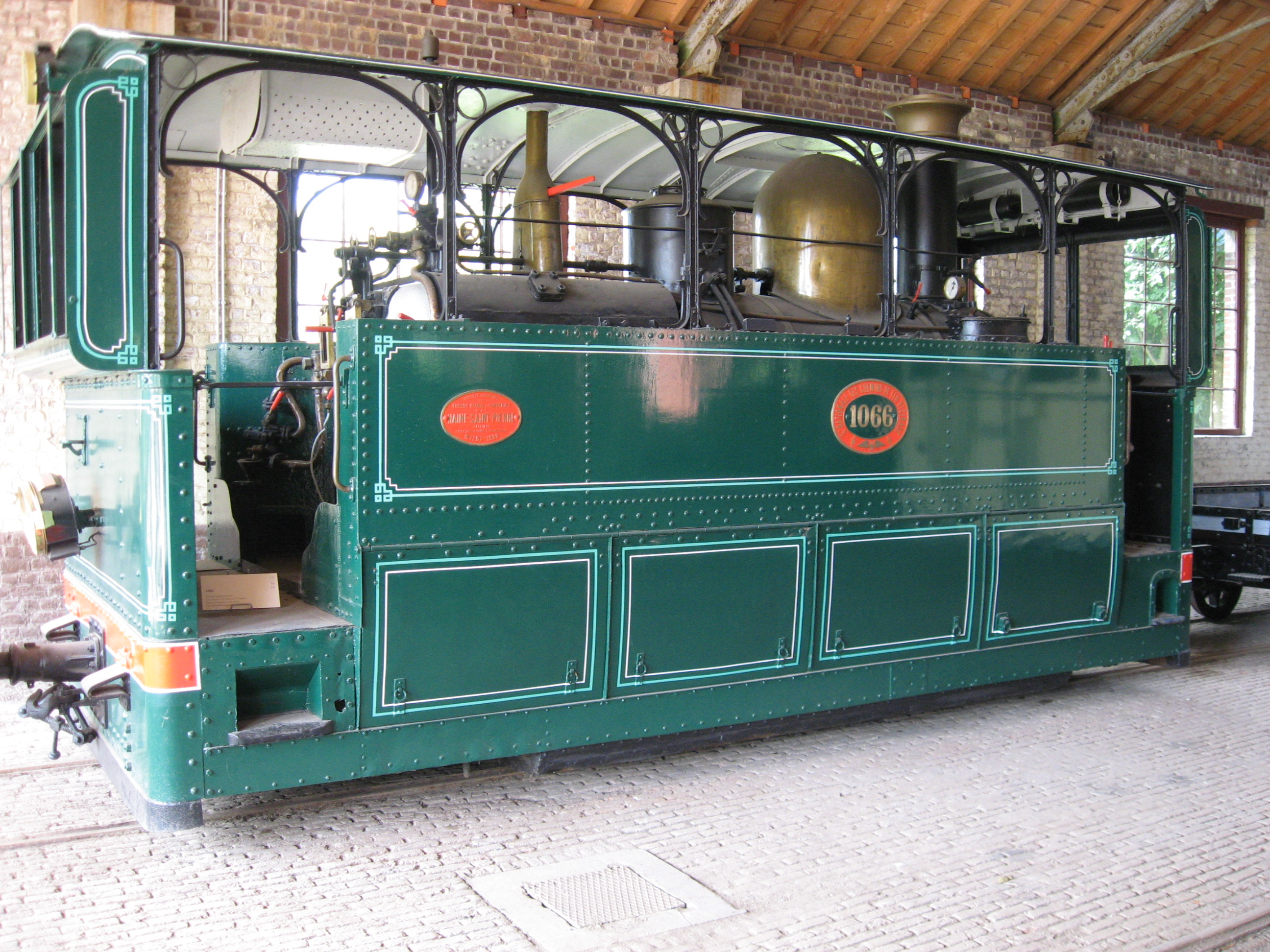
SNCV tram engine (Haine-Saint-Pierre, 1920)

=== Belgium ===
From the 1880s onward, every steam locomotive builder in Belgium supplied the National Company of Light Railways (SNCV in French) with tram engines, with nearly 1,000 examples being built. Ateliers de Tubize, FUF Haine-Saint-Pierre and Société de Saint-Léonard also supplied several tram engines to foreign companies such as Spain, the Netherlands, France, or Italy.

The last steam trams were delivered in the early 1920s.

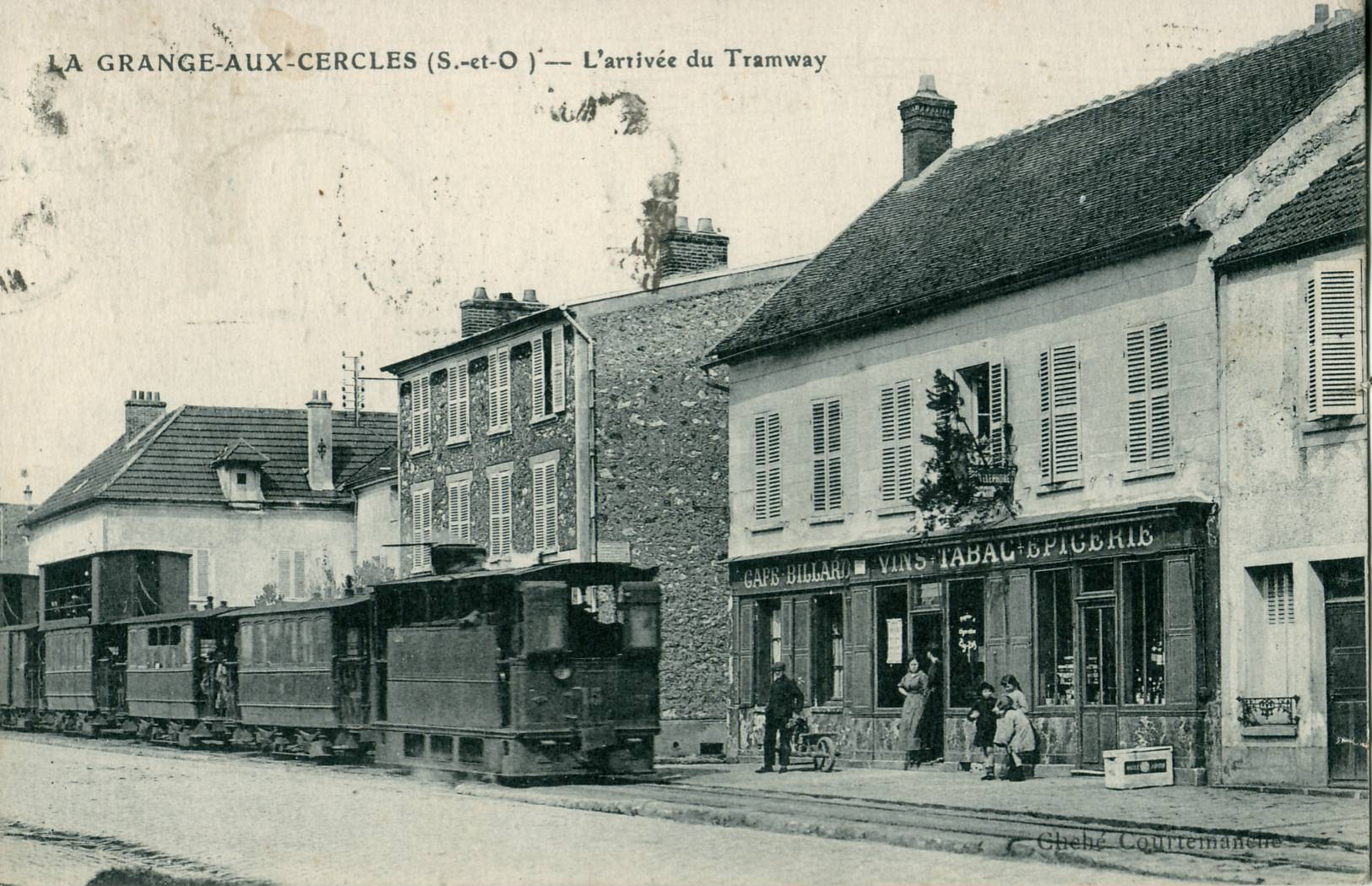
Steam tram in France.

=== France ===
Corpet-Louvet, Décauville, Pinguely, and Blanc-Misseron built engines for French and foreign tramways, the latter was created by Ateliers de Tubize in order to avoid taxation of imported locomotives. These companies also built industrial engines and some shunters; large steam locomotives were mostly built by other companies.

=== The Netherlands ===
Werkspoor and Backer & Rueb built engines for both Dutch and foreign tramways.

=== United States ===
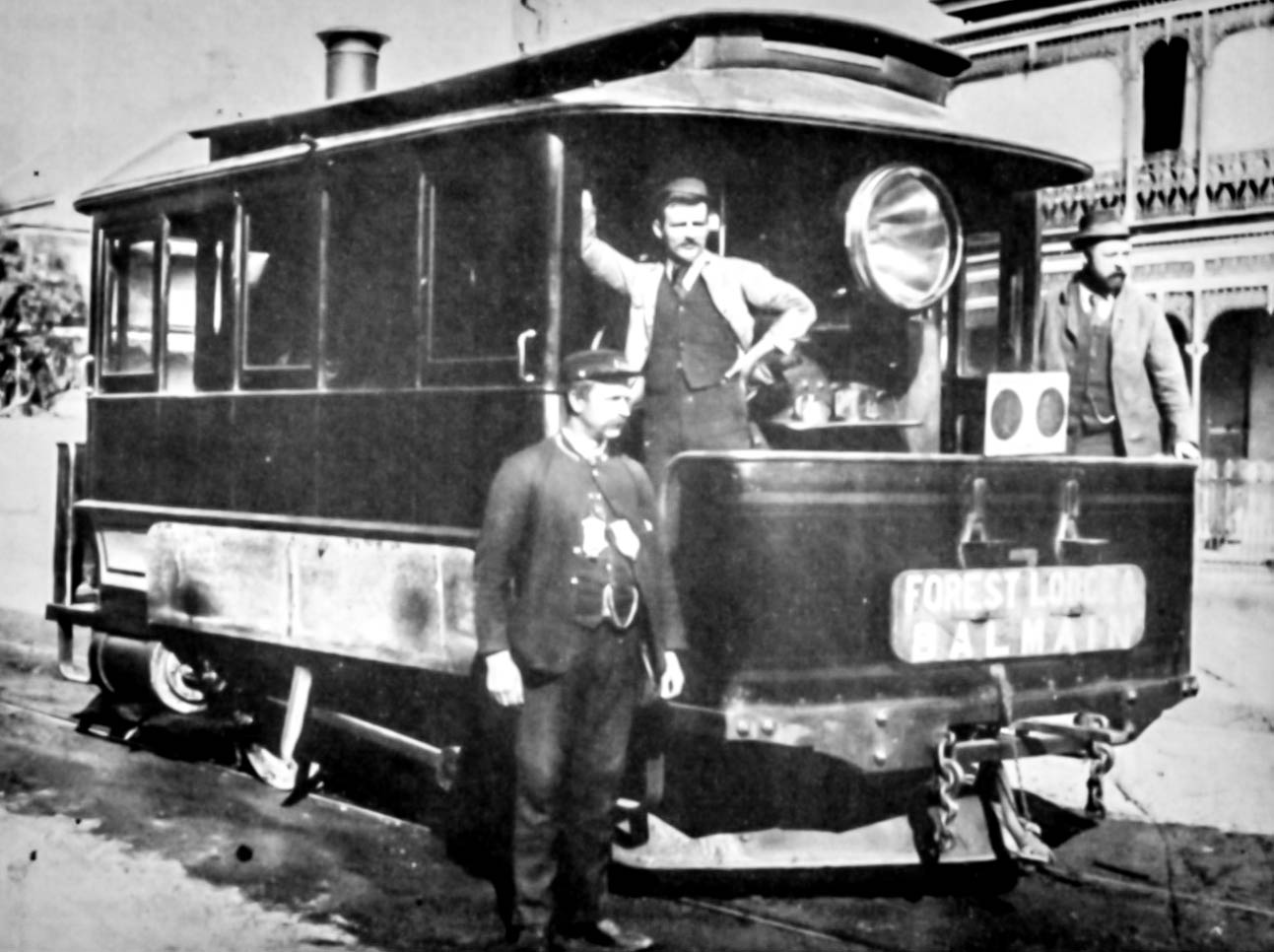
NSWGT Tram Motor No. 7

==== Baldwin ====
The Baldwin Locomotive Works in Philadelphia, Pennsylvania, USA, built steam tram engines, including most of those used in New South Wales, Australia.

A small number of steam tram engines were manufactured in Sydney, Australia to Baldwin designs by Henry Vale, T. Wearne and the Randwick Tramway Workshops.

== Decline ==
In many cities, steam tram engines faded out around 1900, being replaced by electric trams or buses. Rural steam trams continued longer until they were replaced by electric or diesel tram units, or buses. In France, the Netherlands and Belgium, the last steam-powered tramway lines had closed in the 1960s.

== Preservation ==
- Kitson 0-4-0 steam tram engine (Portstewart Tramway No. 1) at Streetlife Museum of Transport, Kingston upon Hull
- Kitson 0-4-0 steam tram engine (Portstewart Tramway No. 2) at the Ulster Folk and Transport Museum, Cultra, County Down.
- Kitson 0-4-0 steam tram engine (Christchurch Tramways No. 7) at the Tramway Historical Society of New Zealand, Ferrymead, Christchurch, New Zealand.
- Beyer Peacock 0-4-0 steam tram engine at National Tramway Museum, Crich, Derbyshire
- Krauss 0-4-0 Gamba de Legn tram engine at the "Leonardo da Vinci" National Museum for Science and Technology in Milan, Italy.
- 0-4-0 Ateliers de Tubize 1912 steam tram engine in Settimo Milanese (Milan), Italy.
- Henschel & Sohn 0-4-0 steam tram engine (Darmstadt Tramway No. 7, "Feuriger Elias") at Darmstadt-Kranichstein Railway Museum, Germany.
- Two Baldwin and one Baldwin-designed Sydney Steam Tram Motors survive in museums.
- Purrey self-contained steam tram, reconstructed in 1988, at the Archer Park Rail Museum in Rockhampton.
- SNCV type 7 0-6-0 (Ateliers de Tubize, 1888), at the ASVi museum (Belgium). This engine, kept in working order, is the eldest preserved SNCV engine.
- SNCV type 7 (Société Franco-Belge, 1912), at Blegny-Mine.
- SNCV type 19 0-6-0 (Hawthorn, Leslie & Co, 1915, ex-Railway Operating Division) at the Tramsite Schepdaal.
- SNCV type 18 0-6-0 (Haine-Saint-Pierre, 1920) at the Schepdaal museum (working).
- Three SNCV type 18 (one built by J.J. Gilain in 1915, and two by Grand-Hornu in 1920), at the Tramway touristique de l'Aisne (Belgium).
- 3 Blanc-Misseron 0-6-0 steam tram locomotives (Tramways De le Sarthe (TS)), one built in 1882 and the other in 1898, with one currently in working order at the MTVS.

== In popular culture ==
The character Toby the Tram Engine, from The Railway Series children's books by the Rev. W. Awdry, and the spin-off TV series Thomas & Friends, was based on the LNER Class J70 tram engines that were to be found on the Wisbech and Upwell Tramway.

Flora from Series 12 of Thomas & Friends is also based on a steam tram.

== Other types of propulsion ==
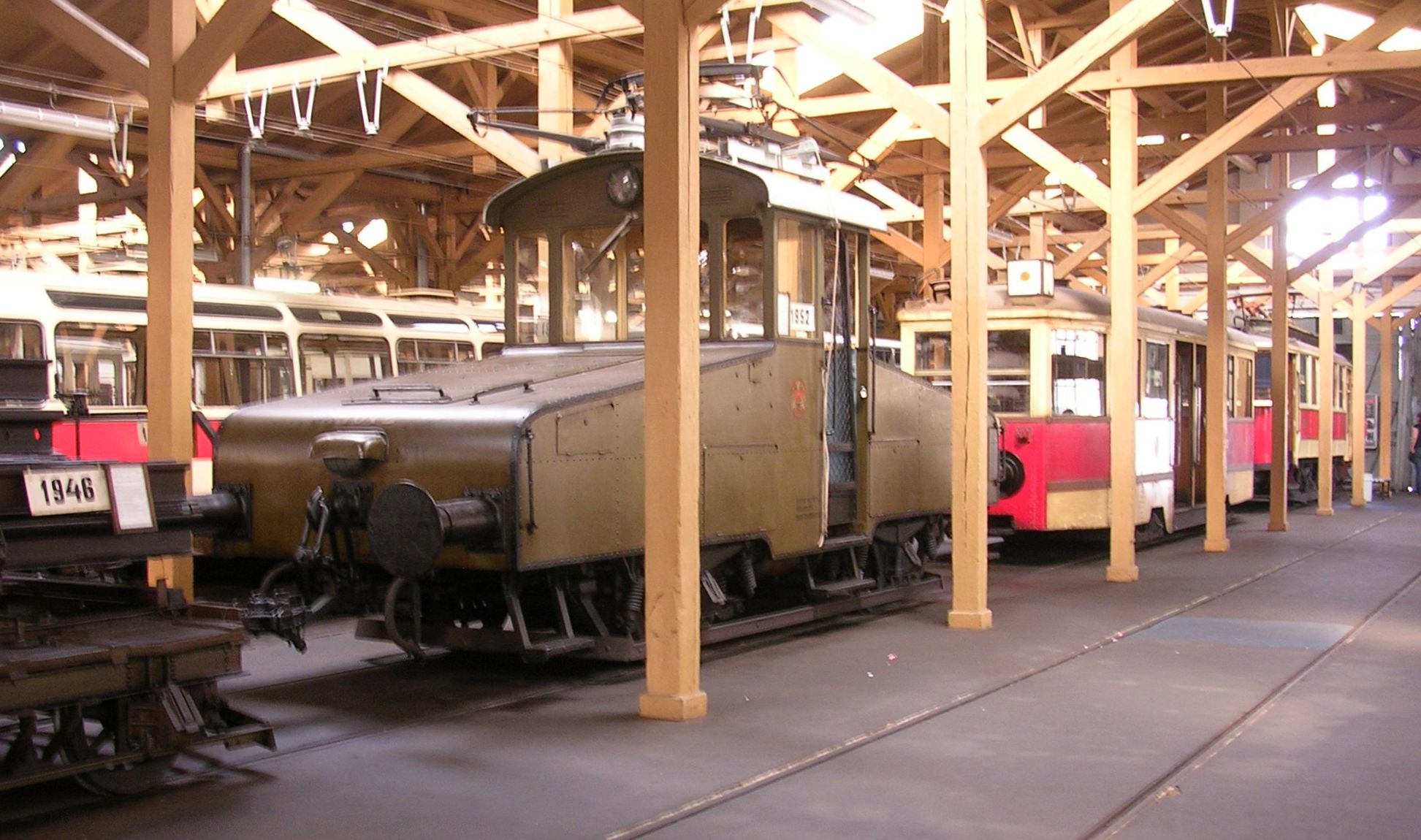
An electric tram locomotive, Střešovice, Prague, the Czech Republic

=== Diesel tram engines ===
Four of the British Rail Class 04 diesel locomotives were fitted with side-plates and cowcatchers for working on the Wisbech and Upwell Tramway.

=== Electric tram engines ===
There are a few examples of electric tram locomotives designed to pull traditional railway carriages through streets.

=== Stored energy types ===
Tram engines have been built to run on stored energy in various forms, including:

- Fireless steam
- Compressed air, (see also Mekarski system)
- Electric storage batteries
