= Sedan–Corbion–Bouillon–Paliseul railway =

Railway line in France and Belgium

Coordinates: 49.69824°N 4.92844°E

Sedan–Corbion–Bouillon–Paliseul
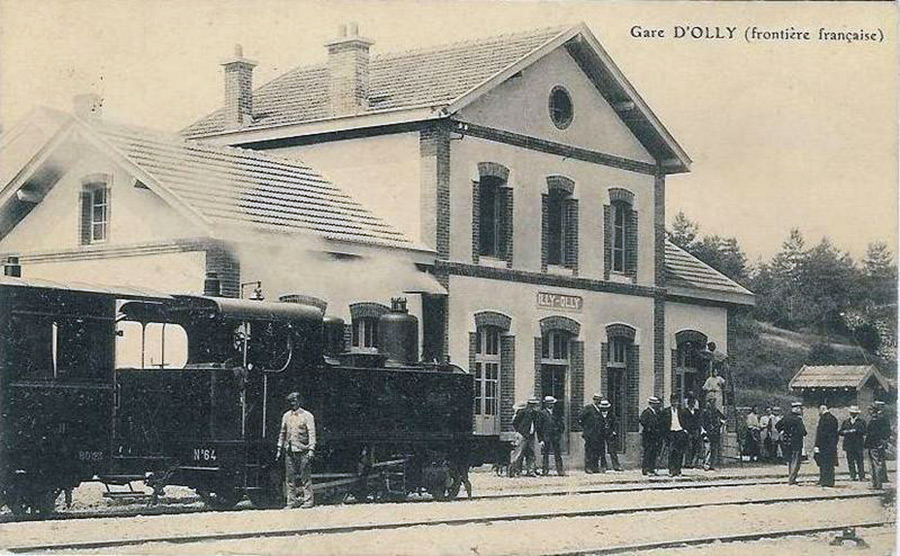
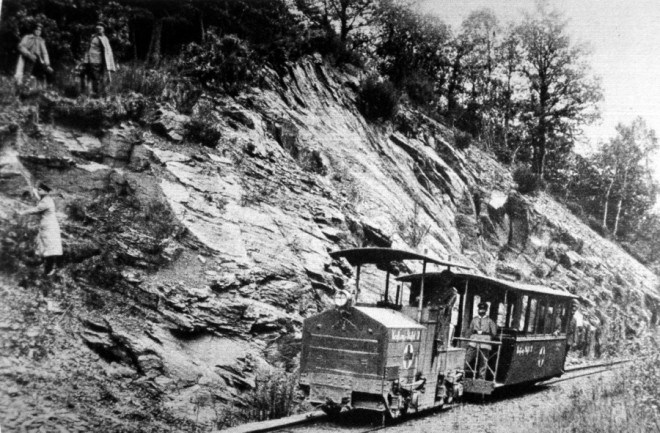
- Illy-Olly train station Ambulance train at the Rochers de la Hatrelle, 1916

Technical
- Line length: 44 km (27 mi)
- Track gauge: 1,000 mm (3 ft 3 3/8 in)
Route map
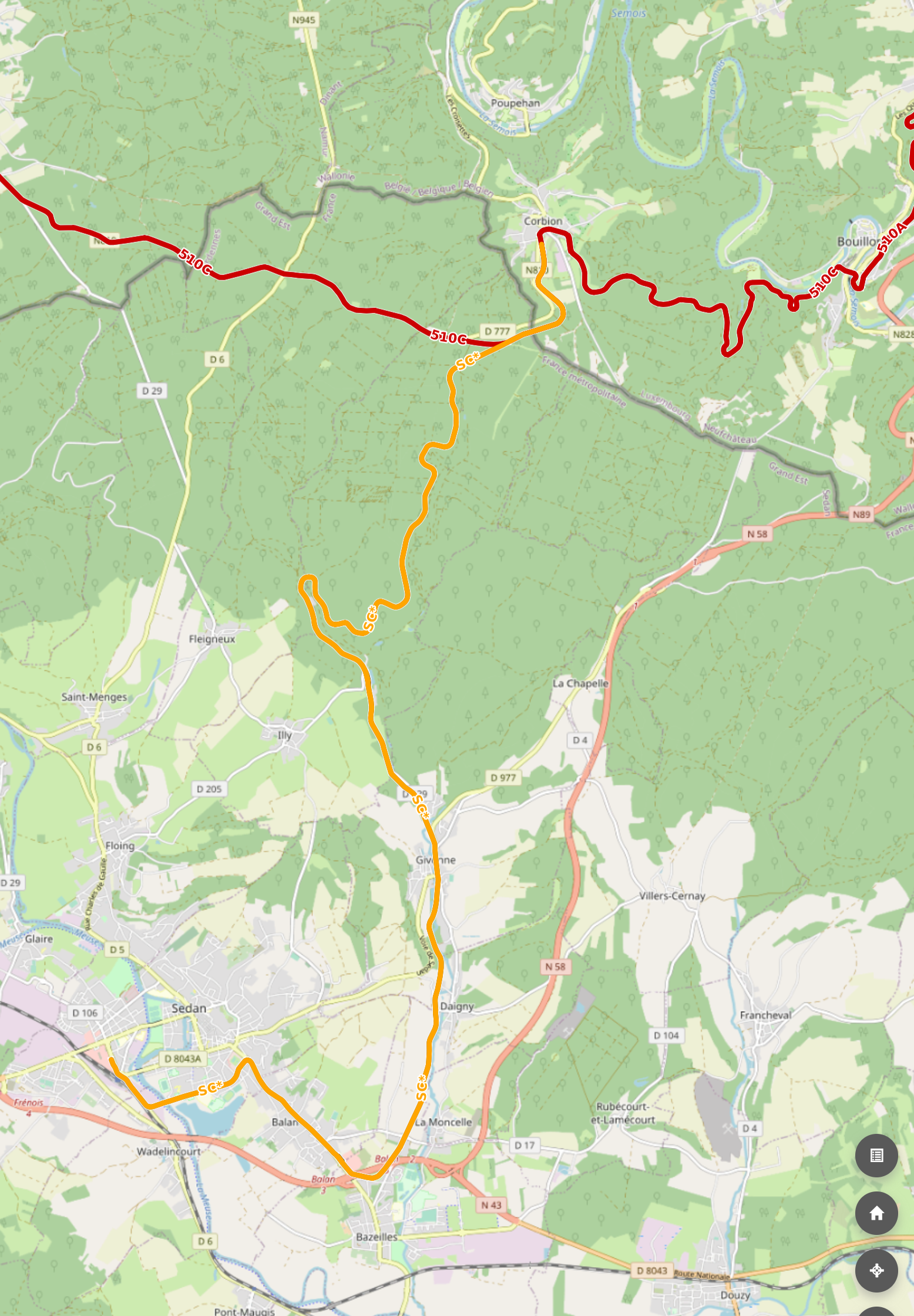
Former route of 1926 on a map of 2022
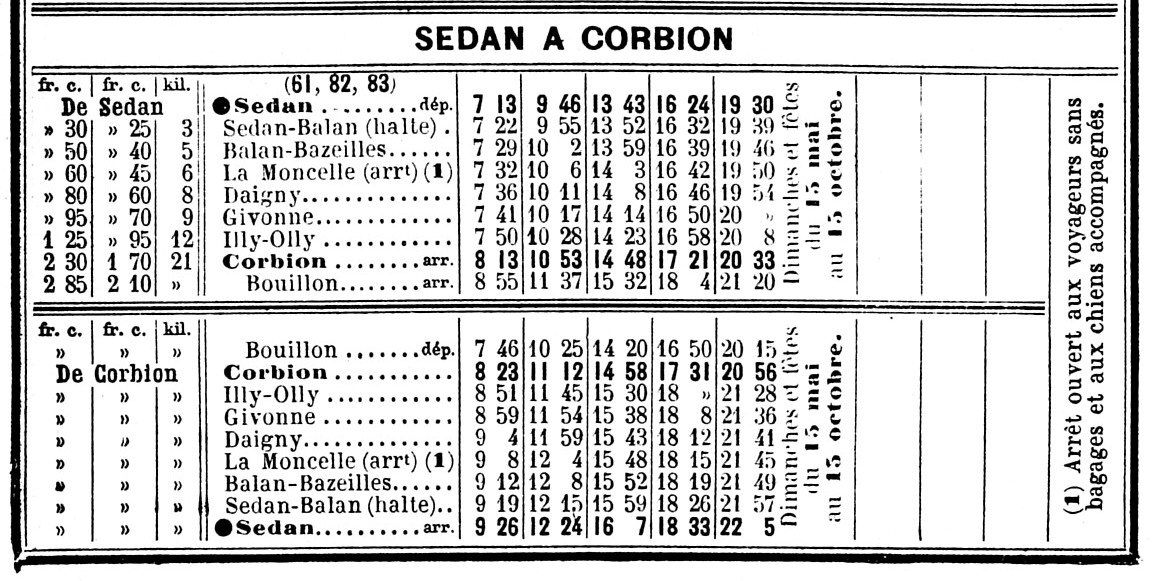
Time table for 1914

The Sedan–Corbion–Bouillon–Paliseul railway (French: La ligne du Bouillonais) was a 44 kilometres (27 mi) long cross-border metre gauge railway in northeastern France and southwestern Belgium, commissioned in sections from 1890 and operated until 1933 and 1957/1960, respectively.

== History ==
The French Sedan-Corbion section, also known as La Bouillonais, was built by the Chemins de fer départementaux des Ardennes in 1910 as a metre-gauge railway and operated until 1933.

The Belgian Bouillon-Paliseul section was 15.290 km long. It was concessioned on 18 December 1888 and put into service on 12 October 1890 by the Belgian National Company of Light Railways (Société nationale des chemins de fer vicinaux, SNCV). It followed the course of the roads from Noirefontaine to Menuchenet (today's N89) and from Menuchenet to Paliseul (today's N899) just west of the Menuchenet crossroads. The climb from Bouillon to Noirefontaine was on a separate, particularly winding route.

The intervening Corbion-Bouillon section passed through a tunnel and was opened in 1907. Passenger traffic ceased in 1957 and freight traffic in 1960.

== Bridges and Stations ==
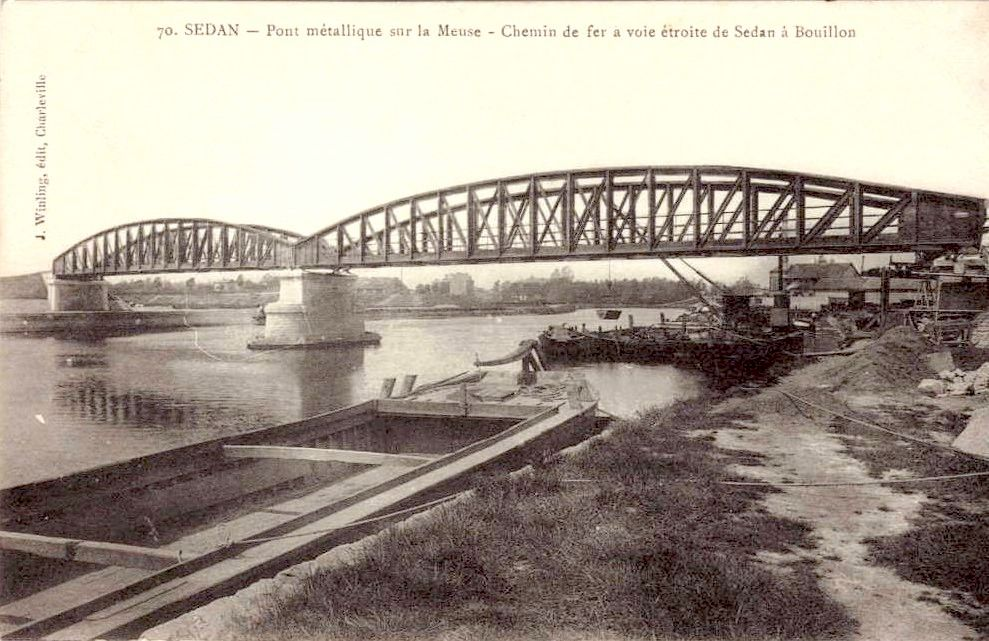
Bridge over the Meuse

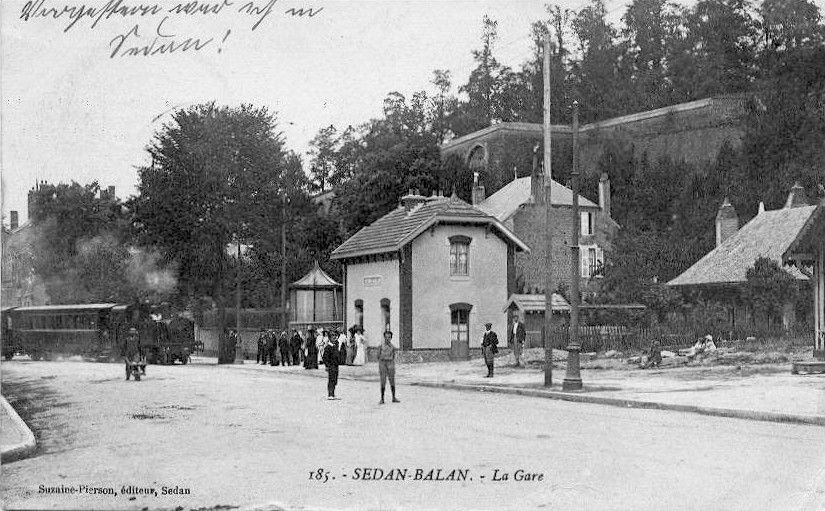
Sedan-Balan

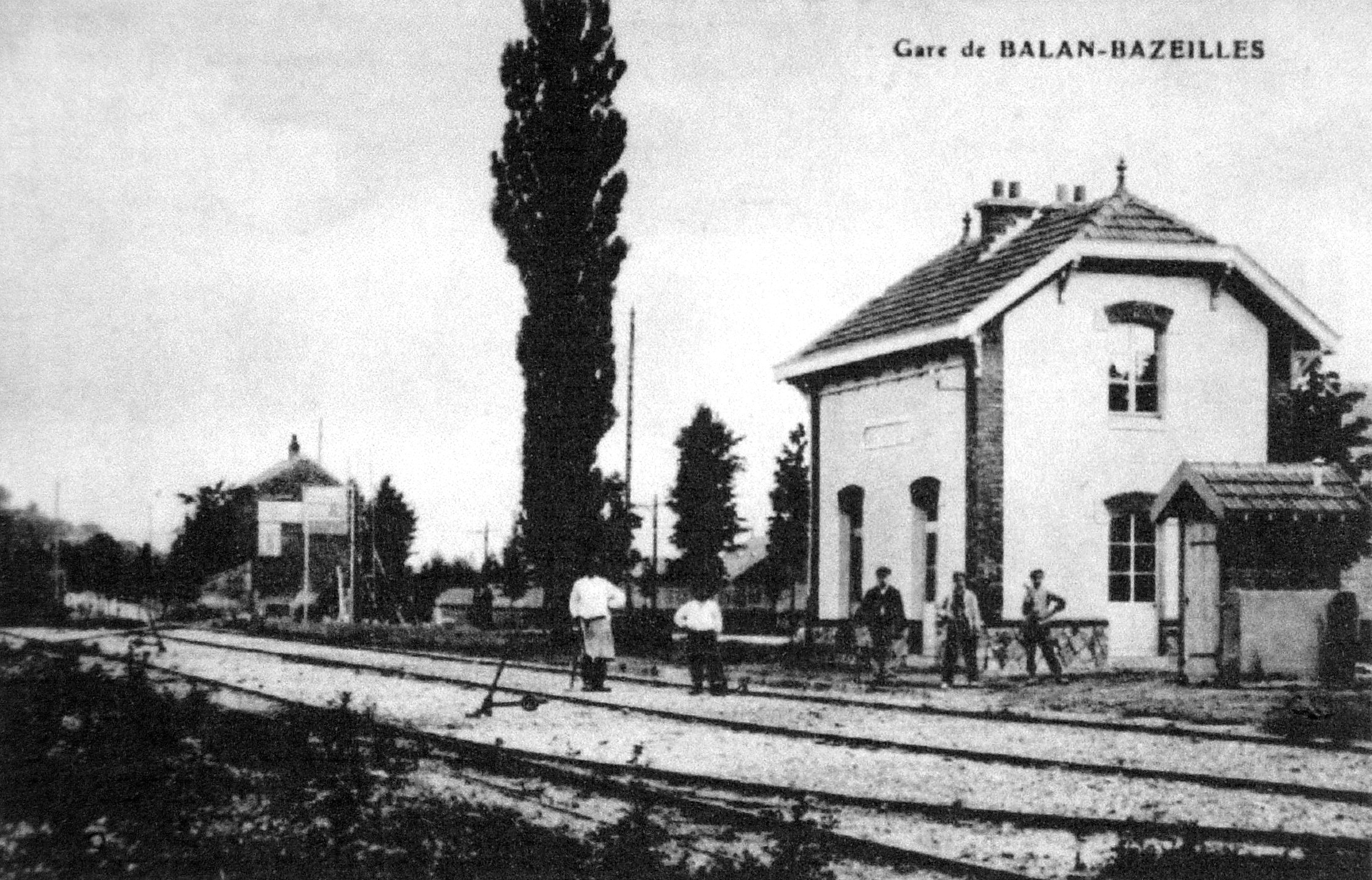
Balan-Bazeilles

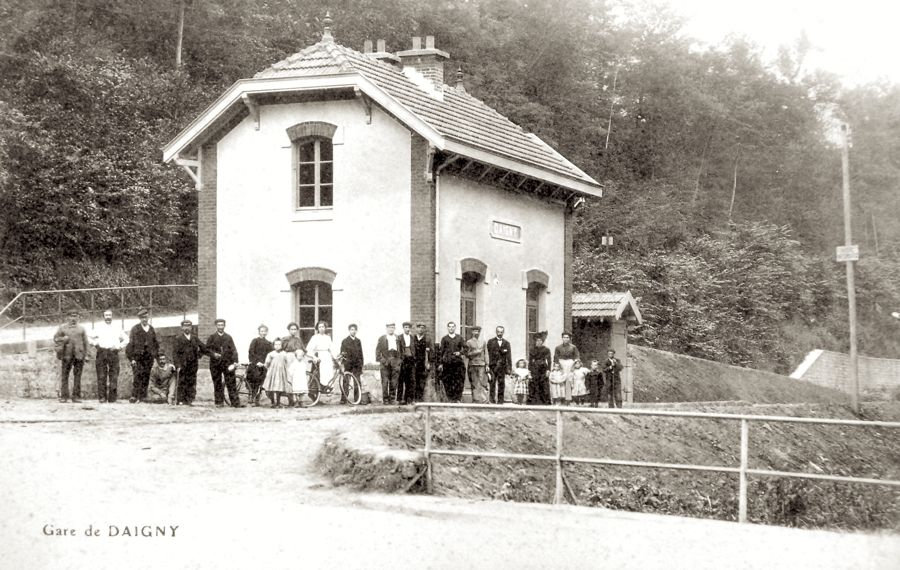
Daigny

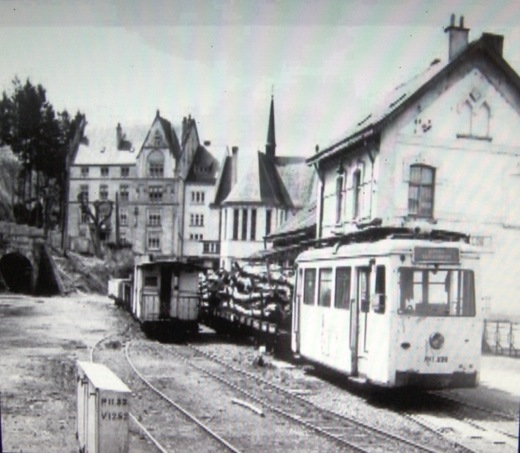
Bouillon

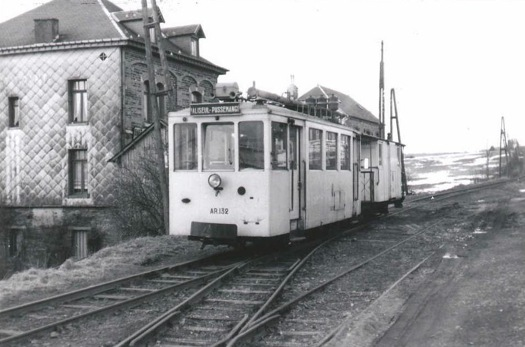
Noirefontaine

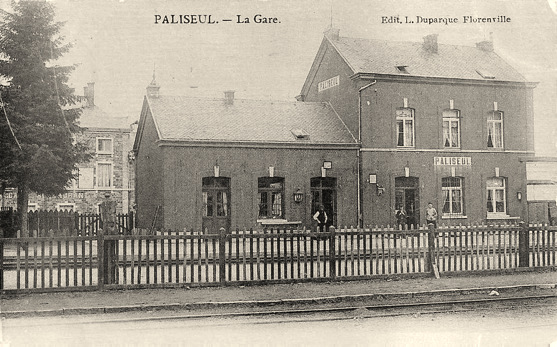
Paliseul

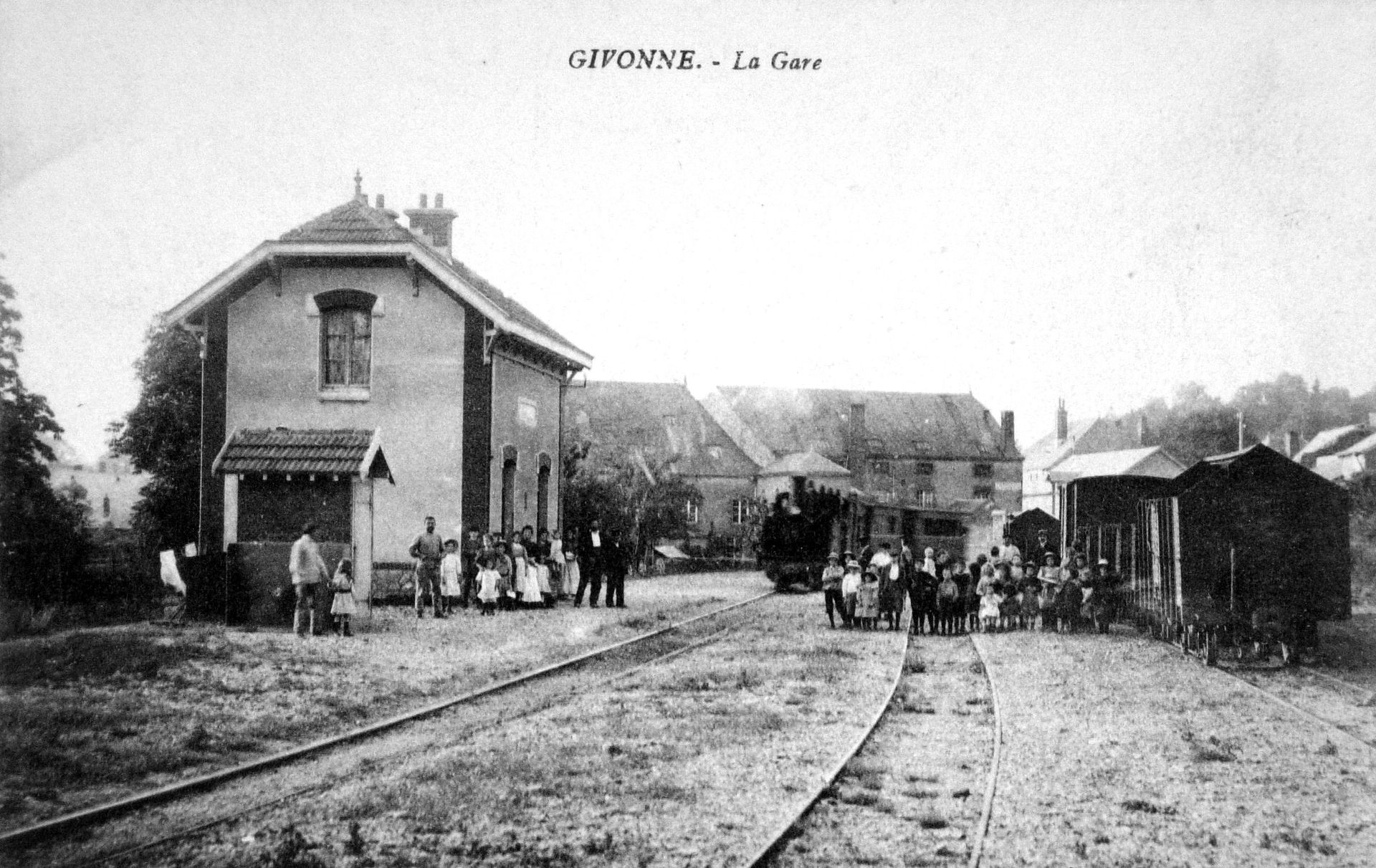
Givonne
