= Jef Valkeniers =

Flemish politician and physician

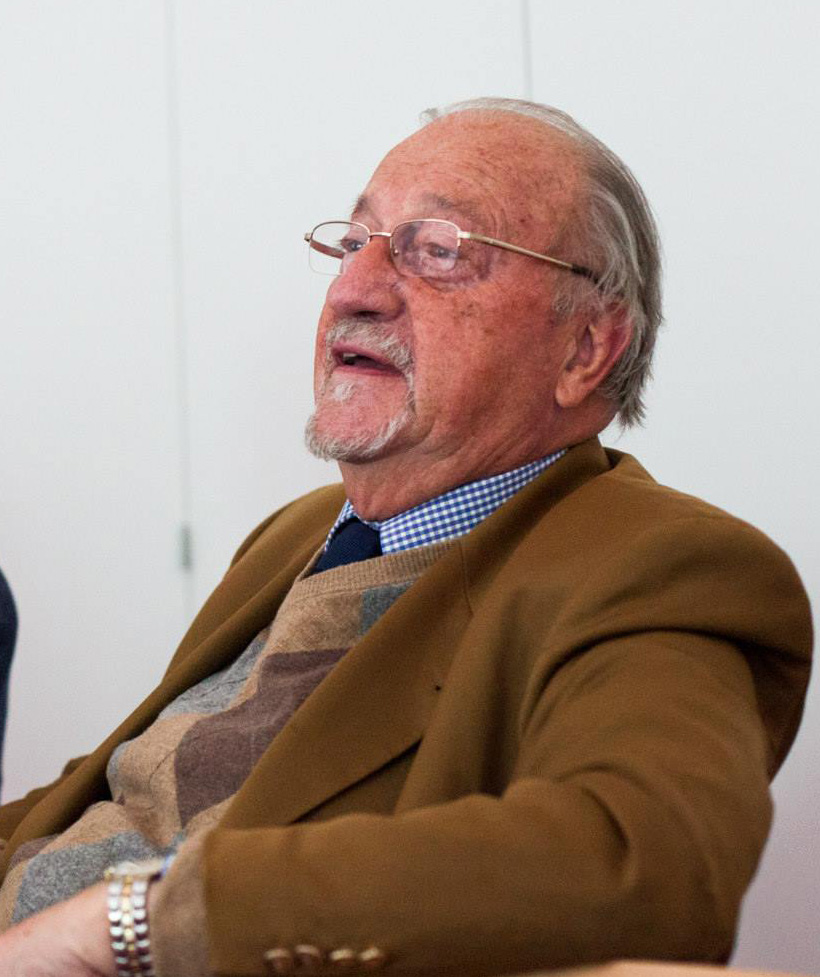

Personal details
- Born: 29 December 1932 (age 93) Schepdaal, Belgium
- Party: Anders
- Education: KU Leuven; Albany Medical College; University of Witwatersrand

Jozef Maria Zacharias "Jef" Valkeniers (born 29 December 1932) is a Belgian physician-neuropsychiatrist and a politician for Anders (formerly Open Flemish Liberals and Democrats).

== Biography ==
Jef Valkeniers was born on 29 December 1932 as the seventh child in a large brewer family. He grew up in Schepdaal where his grandfather Emiel Eylenbosch was mayor and brewer.

== Neuropsychiatrist ==
Valkeniers studied medicine at the Katholieke Universiteit Leuven. He did his internship at Ellis Hospital and took some additional classes at the Albany Medical College in The State of New York. After six years having worked as a practitioner in Schepdaal he moved with his family to South Africa in order to specialize in neurology at the University of Witwatersrand in Johannesburg. Four years later, he returned to Belgium and obtained a specialization in psychiatry at St. Jans Hospital in Bruges.

== Politics ==
Valkeniers was Member of Parliament from 1974 to 2003. As a Dutch-speaking member of parliament, he was also a member of the Flemish Cultural Council (forerunner of the Flemish Parliament). He was also briefly, in 1988, Minister for the Brussels Region. Finally, he was mayor of Schepdaal and Dilbeek. Dr Valkeniers was known during his years as a Member of Parliament as an active member and as a hard worker.

=== Political career ===
- 1970 - 1976 : Mayor of Schepdaal.
- 1976 - 1988 : Councillor Dilbeek.
- 1974 - 1985 : Member of the Chamber of Representatives.
- 1974 - 1995 : Member of the Flemish Council
- 1985 - 1995 : Member of the Senate
- 1988 - 1989 : Secretary of State for the Brussels region
- 1995 - 1999 : Member of the Council of Europe
- 1995 - 1999 : Member of the Western European Union
- 1995 - 2003 : Member of the Chamber of Representatives.
- 1982 - 1988 : Mayor of Dilbeek
- 1992–present : Municipal Councillor in Dilbeek
- 2001 - 2002 : President of the Public Centre for Social Welfare in Dilbeek

Valkeniers is currently dealing with development, he serves on several boards of directors, and he is regularly asked for medical advice (E.g. NPO De Poel.). He is still active in politics as a councilor in Dilbeek and as a board member of the Flemish liberal party. He continues to actively work for the fraternization between Dilbeek with some foreign countries. He was a few years ago, the initiator of the cooperation between the HUBrussel and the Dalton State College.

== Honours ==
- Belgium: Knight of the Order of Crown (1971).
- South Africa: Sieradres van Franschhoek (1999).
- Belgium: Grand Cross of the Order of Leopold (2000).
- Austria: Order of Merit of the Republic of Austria (2000).
- Taiwan: Great Medal of Diplomacy from Taiwan (2003).
- Belgium: Freeman Affligem.
- Belgium: Honorary Mayor of Dilbeek (2003).
