= ASVi museum =

Tramway museum in Thuin, Belgium

Coordinates: 50°20′26.34″N 4°16′46.97″E

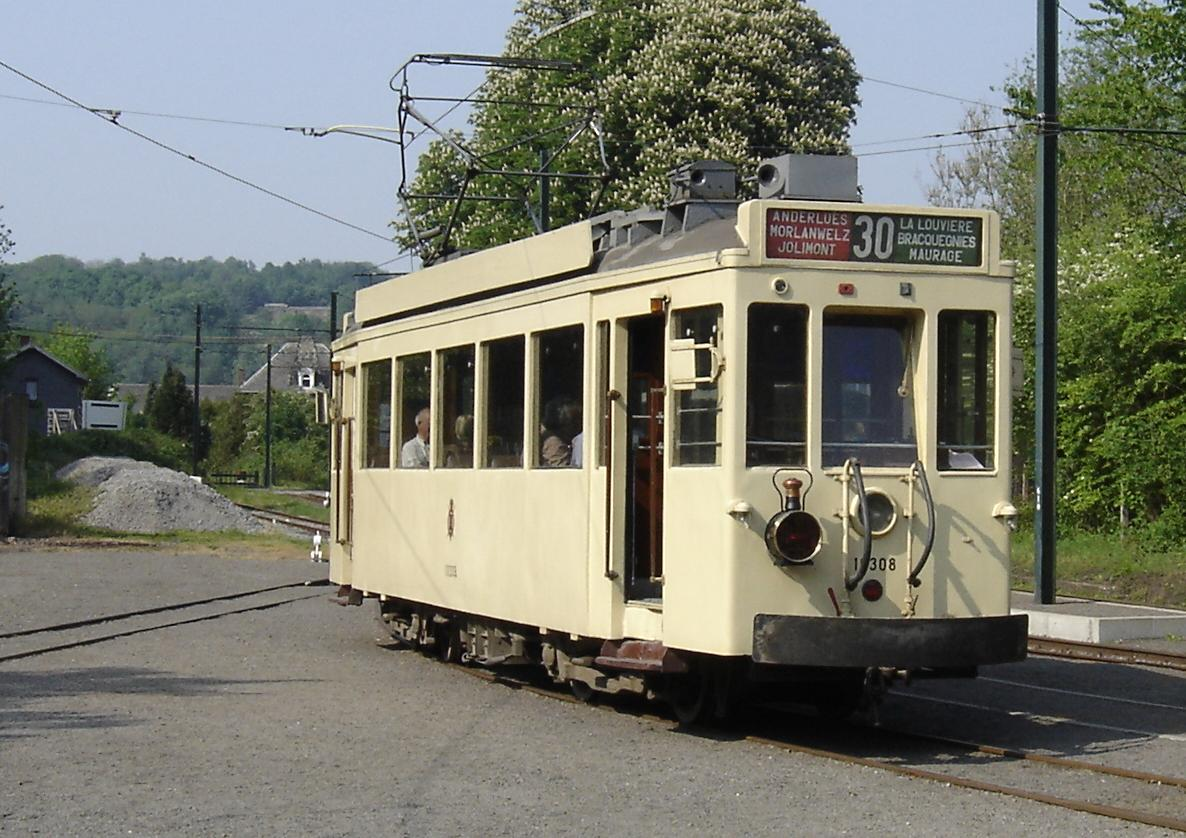
10308 "Standard Métallique" maneuvering at the museum

Tram map of Tramway Lobbes Thuin

The ASVi is a tramway museum in Thuin in Belgium, which specialises in the history of the Belgian narrow gauge Vicinal system. The museum includes an operating museum tram line which runs from Thuin to Lobbes.

The metre gauge historic tram line is made of two sections :

- a part of the former vicinal tramway line Thuin - Anderlues (lines 91 and 92). This line was part of the famous and extensive Belgian vicinal tramway network which once covered the whole country;
- a part of the SNCB normal gauge line (line 109 Mons - Chimay) which was converted to metric gauge and equipped with an overhead line for power supply.

== Description of the historic line ==
Leaving the Thuin museum, the line first follows the former SNCB line, then the Avenue de la Couture towards the cemetery of Thuin and a bridge over the Sambre. It then runs parallel to the SNCB railway to Lobbes Pont du Nord where it crosses Route Nationale 559. Then it loops round the western side of Lobbes to reach the Lobbes Hôtel de Ville stop. From there, the line turns again towards RN 559 to reach it at the Lobbes Entreville stop; from there the line is on the west side of this road to the terminus of Lobbes Bonniers. This northern section is one of the last electrified roadside sections of tramway which remains in Belgium.

From Avenue de la Couture, a section of the former vicinal runs down Grand'Rue to the lower part of Thuin on the banks of Sambre.

In August 2010, a 3 km extension to Biesme-sous-Thuin was inaugurated. It follows the trackbed of the former SNCB line from Mons to Chimay.

== Rolling stock ==
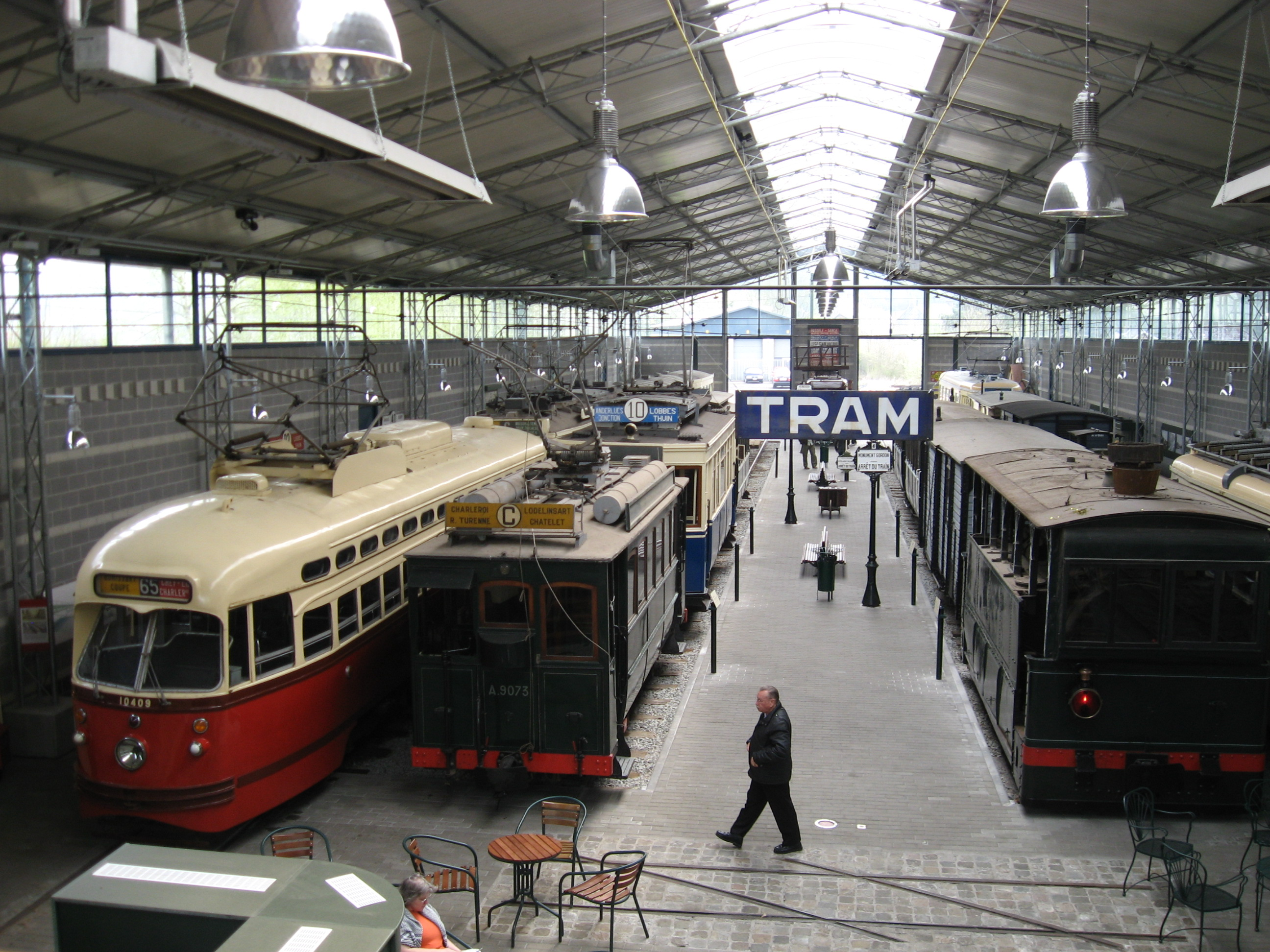
In the museum - from left to right, 10409 "PCC", A.9073 and HL303

The collection also includes a PCC streetcar which has quite an uncommon story. It is part of a first series of 24 cars built for Belgium in 1950, which were transferred to Belgrade in 1960. One model of this iconic vehicle was brought back to Belgium in 1986.

=== In working order ===
ASVi #	Type	Manufacturer	Year	
AR.86	Railcar	SNCV Brabant	1934	AR.86
ART.300	Railcar	SNCV Andenne	1947	
A.9073	M2	Electricité et Hydraulique	1901	A.9073
A.9515	M2	Le Rœulx	1918	A.9515
9924	M2	La Dyle à Louvain	1931	9924
9974 "Type SE"	M4	SNCV Brabant	1958	9974 "Type SE"
10284 "Type Eugies"	M4	Braine-le-Comte	1936	
10308 "Standard Métallique"	M4	Baume et Marpent	1942	10308 "Standard Métallique"
10409 "PCC"	M4	La Brugeoise & Nicaise & Delcuve	1949	10409 "PCC"
10480 "Type N"	M4	SNCV Cureghem	1954	10480 "Type N"
HL303	Type 7	La Métallurgique à Tubize	1888	HL303
A.9385 "Type Manage"	M2	Franco-Belge	1910	
9063 "Type S"	M4	SNCV Brabant	1956	

=== Out of order ===
ASVi #	Type	Manufacturer	Year	Condition
9598	M2	SNCV Eugies	1951	To be restored
9603	M2	Seneffe	1919	To be restored
9888	M2	Franco-Belge à La Croyère	1930	Under restoration
9963 "Fourgon-moteur"	M2	Godarville	1916	Under restoration
9984 "Standard Bois"	M4	Braine-le-Comte	1932	To be restored
10393 "BLC"	M4	Braine-le-Comte	1949	To be restored
