= Tramsite Schepdaal =

Tramway museum Schepdaal
- Trammuseum Schepdaal
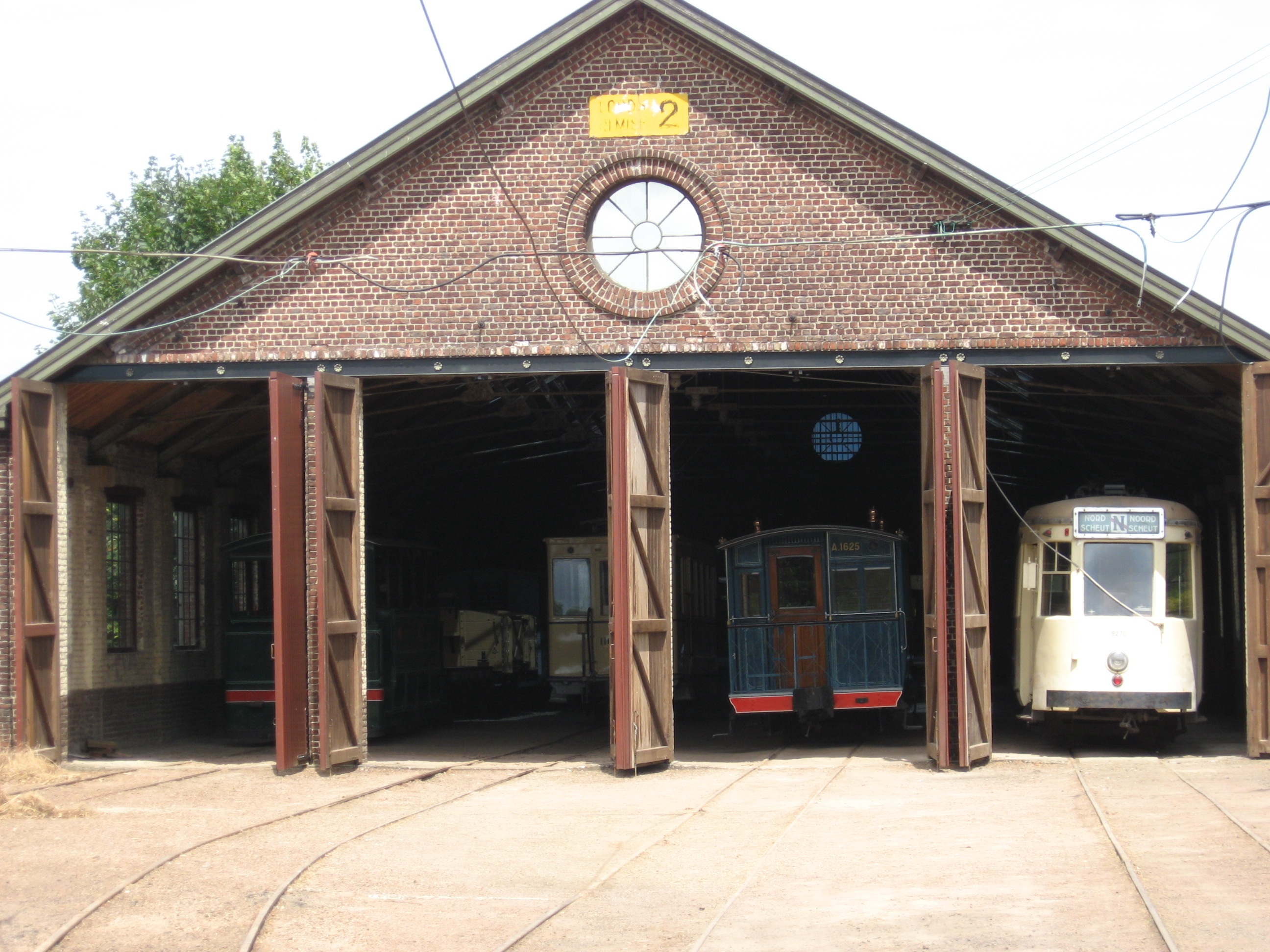
- The Museum Hall
- Established: May 5, 1962
- Location: Schepdaal, Dilbeek, Flanders, Belgium
- Coordinates: 50.8390°N 4.1959°E
- Type: Transport museum
- Website: Tramsite Schepdaal

The Tramsite Schepdaal is a tramway museum in Schepdaal, located in the Belgian municipality Dilbeek, west of Brussels

== History ==
The vicinal tramway line going from Ninove to Brussels Ninoofsepoort starts operating on September 8, 1887. It used metre-gauge rails and had its depot in Schepdaal. This depot became the national museum for the vicinal tramway on May 5, 1962, but was still used as depot for the line Brussels-Ninove (line Ni) too until 1968. The line was abolished on February 21, 1970.

The whole site (station building and engine houses) became protected in 1993. The museum was managed by volunteers and closed for renovation in 1999, only to be reopened ten years later (July 1, 2009) by the non-profit association "Erfgoed Vlaanderen".

A lot of work remains to be done, like the re-electrification of the grounds of the depot and the renewal of the tracks and switches, to enable short rides with the carriages.

== Site ==
Tram locomotives and carriages are kept in 3 depots

- Depot 1 has vehicles that fit the standard-gauge railways.
- Depot 2 is the biggest of 3 and has steam and electrical locomotives and passenger carriages, as well as freight vehicles. Also several historical artifacts related to the tramway's history are kept there on display.
- Depot 3 is used as workshop for maintenance and restoration purposes.

The rest of the site is kept in original condition and are (or will be) open to visitors;

- Station (building), where people were able to buy tram tickets and wait for their tram. Also used to house the family of the stationchief; kitchen, desk, lavatory, toilets, sleeping rooms. The workers on late or early shift also were allowed to sleep there. Nowadays this is either used for storage, visitor reception and ticketing, a small shop and up for future display, after more restoration.
- Weigh bridge
- Water tower and pump to fill the vehicles that run on steam
- Wood and sand warehouse; those materials were used to put on tracks when it was freezing or raining
- Coal warehouse
- Forge
- Lamp warehouse

== Collection ==
The majority of the historic vehicles is displayed in depot 2. The main showpiece is the royal carriage once built for King Leopold II of Belgium. It remains a mystery if the King ever actually used the vehicle, but it is certain that the Shah of Persia used it when he visited Ostend in 1900.

Several electrical vehicles dating back to 1894 (NMVB) and one of the last steam vehicles dating back to 1920.

== Gallery ==
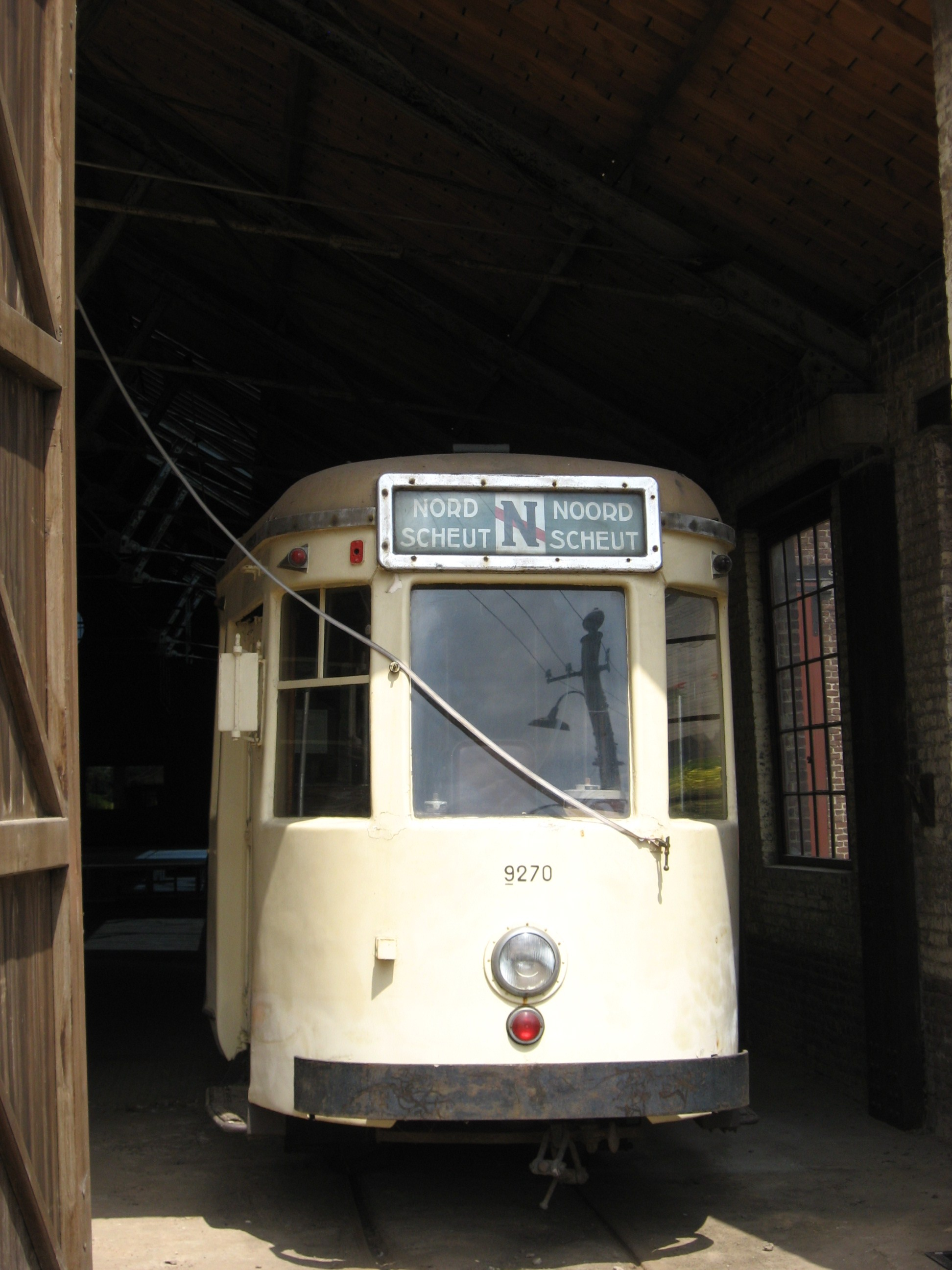
NMVB-locomotive type N from Brussels

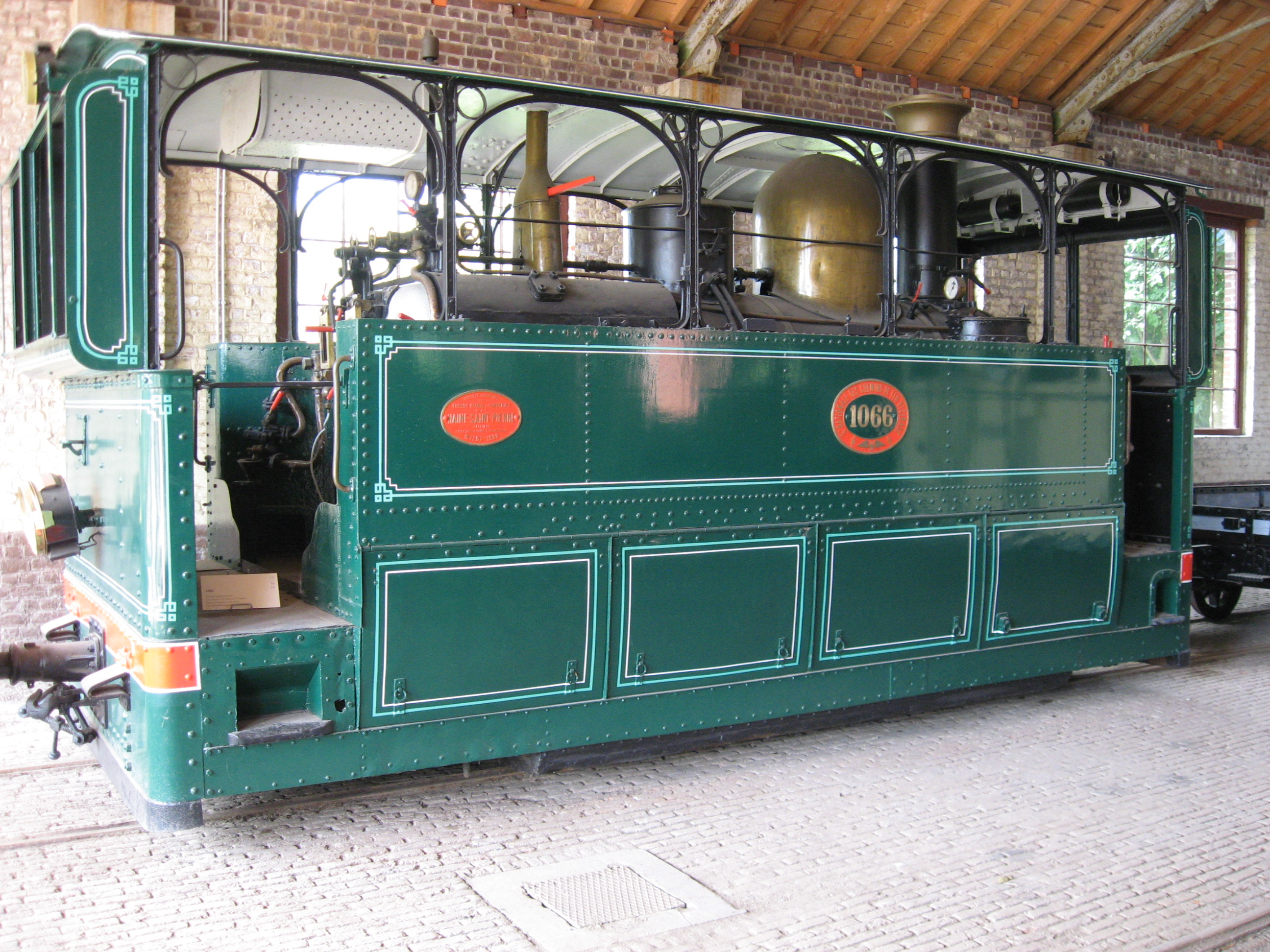
Steam tram
