= Watermill Sint-Gertrudis-Pede =

Watermill in Dilbeek, Belgium

Coordinates: 50°49′31″N 4°12′37″E

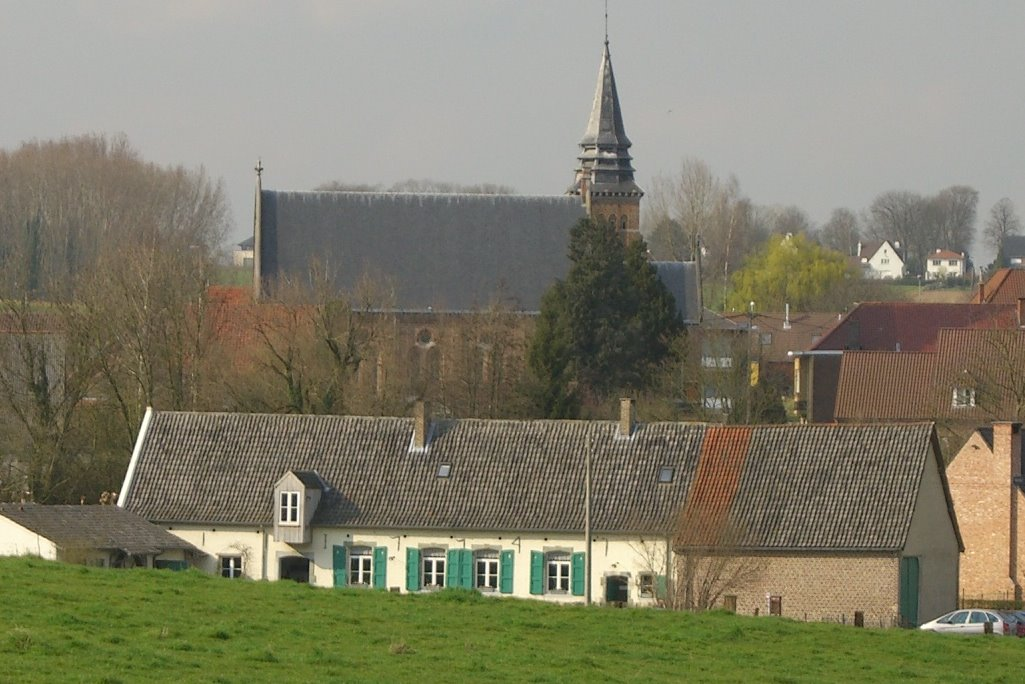
View of the village, with the watermill

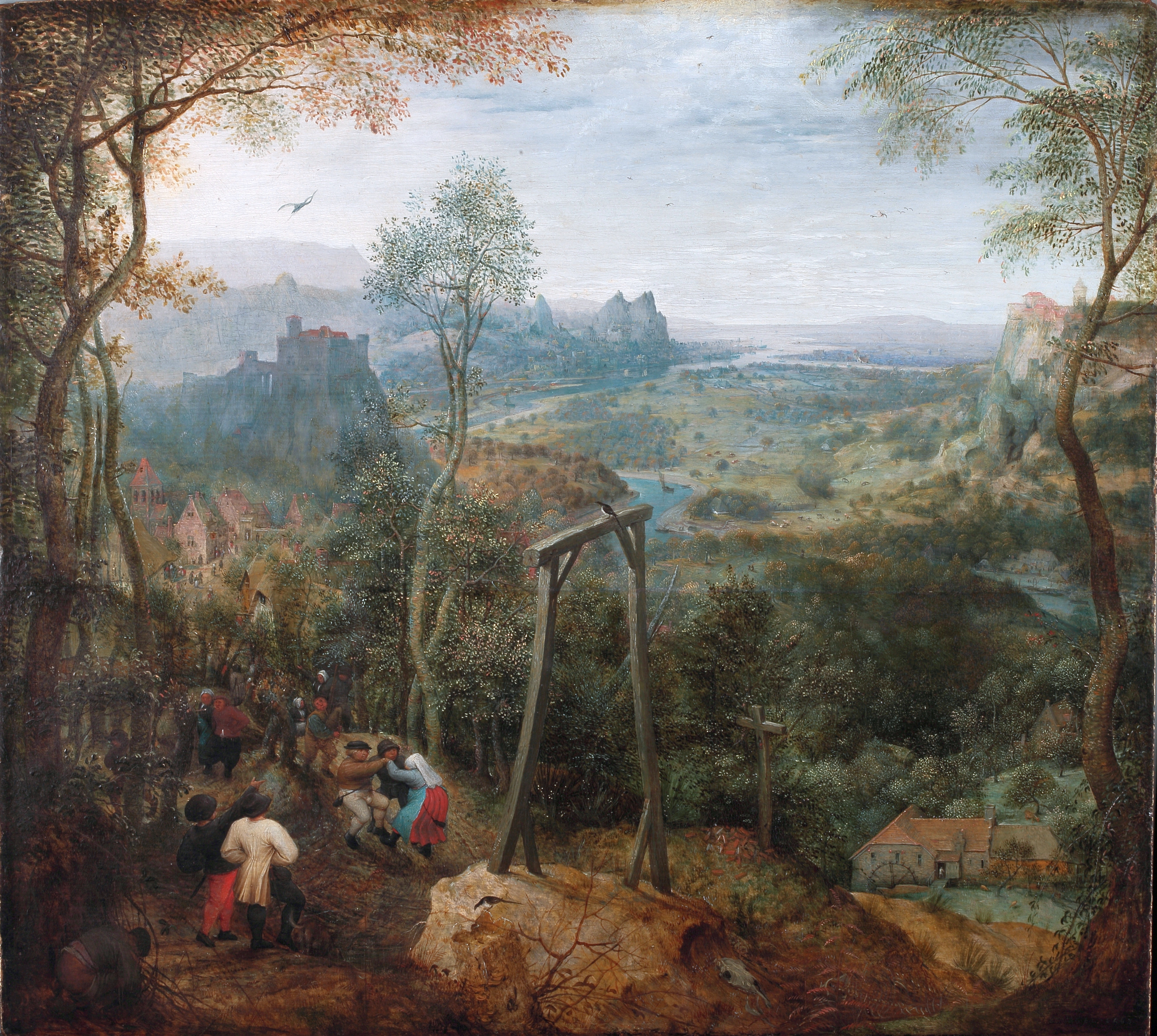
The magpie on the gallows, with the mill on the lower right side

The watermill at Sint-Gertrudis-Pede (Pedemolen) in the municipality of Dilbeek is the only working watermill in the Pajottenland, and is protected as a monument since 1975

== History ==
The original mill, built in 1392 was one of the five mills in the Land of Gaasbeek. After being destroyed by a fire in 1763, the mill was restored. Also living quarters were added. Until 1963, they kept milling with water power, after that they used an electric engine. The mill was completely shut down in 1970. In 1990 restoration was begun, so nowadays it still can be used as a mill.

== Current use ==
Today the monument only is used as a tourist attraction, with volunteers milling two Sundays every month. Apart from the mill, there are several ponds and an orchard located on the domain.

The first depictions of the mill date back to the 16th century, after Pieter Bruegel the Elder used the mill as a model for his paintings The Return of the Herd and The Magpie on the Gallows.
