= Technical Theatre Awards =

- Awarded for: Excellence in technical theatre industry
- Country: United Kingdom
- First award: 2013
- Website: www.technicaltheatreawards.com

The Technical Theatre Awards (TTA) were created in 2013 by Olivia Dermot Walsh. The intention is to provide the theatre and events industries with a series of awards, to provide recognition for the work and achievements of technical theatre individuals over the past year.

Nominations can be submitted by anyone, whether they are performers, companies or an individual. Voting on the nominees runs June–August, with the awards presented in a ceremony at the closing of the PLASA Show exhibition in September.

== Awards ==
Awards are often sponsored by companies within the industry. Companies can choose to sponsor an award in their particular area of interest, or one that is not normally affiliated with the company.

In the past, sponsoring companies have included Philips Entertainment, Production Resource Group (PRG), Triple E and Theatres Trust.

=== Current Awards ===
- The "Rigging Team" Award for Outstanding Achievement in Automation
- The "Robe" Hire Company Team of the Year Award
- The "Design Software Solutions" Award for Outstanding Achievement in Education
- The "Triple E" Award for Outstanding Achievement in Flys & Rigging
- The "Philips Entertainment" Award for Outstanding Achievement in Lighting
- The "PRG" Award for Outstanding Achievement in Production Management
- The Award for Outstanding Achievement in Prop Making
- The "SNP Productions" Award for Outstanding Achievement in Media Server Programming
- The "Total Solutions Group" Award for Outstanding Achievement in Set Construction
- The Award for Outstanding Achievement in Scenic Artistry
- The "Douglas Turnbull" Award for Outstanding Achievement in Company Management
- The “d&b audiotechnik” Award for Outstanding Achievement in Sound
- The Award for Outstanding Achievement in Stage Crew
- The "GDS" Award for Outstanding Achievement in Stage Management
- The Award for Outstanding Achievement in Wardrobe
- The "Charcoalblue" Award for Venue Sustainability
- The "Pigs Might Fly South" Award for Outstanding Achievement in Wigs & Makeup

=== Discontinued Awards ===
- The Award for Outstanding Achievement in Performer Flying – 2014 only

== See also ==
List of awards in theatre
