= Sint-Gertrudis-Pede =

Village in Dilbeek, Belgium

Coordinates: 50°49′35″N 4°12′34″E

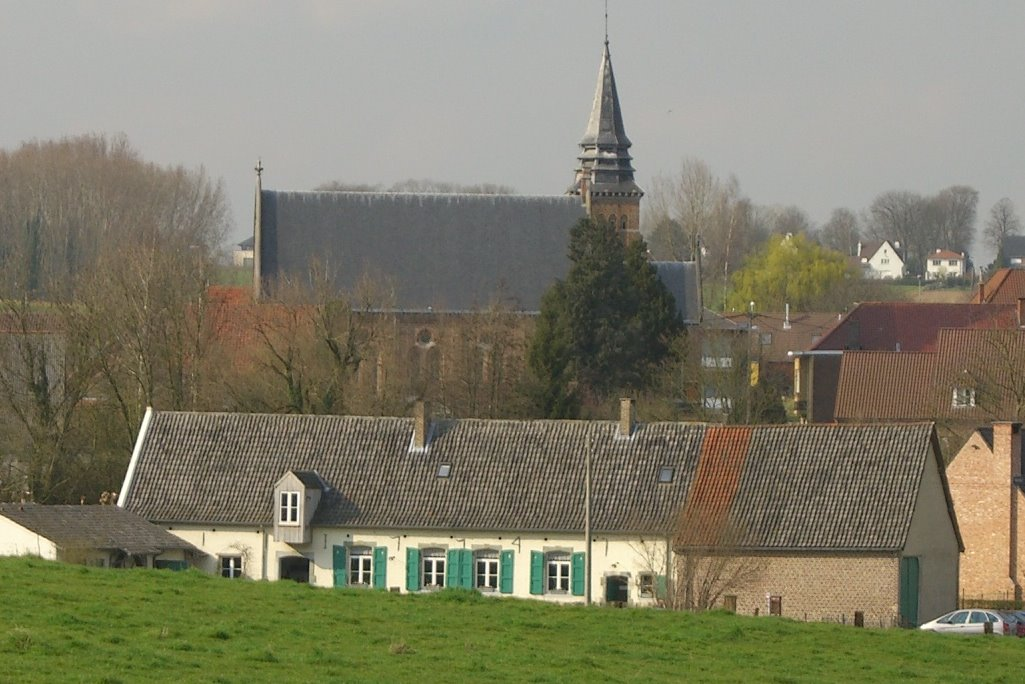
View of the village, with the watermill

Sint-Gertrudis-Pede is a village in Dilbeek.

== Toponymy ==
According to local legend, Gertrude of Nivelles, abbess of Nivelles Abbey, was on her way to Lennik when her carriage became stuck in the mud. Therefore, she was obliged to continue her journey on foot. The name Pede would come from the Latin for "on foot".

== History ==
Sint-Gertrudis-Pede grew around the place where different streams came together to form the Pedebeek, of which the largest is the Laarbeek. Around these streams were three large farms, who originally depended on the abbey of Nijvel, and later on Gaasbeek.

The village never became an independent municipality, however this almost was the case. On 19 May 1893 the motion to create the municipality of Sint-Getrudis-Pede was accepted in the Chamber of Representatives, but was rejected by the Senate. In 1890 it became an independent parish, stretching over the borders of the municipalities of Schepdaal, Itterbeek, Sint-Martens-Lennik and Vlezenbeek.

In 1977 it became part of the municipality of Dilbeek.

== Attractions ==
- Watermill
- Pedebeek
- Sint-Gertrudis Church
- Pedemole footpath

== Famous inhabitants ==
- Urbanus, Flemish comedian
