= Tetradecylthioacetic acid =

Names
- Preferred IUPAC name (Tetradecylsulfanyl)acetic acid
- Other names 1-(Carboxymethylthio)tetradecane

Identifiers
CAS Number	2921-20-2
3D model (JSmol)	Interactive image
Abbreviations	TTA; CMTD
ChemSpider	102869
PubChem CID	114924
UNII	7ZU5I25S2O
CompTox Dashboard (EPA)	DTXSID0040759
- InChI: InChI=1S/C16H32O2S/c1-2-3-4-5-6-7-8-9-10-11-12-13-14-19-15-16(17)18/h2-15H2,1H3,(H,17,18) Key: IPBCWPPBAWQYOO-UHFFFAOYSA-N; InChI=1/C16H32O2S/c1-2-3-4-5-6-7-8-9-10-11-12-13-14-19-15-16(17)18/h2-15H2,1H3,(H,17,18) Key: IPBCWPPBAWQYOO-UHFFFAOYAU
- SMILES: O=C(O)CSCCCCCCCCCCCCCC

Properties
Chemical formula	C_{16}H_{32}O_{2}S
Molar mass	288.49 g·mol^{−1}
- Except where otherwise noted, data are given for materials in their standard state (at 25 °C [77 °F], 100 kPa). Infobox references

Tetradecylthioacetic acid (TTA) is a synthetic fatty acid used as a nutritional supplement.

TTA acts as a peroxisome proliferator-activated receptor alpha (PPARα) agonist and increases mitochondrial fatty acid oxidation in vitro. In rodent studies, TTA has been reported to have other activities such as reducing inflammation and preventing high fat diet induced adiposity and insulin resistance.

In human clinical study, there have been mixed observations in preliminary studies. One Phase I study showed no significant changes in the blood lipids or free fatty acids and another showed that TTA attenuates dyslipidemia in patients with type 2 diabetes mellitus.
