= Tramway touristique de l'Aisne =

Coordinates: 50°17′19.49″N 5°32′54.58″E

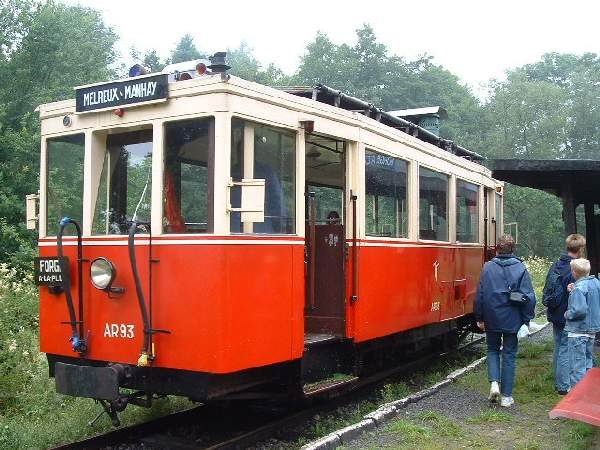
TTA's model AR 93 vicinal tramway

Current network (as of 2015)

The Tramway touristique de l'Aisne (French pronunciation: [tʁamwɛ tuʁistik də lɛn], Aisne Tourist Tramway) is the official designation of the tourist use of a former rural vicinal tramway in Belgium.

The line is the oldest and longest tramway in the province of Luxembourg, between Érezée and Dochamps. It is a 1,000 mm (3 ft 3 3/8 in) gauge line along the Aisne river.

The extension from Forge à la Plez and Dochamps to Lamorménil was opened by Prince Laurent of Belgium on 21 June 2015.

== See also ==
- Tram
- Vicinal tramway • Belgian Coast Tram • Tram de Han
- List of town tramway systems in Belgium
