= National Company of Light Railways =

Belgian state-owned transportation provider

- Coat of arms of the National Company of Light Railways

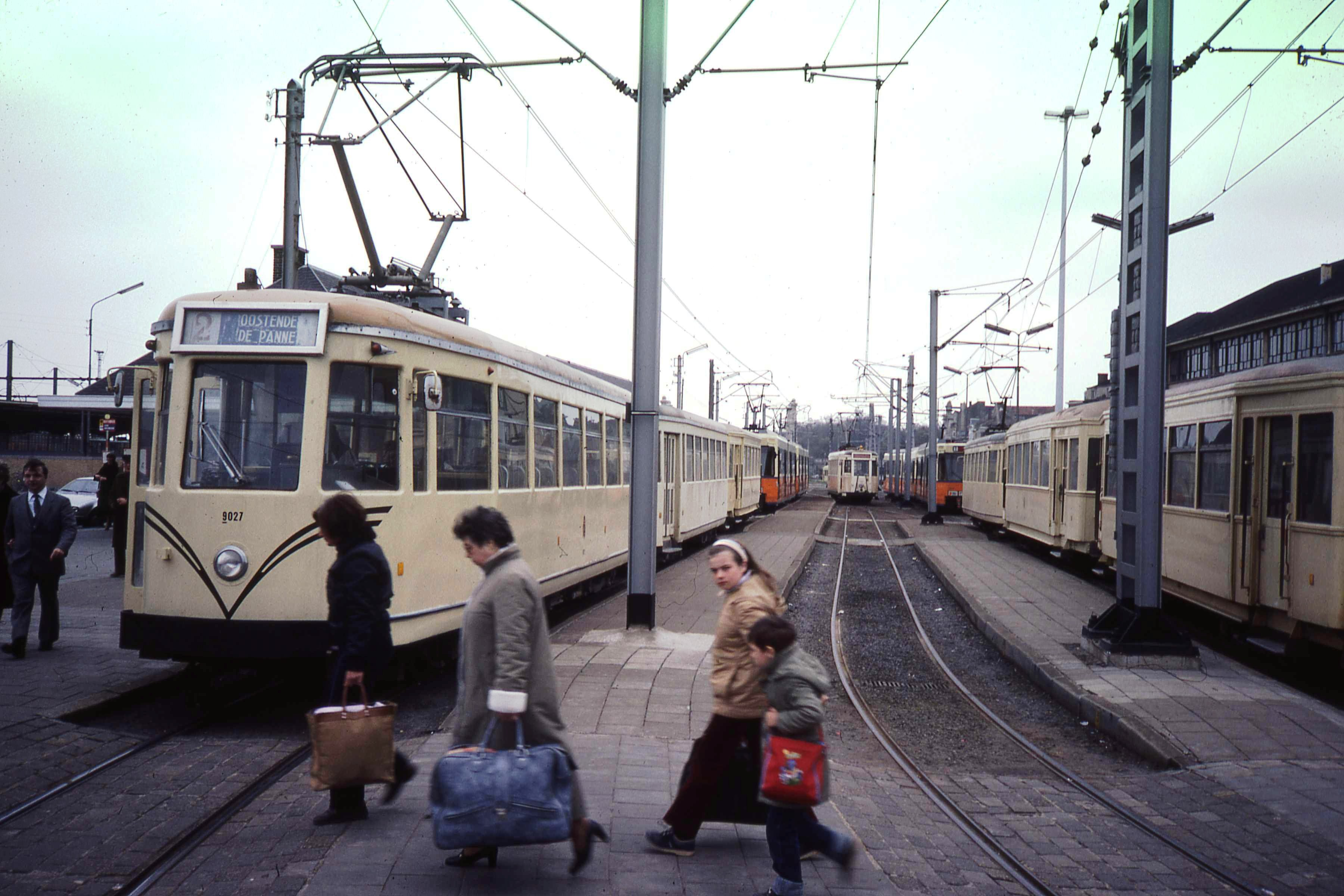
- Tram in Ostend, 1982

Overview
- Native name: Nationale Maatschappij Van Buurtspoorwegen (NMVB); Société Nationale des Chemins de fer Vicinaux (MIVB); Nationale Kleinbahngesellschaft (NKG)
- Locale: Belgium
- Transit type: tramway, railway

Operation
- Began operation: May 29, 1884
- Ended operation: December 31, 1991

The National Company of Light Railways (Dutch: Nationale Maatschappij Van Buurtspoorwegen, (Note: Dutch pronunciation: [nɑ(t)ɕoːˈnaːlə ˌmaːtsxɑˈpɛi vɑm ˈbyːrtspoːrˌʋeːɣə(n)].) abbreviated as NMVB; French: Société Nationale des Chemins de fer Vicinaux, (Note: French pronunciation: [sɔsjete nɑsjɔnal de ʃ(ə)mɛ̃ də fɛʁ visino].) abbreviated as SNCV) was a state-owned transportation provider which comprised a system of narrow-gauge tramways or local railways in Belgium, which covered the whole country, including the countryside, and had a greater route length than the mainline railway system. They were 1,000 mm (3 ft 3 3/8 in) metre gauge and included electrified city lines and rural lines using steam locomotives and diesel railcars; half the system was electrified.

The company gradually switched to buses and dismantled the tram tracks. Only the coastal line, the Charleroi light rail system, and the short line to the caves at Han-sur-Lesse are still in commercial use; four museums hold significant collections of rolling stock, including the museum at Schepdaal and the ASVi museum in Thuin. The longest (11 km (6.8 mi)) and oldest (40 years) tourist tramway is the Tramway Touristique de l'Aisne (TTA), between Érezée and Dochamps. A sponsoring group called "Tramania" has supported various tramway preservation initiatives for 13 years, in particular by financing the construction of the Thuin museum and car restoration for TTA.

== History ==
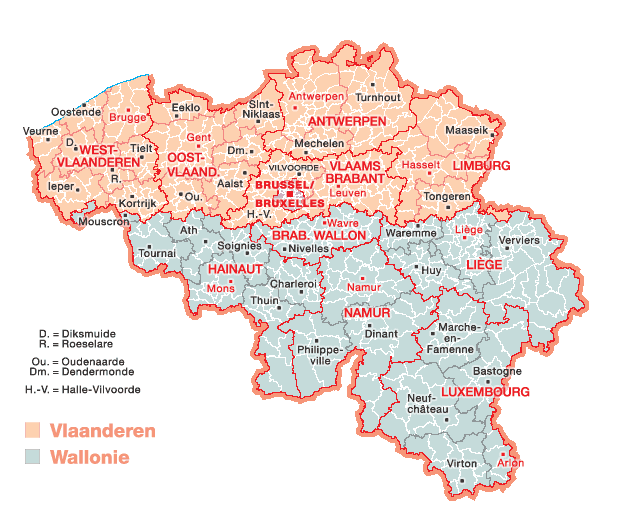
Map of Belgium, its districts and major cities

Legislation allowing the construction of rural tramways was passed in 1875, followed by a new law in 1885. The result was the creation of the nationwide operator named "National Company of Light Railways", known as Nationale Maatschappij van Buurtspoorwegen (NMVB) in Dutch and Société Nationale des Chemins de fer Vicinaux (SNCV) in French. The majority of lines were 1,000 mm (3 ft 3 3/8 in) metre gauge, although until 1921 many in the Antwerp metropolitan area were 1,067 mm (3 ft 6 in) gauge, later re-gauged. Many lines were built alongside roads, and carried considerable quantities of freight (especially timber and agricultural produce) as well as passengers.

World War I and World War II saw greatly increased traffic despite some wartime damage. The non-electric network reached a peak of approximately 3,938 kilometres (2,447 mi) in 1925, but soon parts started to close as usage of buses, lorries, and electric trams increased. Starting from 1924, the NMVB/SNCV started to operate buses (either owned or hired). At this time, the electric tramway network was already 523 kilometres (325 mi) in length. In 1939, the NMVB/SNCV operated 161 regular bus lines amounting to 279 kilometres (173 mi).

After World War II lorries, buses, and cars deprived the trams of much of their business. The electric network reached a peak of 1,528 kilometres (949 mi) in 1950. The whole network (electric and non-electric) was still approximately 4,236 kilometres (2,632 mi) in length (the peak of 4,811 kilometres (2,989 mi) was in 1945), but by 1960 had been reduced to only 977 kilometres (607 mi). On several rural lines, passenger tramways were replaced by buses but SNCV/NMVB kept running freight trams until it wasn't profitable anymore. In 1977, the buses of the Belgian railways (SNCB/NMBS) were transferred to SNCV/NMVB. The tramways from Brussels to Wemmel, Koningslo and Grimbergen closed in 1978.

Political federalism within Belgium from 1980 onwards saw the splitting of many national institutions into separate bodies for Flanders, Wallonia, and the Brussels-Capital Region. SNCV/NMVB was broken up in 1991 into De Lijn (for Flanders) and TEC (for Wallonia), both companies were now primarily operating buses. De Lijn inherited the tram systems in Ghent and Antwerp (including the Pre-metro), operated previously by local companies MIVG and MIVA respectively, and the coastal tramway. TEC operates the Charleroi light rail system, which includes sections of Vicinal track. STIB/MIVB operates the 1,435 mm (4 ft 8 1/2 in) standard gauge Brussels Metro, tram, and bus network.

== Gallery ==
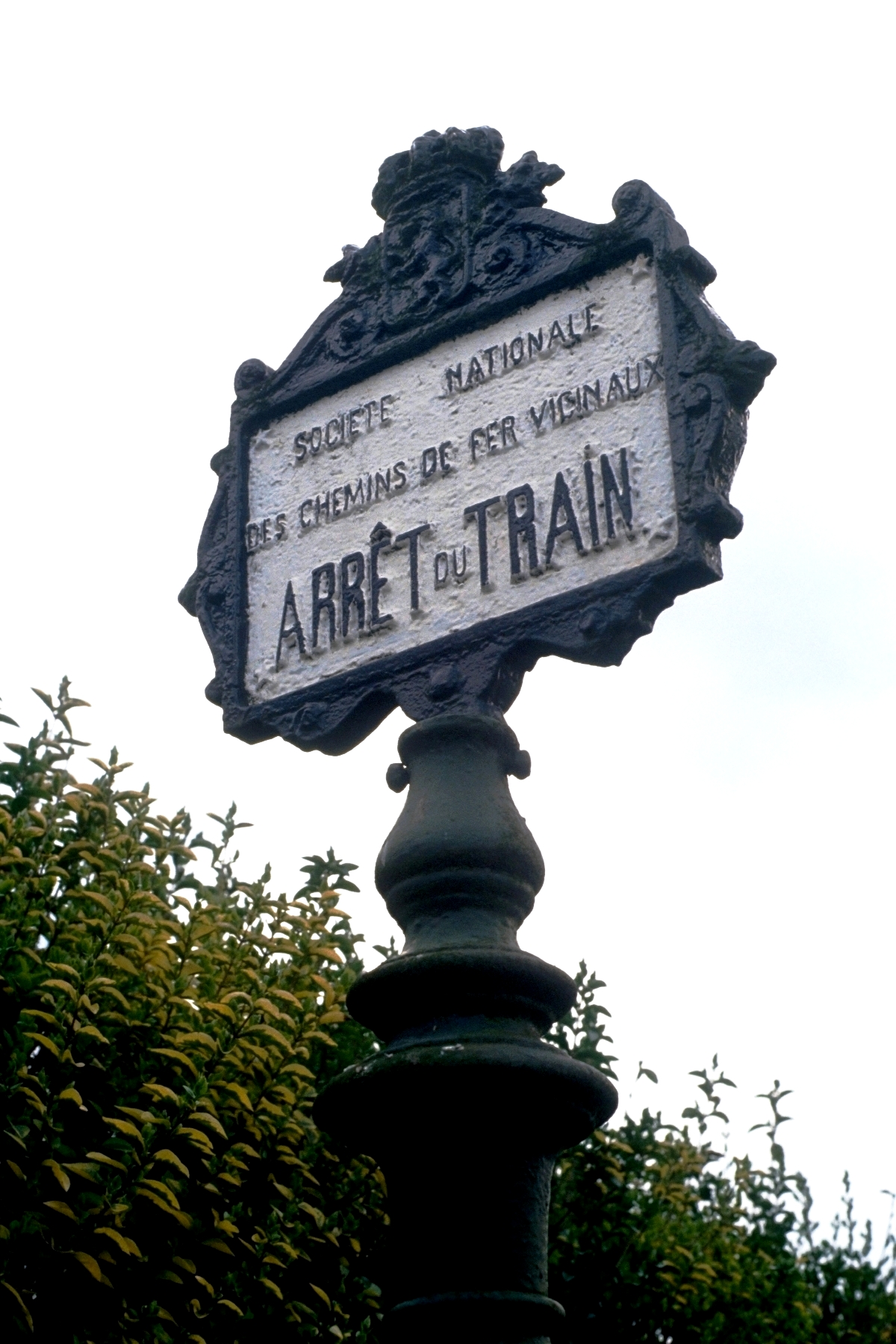
Train signal

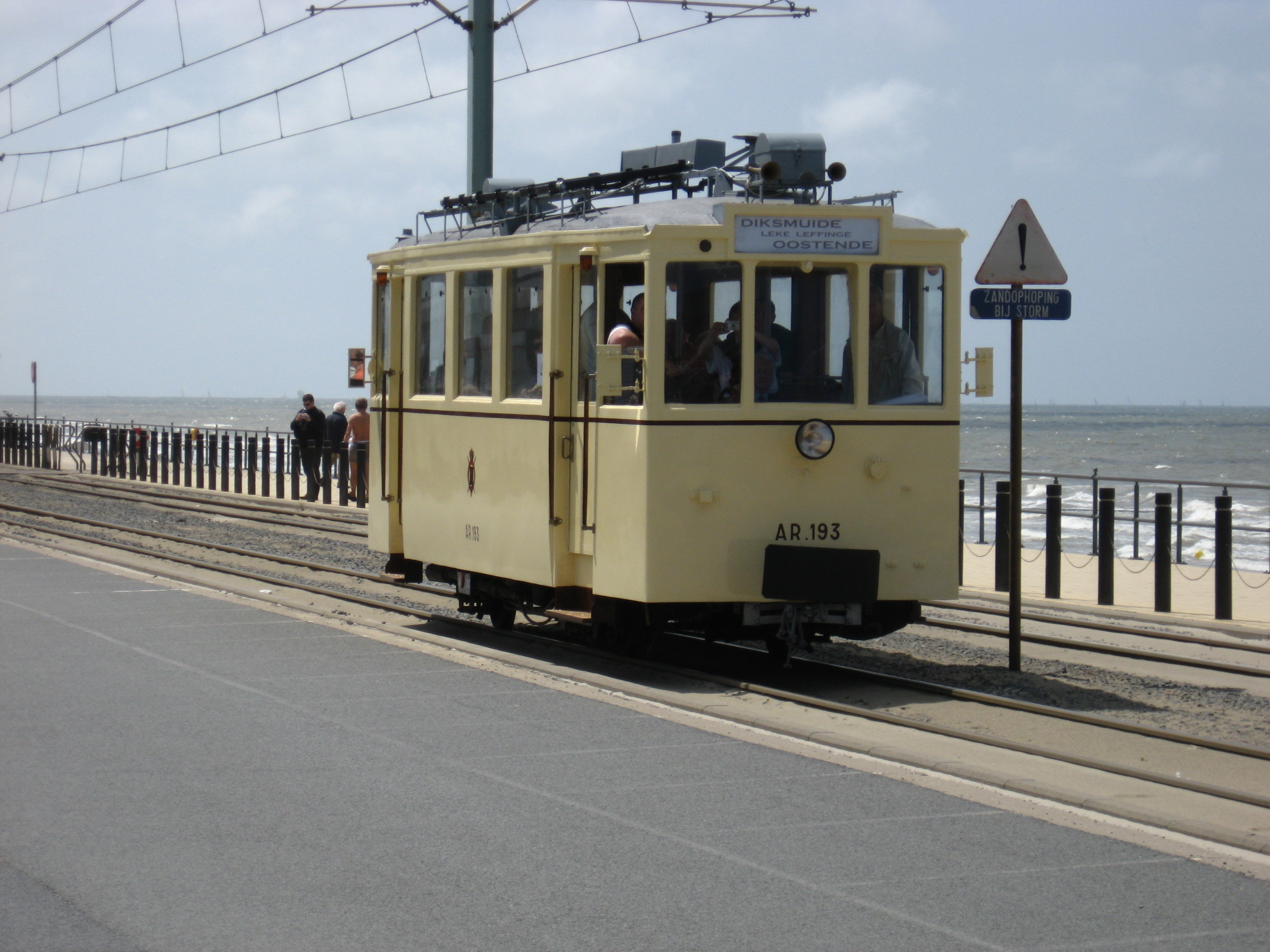
"Tramparade 125 years of vicinal railways", 4th tram of the parade

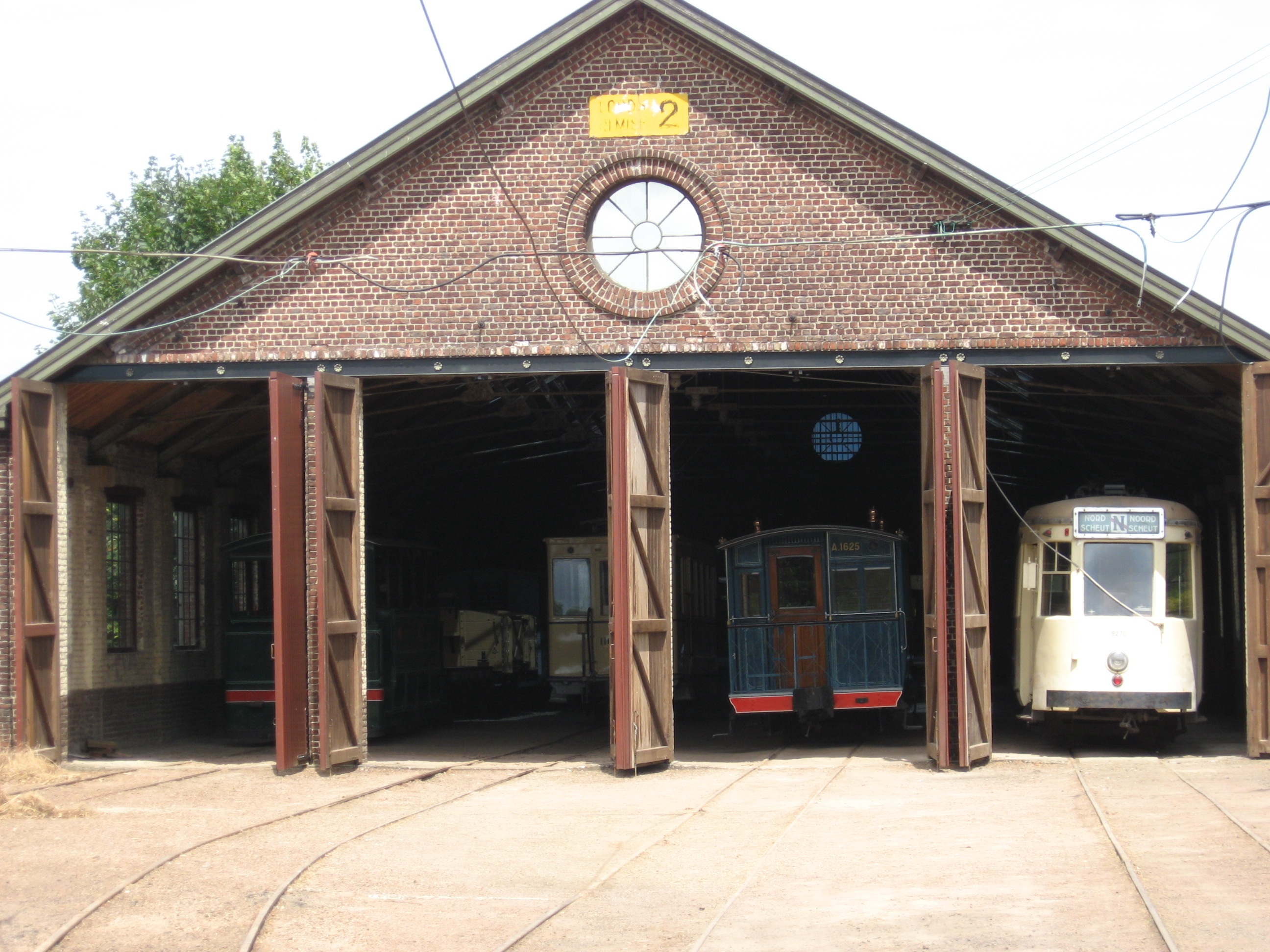
Tramsite Schepdaal

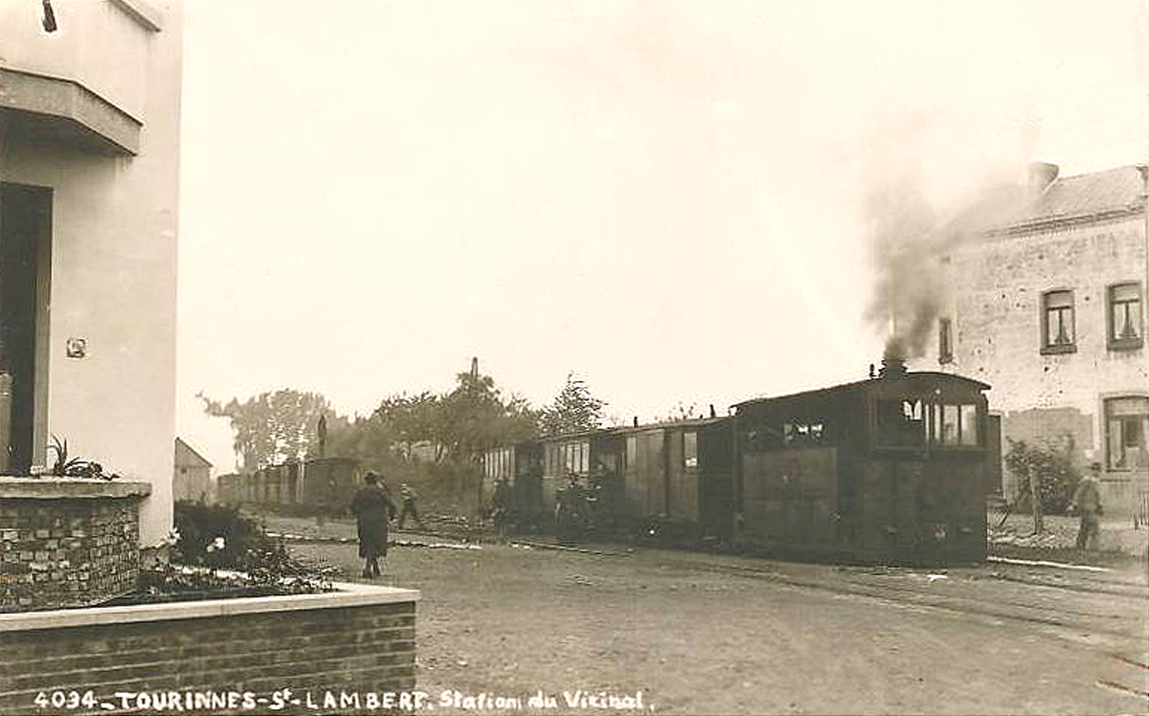
Steam tram in Tourinnes-Saint-Lambert

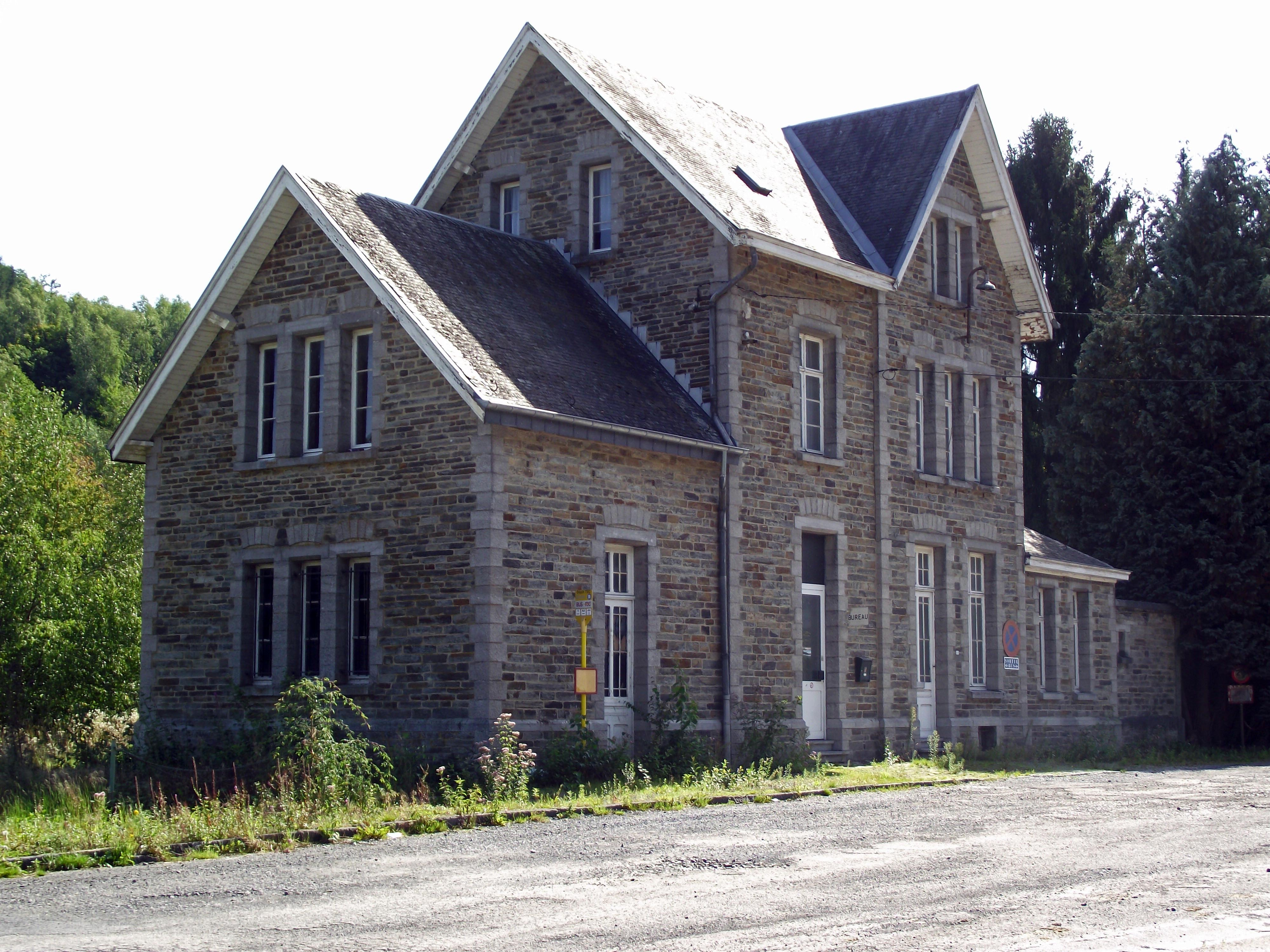
Alle (fr) station building, just outside village, now used as a local office for the Société Régionale Wallonne du Transport

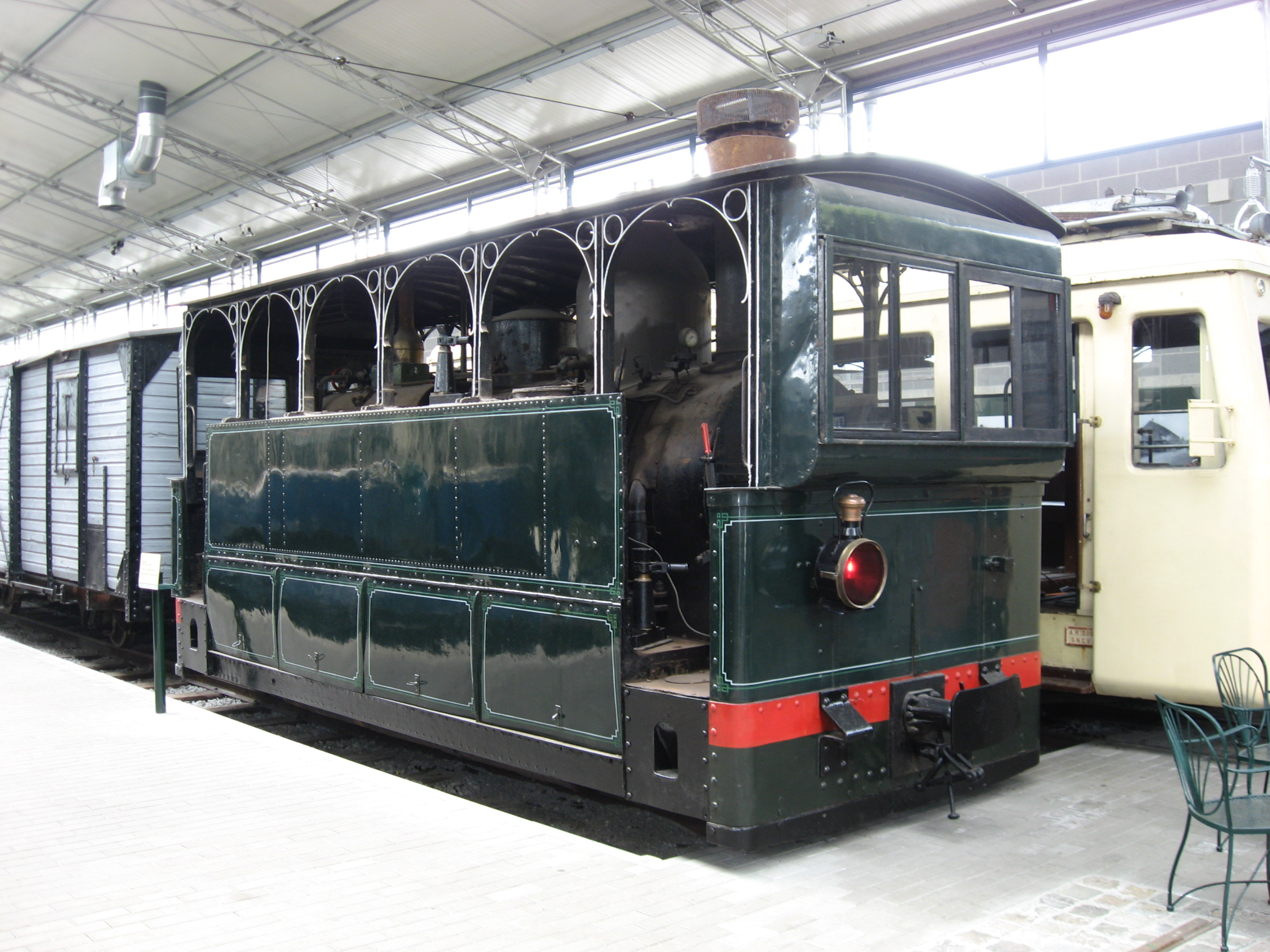
Steam tram locomotive.

== See also ==
- List of town tramway systems in Belgium
