= Raymond Pelgrims de Bigard =

Belgian industrialist (1875-1955)

- Born: 2 April 1875
- Died: 14 May 1955 (aged 80)

Raymond Pelgrims de Bigard (2 April 1875 – 14 May 1955) was a Belgian industrialist, famous for the conservation and restoration of historic castles.

De Bigard became wealthy at the beginning of the 20th century. During the First World War, however, his activities were destroyed. He gained national fame by rescuing multiple important residences with his private fortune, personally owning multiple castles. In 1903 he bought Bijgaarden Castle, former residence of the Lord of Saventhem and Sterrebeke. He restored the castle long before it became a protected monument in 1940.

Besides Groot-Bijgaarden Castle, he saved Beersel Castle.

In 1934 he founded Les Demeures Historiques de Belgique. For his efforts he received royal gratitude.

His son, Eugeen-Willy Pelgrims de Bigard, inherited his castles.

== Village of Groot-Bijgaarden ==
Pelgrims also shaped the present appearance of the village centre of Groot-Bijgaarden. He had the new town hall built, restored the church, built the castle farm and drove the redevelopment of the area around the castle, including a new presbytery. The town hall (the rebuilt "Pampoelhuis") is itself a protected monument.

== Other heritage work ==
Pelgrims is credited in the Flemish heritage inventory with the restoration of Beersel Castle. His son, Eugeen-Willy Pelgrims de Bigard, inherited his castles.
