= Carstian Luyckx =

Flemish painter (1623–1678)

Memento mori

Carstian Luyckx, also known as the Monogrammist KL (1623 – between February 1658 and 1678), was a Flemish painter and draughtsman who specialized in various subgenres of still life painting including flower pieces, fruit still lifes, fish still lifes, pronkstillevens (sumptuous still lifes), vanitas still lifes, hunting pieces and garland paintings. He also painted animals and a few genre scenes. After starting his career in Antwerp he is believed to have worked later in France.

== Life ==
Carstian Luyckx was born in Antwerp in 1623 as the son of David Luycx and Margriet Cloot. He was baptized on 17 August 1623. After being widowed, his mother married Theodoor de Neeff in 1637. She died before 27 October 1639, when Anthoni Raeps, the warden of her two minor children Christian and Maria Luyckx, made up the inventory of her estate. He became an apprentice in the Antwerp Guild of St. Luke in the guild year 1640-1641. He studied painting under Philips de Marlier, a still life specialist, in 1642 and under Frans Francken III, a history painter, in 1645. As an orphan he lived consecutively with his masters.

Game birds and a cat, with a decoy whistle and a wooden snare

He became a master of the Antwerp Guild of St. Luke in the guild year 1644-1645. He married Geertruid Jansens van Kilsdonck on 27 May 1645 in Antwerp. He resided in Lille, France some time during the years 1644 and 1645. After the death of his first wife he married Maria Matthijssens on 24 September 1648 in Antwerp. He is documented in Antwerp until August 1653. It is believed that he left Antwerp and worked in France as many of his later works carry French inscriptions. During his residence in France, Luyckx influenced other vanitas painters, including Simon Renard de St. André.

It is not clear when and where Luyckx died but his death is assumed to have occurred between February 1658 and 1678.

== Work ==
=== General ===
A gentleman hunter with his pack of dogs and hunting trophies

Luyckx was a successful artist who worked in many still life genres and also painted animals and a few genre scenes. He fell into oblivion after his death. Only two dated works are known to exist, making it difficult to establish a chronology for his oeuvre.

Luyckx is known to have collaborated with other Antwerp painters. The Gemäldegalerie Alte Meister in Dresden holds a painting referred to as Kitchen still life with vase of flowers, dead birds, fish and a cat. It is a collaboration of Luyckx with David Teniers the Younger who painted the architectural elements and Nicolaes van Verendael who painted the flowers in a vase. Luyckx painted the game still life, bird cage, dead fish and the cat.

=== Pronkstillevens ===
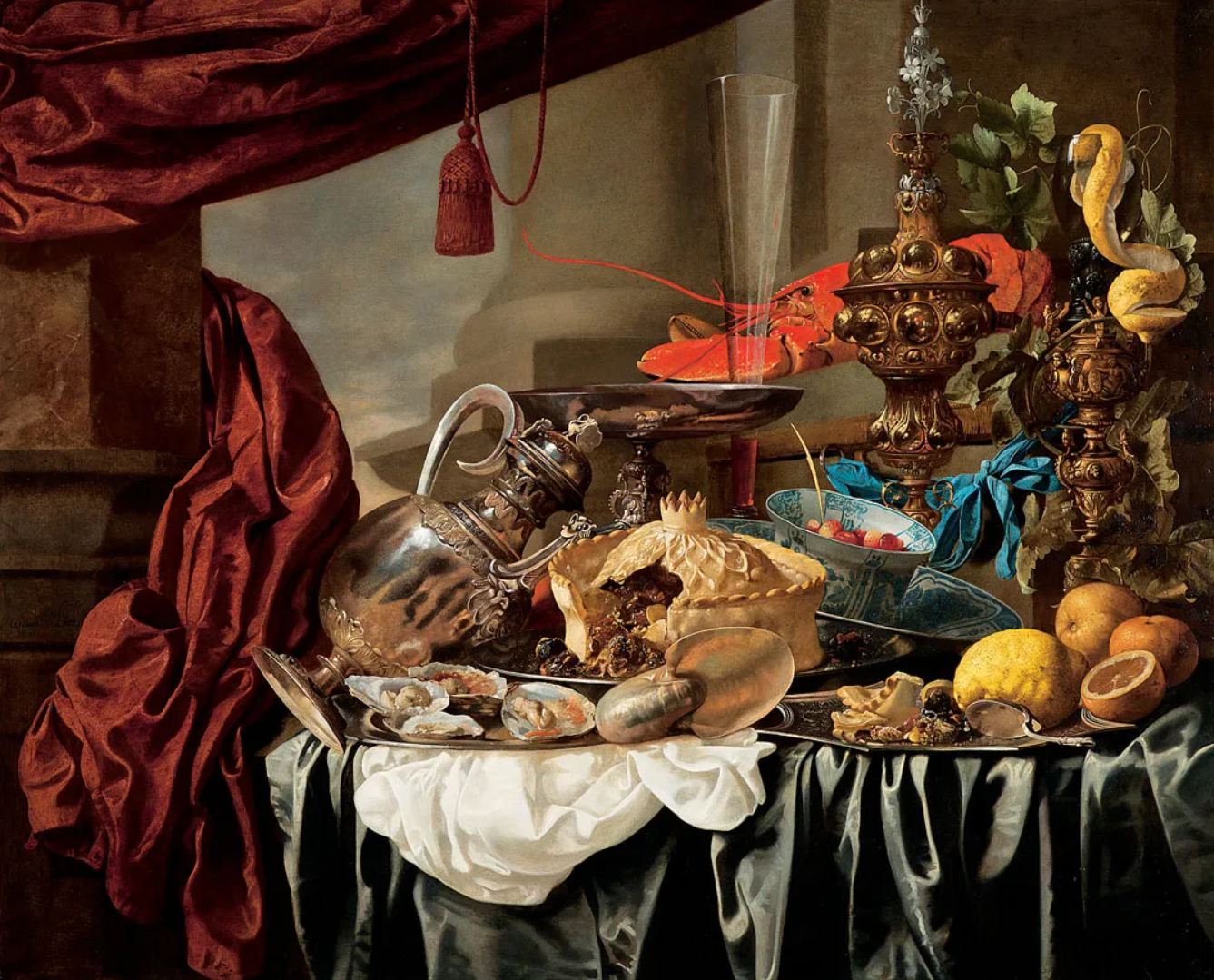
Opulent still life

A large portion of his output consists of pronkstillevens, the sumptuous still lifes that were popular in Flanders and the Dutch Republic from the 1640s. Luyckx’ work in this genre was influenced by the artist Jan Davidsz. de Heem who was active in both Antwerp and the Dutch Republic. A representative example in this genre is the Opulent still life at the Montreal Museum of Fine Arts. This work dates from about 1650 and is painted on copper.

=== Vanitas ===
Vanitas with a celestial globe of Tycho Brahe, seashells, a skull, painting utensils, a book of prints, a coral branch, a latin text and butterflies

Luyckx was especially known for his vanitas still lifes, a genre of still lifes which are intended as a reflection on the meaninglessness of earthly life and the transient nature of all earthly goods and pursuits. He had followers in France such as Simon Renard de St. André and vanitas works by Luyckx have in the past been attributed to these artists. This is for instance the case with the composition Vanitas with a celestial globe of Tycho Brahe, seashells, a skull, painting utensils, a book of prints, a coral branch, a latin text and butterflies (Sold at Turquin Paris Auction of 4 April 2025) This composition contains a number of items, which symbolize the brevity of life and emptiness of earthly achievements such as the skull, butterflies with a short life, the painting utensils and distinctions. The Latin text on a piece of paper refers to life as a soap bubble that ends in death and cites from Horace's Odes (I, 4, lines 13–14): "Pale Death strikes with an equal foot the huts of the poor and the towers of kings." A branch of coral symbolizes the divine protection against the forces of evil that Christians believe Jesus grants them.

=== Hunting pieces and animals ===
Hunting still life of partridges with four Springer spaniels, a hawk, a game-bag and belt and other hunting gear in a landscape

His hunting pieces (game still lifes) were influenced by the Flemish specialists in this genre Frans Snyders and especially Jan Fyt. An example of his hunting pieces is A hunting still life of partridges with four Springer spaniels, a hawk, a game-bag and belt and other hunting gear in a landscape (Sold at Christie's on 20–21 November 2013 in Amsterdam, lot 168). This work is believed to date to the transitional phase between Luyckx’ Antwerp and French periods in the 1650s.

Some fish still lifes by Luyckx are known, some of which were previously attributed to specialists of this genre such as Abraham van Beijeren or followers of Alexander Adriaenssen.

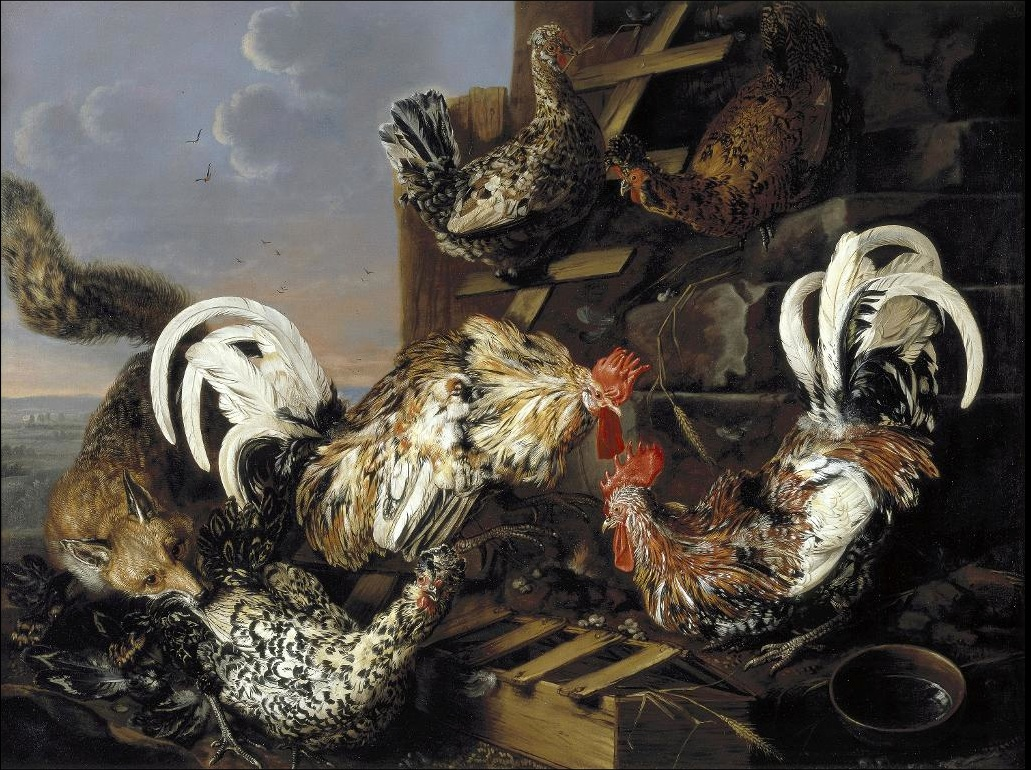
Fowl attacked by a fox

Luyckx painted compositions with life animals. A good example of this is the Fowl Attacked by a Fox (The Kremer Collection). This composition gives a lively rendering of a fox catching a chicken amidst a group of fowl. The artist has aptly observed the startled reaction of the rooster nearest to the fox. The other fowl appear unaware of the danger that they are in. The chicken that is being grabbed stares at the viewer more in surprise than in fear.

=== Flower and garland paintings ===
Carstian Luyckx painted flower paintings as well as garland paintings, a special type of still life developed in Antwerp at the beginning of the 17th century by Jan Brueghel the Elder in collaboration with the Italian cardinal Federico Borromeo.

Swag of roses and thistle-leaf on a sculpted table and a red admiral and a cabbage butterfly in a landscape

Other artists involved in the early development of the genre included Hendrick van Balen, Andries Daniels, Peter Paul Rubens and Daniel Seghers. The genre was initially connected to the visual imagery of the Counter-Reformation movement. It was further inspired by the cult of veneration and devotion to Mary prevalent at the Habsburg court (then the rulers over the Southern Netherlands) and in Antwerp generally). Garland paintings typically show a flower garland around a devotional image, portrait or other religious symbol (such as the host). Garland paintings were typically collaborations between a still life specialist and a figure painter.

Cartouche with Flowers

Luyckx painted a number of garland paintings. In a few of these the cartouche was painted later by an unknown hand. An example is the Cartouche with Flowers (Princeton University Art Museum), which shows a flower garland around a portrait of Peter Paul Rubens painted at a later date by an unknown artist. This may be an indication that the painting had remained unsold during his lifetime. Luyckx rendered the flowers with such specificity that they can be identified easily. They are a combination of familiar Western European garden plants such as carnations and columbines as well as exotic varieties from the Orient, including the pink damask rose and the tulip. Luyckx included the rare parrot tulip, an extremely expensive variety at that time.
