= Beersel Hills Observatory =

Belgian astronomy facility

- Observatory code: 200
- Location: Beersel, Belgium
- Coordinates: 50°45′37″N 4°18′13″E
- Website: users.skynet.be/bho/
- Location of Beersel Hills Observatory

Beersel Hills Observatory is a private amateur astronomical observatory. Founded in April 1998, it is located near Beersel, Belgium. It is owned by Paul Van Cauteren and Patricia Lampens. It is primarily dedicated to the study of variable stars and visual double stars, including Delta Scuti, eclipsing binaries, and visual double stars.

== See also ==
- List of astronomical observatories
