= Groot-Bijgaarden Castle =

Castle in Groot-Bijgaarden, Belgium

- Kasteel van Groot-Bijgaarden (Dutch); Château de Grand-Bigard (French)
- Groot-Bijgaarden, Flemish Brabant
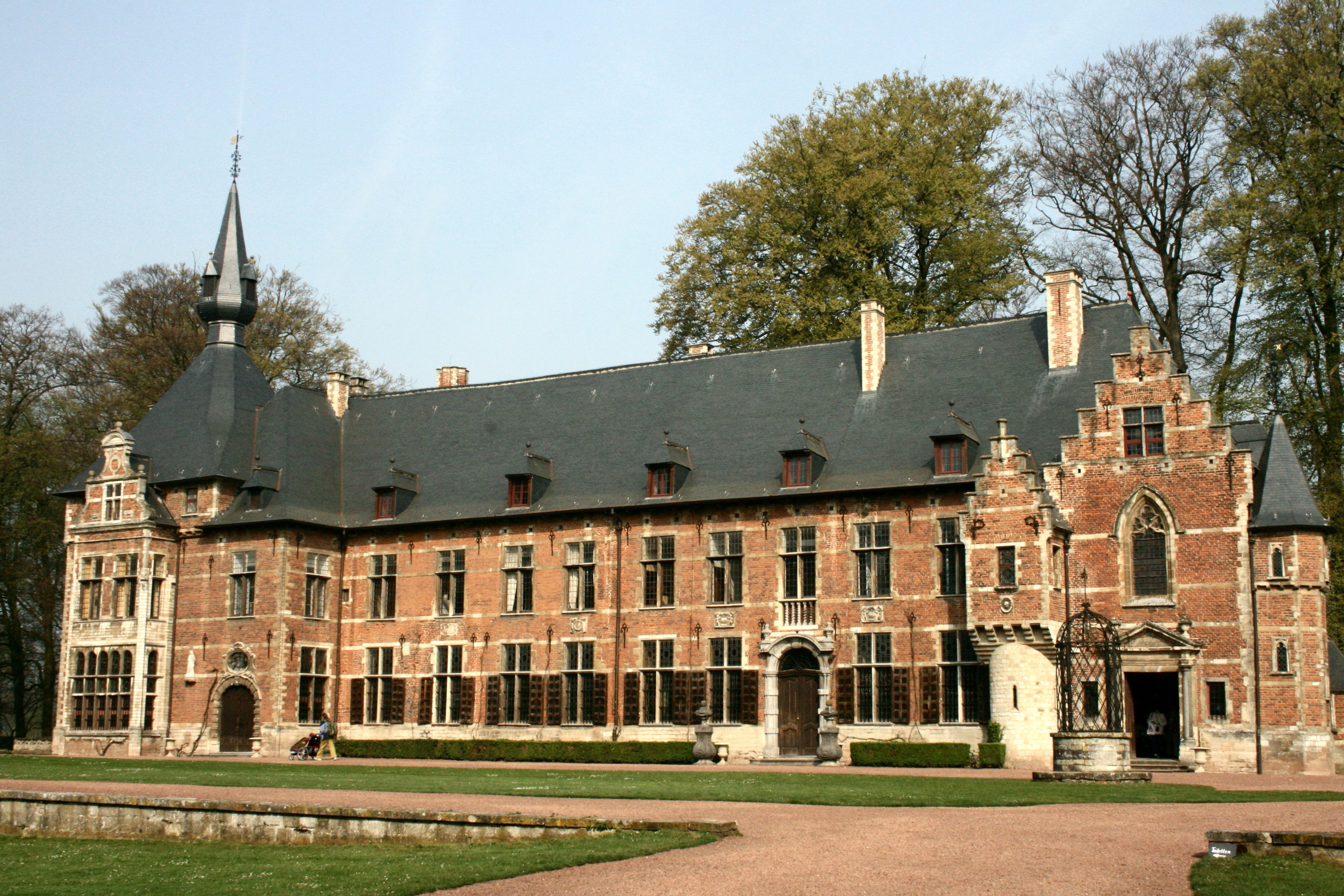
- Groot-Bijgaarden Castle

Site information
- Type: Castle
- Owner: House Pelgrims de Bigard
- Condition: Restored

Location
- Coordinates: 50.873°N 4.264°E

Site history
- Built: Original castle: 12th century Modern castle: 17th century Restored: 1902–1930s
- Materials: Brick

Groot-Bijgaarden Castle (Dutch: Kasteel van Groot-Bijgaarden; French: Château de Grand-Bigard) is a 12th-century castle in Groot-Bijgaarden in the municipality of Dilbeek, Flemish Brabant, Belgium. The castle was built for Almaric de Bigard, the first lord of Bigard. Groot-Bijgaarden Castle is situated at an elevation of 47 metres (154 ft).

== History ==
The castle was built by the lords of Bijgaarden. The first whose name is known, an Amelricus (or Almaric) de Bigard who appears in 1110, obtained the domain from St. Bavo's Abbey. A successor, Arnulfus III, probably ordered the construction of the first castle in the early 12th century, a motte castle designed to protect the southern lands (in Kobbegem they owned a second domain and castle).

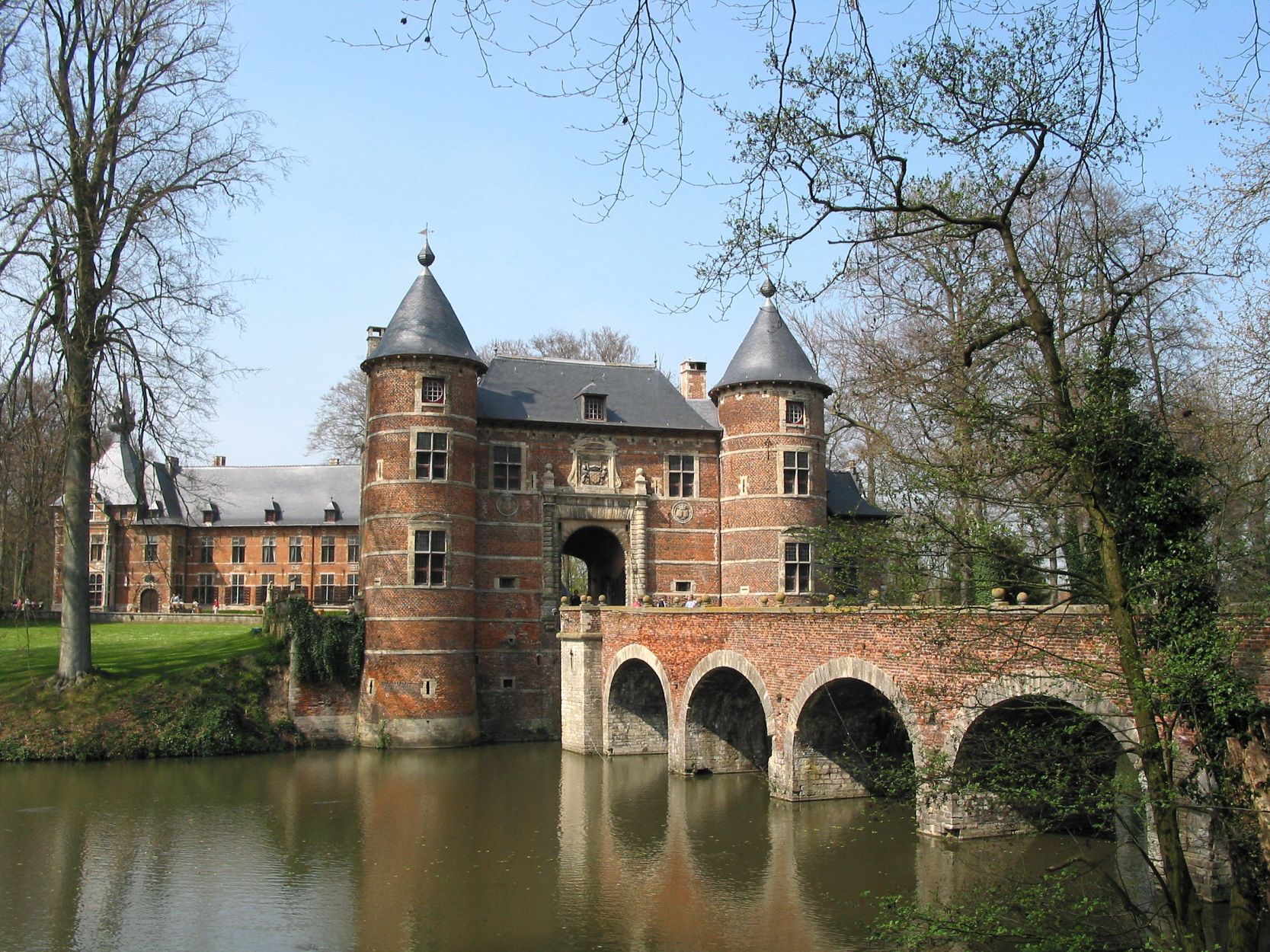
Groot-Bijgaarden Castle's bridge and gatehouse

In the early 14th century, the family died out with a double-cross marriage: Floris and Katharina van Bijgaarden married Katharina and Willem II Veele, called Rongman. With their children dividing the possessions in 1347, the lordship came into the hands of a new house. A descendant, Willem IV Rongman, lord of Bijgaard, was alderman of Brussels (1418) and was made captain of the city by Philip the Good to put down the crafts rebellion of 1421–22. He took the oath in April 1422 and was granted the Hôtel Ostrevant on the Place de la Monnaie/Muntplein. On 21 December 1423, Willem was relieved of his duties by John IV, Duke of Brabant, and a few days later, he had to return the keys of the city gates, his deed of appointment, and the grant deed of the Hôtel Ostrevant to the city magistrate.

In 1486, Willem (or Guillaume) Estor acquired the castle and the Bijgaard lordship. He came from an old Brussels family (alderman in 1475) and bore the Berthout coat of arms. His grandson Jan (or Jean) Estor and his mother Margriete van Baenst flirted with Protestantism under the influence of their confidant Antonio de Laymant. After coming into the sights of the authorities in the spring of 1546, the situation escalated on Christmas Day due to improper behaviour in the parish church. Bailiff Guillaume le Tourneur came to besiege mother and son with 30 soldiers in their castle. After 36 hours, the keep was on fire and both surrendered. A long trial followed in which their defence was of no avail: they were beheaded in January 1548 in the courtyard of Vilvoorde Castle and their goods were confiscated. Gaspard II Schetz, the powerful financier and lord of Grobbendonk, bought Groot-Bijgaarden on 14 February 1549 for 17,800 pounds and sold it six years later to Laurens (or Laurent) Longin of Lembeek.

Count Ferdinand van Booischot bought the castle in 1634, and in fifteen years, transformed it to its present appearance. Among other things, he had the chapel added in 1640. In the 18th century, the castle fell to his great-granddaughter Helena (or Hélène) van Booischot. She married Karel (or Charles) Ferdinand, Count of Königsegg-Rothenfels and regent-interim of the Netherlands. On the occasion of this marriage, Empress Maria Theresa elevated the lordship of Groot-Bijgaarden to a marquisate under the name Booischot. After Charles Ferdinand, the property was gradually split up.

In 1902, the castle was very dilapidated and Raymond Pelgrims de Bigard began renovations that lasted 30 years.

== Architecture ==
The castle is in the Flemish Renaissance style, with red bricks, white stone windows and a blue slate roof. It is surrounded by a wide moat spanned by a five-arched bridge, headed by two 17th-century heraldic lion sculptures, leading to the drawbridge. The central part of the gatehouse dates from the 14th century. A four-storey tower (the "dungeon", built 1347), 30 metres (98 ft) high, stands to the left of this gatehouse.

== Parks and gardens ==
Garden architect Louis Fuchs created the 14-hectare park alongside the castle at the start of the 20th century. Every year since 2003, the park is open to an international flower exhibition with tulips as its central theme.

The floral shows in the grounds of Groot-Bijgaarden Castle are dedicated to tulips, with over 300 varieties (early, medium and late varieties, as well as classic triumphs, botanicals, fleurs-de-lis, viridiflora, parrots and multi-flora) and other varieties of spring bulb flowers. More than a million bulbs are planted. The new varieties, developed under a number, are waiting to be given a name, and these creations are exclusive.

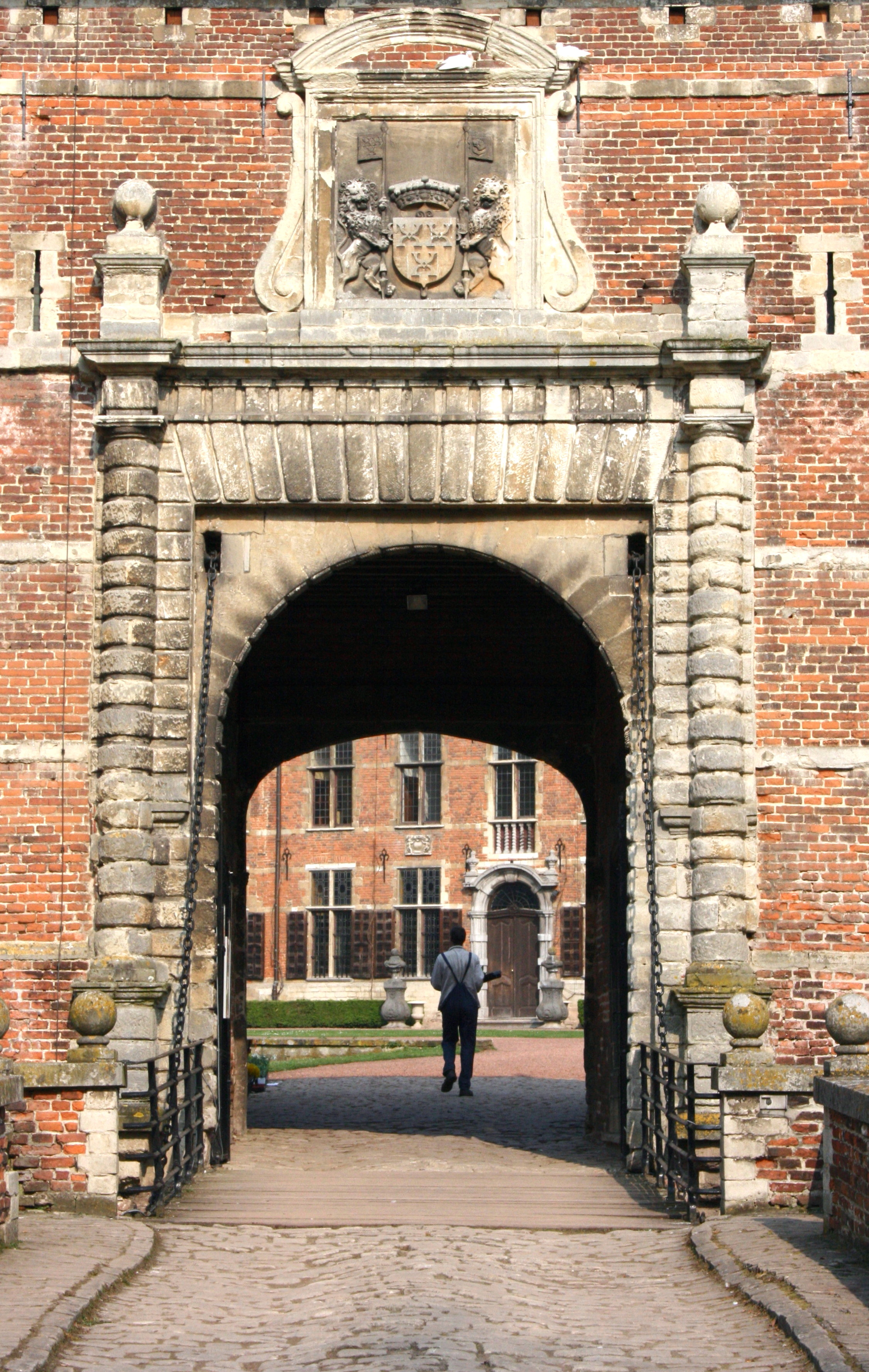
Gate

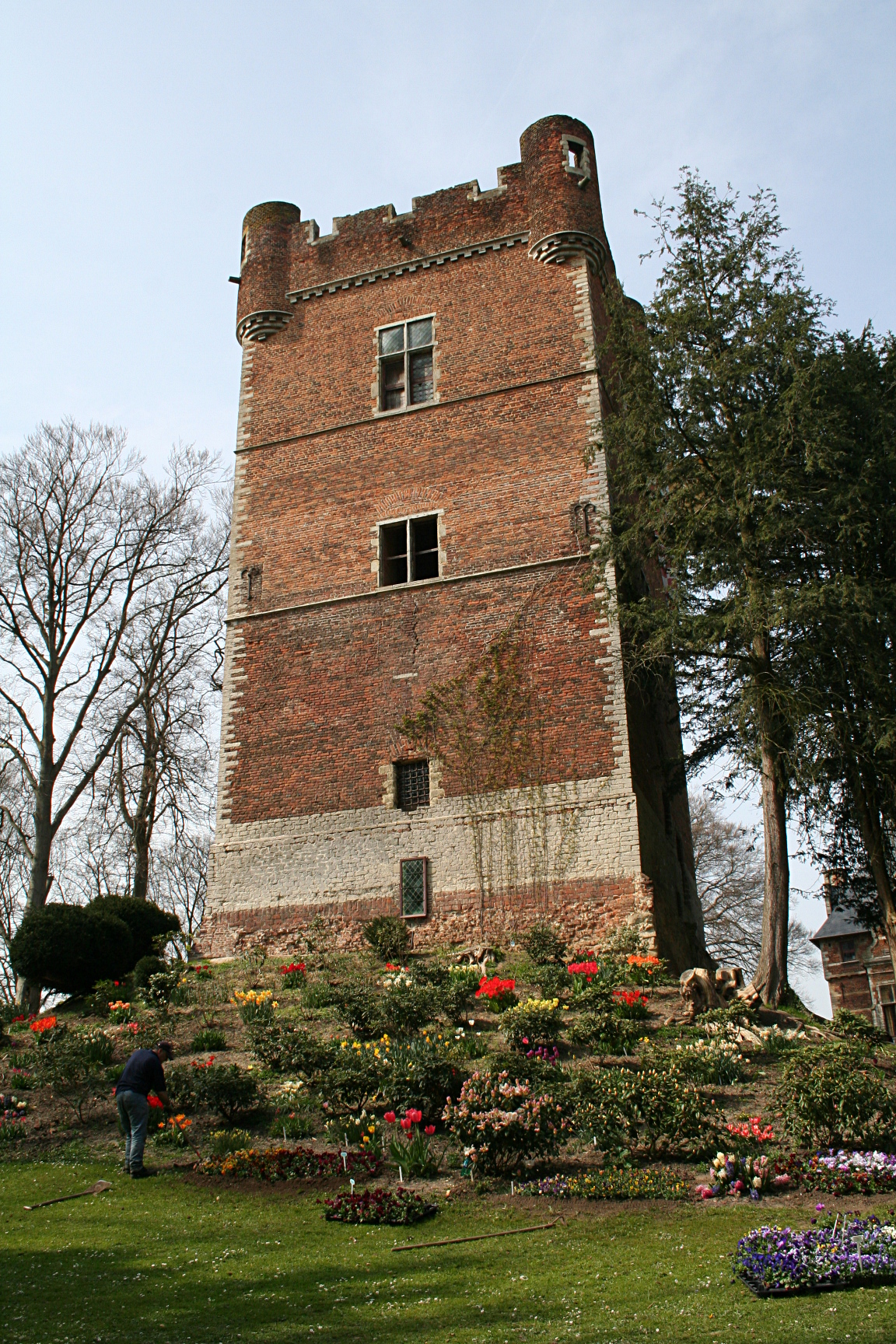
Dungeon

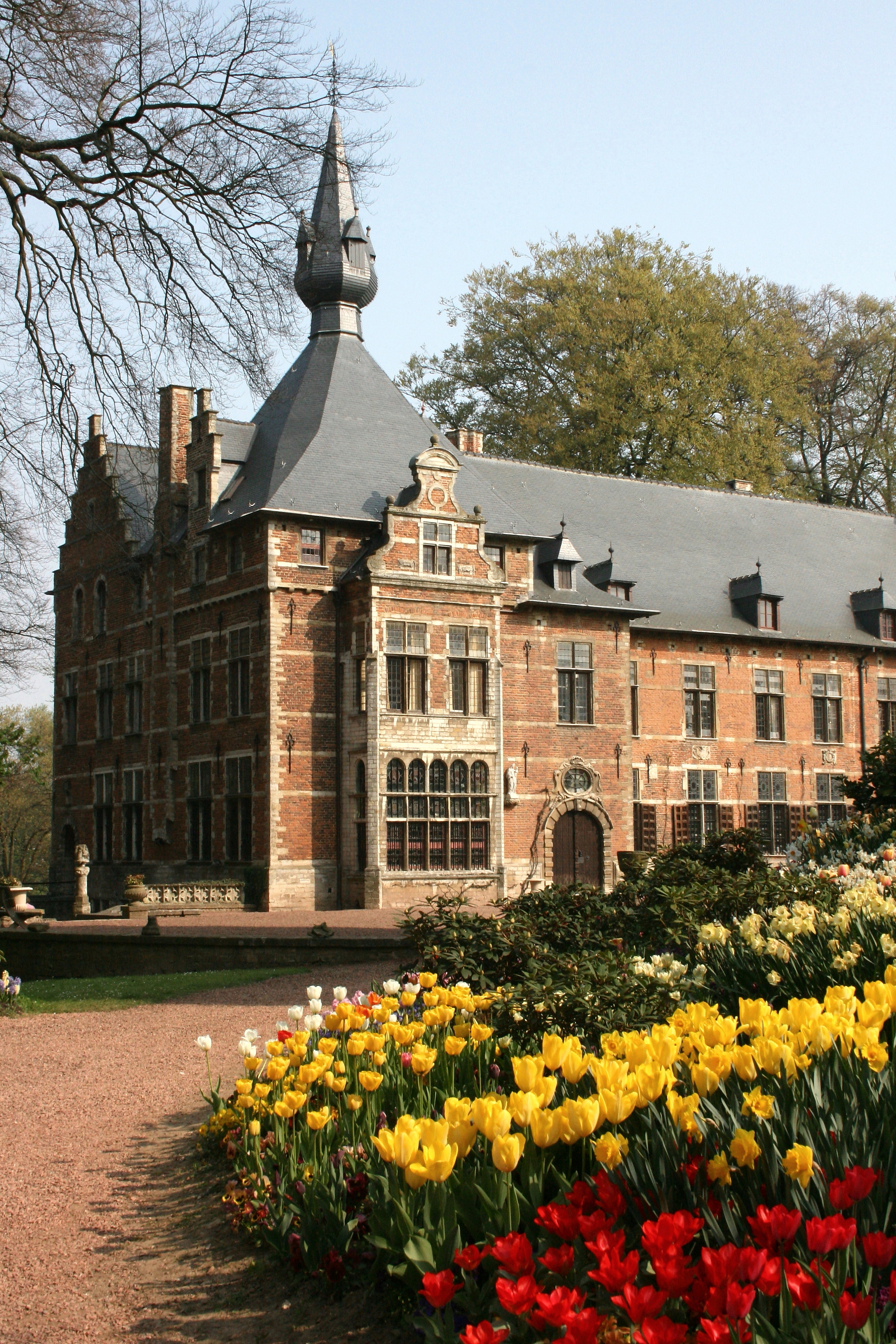
West wing

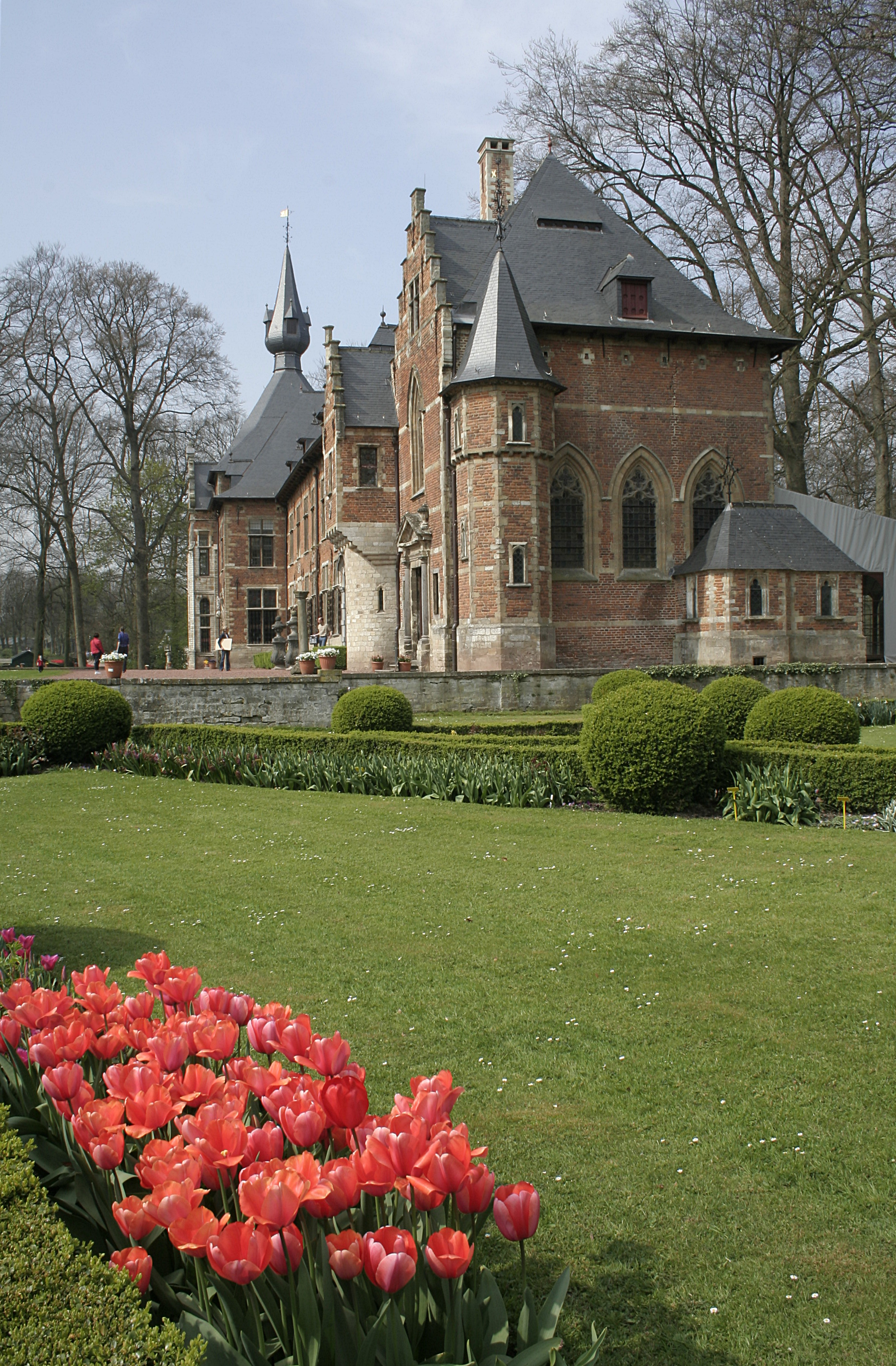
East wing

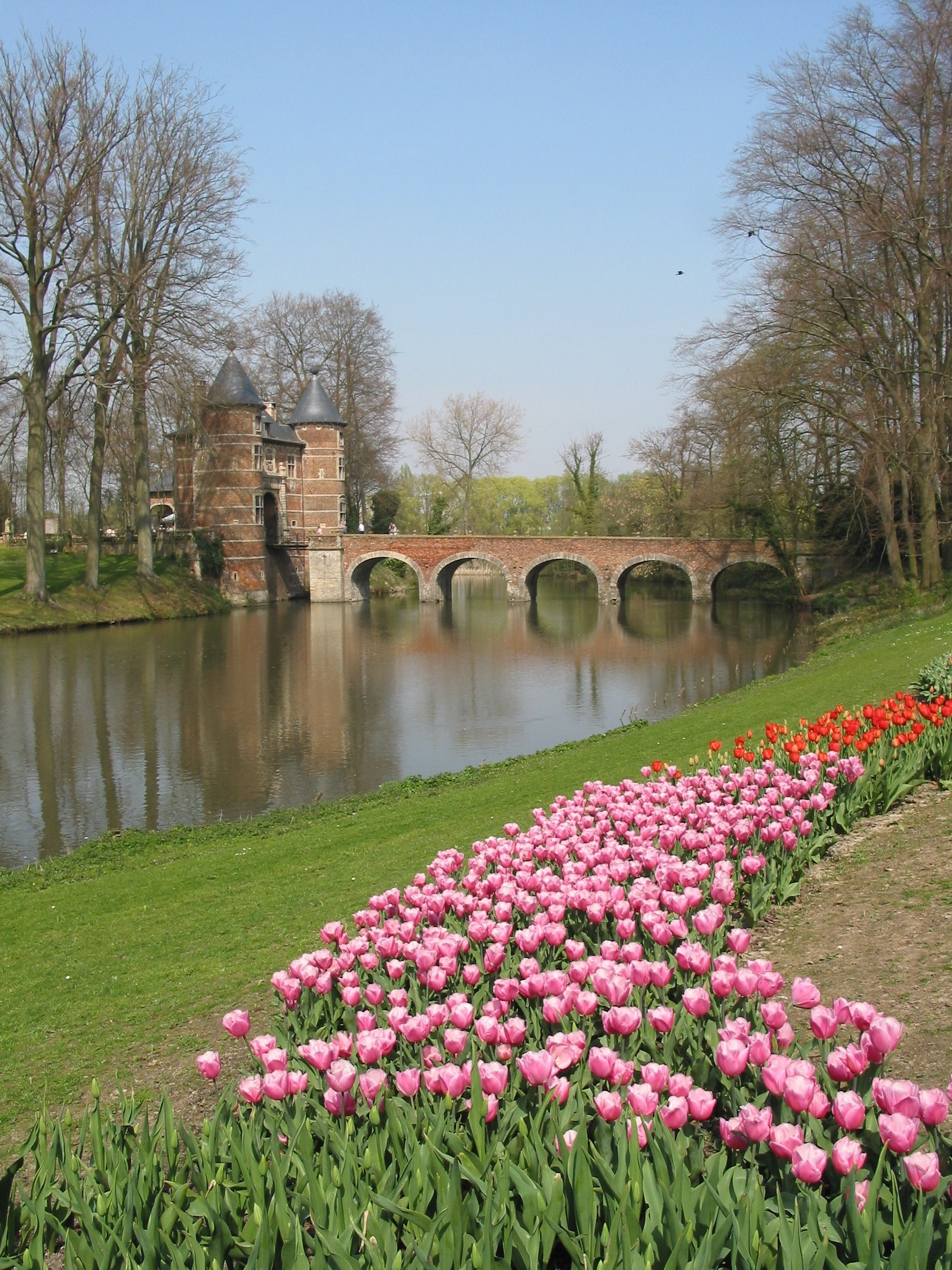
Moat

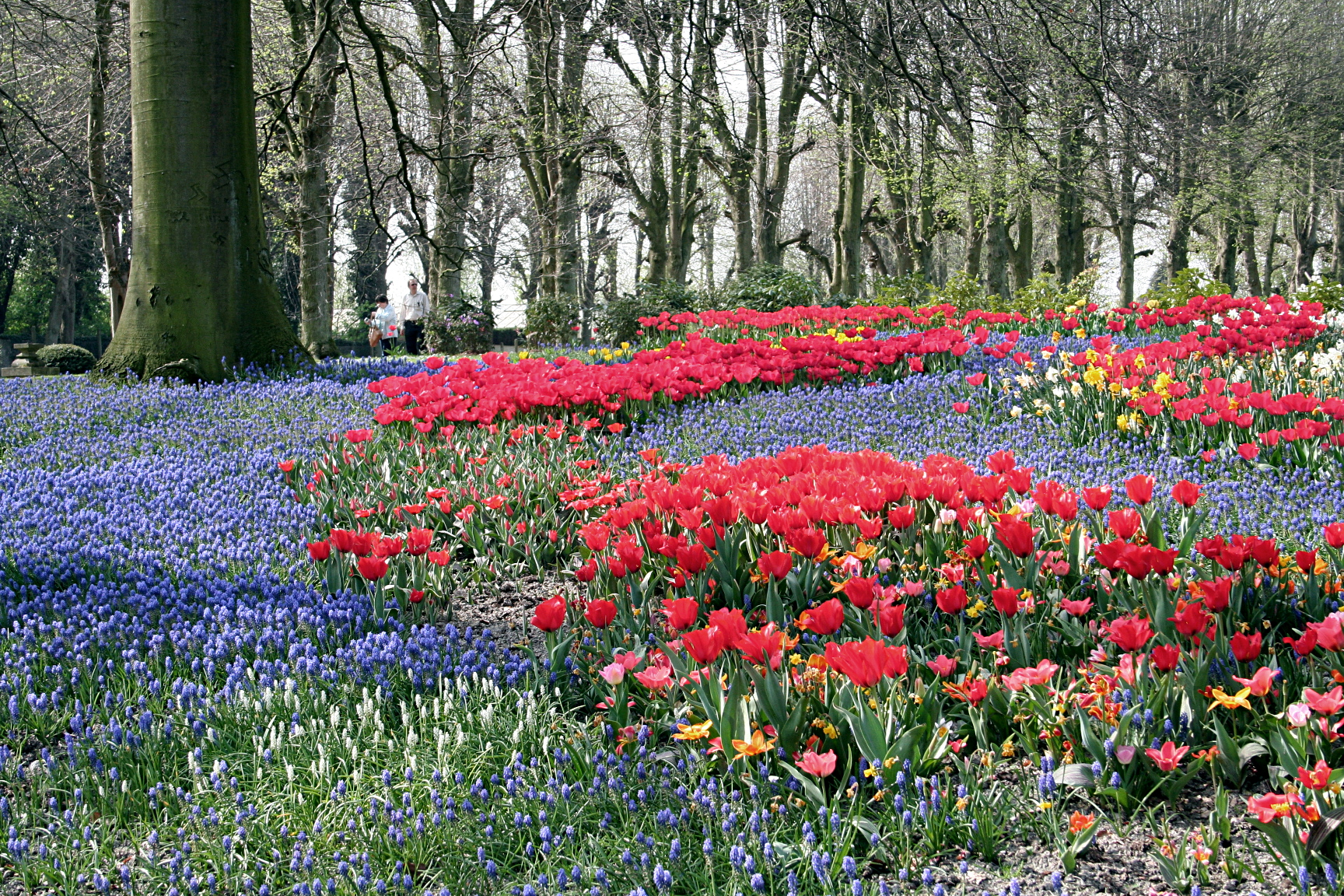
Park

== See also ==
- List of castles and châteaux in Belgium
- Beersel Castle
- Gaasbeek Castle
