= Wivina (abbess) =

French Roman Catholic saint

Saint Wivina
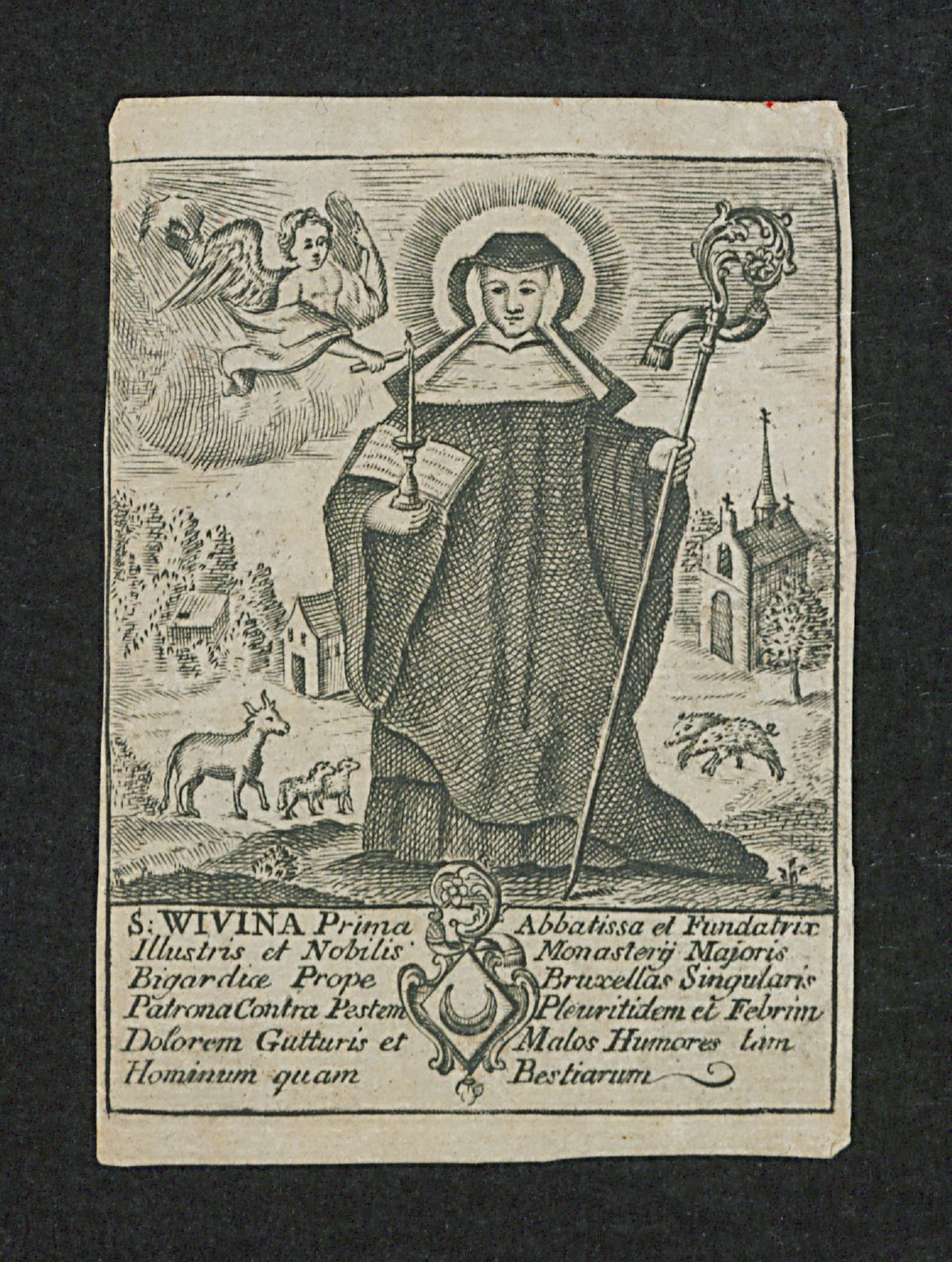
- A prayer card depicting St Wivina (Thijs Collection, University of Antwerp)
- Born: 1103; Oisy, France
- Died: 1168; Groot-Bijgaarden, near Brussels, Belgium
- Venerated in: Roman Catholic Church
- Feast: 17 December

Wivina (1103–1168) was a Benedictine abbess. Born in Oisy, France, she refused all offers of marriage, becoming, aged 23, a hermit at Groot-Bijgaarden, near Brussels. She later accepted land from Count Godfrey of Brabant on which she built a monastery, serving as its first abbess.
