= Groot-Bijgaarden =

Village and deelgemeente in Flanders, Belgium

Coordinates: 50°52′N 4°15′E

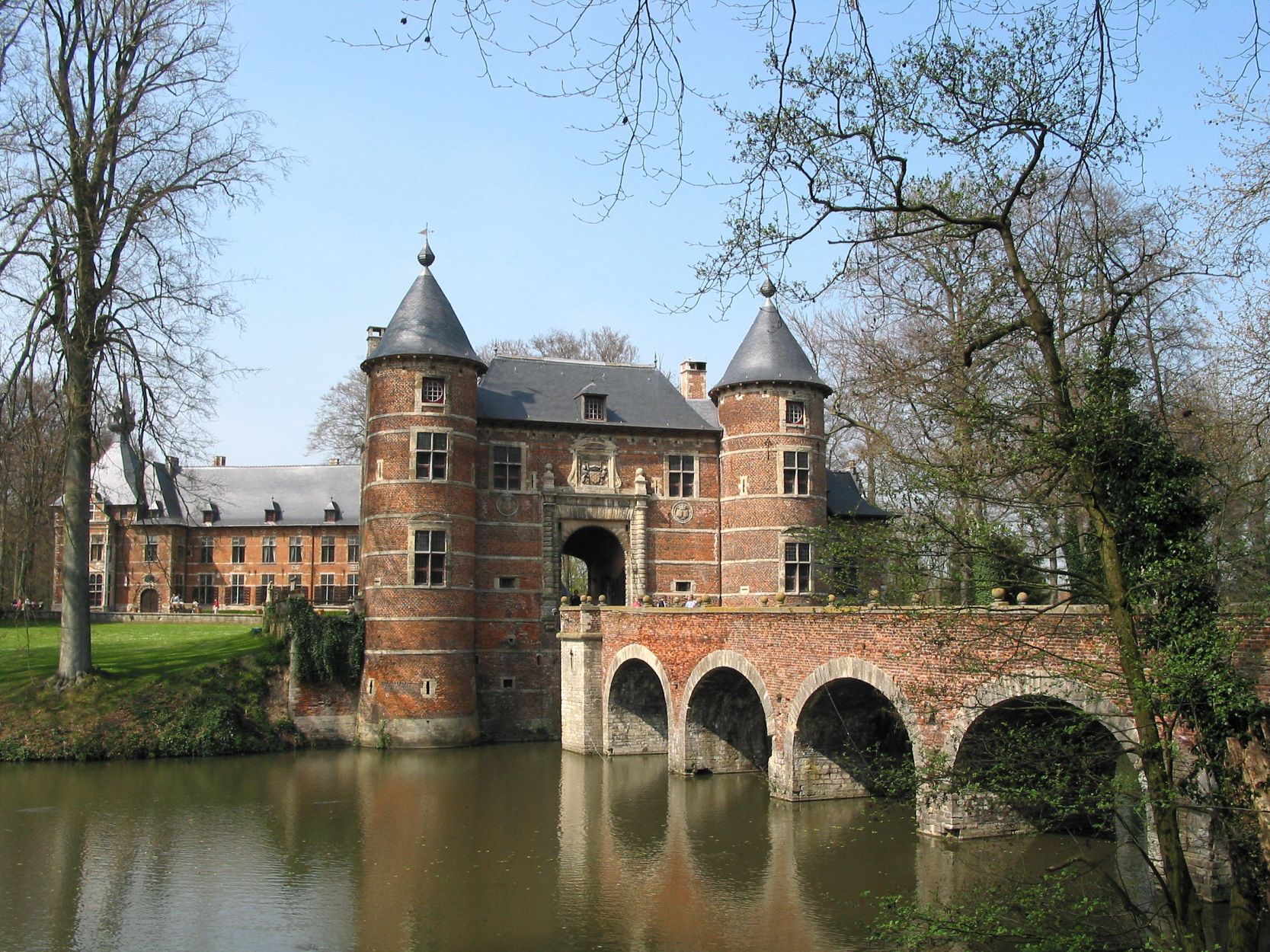
Groot-Bijgaarden Castle

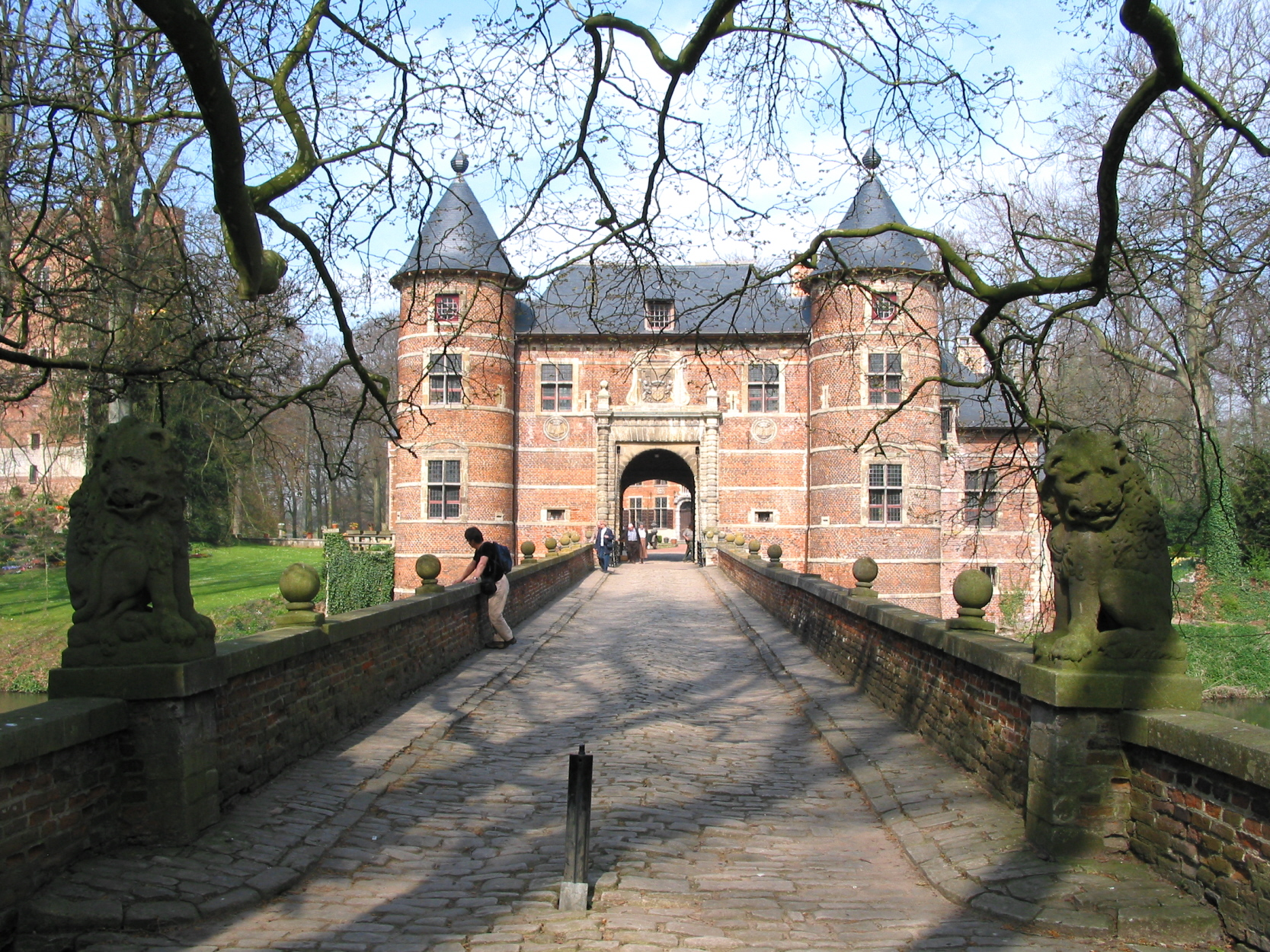
Groot-Bijgaarden Castle's bridge and gatehouse

Groot-Bijgaarden (French: Grand-Bigard) is a village and deelgemeente in the municipality of Dilbeek, a suburb of Brussels, in Flanders, Belgium.

== Toponymy ==
The name Bijgaarden is derived from the Germanic word for enclosure. The appellation "Great" (Groot) was attached to distinguish it from the smaller Klein-Bijgaarden nearby, now in the municipality of Sint-Pieters-Leeuw.

== History ==
The earliest record of Groot-Bijgaarden is in the 12th century, when it appears as Bigardis. This derives from the house of Bijgaarden. They made various contributions to the abbeys of Affligem and Groot-Bijgaarden. As a result of different marriages, the village came into the hands of the Veele Family, an important family from Brussels.

After many donations, Groot-Bijgaarden was publicly sold to the counts of Königsegg-Erps in the second half of the 14th century.

It is a former municipality in the province of Flemish Brabant, Belgium. Since 1977 it is a subdivision (deelgemeente) of the municipality of Dilbeek.

== Geography ==
Groot-Bijgaarden is situated between Dilbeek and Zellik. As of 31 December 2019 the population of Groot-Bijgaarden was 8.349.

== Attractions ==
- Groot-Bijgaarden Castle: rebuilt castle, where an annual flower show is held in spring.
- Saint-Wivina Benedictine nunnery: founded in 1125, grew strongly thanks to various donations, sold publicly during the French Revolution.
- Sint-Egidius Church: built in 1776, rebuilt in 1950 after a hit by a German V2 during the Second World War

== Gallery ==
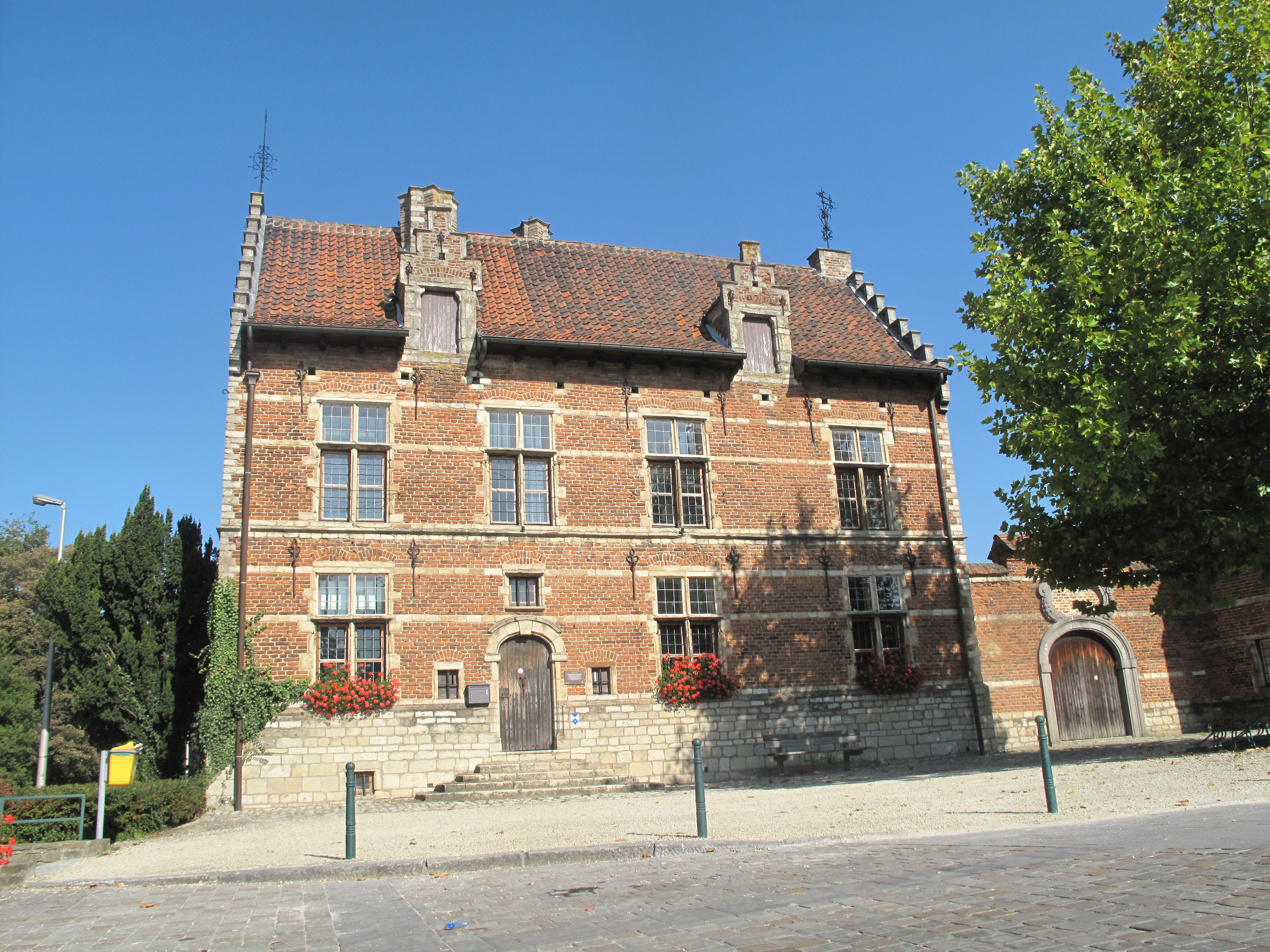
Groot Bijgaarden, monumental house: het Pampoelhuis

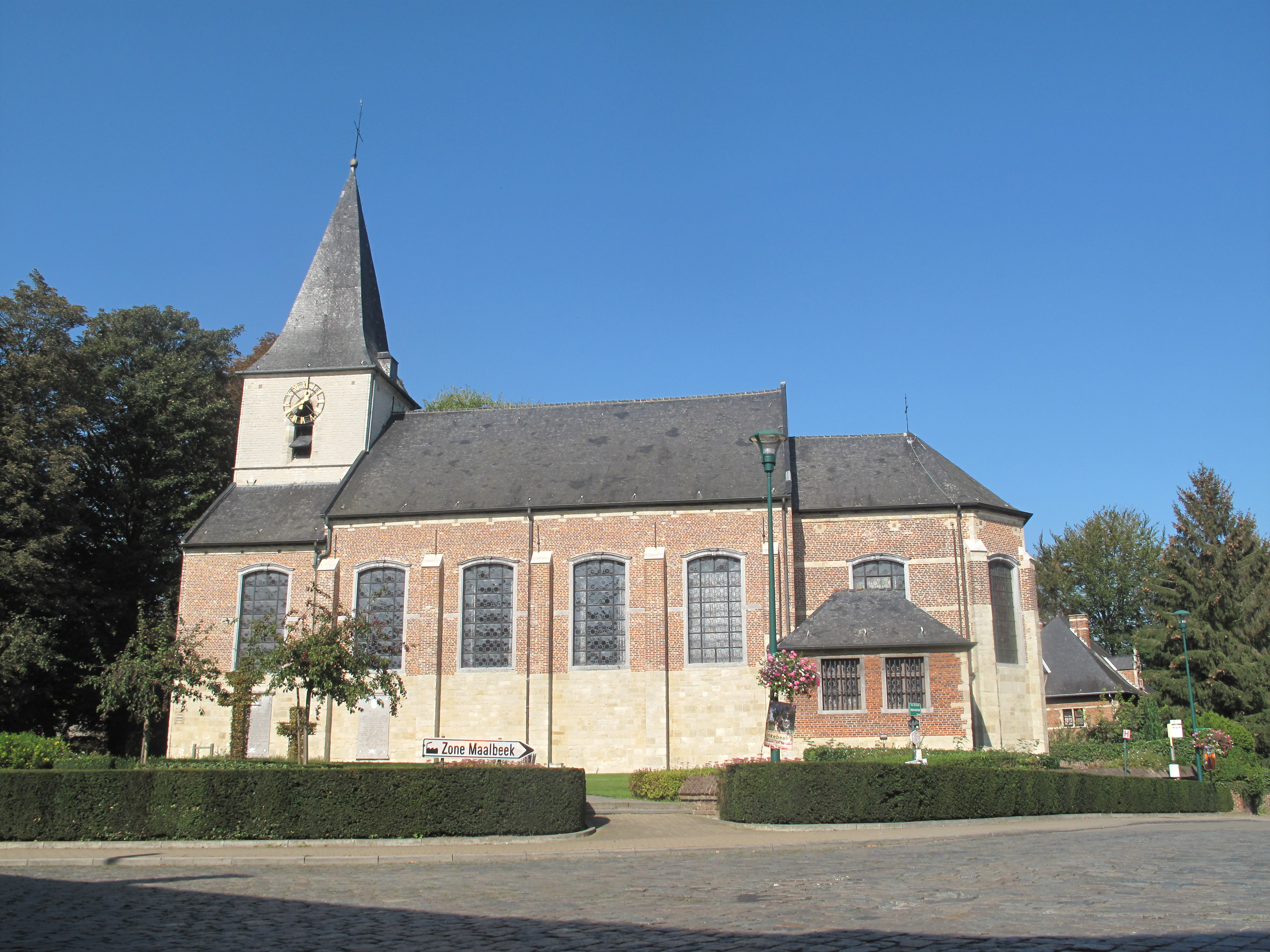
Groot Bijgaarden, church
