= Philips de Marlier =

Flemish painter (c. 1600–1668)

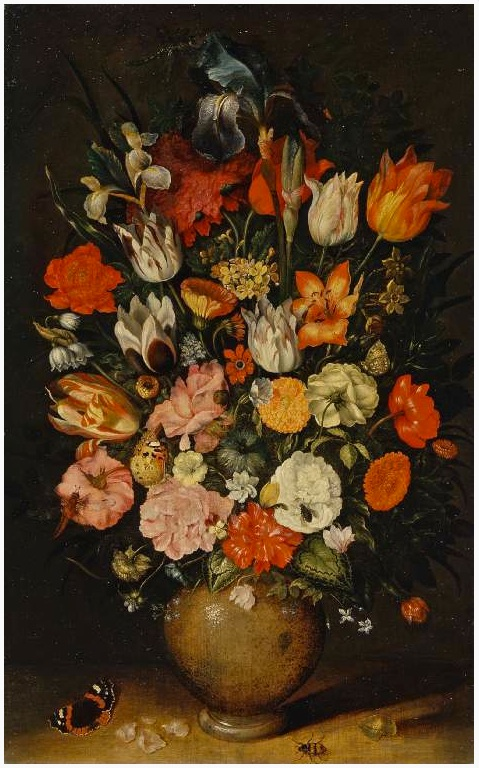
A Vase of Flowers

Philips de Marlier (Note: Many variant name spellings: Philippe de Marlier, Filip de Marlier, Philip de Marlier, Flips de Marlin, Philips de Marli, Philips de Merlyn) (nickname Dicke Lup) (c. 1600 – 1668) was a Flemish Baroque painter and copyist mainly known for his still lifes of flowers and garland paintings.

== Life ==
He was probably born in Antwerp between 1595 and 1605. He was registered in the Antwerp Guild of Saint Luke as an apprentice in 1617–18. He was a pupil of Carel van Ferrara. He became a master in the Guild in the year 1621–1622.

He worked for several years in Portugal. Legend has it that in Portugal he stabbed a Dominican priest to death. This event forced him to flee the country and return to Antwerp. Here he established a workshop where he trained several pupils, including Carstian Luyckx, Gabriël van Baesrode and Frans van Oorschot. He was also active as an art dealer and produced several copies of the work of other Antwerp artists such as Frans Francken the Younger.

He died in Antwerp in 1667 or 1668.

== Work ==
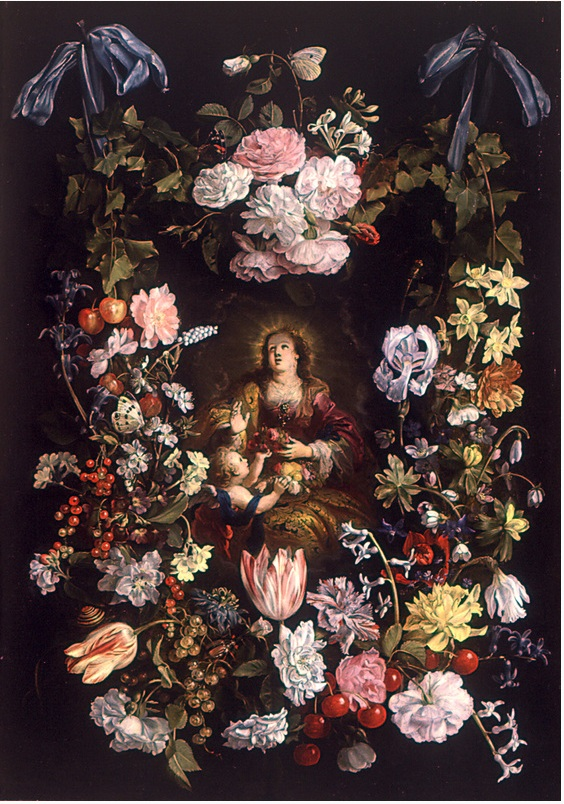
St Dorothea of Caesarea in a Flower Garland

Only a few signed works of him exist and on the basis of these works some more works are attributed to him. He was a still life painter, in particular of flower pieces often including insects. As in the work of other Antwerp painters of his generation such as Jan Brueghel the Younger, some of his flower paintings were dedicated to the presentation of a single variety of flowers.

He also created garland paintings. Garland paintings are a special type of still life developed in Antwerp by artists such as Jan Brueghel the Elder, Hendrick van Balen, Frans Francken the Younger, Peter Paul Rubens and Daniel Seghers. They typically show a flower garland around a devotional image or portrait. Garland paintings were usually collaborations between a still life and a figure painter. De Marlier and his studio often produced garland paintings in collaboration with other painters, such as Frans Francken the Younger, who painted the figures while de Marlier painted the garland.

His oeuvre includes an early signed breakfast style still life (now in Abdij van 't Park, Heverlee, Belgium). This work, which is dated 1634, resembles similar still life paintings by Antwerp painters such as Osias Beert.

The landscapes and history paintings attributed to him are likely copies of paintings by other masters made by him or his studio.
