= Simon Renard de St. André =

French painter

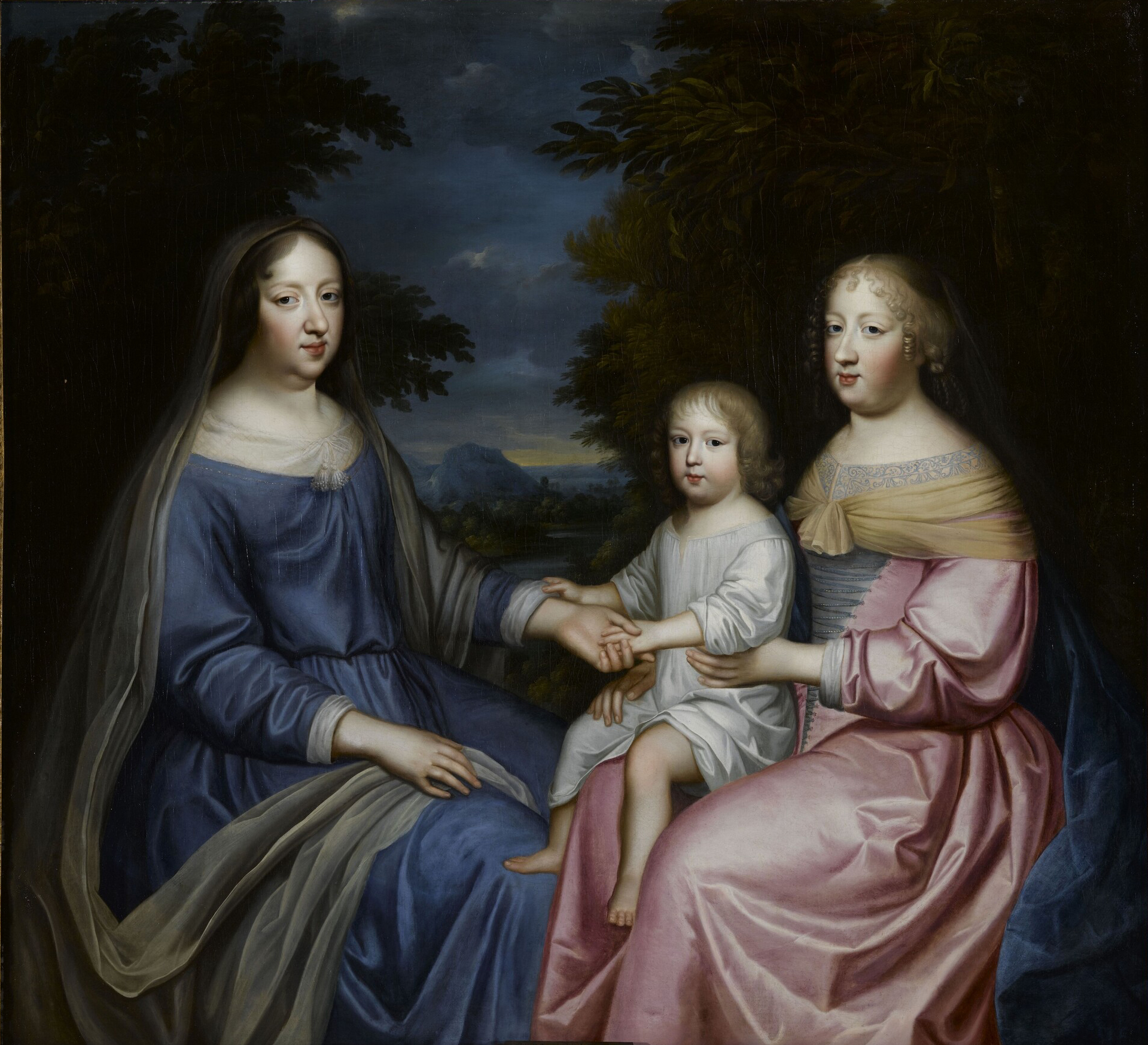
Anne of Austria with the Dauphin and Queen Marie Thérèse, Palace of Versailles

Simon Renard de St. André (1613 or 1614–1677) was a painter and copperplate engraver born in the 17th century in France. In his lifetime, he was regarded as a highly skilled portraitist.

A number of vanitas paintings have traditionally been attributed to the artist. Most of these works have now been attributed to Carstian Luyckx, a Flemish still life painter active in Paris.

Renard was recorded as being the painter to the queen in 1646, and was received into the Académie des Beaux-Arts in 1663.
