= Beersel =

- Municipality
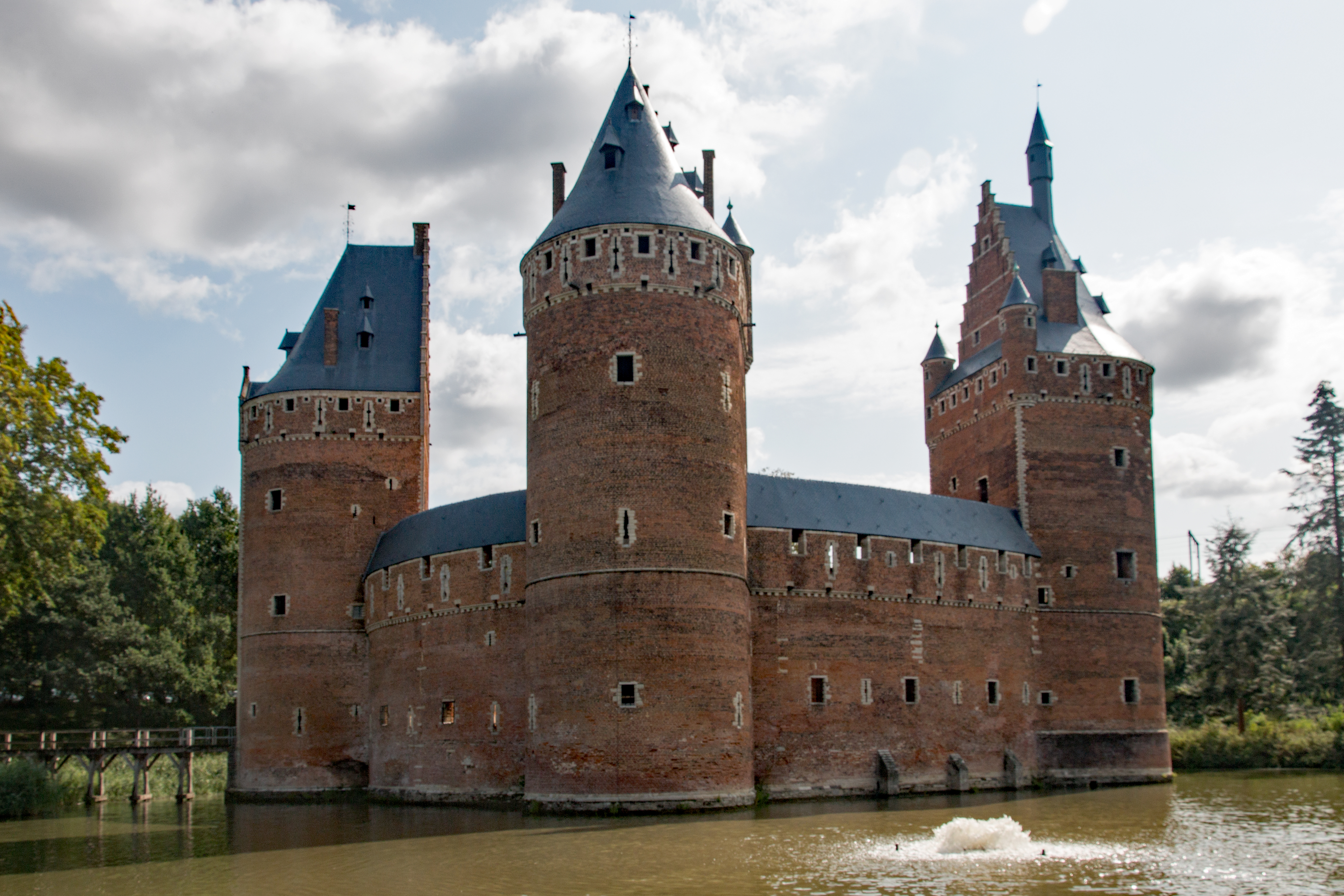
- Beersel Castle, one of the municipality's notable monuments

- Flag Coat of arms

- Beersel in the Province of Flemish Brabant
- Interactive map of Beersel
- Location in Belgium
- Coordinates: 50°46′N 04°18′E
- Country: Belgium
- Community: Flemish Community
- Region: Flemish Region
- Province: Flemish Brabant
- Arrondissement: Halle-Vilvoorde

Government
  - Mayor: Jo Vander Meylen (CD&V)
  - Governing parties: Lijst Burgemeester, N-VA, Open VLD

Area
  - Total: 30.4 km^{2} (11.7 sq mi)

Population (2018-01-01)
  - Total: 25,069
  - Density: 825/km^{2} (2,140/sq mi)
- Postal codes: 1650, 1651, 1652, 1653, 1654
- NIS code: 23003
- Area codes: 02
- Website: www.beersel.be

Beersel (Dutch: [ˈbeːrsəl]) is a municipality in the province of Flemish Brabant, in the Flemish region of Belgium, 12 kilometres (7.5 mi) south-west of the centre of Brussels. The municipality comprises the towns of Alsemberg, Beersel proper, Dworp, Huizingen and Lot. On 1 January 2023, Beersel had a total population of 26.473. The total area is 30.01 km^{2} (11.59 sq mi), which gives a population density of 856/km^{2} (2,220/sq mi).

Beersel is perhaps best known for Beersel Castle, built between 1300 and 1310 by Jean II, Duke of Brabant, as a defense for Brussels. Guillaume Dufay, a notable 15th-century Franco-Flemish composer, was likely born in Beersel. In terms of gastronomy, Beersel is known for its boterham met plattekaas en radijzen (sandwich with white cheese and radishes), usually served with a geuze beer, and for its mandjeskaas (literally 'basket cheese'), which is a white cheese stored in little baskets. Beersel also has two traditional, authentic geuze breweries, Oud Beersel and 3 Fonteinen.

== Notable residents ==
- Eugène Prévinaire (1805–1877, Huizingen), second governor of the National Bank of Belgium (NBB) from 1870 until 1877
- Herman Teirlinck (1879–1967), writer
- Stéphane Demol (1966–2023), assistant manager of the Belgium national football team
- Morten Olsen (born 1949), former football player and manager of the Denmark national football team
- Karel Van Miert (1942–2009), former European Commissioner
- Guillaume Dufay (1397?–1474), Burgundian composer
