= Beersel Castle =

Castle in Beersel, Belgium

- Kasteel van Beersel (Dutch); Château de Beersel (French)
- Beersel, Flemish Brabant
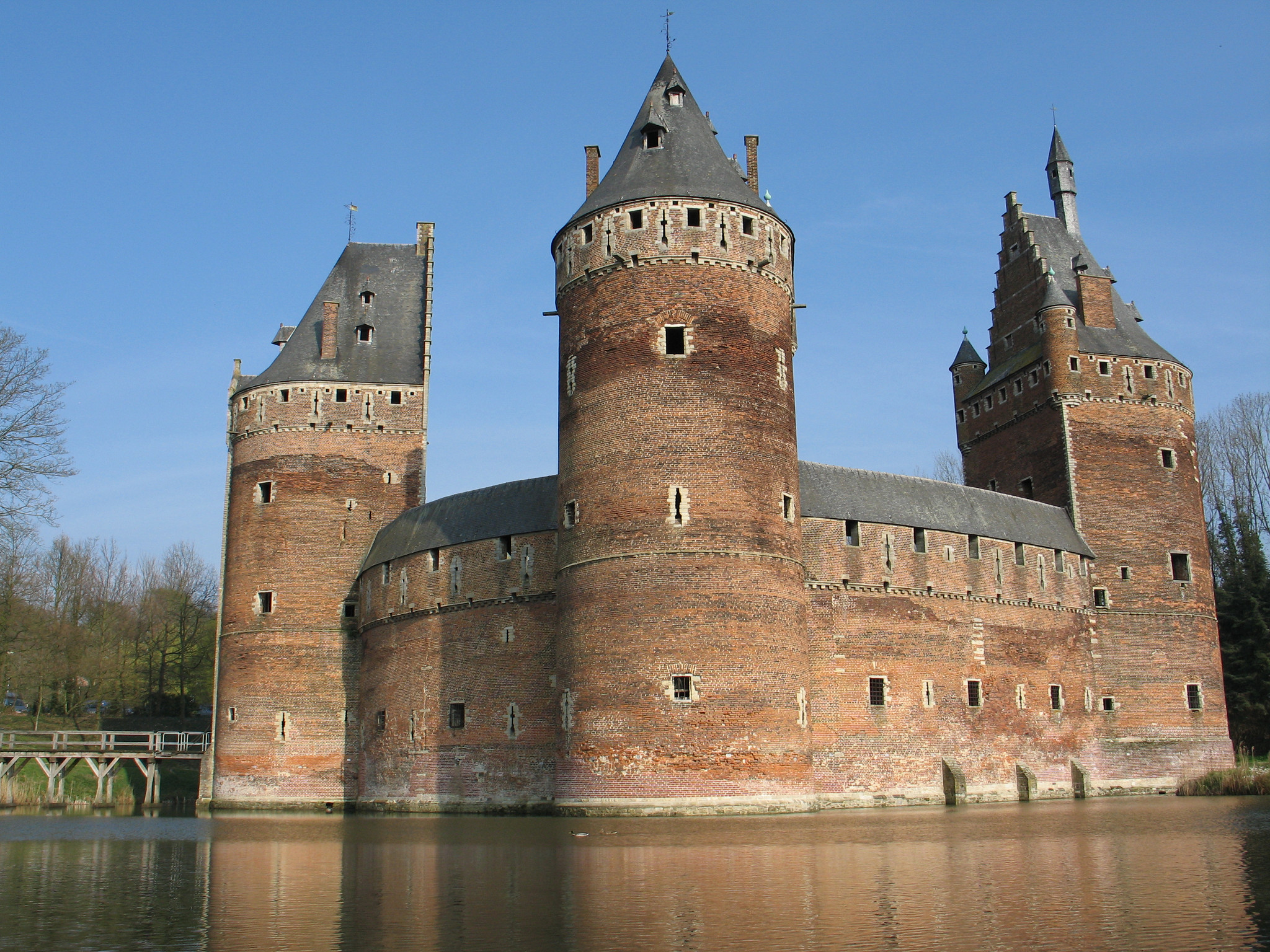
- Beersel Castle, seen from the north-west

Site information
- Type: Castle
- Owner: Royal Association of Historic Residences and Gardens in Belgium
- Condition: Restored

Location
- Coordinates: 50.7657°N 4.2999°E

Site history
- Built: Original castle: 1300–1310; Modern castle: 1357; Restored: 1491–1508, 1617, 1928–39
- Materials: Brick

Beersel Castle (Dutch: Kasteel van Beersel; French: Château de Beersel) is a medieval castle located in Beersel, Flemish Brabant, Belgium. Originating in 1300 under the auspices of the Duchy of Brabant, the water castle's present configuration dates to 1357. It was twice sacked and was subject to significant restorations in 1491 and 1617. Its present condition owes much to a major restoration in 1928–39. Built largely of brick, a rare material for such buildings at the time, around a circular enceinte, its major feature is its three large towers. Nowadays, it is open to the public and is considered one of Belgium's best-preserved castles.

== History ==
=== Construction and history ===
Beersel was located at the frontier of the Duchy of Brabant within the County of Hainaut, south-west of Brabant's principal city of Brussels and near Halle. A fortified residence at the site was attested as early as 1292. In 1300, however, Godefroid of Hellebeke, the first known Seigneur of Beersel, received permission from Jean II, Duke of Brabant, to build a fortification on the present site near his residence. It became one of several Brabantine fortifications in the area, including Gaasbeek Castle. In 1356, during the War of the Brabant Succession (1356–57), the original castle was besieged by soldiers from the County of Flanders, led by Louis of Male, who captured and sacked it.

Beersel Castle was rebuilt from 1357 with a circular enceinte. It had three large and one small tower. During the 14th century, ownership of the castle passed to the Seigneurs of Wittem (Witthem). Henry III of Wittem supported Holy Roman Emperor Maximilian I during the revolts of 1483–1492, placing him at odds with Brussels, which supported the rebellion. Beersel Castle was besieged by Brussels militias twice in 1488 and 1489. During the second siege, the castle was attacked with cannons provided to the rebels by Louis XI of France and fell after several days, sustaining significant damage especially at its southern side.

After the defeat of Brussels, ownership of the Castle of Beersel was returned to the Seigneur of Wittem. Maximilian ordered the Brussels to restore to the castle at the city's own expense. This restoration, begun in 1491, converted the three main towers to accommodate cannons. However, the military obsolescence of castles meant that Beersel became a private residence in the 16th century, losing its military function. In 1581–1606, the Fathers of Zevenborren took up residence in the castle and restoration in 1617 added tiled roofs to the towers and ramparts.

In 1796, the castle became unoccupied and began to deteriorate. In 1818, a cotton factory was created at the site. The property passed through a series of Belgian noble families over the following years and fell into ruin. The French poet and writer Victor Hugo visited in 1877 and wrote a verse about the castle.

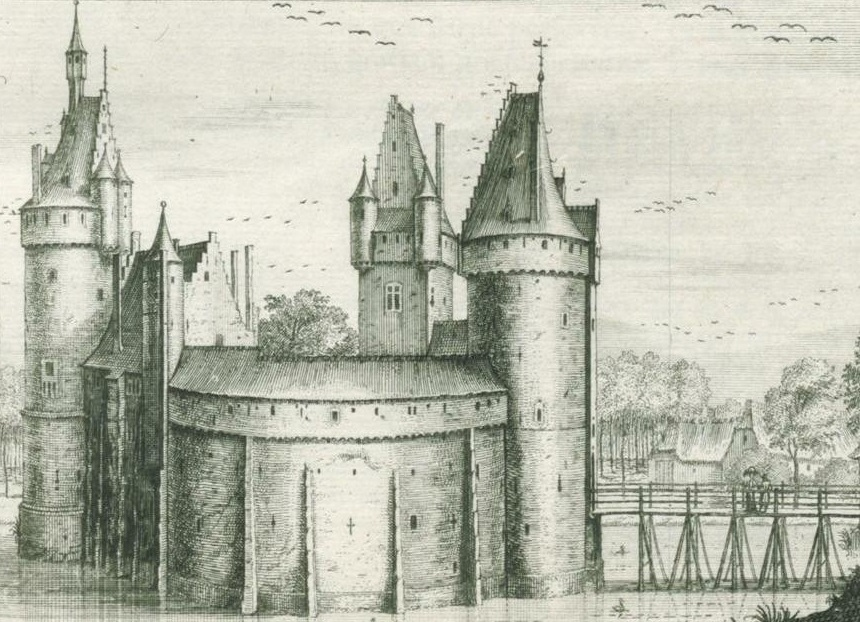
Beersel Castle depicted after the 1617 restoration by Jacobus Harrewijn in Castella et prætoria nobilium brabantiæ (1696)

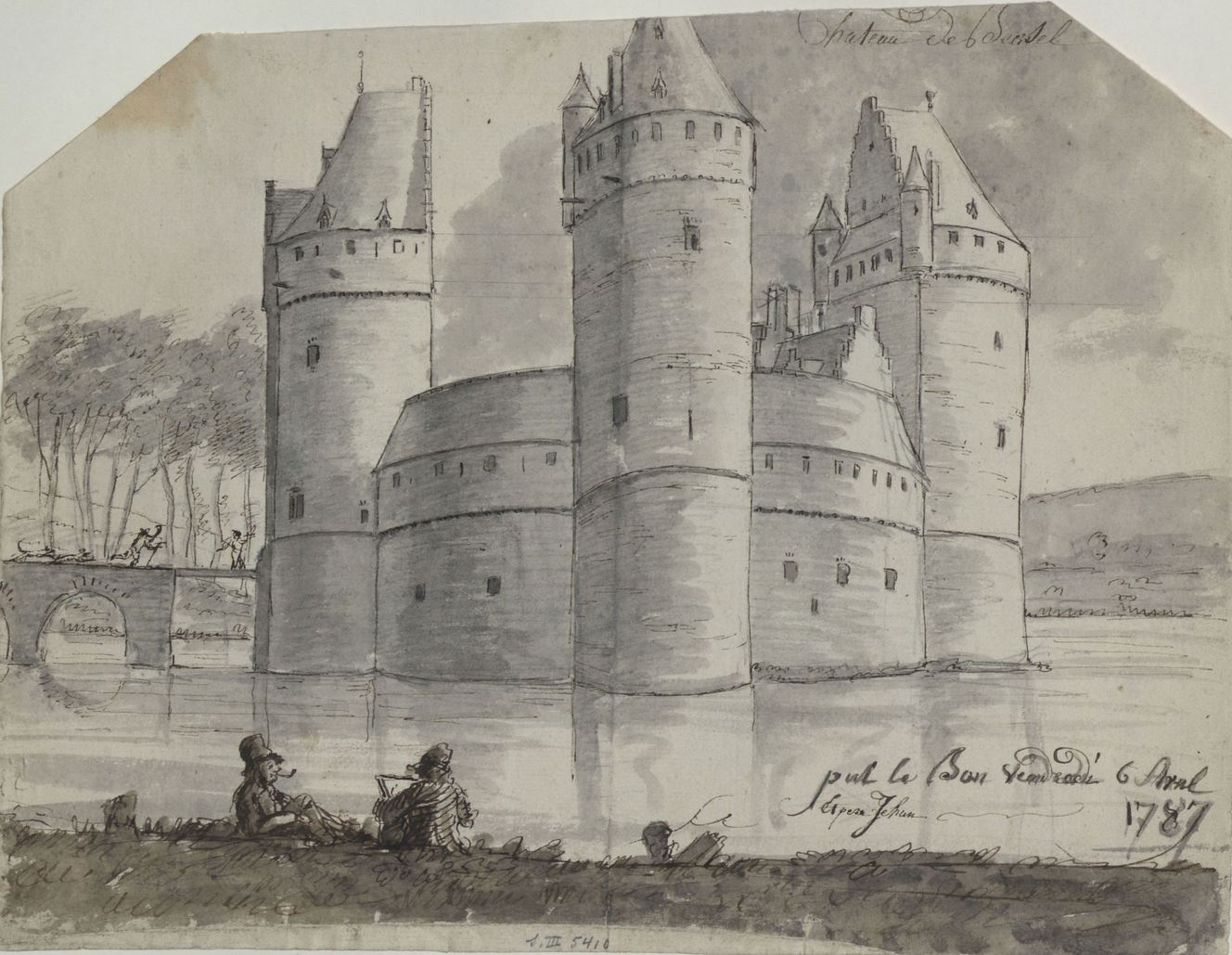
The castle depicted by Paul Vitzthum, son of an Austrian court composer, in 1787

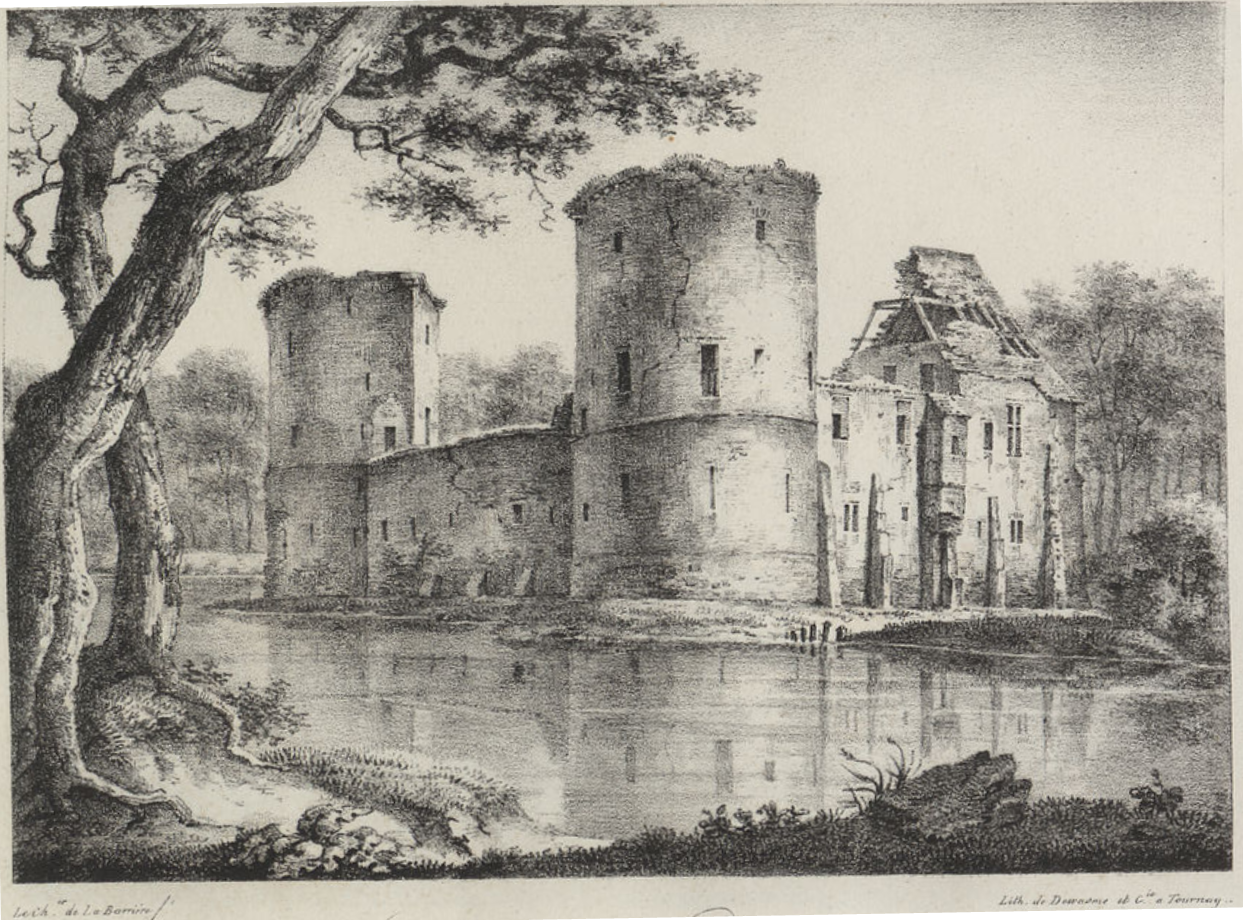
The castle's ruins depicted in Collection des principales vues des Pays-Bas (1823–24)

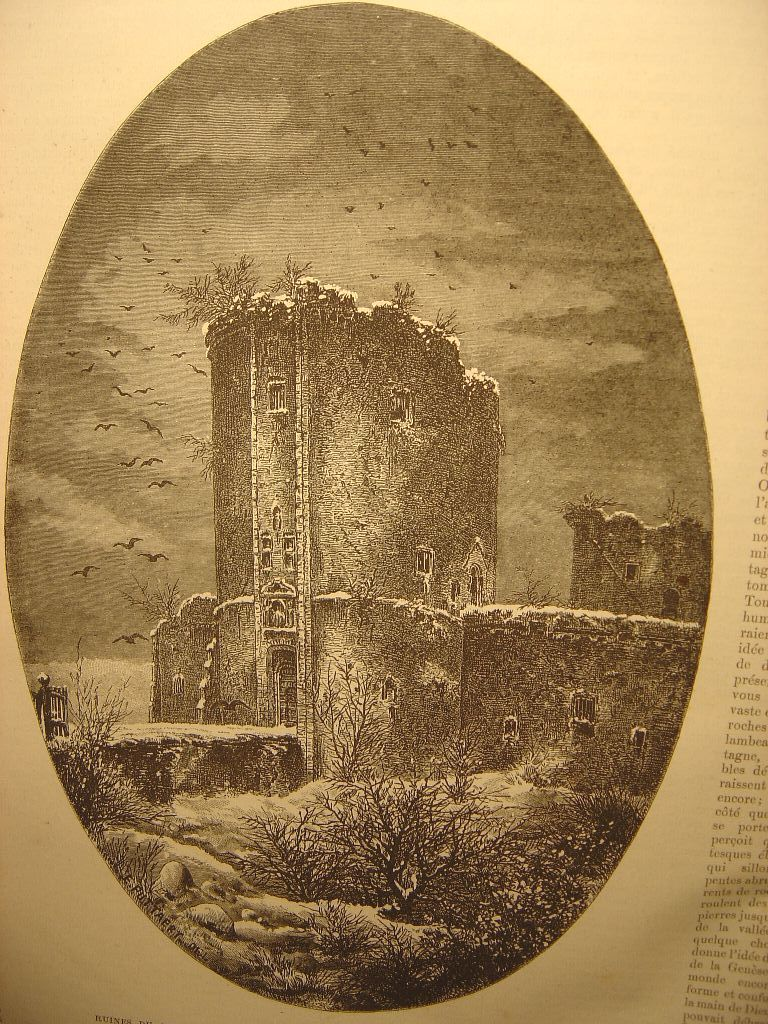
The castle's northern tower, depicted by the Illustration européenne in 1872

=== Restoration ===
In 1928, the derelict castle was donated by the House of Merode to an association known as the League of Friends of Beersel Castle (Ligue des Amis du Château de Beersel). A significant period of restoration began in 1928 and concluded in 1939, which restored the three towers and some of the ramparts to their post-1617 appearance. The residential building and the eastern face of the castle had nonetheless deteriorated significantly and were not included in the restoration. Only the foundations of the building now remain.

The castle was added to the list of scheduled historical monuments in 1934. Since 1948, it has been the property of the Royal Association of Historic Residences and Gardens in Belgium (Koninklijke Vereniging der Historische Woonsteden en Tuinen van België), which has leased it to the municipal authorities of Beersel.

The castle is open to the public, and was subject to a government-supported restoration project between 2008 and 2012. It is located near to the E19 motorway and adjacent to the Line 26 railway, whose raised bank passes close to the castle's southern and eastern sides.

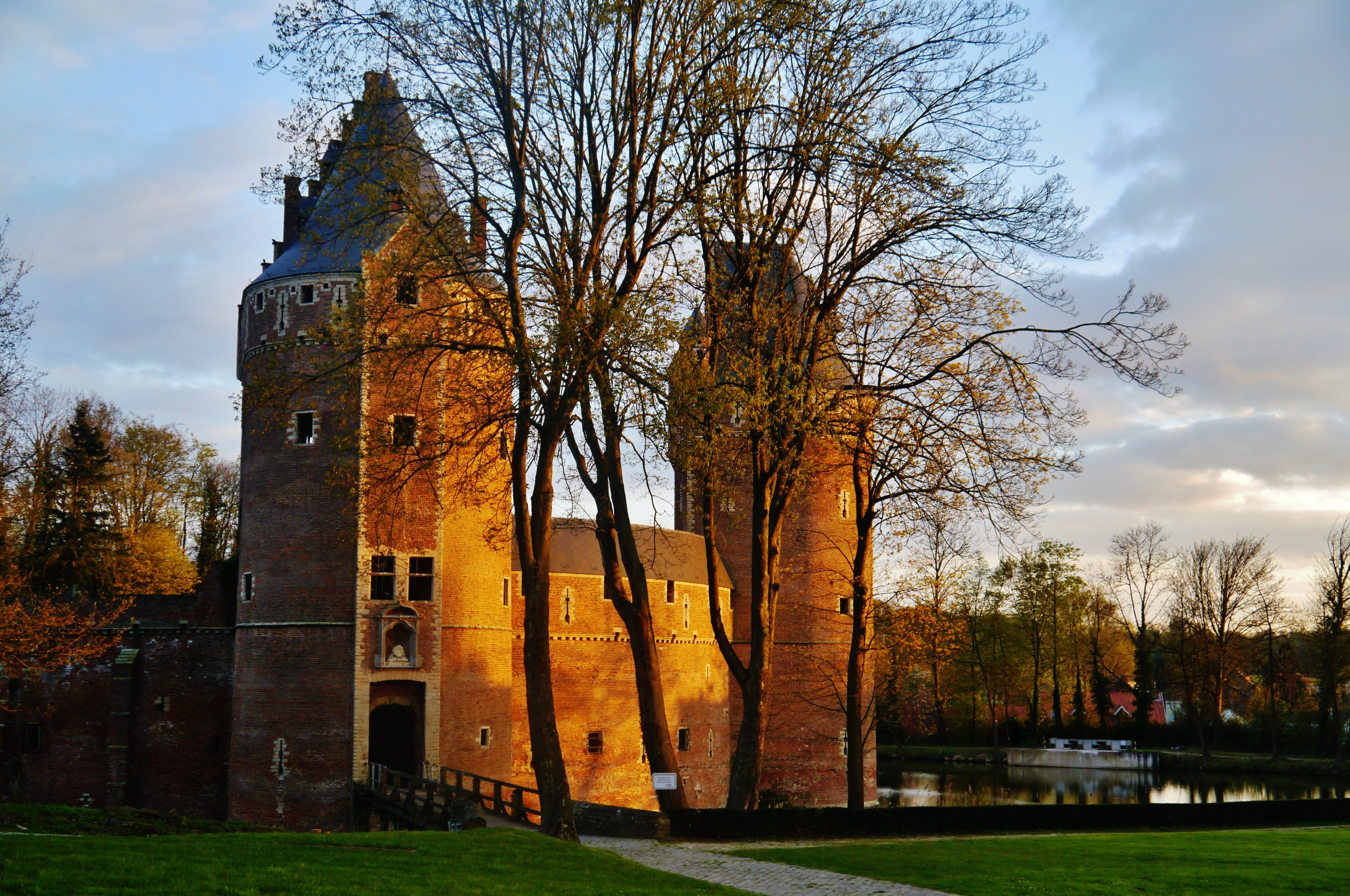
View of the northern gatehouse

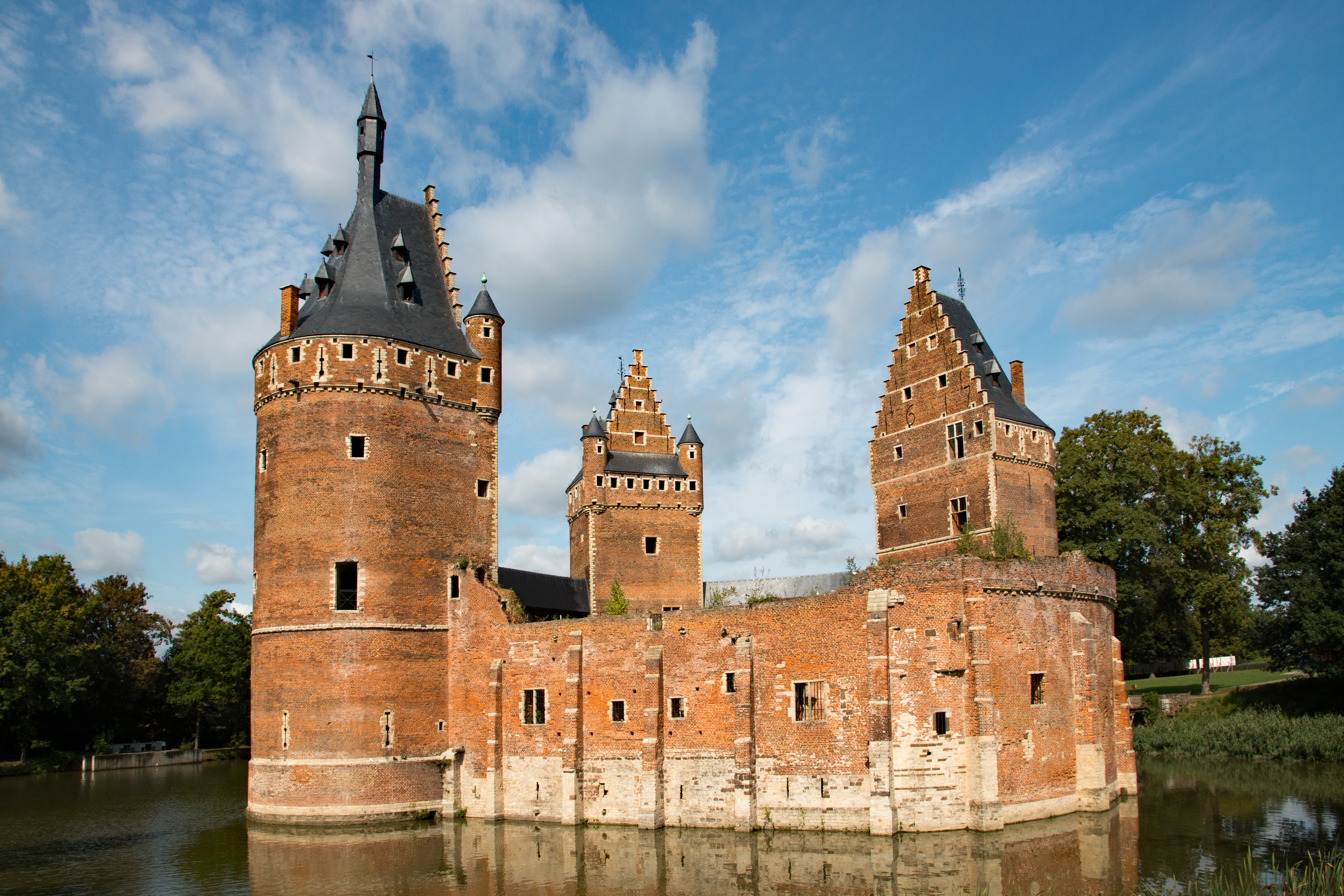
View of the eastern side

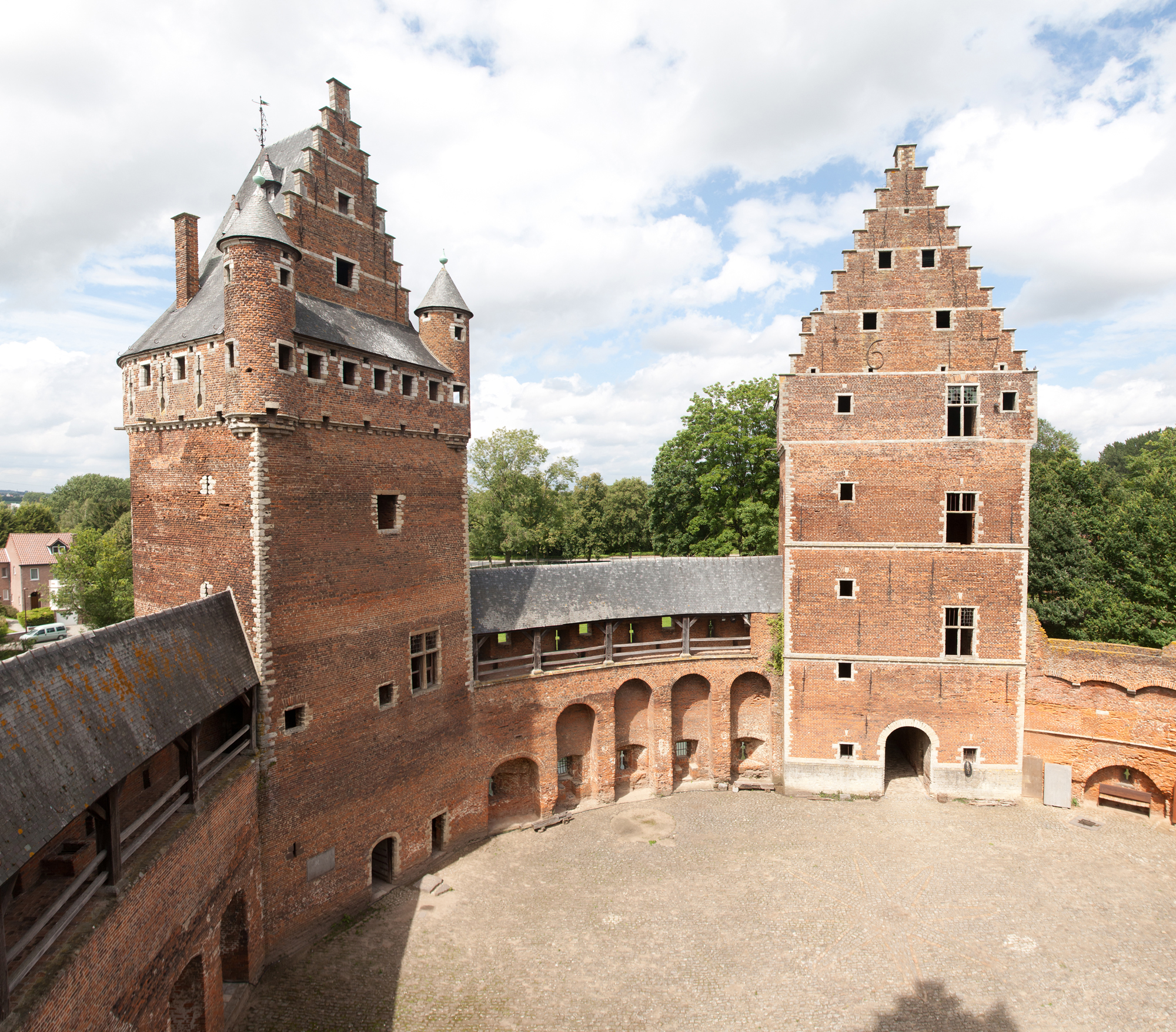
Internal view of the gatehouse (right) and western tower (left)

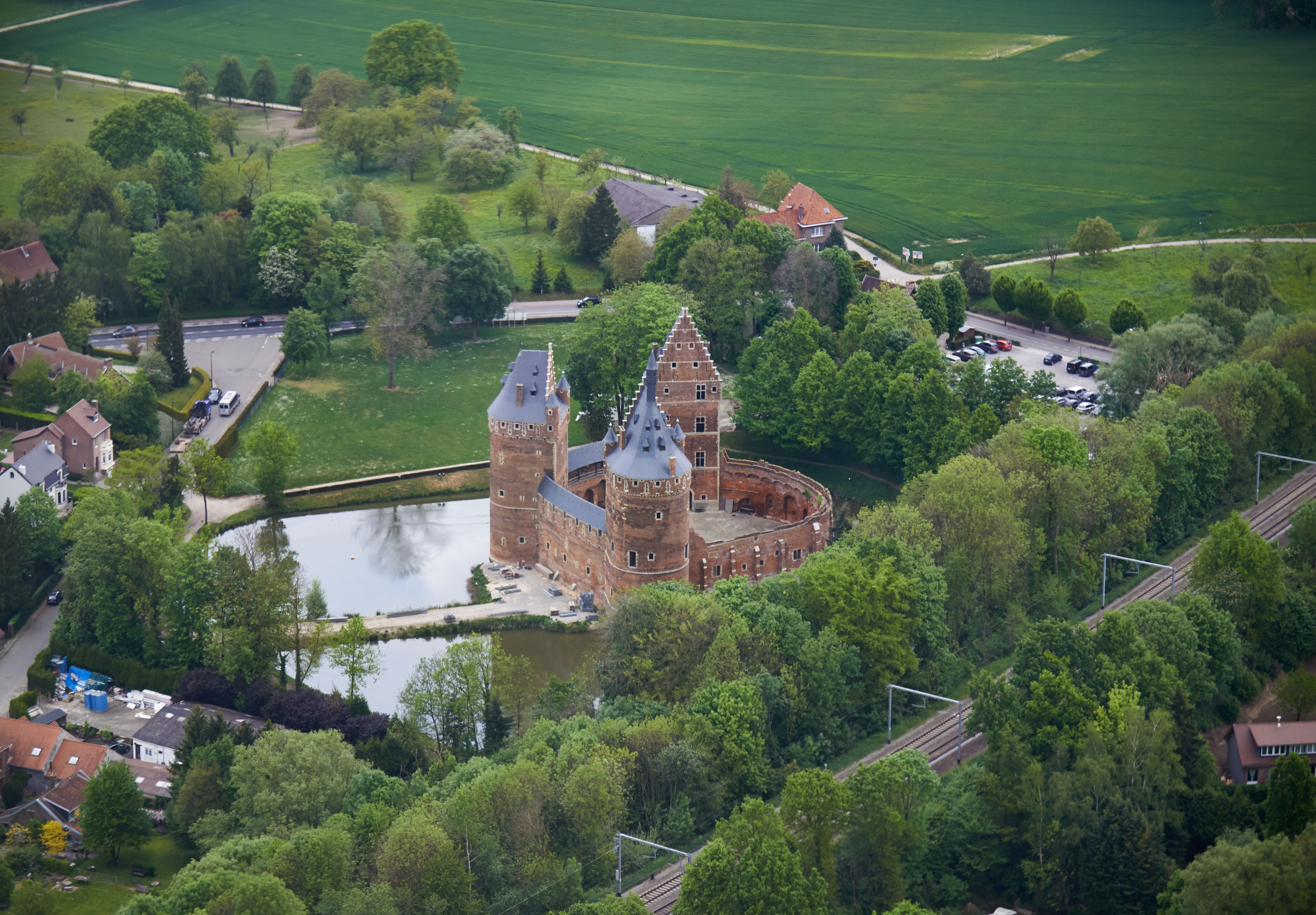
Aerial view from the south

== In popular culture ==
Beersel is considered one of Belgium's best-preserved castles and has appeared in popular culture. It was the subject of a Victor Hugo poem in 1877. It also features prominently in the 1954 comic book De schat van Beersel by Willy Vandersteen which forms part of his Spike and Suzy (Suske en Wiske) series.

In the video game Age of Empires II: Definitive Edition, the unique castle architecture of the Burgundian civilisation is based on Beersel Castle.

== See also ==
- List of castles and châteaux in Belgium
- Groot-Bijgaarden Castle
