= Parrot tulip =

Tulip cultivar group

Tulipa Parrot Group
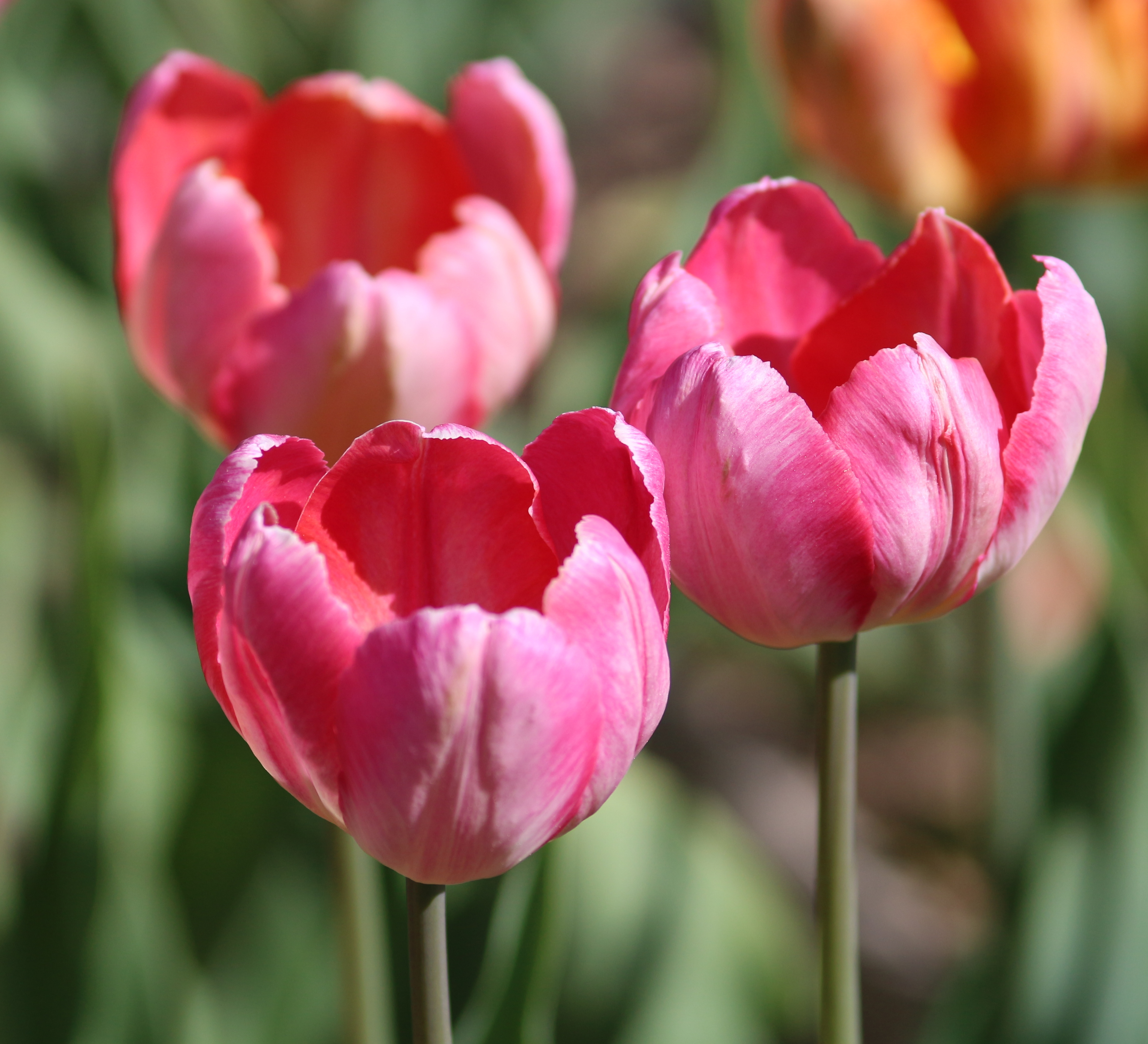
- 'Apricot Parrot'
- Genus: Tulipa
- Cultivar group: Parrot Group
- Origin: France

Parrot tulips are a tulip cultivar group known for their bright colors and petals. The petals have a "serrated" or "fringed" look. The flowers bloom in late spring and reach a size of almost 5 inches (13 cm) in length. Although they are perennials by nature٫ they are often grown as annuals. Parrot tulips come in a wide variety of colors, usually being brightly colored, but can come in darker colors. The flowers originated in France and were brought to the Netherlands in the 18th century.

The flower buds are green in color, but as the flowers mature, their bright colors start to appear. Parrot tulips not a species but are a group of cultivars with the name Tulipa Parrot Group. Parrot tulips are the result of natural mutations to single late tulips and triumph tulips. During the 17th and 18th century the most notable mutations were to color patterns with growers attempting to influence the color of the tulips using pigeon droppings, old plaster and even dirty waste water from the kitchen. It wasn't until the late 19th century that the source of these mutations was isolated as the tulip breaking virus. Later in the 20th century, radiation was used to cause mutations in these tulips to search for new colors and patterns.

== Description ==
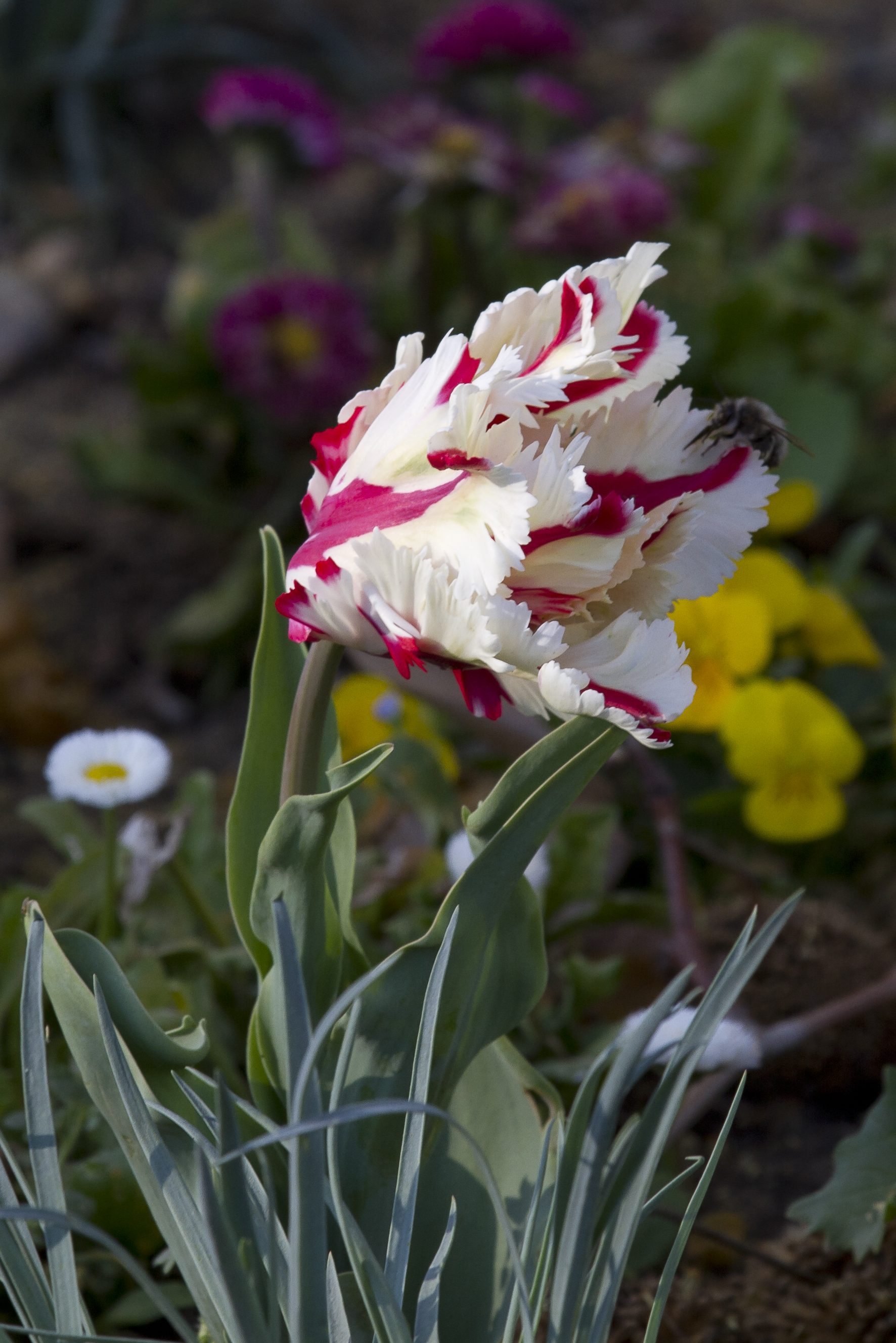
An 'Estella Rivnfeld' flower

The parrot tulip is characterized by ruffled petals and bright colors. The flowers are somewhat curled, especially at the edge of their petals and are some of the showiest tulips in competition. The plant itself can grow to 22 inches (56 cm) tall with the flower being on average around 5 inches (13 cm) across. The parrot tulip is more puffy and expanded than some other tulips, with other tulips being more inward and curled up. They get their name from their exotic colors and shape, as the petals resemble the feathers on a parrot and parrots tend to have bright colors. Parrot tulips, just like other tulips, grow two or three bluish green leaves that are clustered together at the base of the plant. There are many varieties of parrot tulip. A few include the 'Rainbow' cultivar that, hence its name, has rainbow-colored flowers. The 'White Lizard' cultivar has a pure white color, with light purple near the bottom of the flower and a petal shape different from other parrot tulips. The 'Estella Rijnveld' cultivar can either be white with red streaks or red with white streaks. The 'Negrita Parrot' cultivar comes in several different shades of purple; such as indigo, violet, and magenta.
