= Rodenbach Brewery =

Belgian brewery

Coordinates: 50°56′47″N 3°08′15″E

Brouwerij Rodenbach
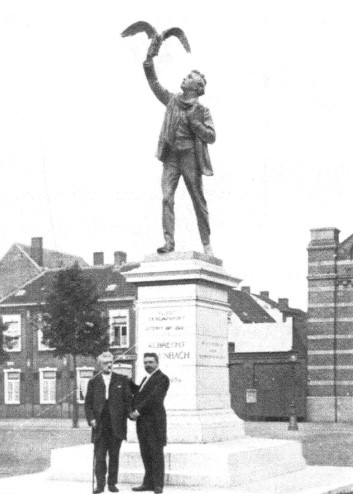
- Industry: Alcoholic beverage
- Founded: 1821
- Founder: Pedro, Alexander, Ferdinand and Constantijn Rodenbach
- Headquarters: Roeselare, Belgium
- Products: Beer
- Production output: 180 000 hL
- Owner: Palm Breweries
- Website: www.rodenbach.be

Rodenbach is a brewery in Roeselare, Belgium, now owned by Palm Breweries. It is noted for its barrel-aged sour beers in the Flemish red style.

== Brewery ==
In 1821, the four Rodenbach brothers (Pedro, Alexander, Ferdinand and Constantijn) invested in a small brewery in Roeselare, in the West Flanders province of Belgium. The brothers agreed to a partnership for fifteen years. At the end of this period, Pedro and his wife, Regina Wauters, bought the brewery from the others and Regina ran the business while Pedro served in the military. Their son Edward later took over the brewery (1864), and it was during his directorship that the brewery saw great growth.

Edward's son, Eugene, took over in 1878 and, in preparation for this position, travelled to England where he learned how to ripen beer in oak barrels and then mix old and young beers. It was this method of producing beer that Rodenbach became famous for. As Eugene produced no male offspring, a public limited liability corporation was created and most shares remained in the hands of descendants of the Rodenbachs until 1998 when the brewery was sold to Palm Brewery.

After the take-over, Palm quickly stopped production of Rodenbach's Alexander beer, a cherry-flavoured beer. However, in recent years, Palm/Rodenbach has produced and distributed, first, Rodenbach foederbier, which is served only from cask, and is unfiltered and unblended. It comes straight from an oak ripening barrel and is not processed further. More recently, the brewery has produced Vin de Céréale, sold only in bottles. This is similar to foederbier, but has been in the barrel longer (about three years) and has been formulated for more alcohol. Foederbier is usually 5-6 percent, while Vin de Céréale is 10 percent.

From 1980 until 2000, Rodenbach supplied the yeast and bacteria culture that provided their distinctive taste profile and sourness to De Dolle Brouwers in nearby Esen for use in some of their beers. They had historically also sometimes supplied yeast to Westvleteren Brewery and Brouwerij Felix in Oudenaarde.

== Beers ==
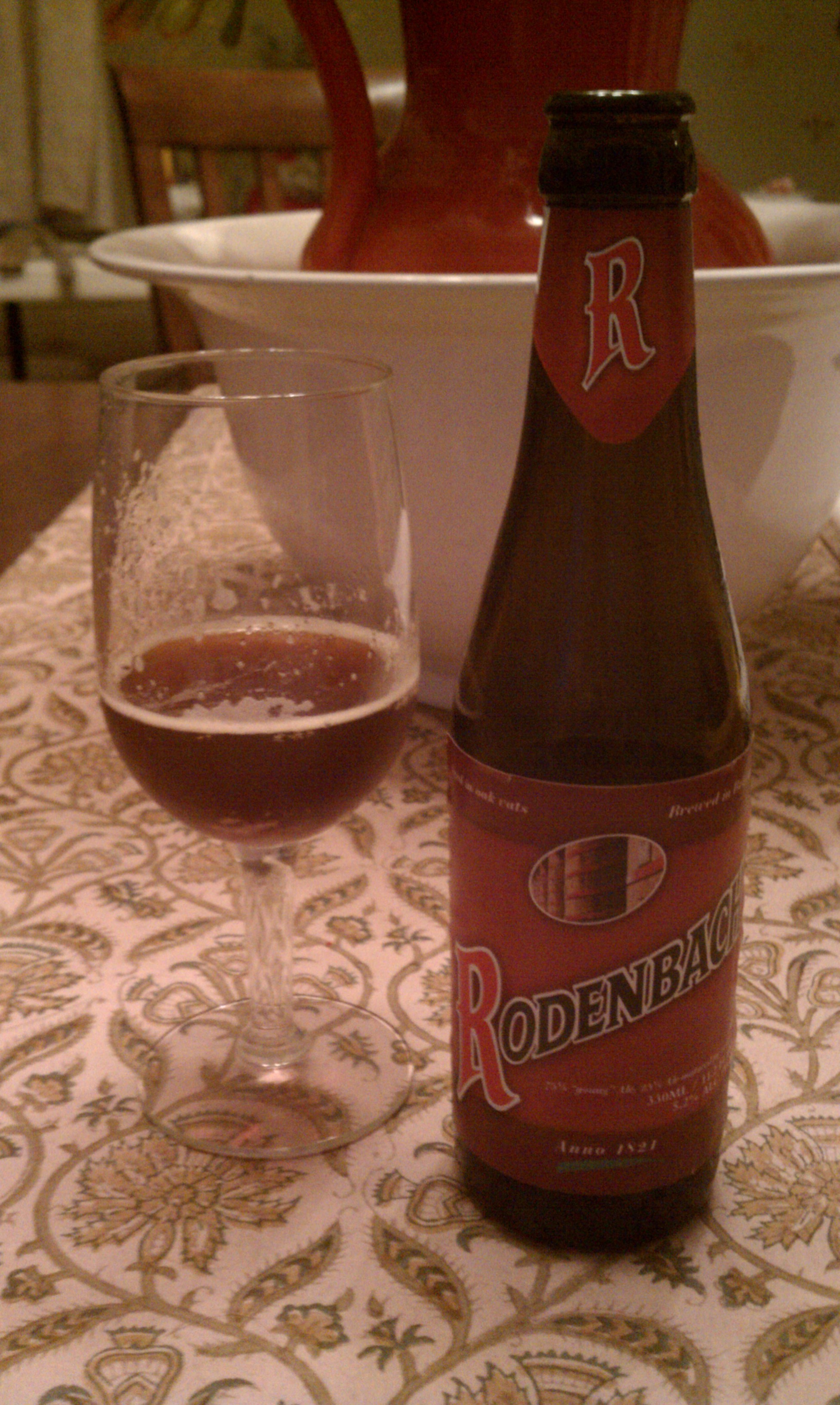
A Rodenbach Original

There are several different types of Rodenbach beers:

- Rodenbach Original (5.2% ABV) blended from aged and young ale (25%/75%)
- Rodenbach Grand Cru, a winey beer (6% ABV) which contains less young ale (67%/33%)
- Rodenbach Vintage beer, this beer is unblended aged beer from a single cask selected for its qualities by a tasting panel, formerly sold as Grand Cru
- Vin de Céréale, an aged beer that is 10% ABV
- Caractère Rouge, beer, already having undergone maturation, that is put through further aging and maceration with cherries, raspberries, and cranberries

In commemoration of the brewery's 150th year of activity, it produced Rodenbach Alexander, a variant of Original with cherry flavor. Its name comes from the brewery founder, Alexandre Rodenbach.

== Gallery ==
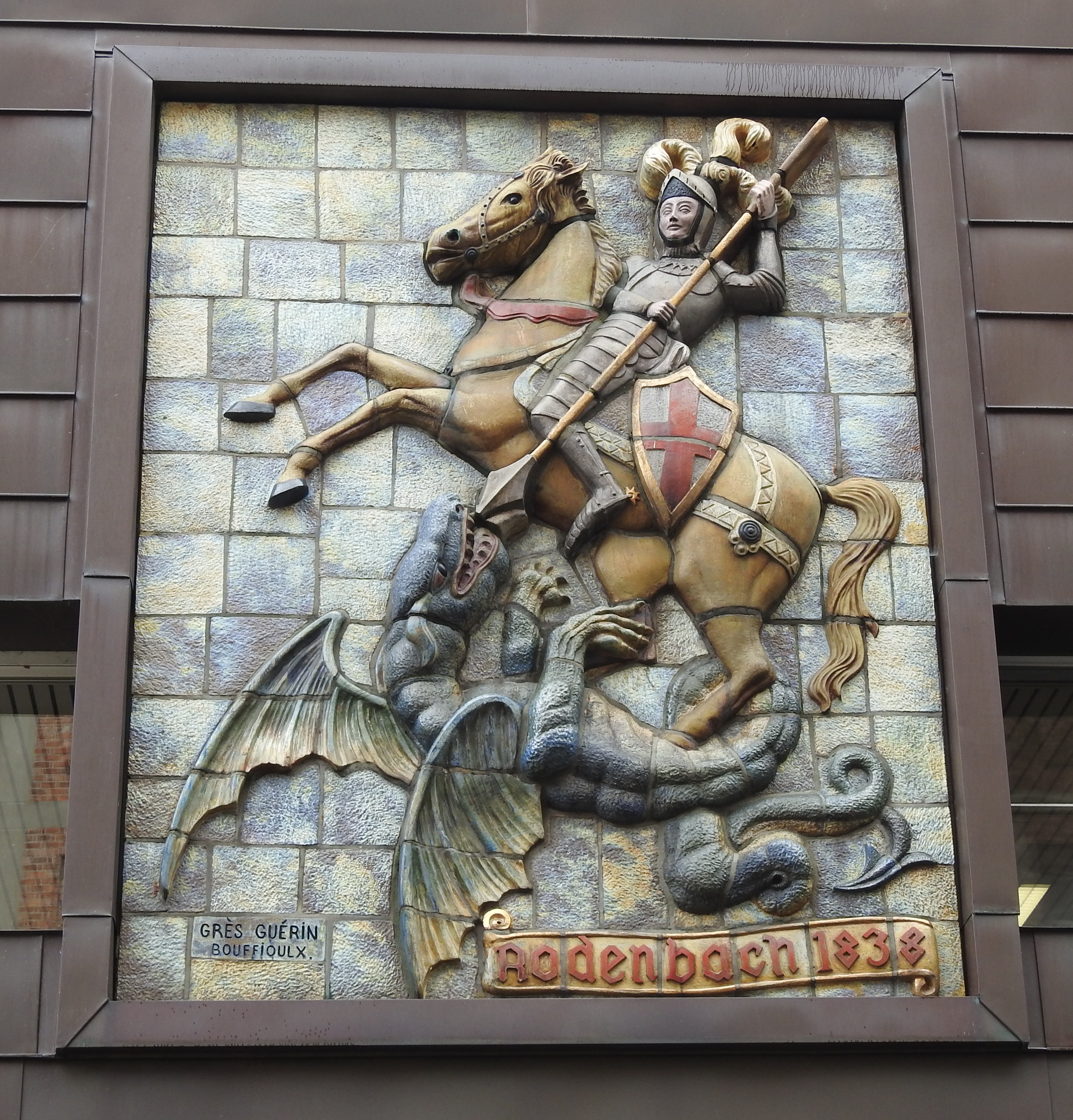
Rodenbach coat of arms

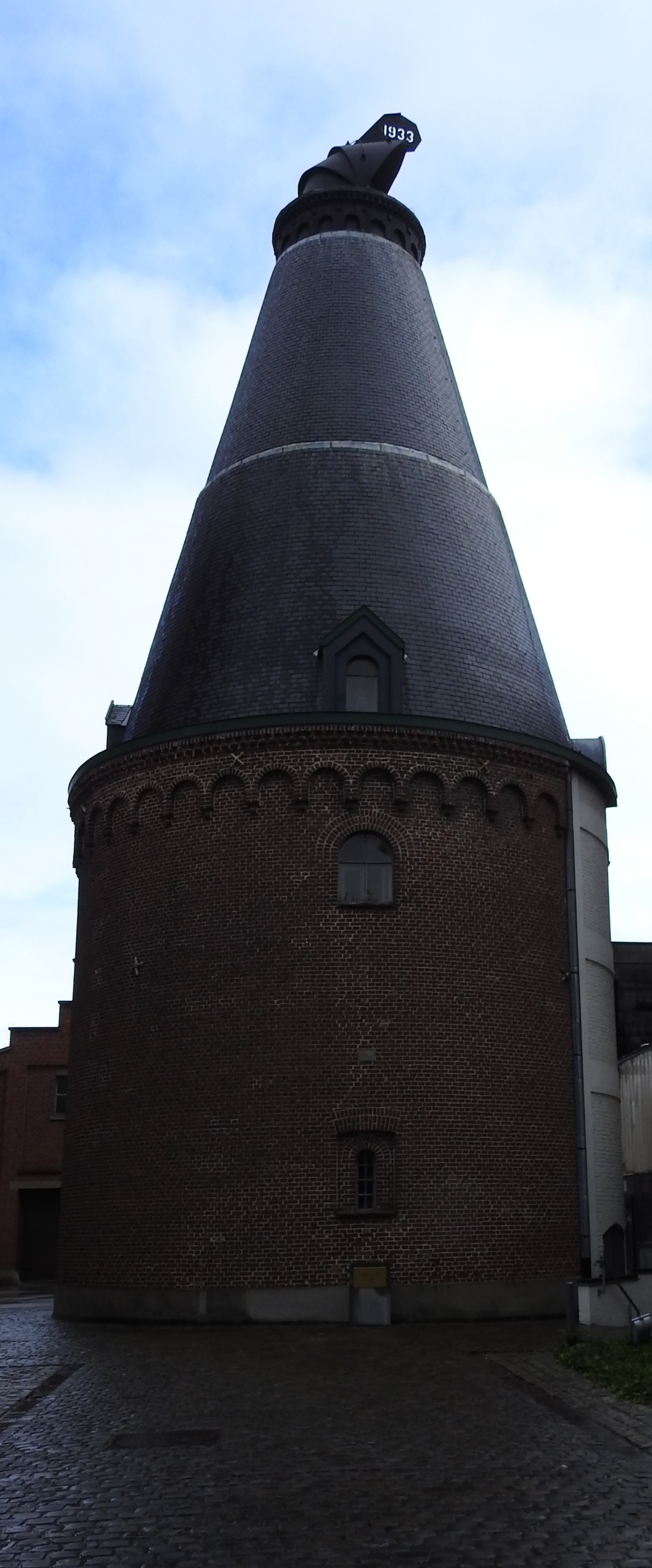
Rodenbach original malt kiln

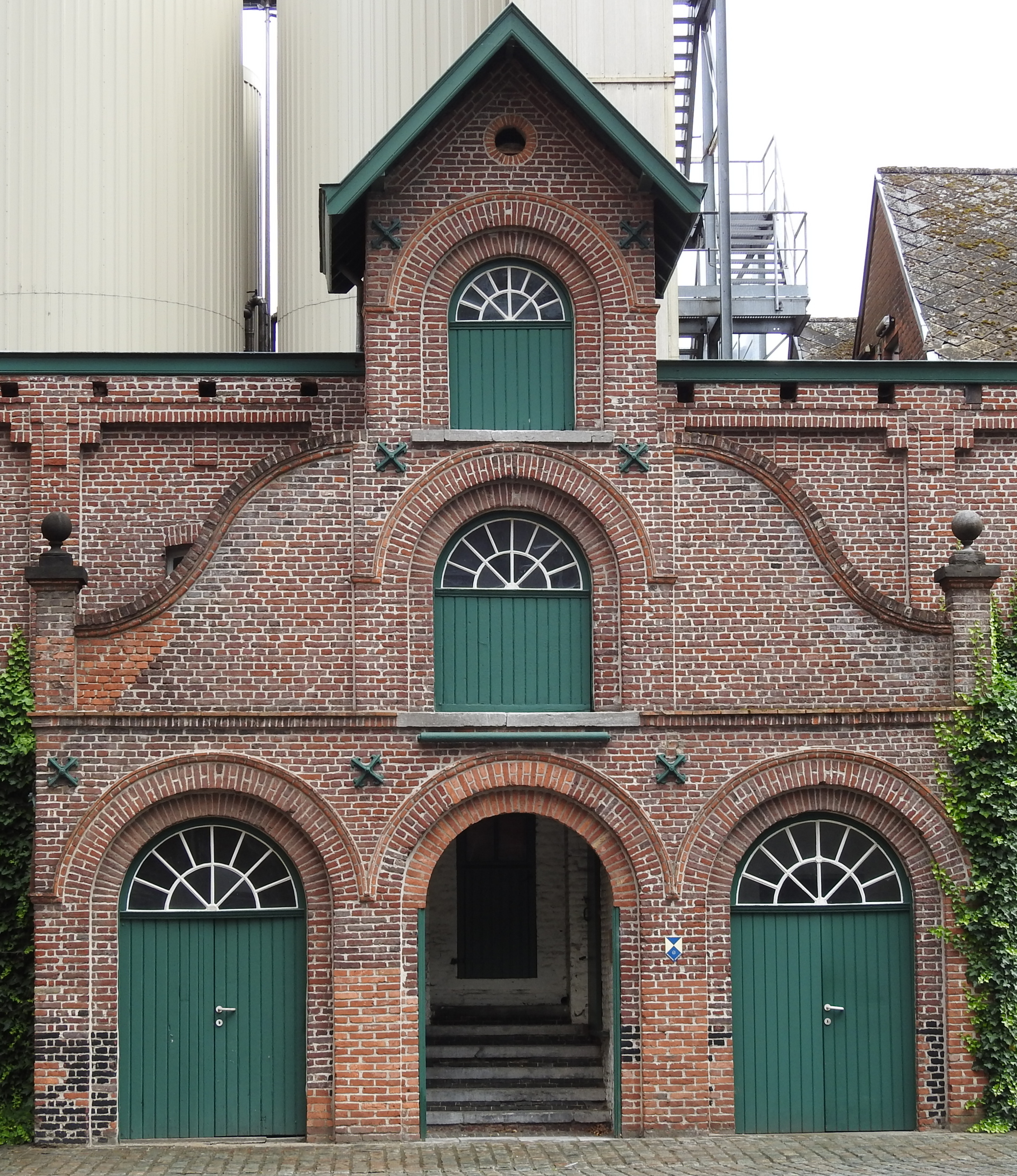
Entrance to old brewery

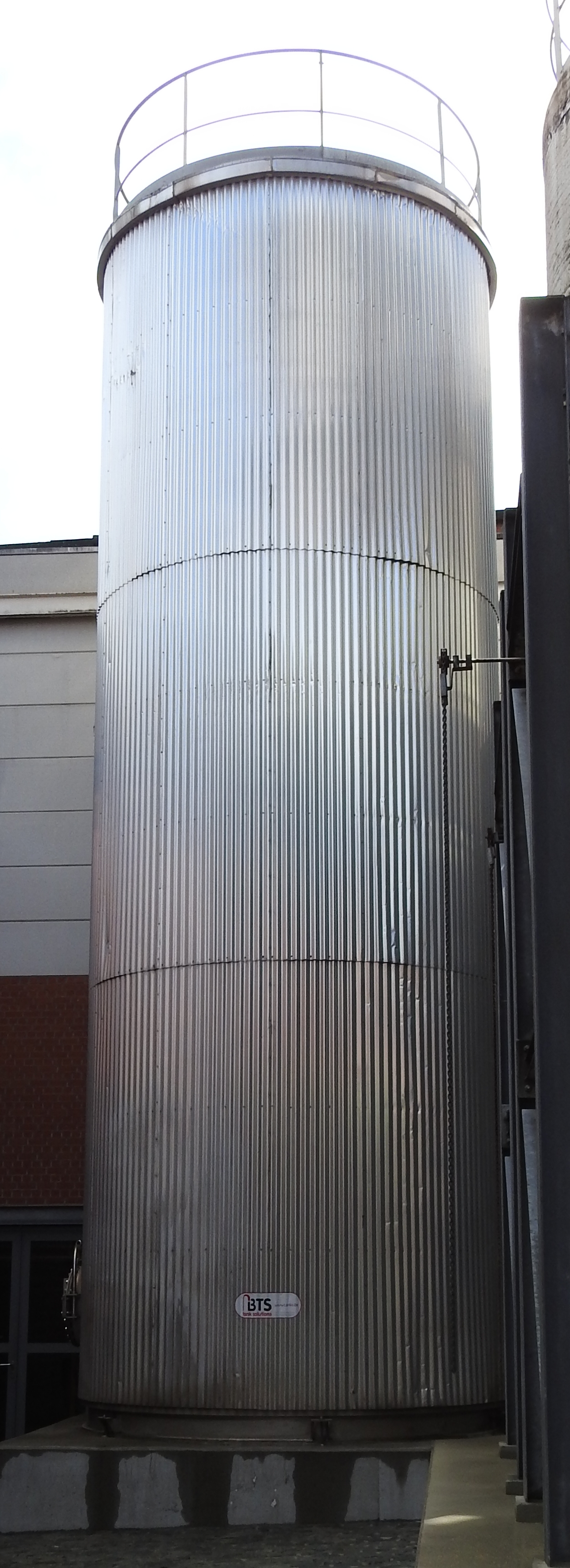
Grain silo

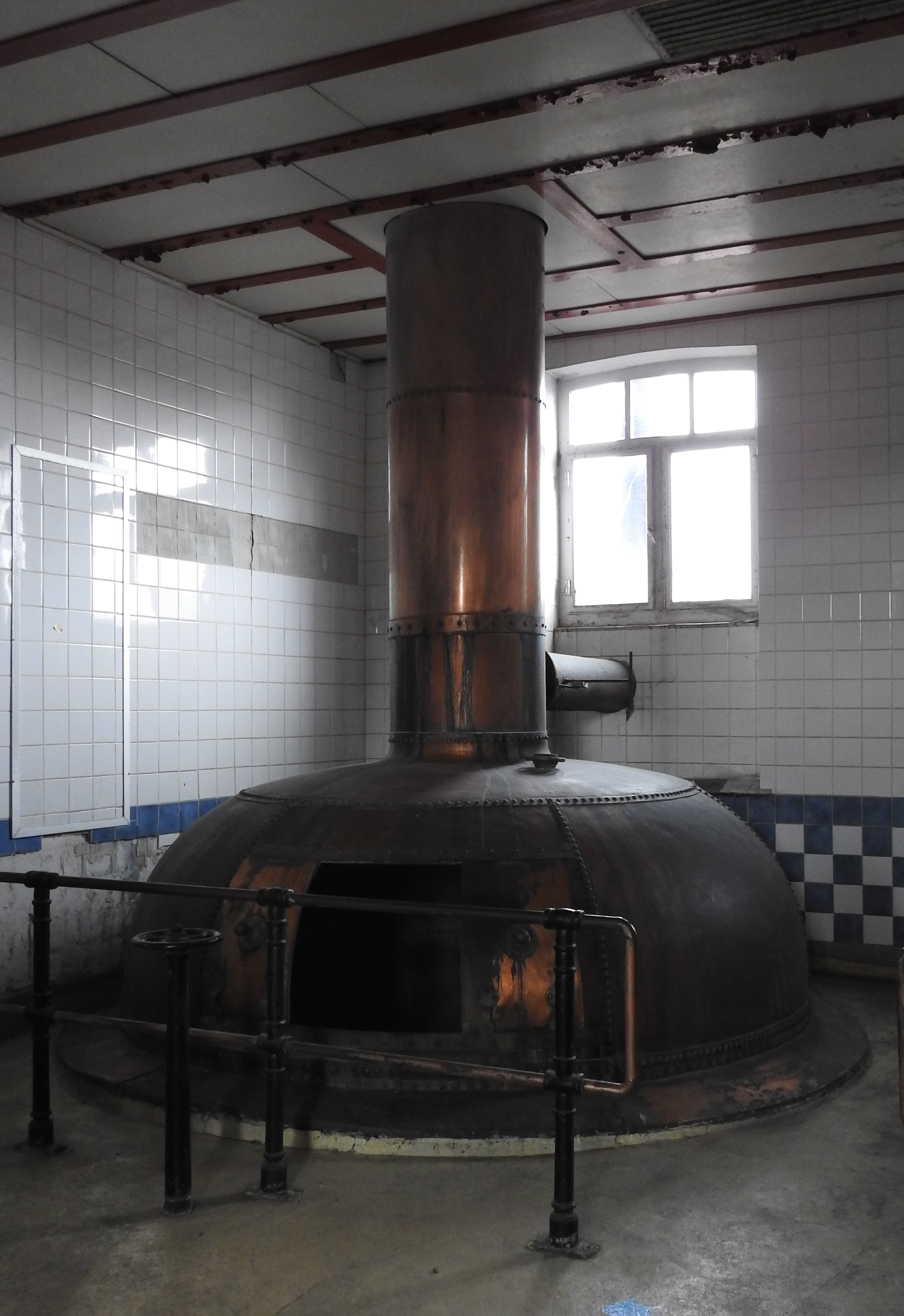
Old copper wort cooker

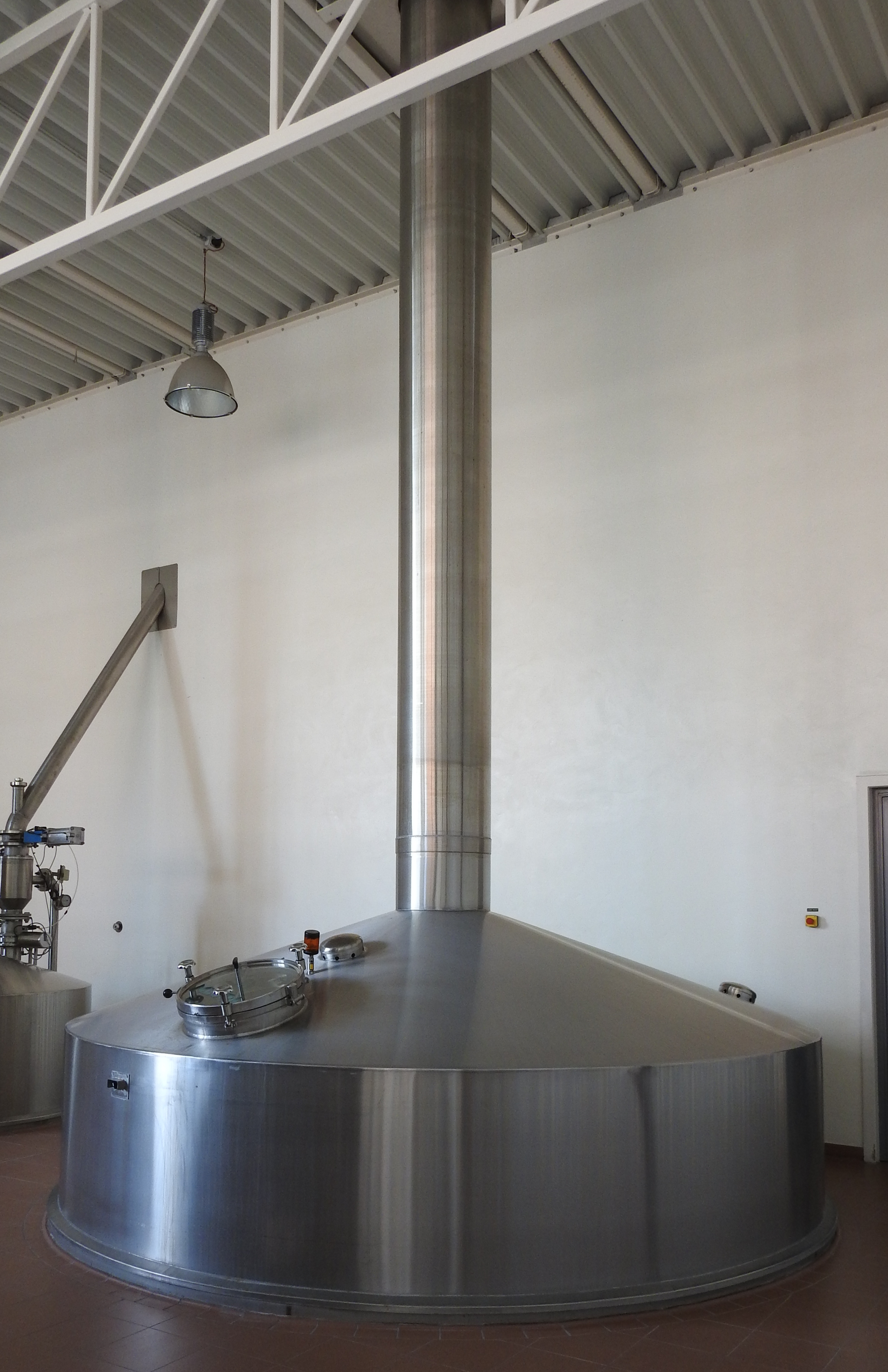
Modern wort cooker

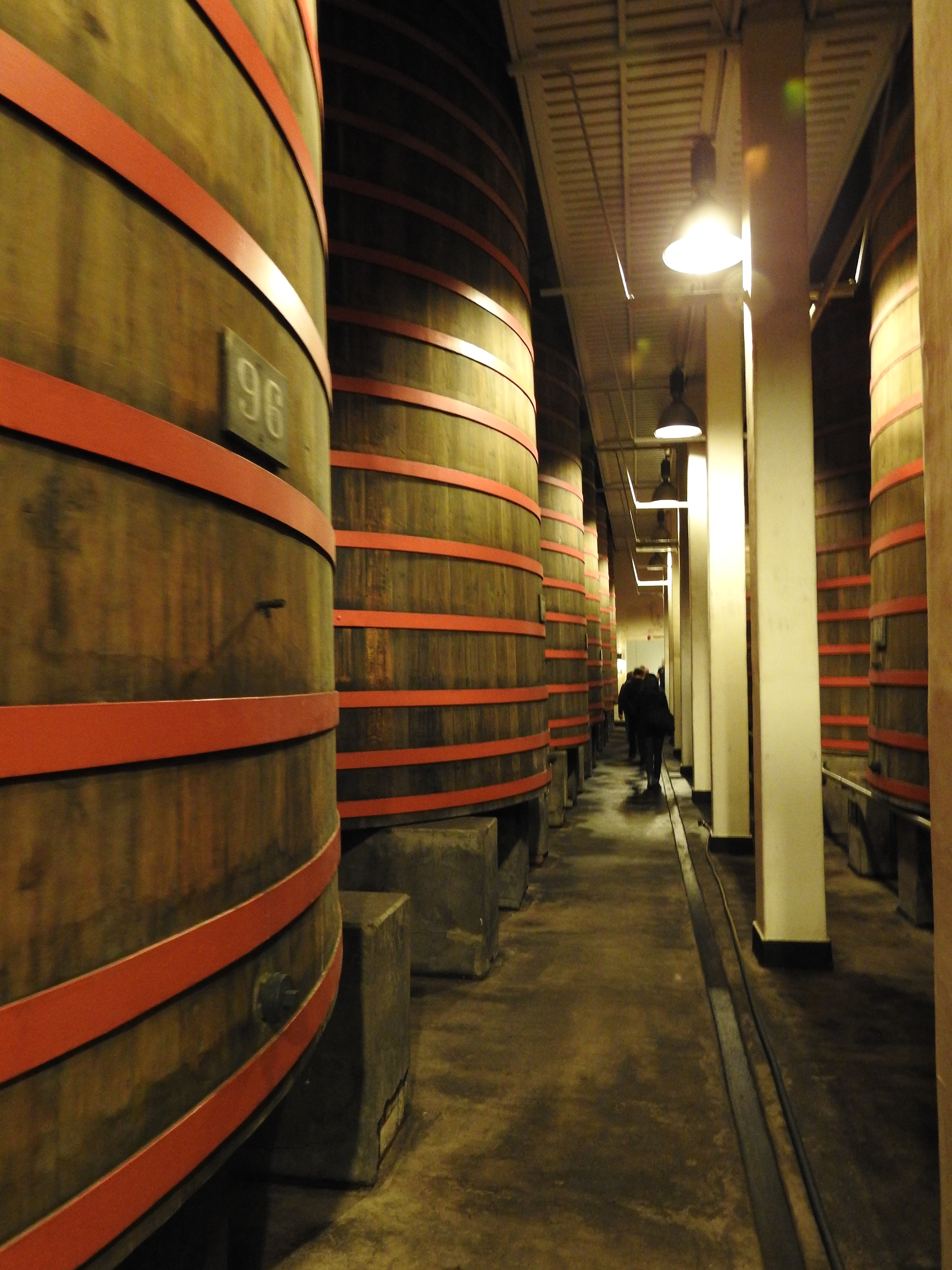
Rodenbach Brewery aging barrels

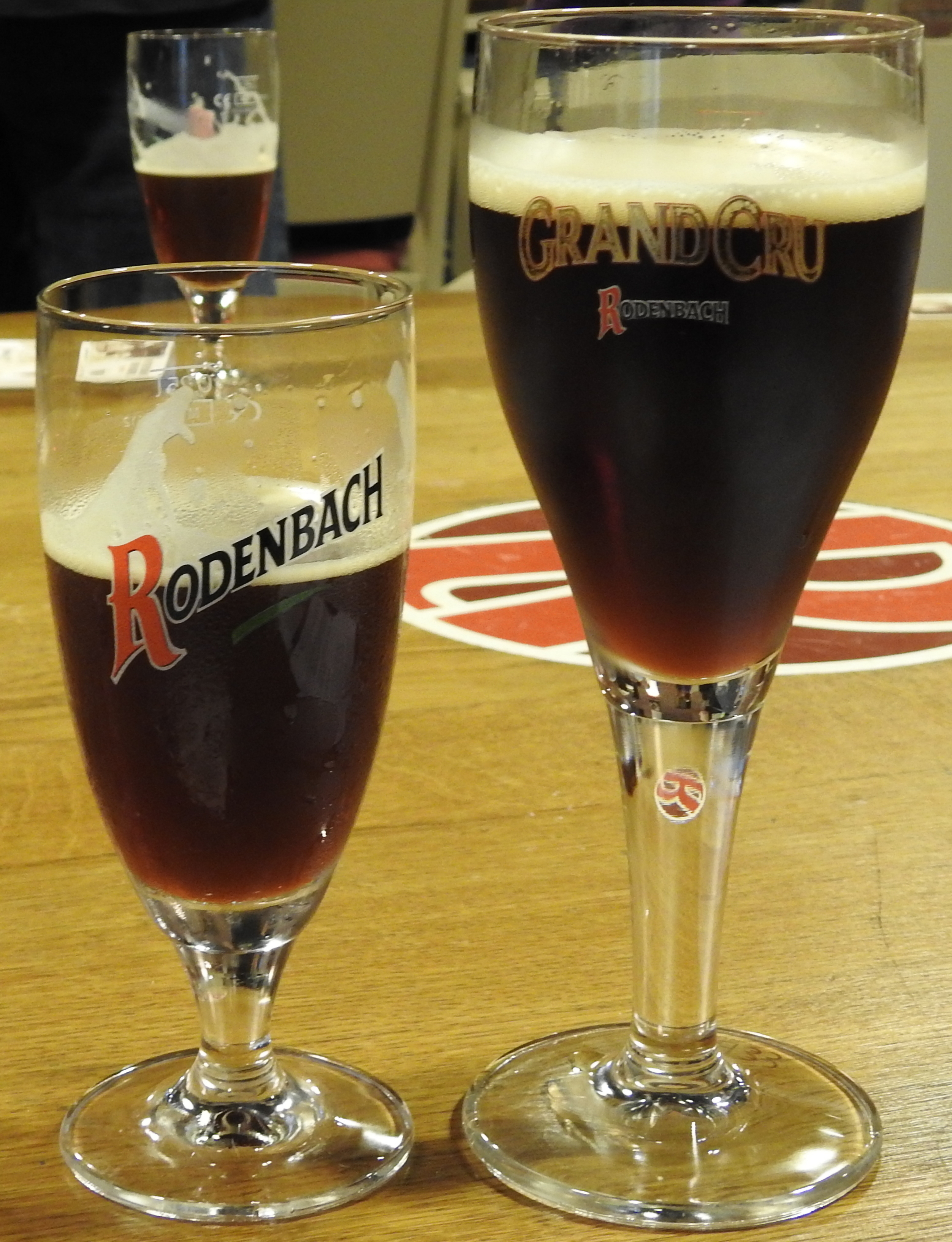
Rodenbach Original and Grand Cru

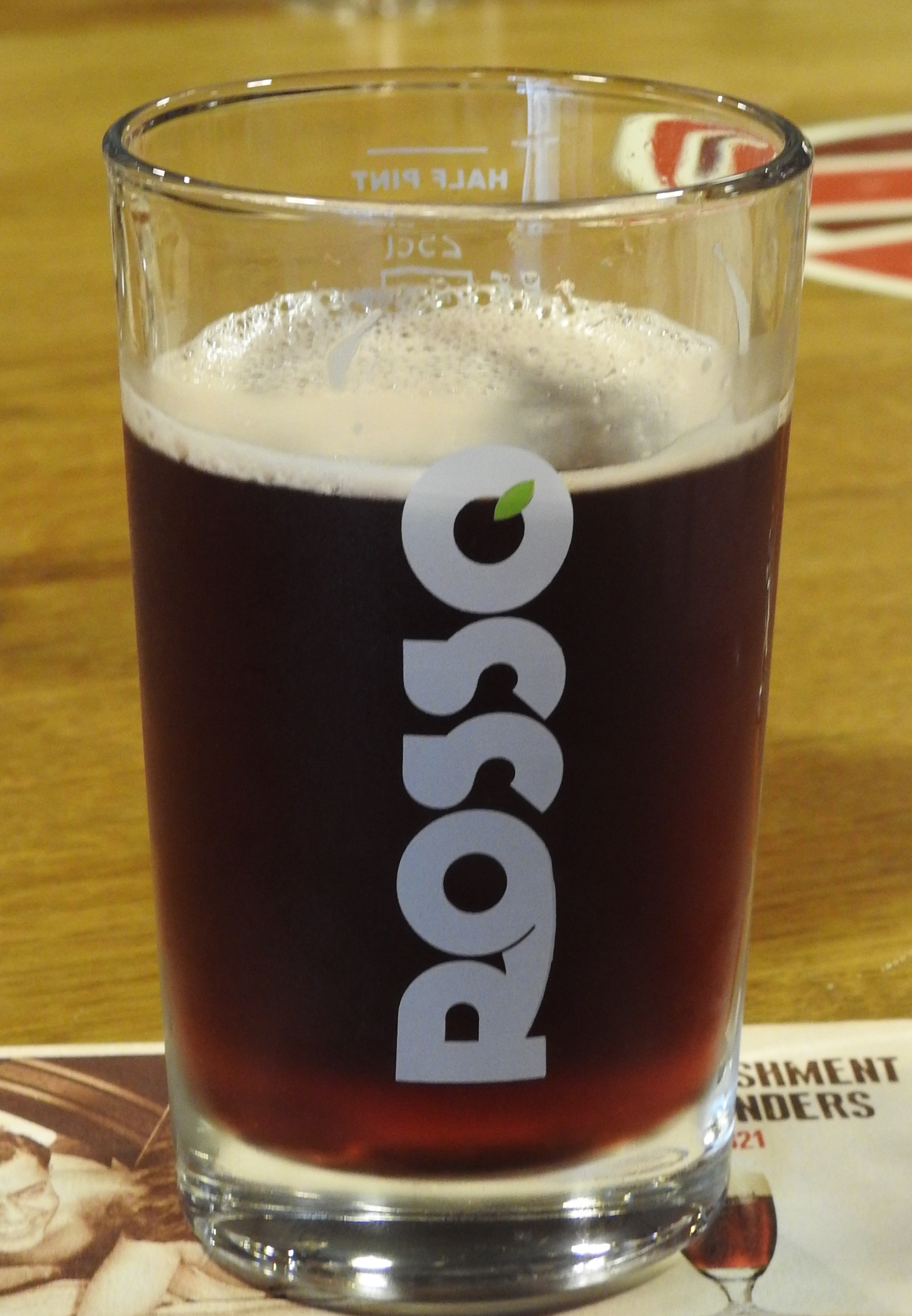
Rodenbach Rosso, a sweet kriek (cherry) lambic-like beer
