= Palm Breweries =

Belgian company

Coordinates: 51.0006°N 4.27129°E

- Industry: Alcoholic beverage
- Founded: 1597
- Headquarters: Steenhuffel, Belgium
- Products: Beer
- Production output: 1200000 hL
- Parent: Royal Swinkels
- Website: http://www.palm.be

Palm Breweries is a brewery company. It owns several different Belgian breweries. Total production was 1,700,000 hl of beer in 2004. The brewery was a member of the Belgian Family Brewers society until 2016.

== History ==
As early as 1597, records can be found in Steenhuffel's archives detailing a manor named Den Hoorn.

The first signs of brewing activity at Steenhuffel came in 1747. A deed of census mentions two breweries, De Hoorn and De Valck. De Hoorn, owned then by Jean-Baptiste De Mesmaecker, was later to develop into the brewery we know today.

In 1908, Henriette De Mesmaecker, great-granddaughter of Jean-Baptiste De Mesmaecker, married Arthur Van Roy. Arthur Van Roy oversaw the running of their pub and farm, and eventually became the driving force behind the construction of the brewery as we know it today.

The De Hoorn brewery was not spared the violence of World War I, and although it was completely destroyed in 1914, Van Roy decided to rebuild it. He chose to still top-ferment his beer in the old Brabant style rather than brew it using newer methods, such as those used to brew Pilsner.

In 1929, Van Roy decided to give his beer a proper name, calling it Speciale Palm. Speciale refers to the style of beer "Special Belge".

In 1930 Arthur Van Roy taught his son, Alfred, how to brew beer. This, coupled with what Alfred learned at the Brussels brewing school, led to the first copper brewing room with a mill being built. This brewing room is known as "Brewing Room 1" today.

In August 2014, a new small brewing installation was installed where experimental brews of 1000 liters can be brewed. The brewery is named after the former village brewery in Steenhuffel. In the same month, the Steenhuffel brewery announced that it will henceforth be known as Palm Belgian Craft Brewers (PALM nv-sa for short).

Palm had a total production capacity of 1 million hectoliters in 2015 and achieved a turnover of 53 million euros that year. In that year it realized a modest profit of 475,000 euros for the first time in many years. The rise of heavy specialty beers has reduced the share of Palm beers from 80% of production in 2006 to less than 50% in 2016.

On May 10, 2016 the Dutch Bavaria Brewery bought Palm Belgian Craft Brewers.

== The beers ==
- Brewed in Steenhuffel:
  - Palm Speciale (5.4% ABV) amber colored;
  - Dobbel Palm stronger and darker, only sold in December replacing Palm Speciale;
  - Palm Royale (formerly Royal Van Roy Ale) (7,5% ABV) brewed on the occasion of Alfred Van Roy's 90th birthday;
  - Steendonck (5% ABV), a classical white beer;
  - Palm Hop Select (6.0% ABV) a blonde beer with hops grown in the brewery's own garden, launched in 2013.
- Brewed in Roeselare: see Rodenbach
- Brewed in Bruges:
  - Brugge Tripel (8.7% ABV) amber colored;
  - Brugge Blond (6.5% ABV);
  - Steenbrugge Dubbel
  - Steenbrugge Tripel
