= Regina Wauters =

Regina Wauters (1 March 1795 – 24 January 1874) was a Belgian businesswoman and brewer. She was instrumental in founding the Rodenbach Brewery in Roeselare.

== Biography ==
Born in Mechelen, Regina Wauters was the daughter of a rich local brewer. She married Pedro Rodenbach in 1818 and moved to Roeselare in West Flanders, Belgium, where his family had a distillery.

In 1821, Pedro, along with his brothers and sister, acquired a brewery. The brothers agreed to a fifteen-year partnership. At the end of this period, Pedro and Regina bought the brewery from the others, with Regina running the business while Pedro served in the military during the Belgian revolution.

Rodenbach bought the distillery from his family in 1835. He died in Brussels in 1848. His family sold the distillery to Regina Wauters, Her distillery remained for a long time the only significant distillery in Roeselare. Regina extended it immediately after she bought it. Later she asked her eldest son, Raymond, to work in the distillery. Raymond Rodenbach would continue to run the distillery until c.1895. The distillery was later sold to Honoré Talpe who transformed it into a chicory factory.

Regina invested her money not only in the distillery of the Rodenbachs but also in their brewery. In 1836 the family Rodenbach sold the brewery in Roeselare with numerous other properties. Pedro Rodenbach would buy most of it with the money of Regina. Pedro had to sign legal documents to recognize her as sole proprietary of the brewery and any other property that he had bought from his family.

Regina immediately began to expand the brewery. Although she succeeded in building one of the largest distilleries in the region, she would fail to create the largest brewery in the city. She suffered from the fierce competition with Anna Gesquiere, who also ran a brewery in Roeselare.

In 1860 her son Edward Rodenbach came to work in the brewery and it was during his directorship that the brewery expanded outside Roeselare. In 1864 Regina sold him, at the age of 69, her brewery, her house and workshops, along with eleven bars she had bought. Regina Wauters would retire to live on her private means until her death in 1874.
