= Esen, Belgium =

Esen
- Deelgemeente
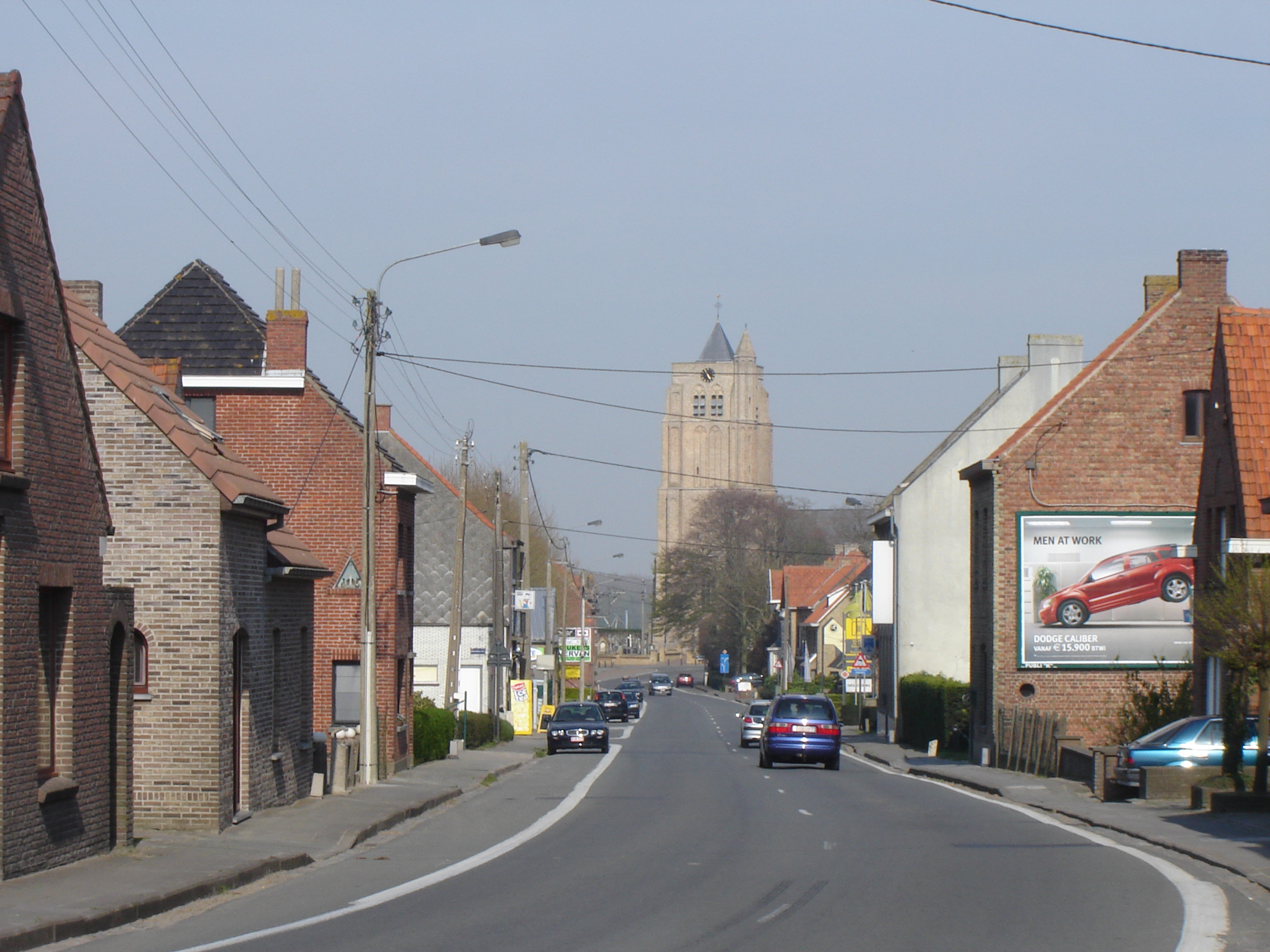
- Entering Esen through the Esenweg (N35)

- Coordinates: 51°01′46″N 02°54′08″E
- Country: Belgium
- Province: West Flanders
- Municipality: Diksmuide

Area
  - Total: 17.53 km^{2} (6.77 sq mi)

Population (2007)
  - Total: 1,854
  - Density: 106/km^{2} (270/sq mi)
- Source: NIS
- Postal code: 8600

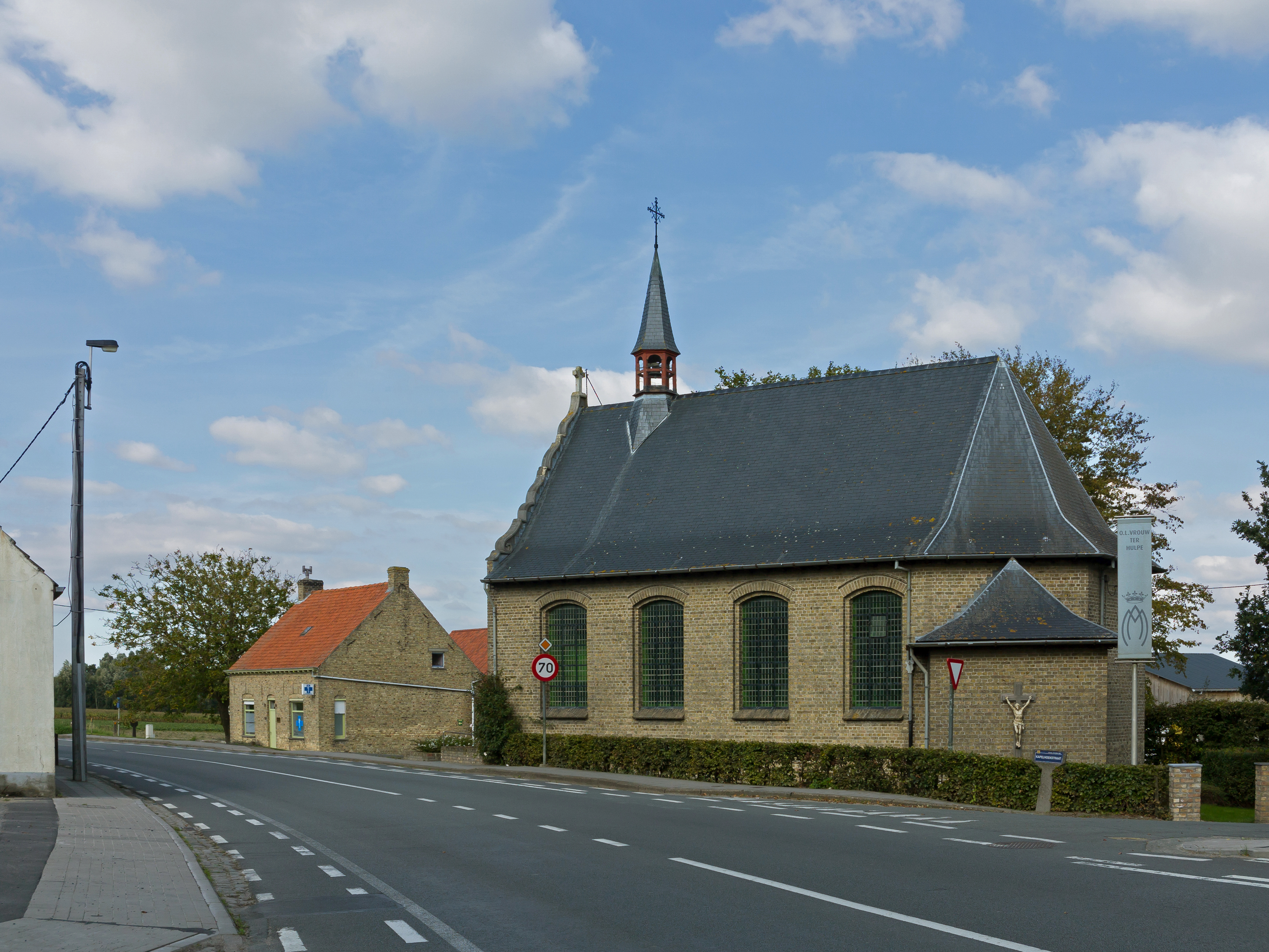
Esen, chapel: heropgebouwde kapel Onze-Lieve-Vrouw-ter-Hulpe

Esen is a village in the Belgian province of West Flanders, and a deelgemeente of the city of Diksmuide. It is the home of noted artisanal brewery De Dolle Brouwers.
