= De Dolle Brouwers =

Belgian brewery

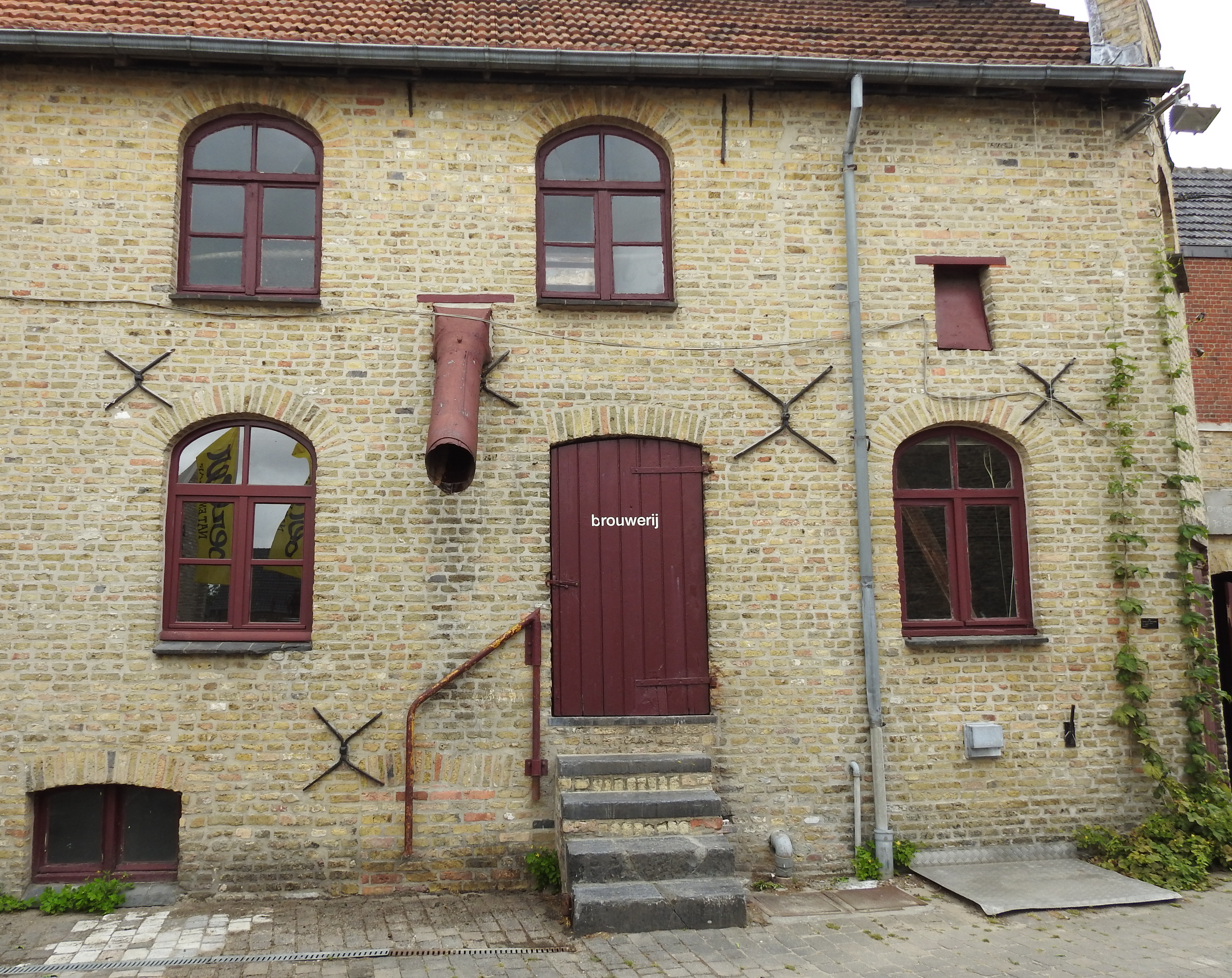
- The door to De Dolle Brewery in Esen, Belgium
- Location: Roeselarestraat 12B-8600 Esen, Belgium
- Opened: 1980
- Annual production volume: 1,000 hectolitres (850 US bbl)
- Owned by: Jo Herteleer, Kris Herteleer

De Dolle Brouwers ("The Mad Brewers") is a Belgian brewery, based in Esen in the province of West Flanders.

The building housing the brewery is believed to date from 1835 and has a long brewing history since its inception by local doctor Louis Nevejan, having become the Costenoble brewery in approximately 1882 and remaining in that family for three generations. It was defunct when purchased by De Dolle and restored to function as a brewery in 1980.

The grounds of the brewery and tasting room are open to visitors for tours once a week, and by appointment for larger groups.

== Beers ==
- 21 (9% ABV) Limited-edition beer with an Original Gravity of 21 degrees Plato brewed only in 1998 to celebrate the 21st anniversary of the Hotel Erasmus in Bruges.
- Arabier (8% ABV) Particularly hoppy beer, dry-hopped with whole leaf Nugget hops grown in Poperinge.
- Boskeun (7% ABV) Literally "rabbit of the woods", this strong blond Easter beer (Paasbier) hopped with Goldings.
- Dulle Teve (10%) Strong golden Tripel-style ale, the name meaning literally "Mad Bitch" in American English or "Angry Bitch" in British English.
- Lichtervelds Blond (9%) Tripel-style ale.
- Oeral (6% ABV)
- Oerbier (9% ABV) Meaning "original beer", this was the brewery's first product. The addition of lactobacillus gives the beer a somewhat tart taste when aged. Hopped with Goldings from Poperinge.
- Stille Nacht (12%) Strong Christmas beer.
- Special Extra Export Stout (9%) Strong dark beer.

All of the De Dolle products are bottle-conditioned, and additional seasonal or special brews are also produced.

== Awards and recognition ==
De Dolle received 4 Gold Awards in respected user ratings site RateBeer in their Best Beers of Belgium 2008 and 2 in 2009.

In 2000, De Dolle brewer and owner Kris Herteleer was awarded the biennial "Golden Hammer" award by Bruges-based brewing and cultural society 't Hamerken for his work in restoring the brewery to function and also research on local brewing history.

== Gallery ==
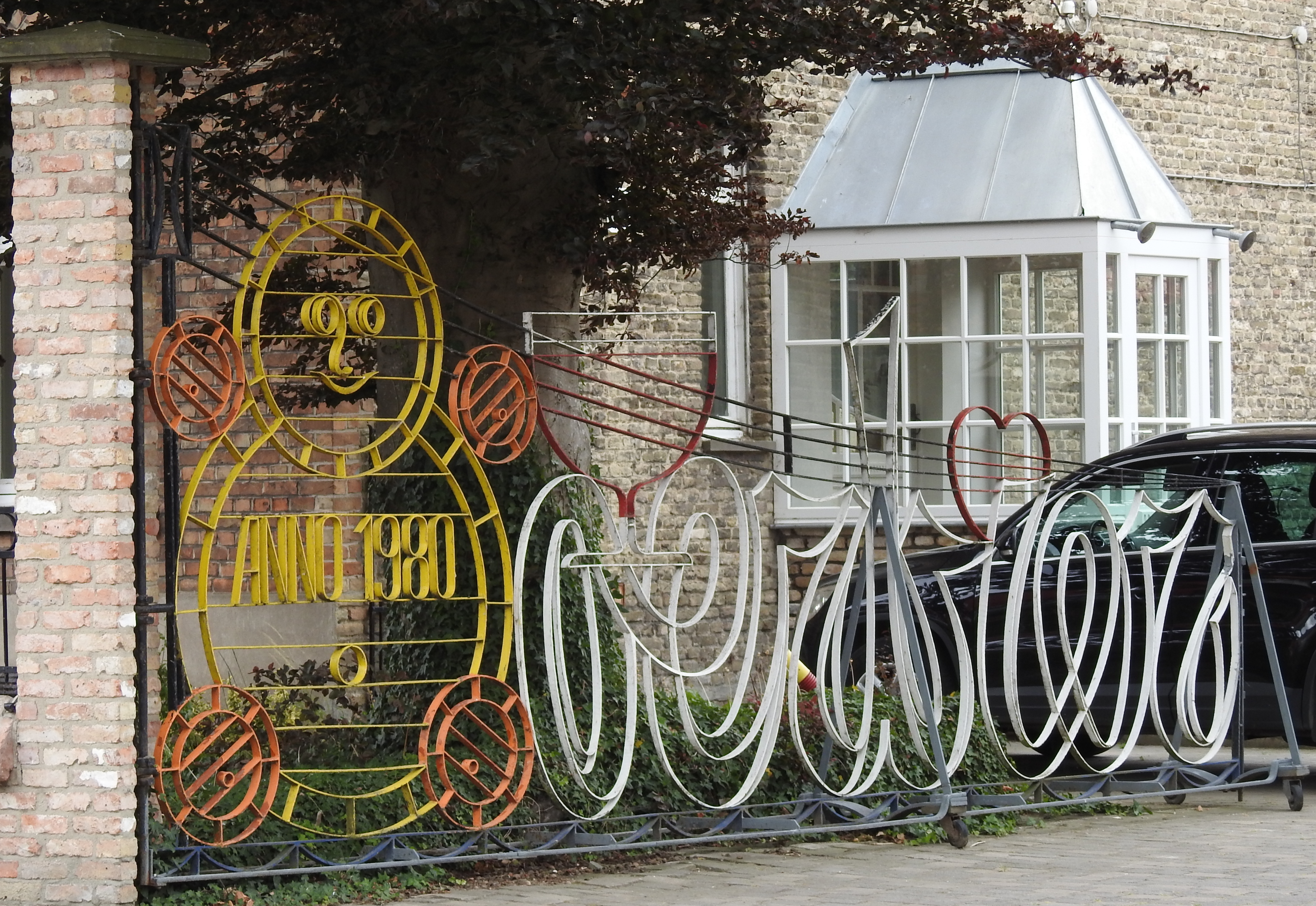
The driveway gate to De Dolle Brewery in Esen, Belgium

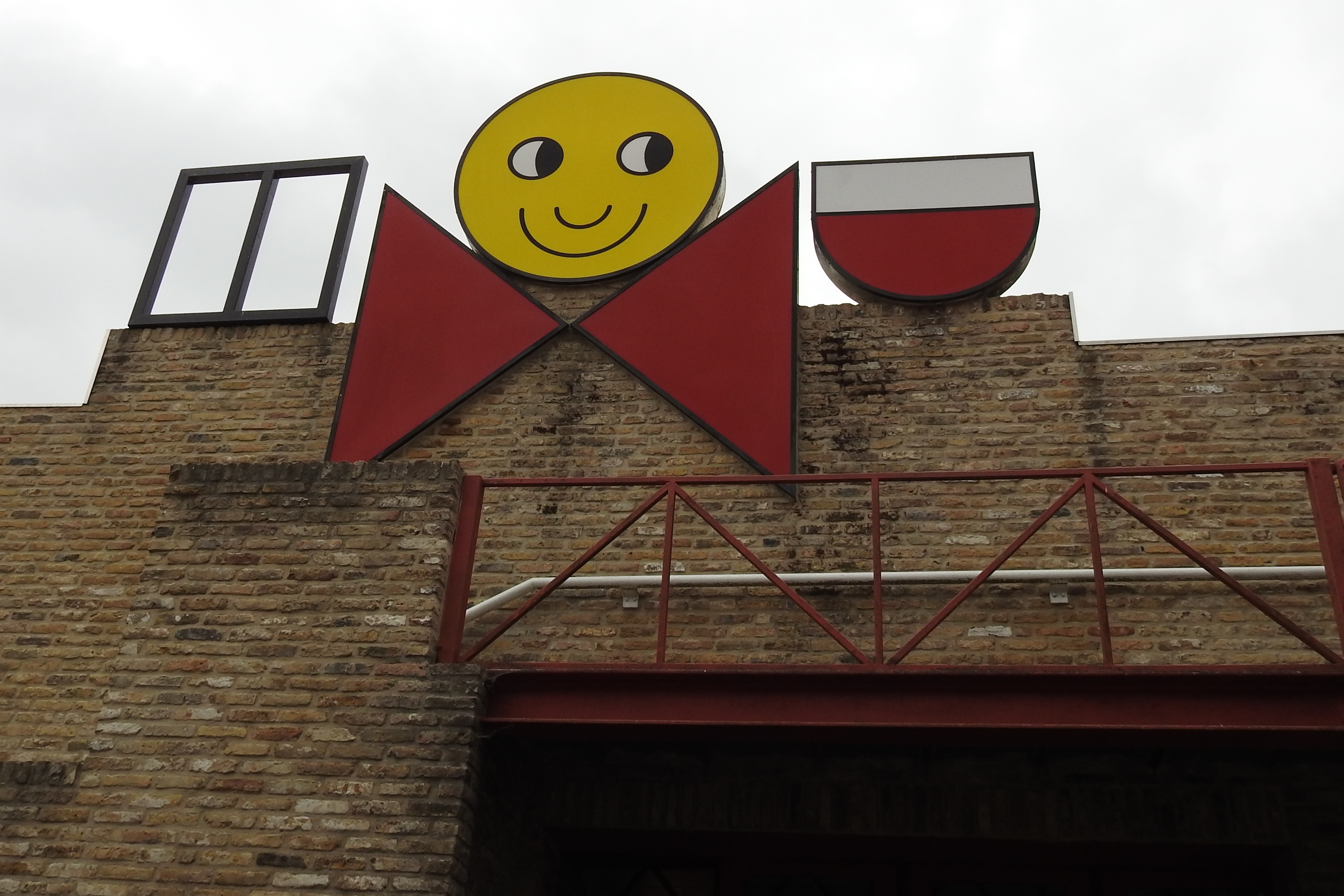
Sign on the front of the De Dolle Brewery warehouse in Esen, Belgium

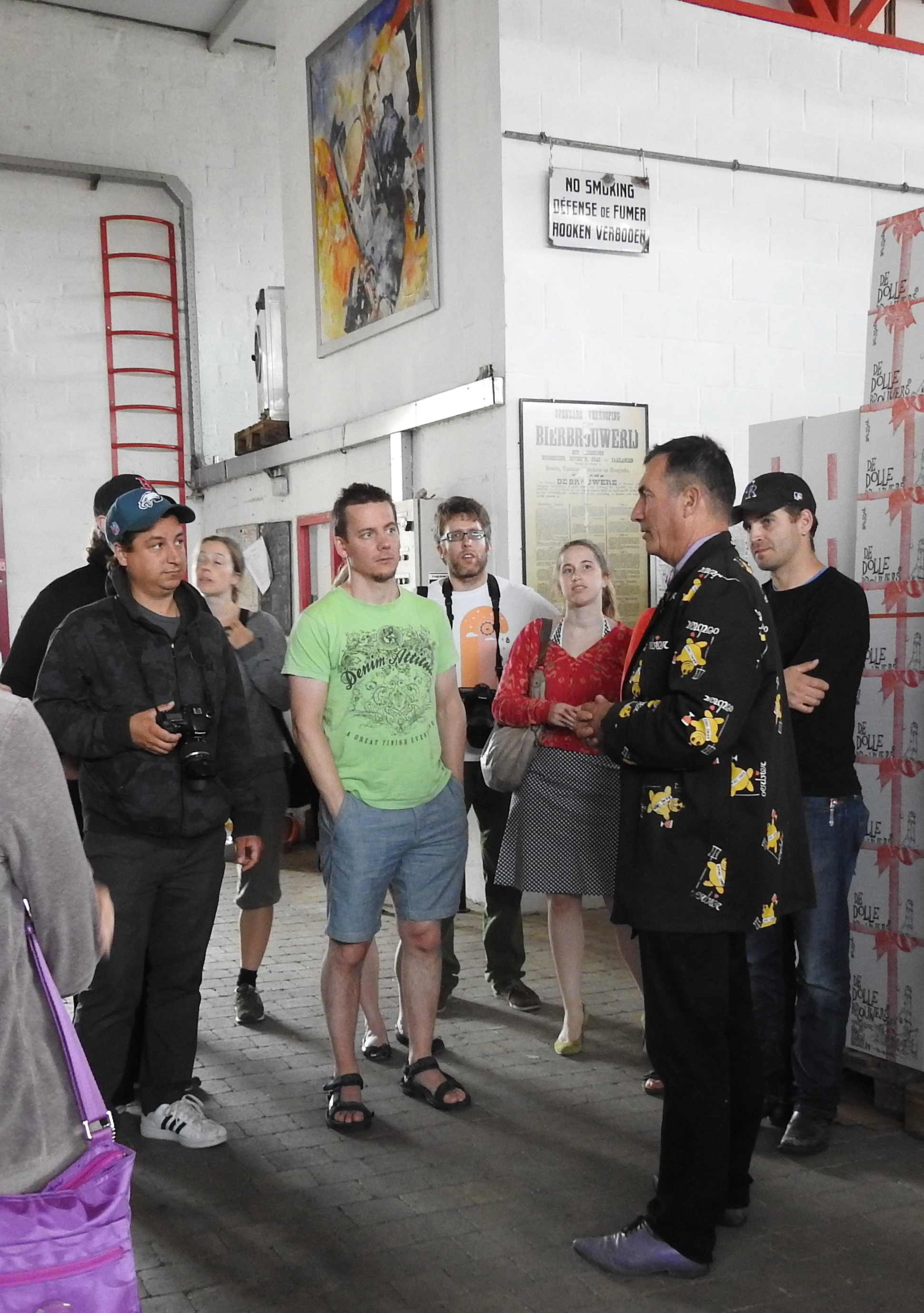
Kris Herteleer, owner of the De Dolle Brewery in Esen, Belgium, gives a brewery tour

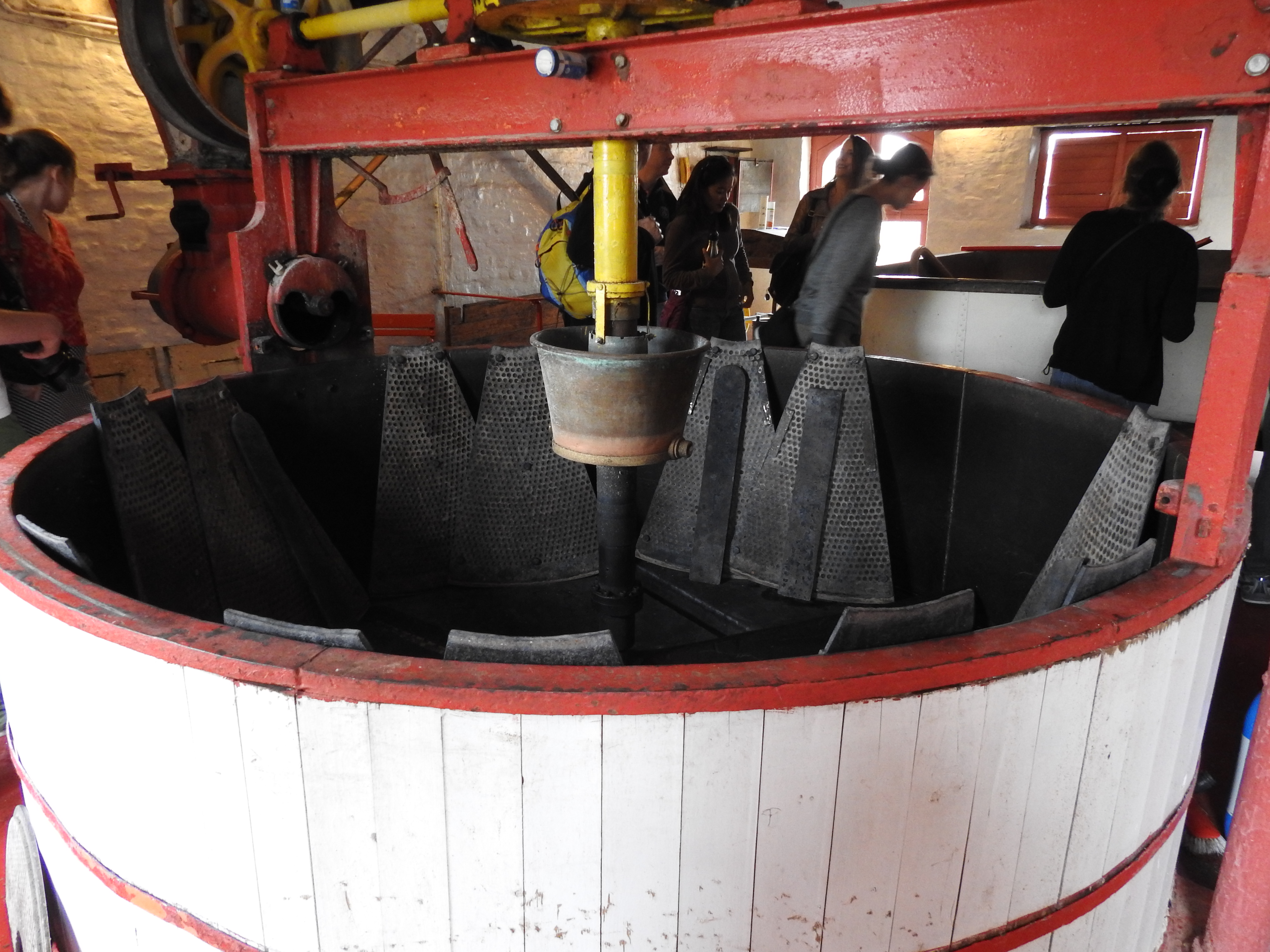
Classic mash tun at De Dolle Brewery in Esen, Belgium

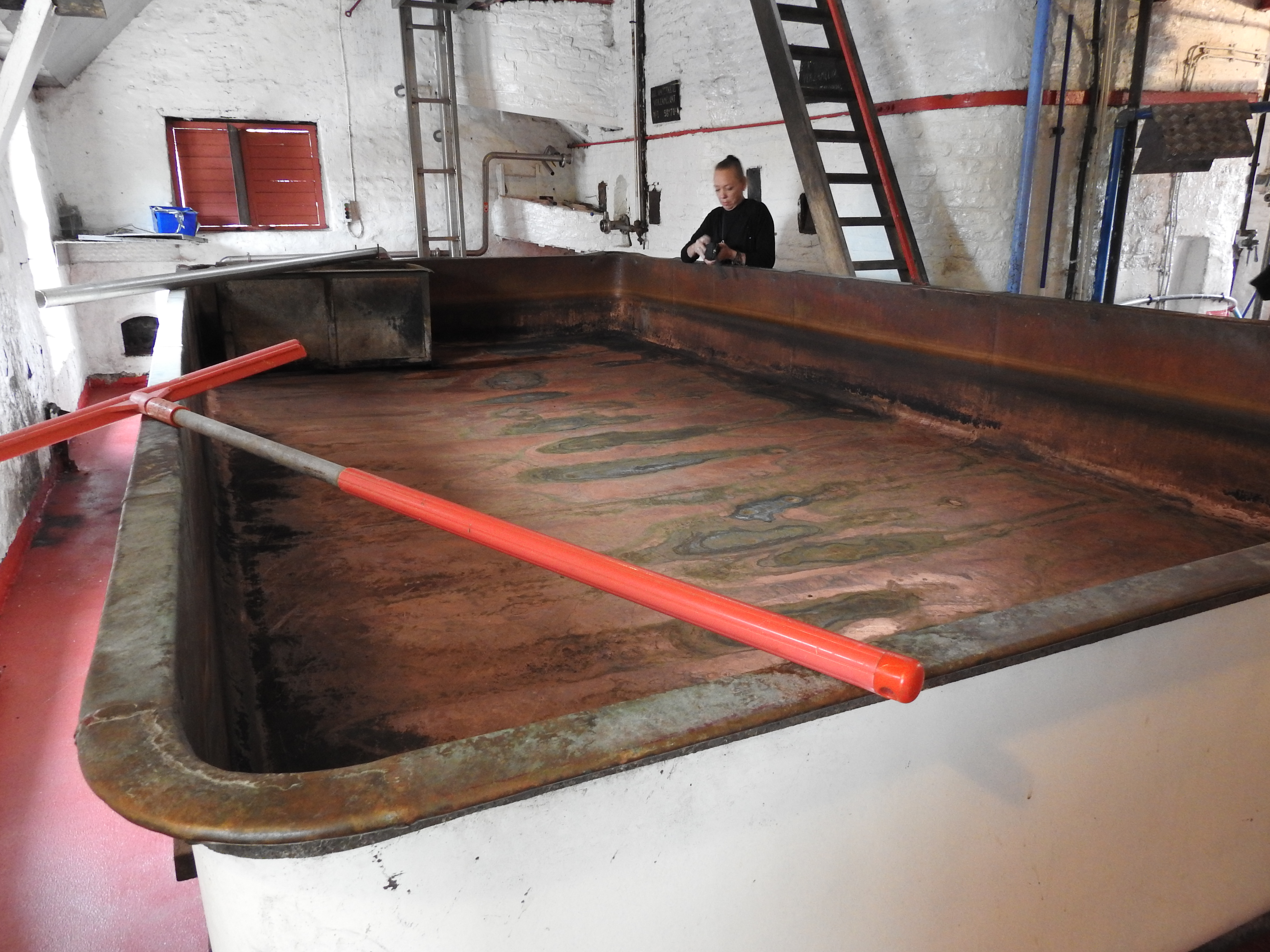
Classic lambic fermenter at De Dolle Brewery in Esen, Belgium

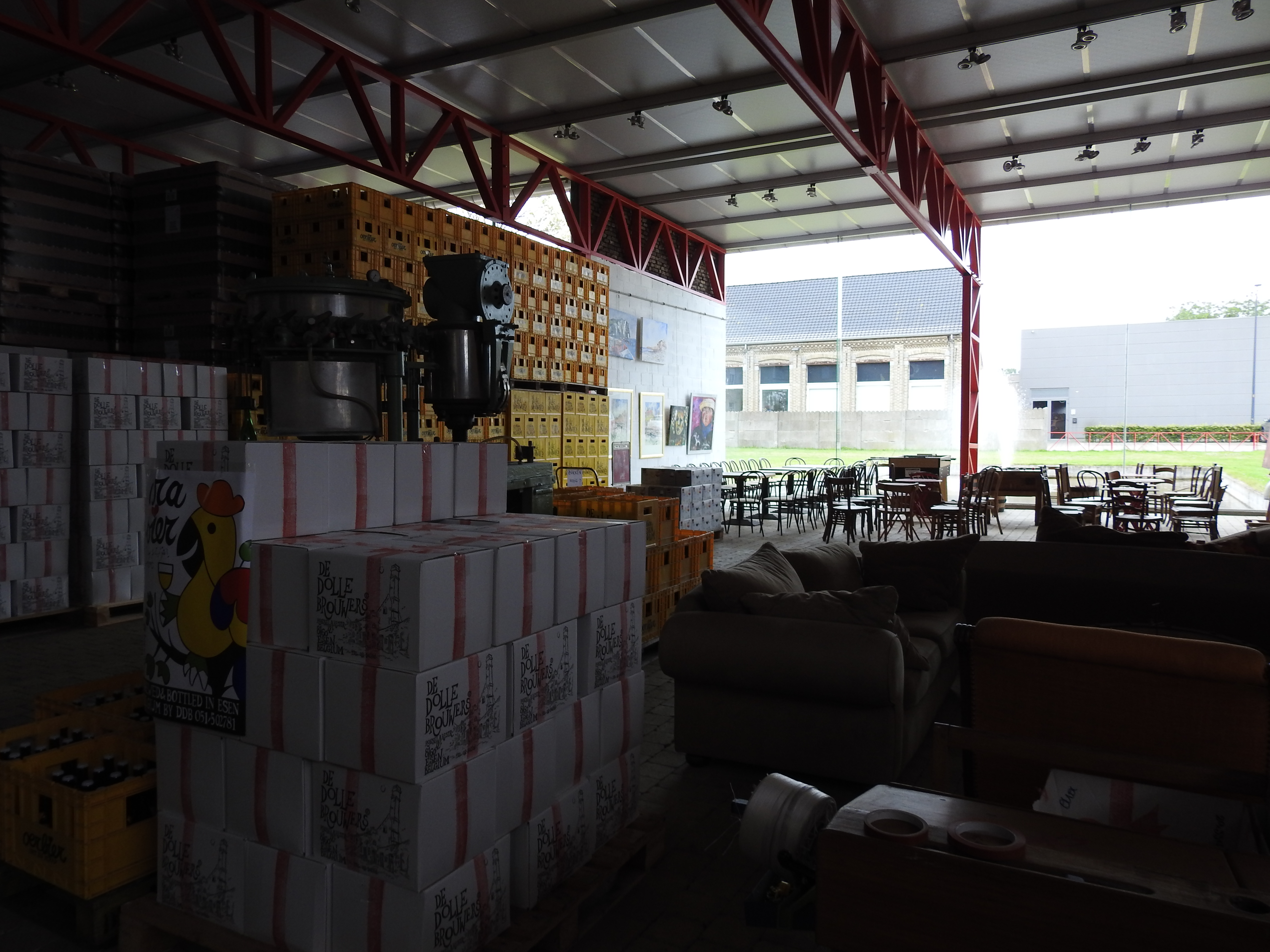
Warehouse and pub seating at De Dolle Brewery in Esen, Belgium

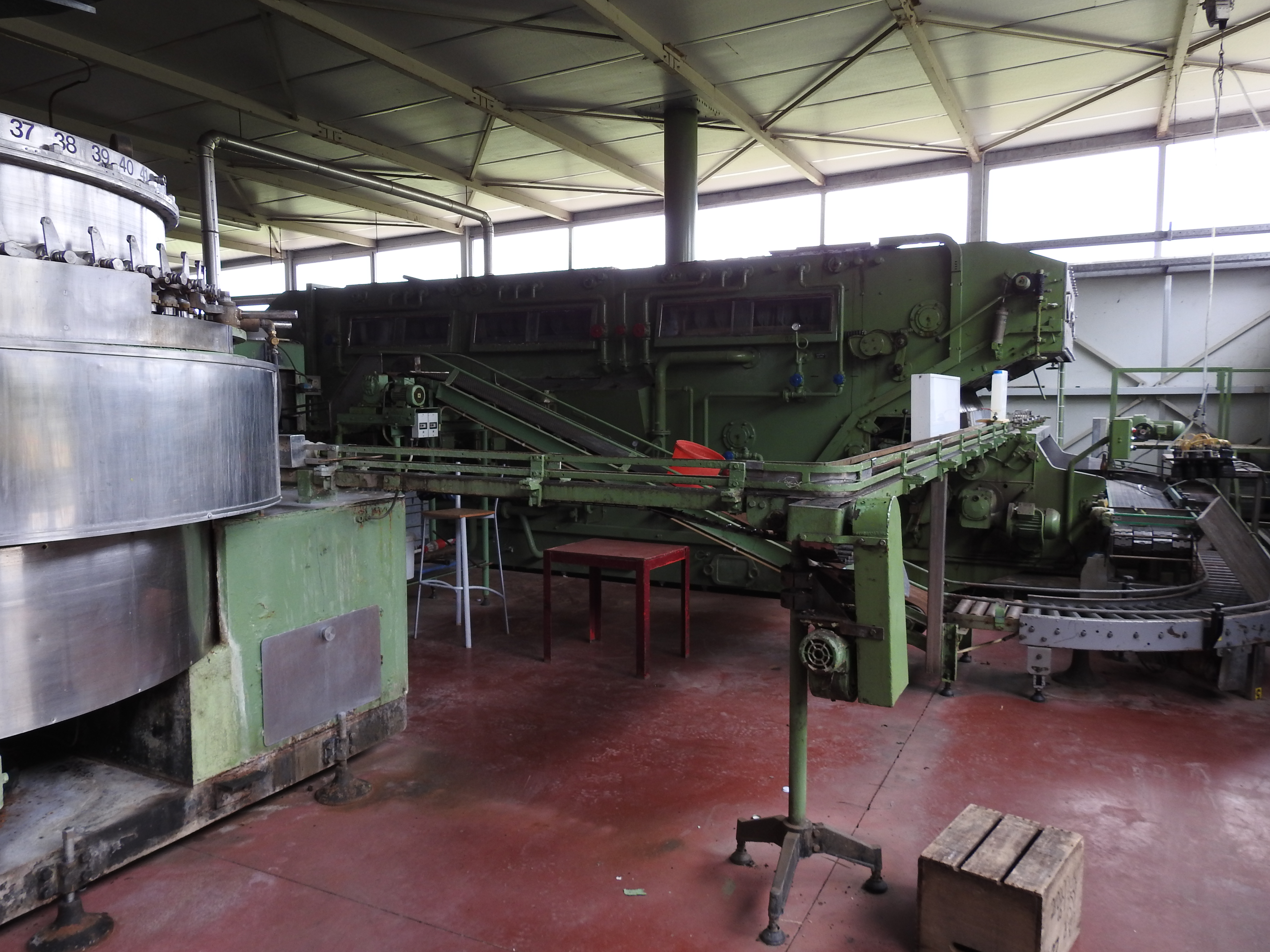
Bottling line at De Dolle Brewery in Esen, Belgium. This equipment is from the 1920s.
